= Law enforcement by country =

In many countries, particularly those with a federal system of government, there may be several law enforcement agencies, police or police-like organizations, each serving different levels of government and enforcing different subsets of the applicable law.

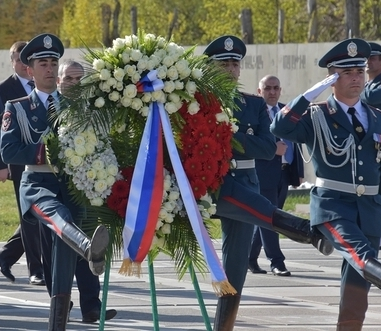
A wreath-laying team from the Police of Armenia.

== List by country ==
=== Afghanistan ===
The Afghan National Police is responsible for civilian law enforcement. Once under the control of the Western-backed government of Afghanistan, it was reorganized as a law enforcement arm of the Taliban after its takeover of the country in 2021.

=== Albania ===
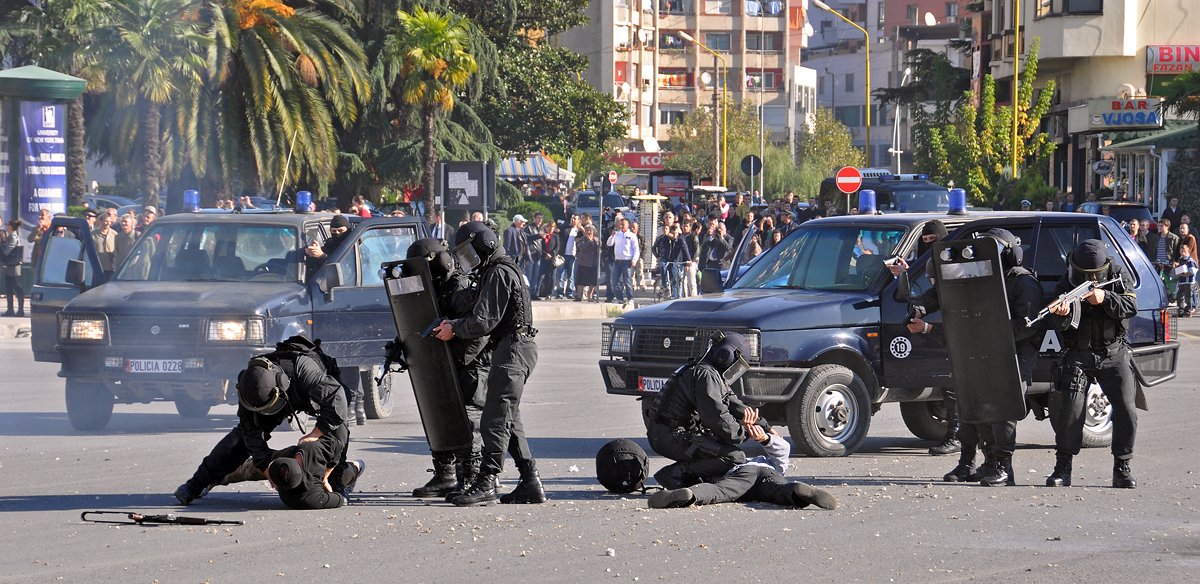
RENEA demonstrating a take-down during an exhibition in 2010. RENEA is a counter-terrorism unit operated by the Albanian State Police.

The Albanian State Police serve as the country's primary police force, and one of three policing services managed by Albanian Ministry of Internal Affairs. The Albanian State Police operates various subdivisions depending on purpose. Other ministries also manage a police force, including the Ministry of Defence, the Ministry of Justice, and the Ministry of Tourism and Environment.

=== Algeria ===
Algeria has two police forces, the Directorate General for National Security, which is responsible for policing urban areas, and the National Gendarmerie, a branch of the military, which is responsible for policing rural areas. Algeria also has municipal guards whose primary duty is to protect villages and act as an auxiliary force to the police.

=== Andorra ===
The Police Corps of Andorra (Catalan: Cos de Policia d’Andorra) is the national police force of Andorra. It reports to the Ministry of Justice and the Interior; however, in judicial matters, Police act under the orders of the Public Prosecutor's Office It closely collaborates with police forces from other countries, such as the French National Gendarmerie and the Spanish Civil Guard and National Police Corps.

=== Argentina ===
In Argentina the most important law enforcement organisation is the Argentine Federal Police (with a jurisdiction and organization similar to the FBI in the USA) with jurisdiction in all Argentine territories. Argentina is a Federal Republic divided into 23 provinces and one federal district, and as a result, provincial police forces (equivalent to state police in the US) carry out most routine police work, except in the capital city of Buenos Aires (the federal district), which is policed by the Buenos Aires City Police. A few other cities also have city police forces. The Argentine National Gendarmerie is responsible for border security, securing places of national strategic importance, assisting provincial police forces in maintaining public security in rural areas, and fighting crimes such as drug trafficking, smuggling, and terrorism. The Airport Security Police is responsible for policing duties in national public airports. The Argentine Naval Prefecture acts as a coast guard and polices navigable rivers.

=== Armenia ===
The Police of the Republic of Armenia is the national civilian law enforcement agency of the Republic of Armenia. It is divided into a police department for the capital city of Yerevan and one for each of the 10 marzer, or administrative divisions.

=== Australia ===
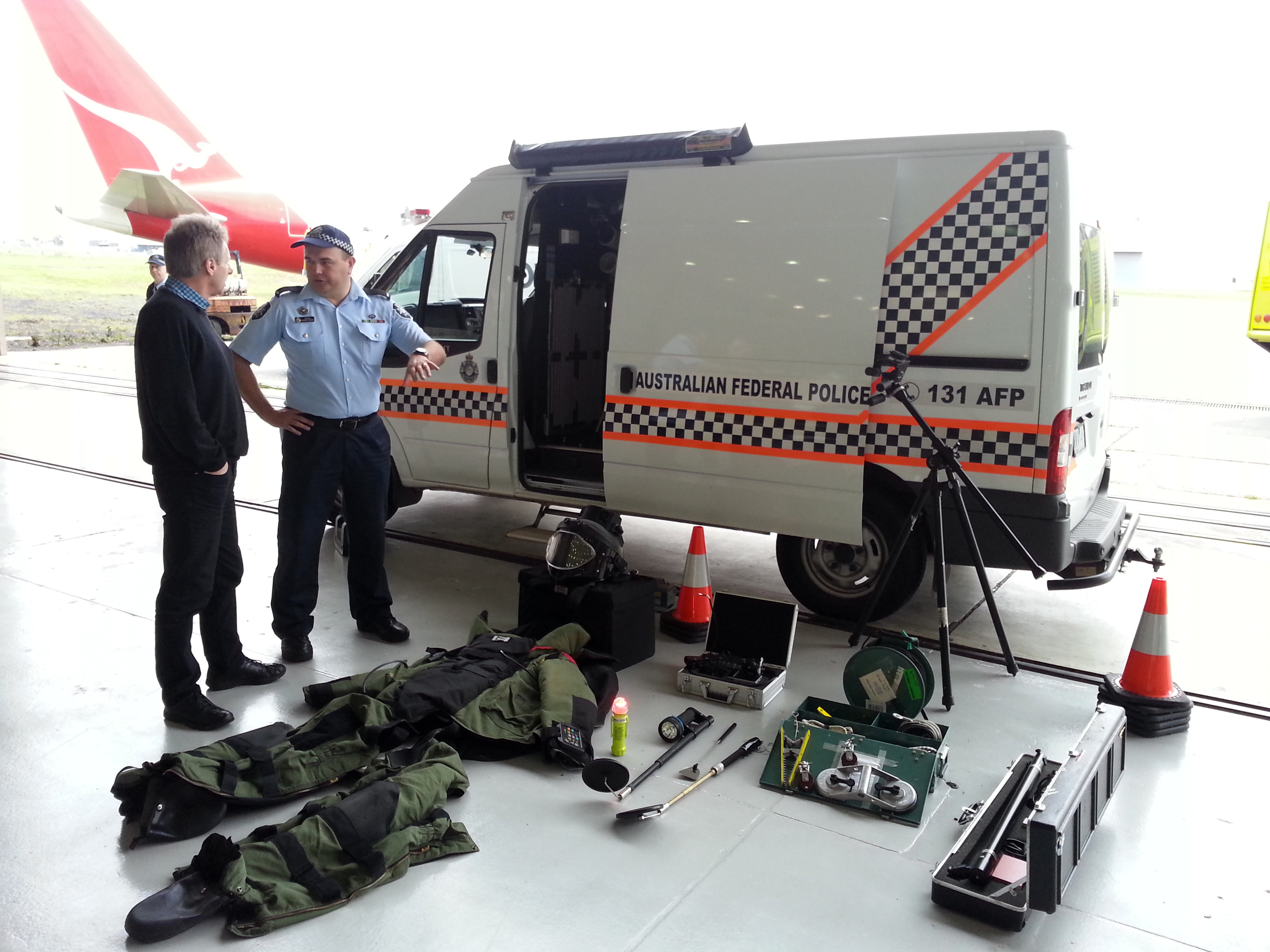
An officer showcasing bomb disposal equipment used by the Australian Federal Police.

The majority of policing work is carried out by the police forces of the six states that make up the Australian federation, such as the New South Wales Police Force, the Victoria Police, the Queensland Police Service, the Western Australian Police, the South Australian Police, the Tasmania Police and the Northern Territory Police. The Australian Federal Police are responsible for policing duties in the Australian Capital Territory and investigating crimes relating to federal criminal law (particularly crimes with an international dimension) nationwide.

=== Austria ===
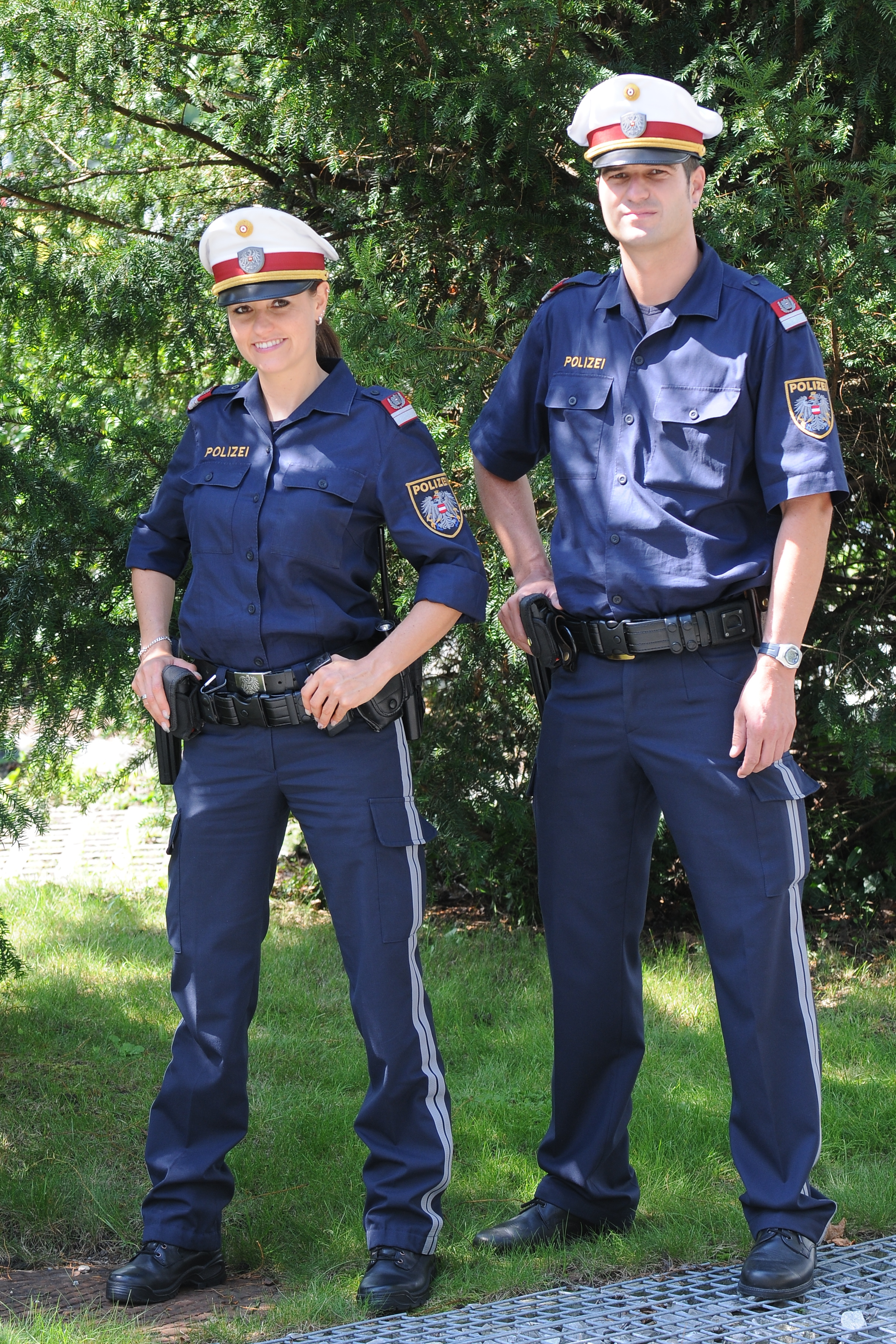
Two Austrian Federal Police officers.

The policing work is carried out basically by federal agencies. The Federal Police (Bundespolizei) is the uniformed force, the investigative work is done by the regional divisions of the Federal Criminal Police Office (Bundeskriminalamt), the Landeskriminalamt. Besides the federal agencies, some cities have a Municipal Police (Stadtpolizei) as well, having the same power as the federal police only restricted by the city boundaries.

=== Azerbaijan ===
The National Police of the Republic of Azerbaijan, which is administered by the Ministry of Internal Affairs, is the civilian police force of Azerbaijan. The Prosecutor's Office is responsible for criminal investigations. The Ministry of Taxes, Ministry of Justice, Ministry of Emergency Situations, and State Border Service maintain internal investigation offices which are responsible for dealing with crimes in specific areas.

=== Bahamas ===
The Royal Bahamas Police Force (RBPF) is the national law enforcement agency of the Commonwealth of the Bahamas. It operates under the authority of the Ministry of National Security. Like other small Caribbean countries, the police operate in close collaboration with the armed forces. In this case, internal security is almost exclusively the responsibility of the RBPF, as the Royal Bahamas Defence Force (RBDF) does not have a land component and is primarily dedicated to patrolling territorial waters.

The country also has other specialized law enforcement agencies, such as the Bahamas Customs Service and the Immigration Service.

=== Bahrain ===
Law enforcement in Bahrain is delegated to the Public Security Forces, which are divided into different units and departments including the police departments of the four Governorates of Bahrain, the Special Security Force Command, Traffic Police, and Coast Guard. The Public Security Forces are an arm of the Ministry of Interior.

=== Bangladesh ===
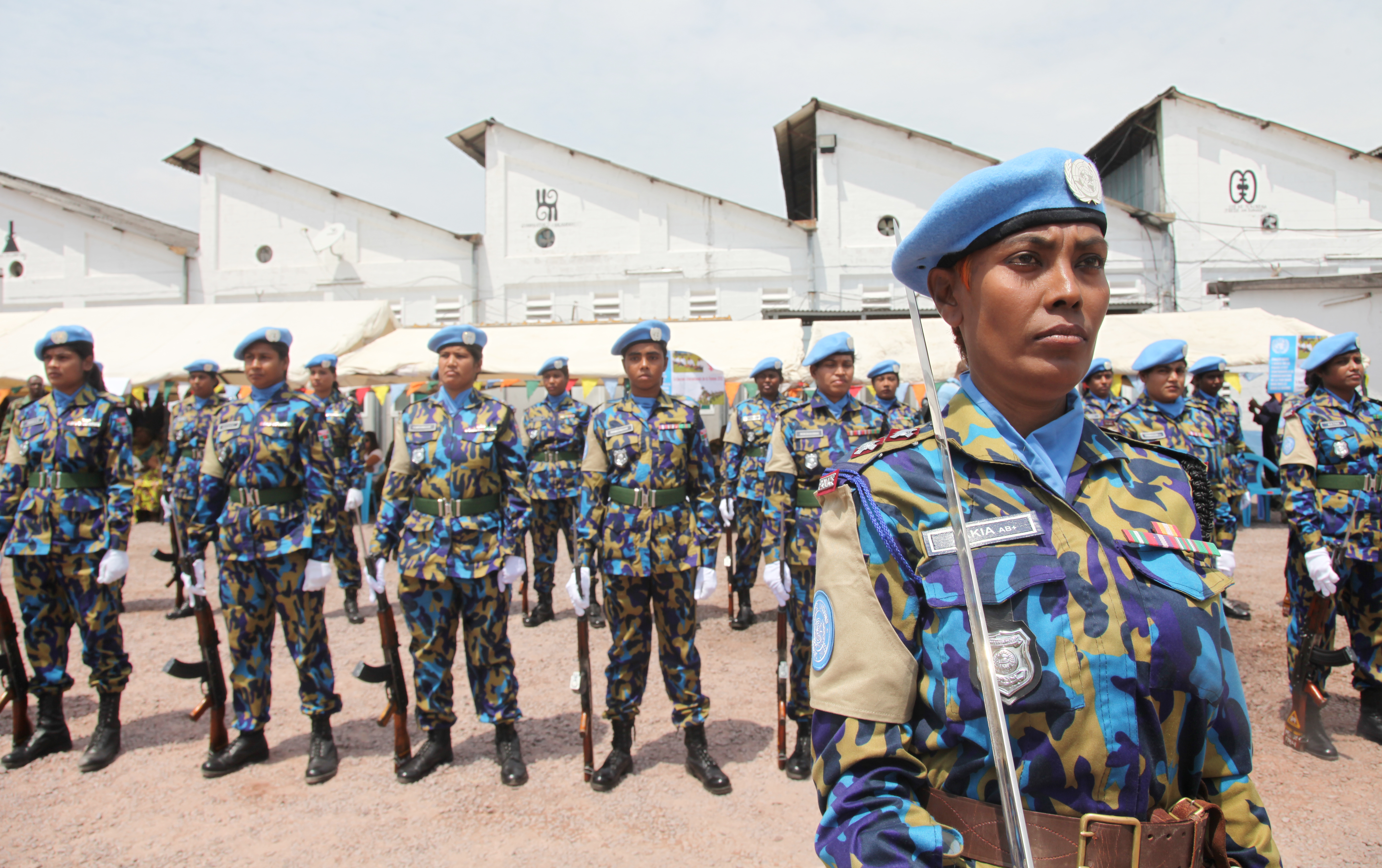
A police unit from the Bangladesh Police, serving as a part of the United Nations MONUSCO mission in the Democratic Republic of Congo.

The Bangladesh Police is the main law enforcement agency of Bangladesh. It is administered under the Ministry of Home Affairs of the Government of Bangladesh. It plays a crucial role in maintaining peace, and enforcement of law and order within Bangladesh. Though the police are primarily concerned with the maintenance of law and order and security of persons and property of individuals, they also play a big role in the criminal justice system.

=== Barbados ===
The Barbados Police Service (BPS) is the main agency tasked with maintaining local law and order in the country of Barbados. The police force may in times of need call upon the Barbados Defence Force (BDF) and/or Regional Security System for additional support.

=== Belarus ===
Belarus is the heir to a law enforcement system similar to that of the Soviet era. Its main police force is the Militsiya (lit, Militia), under the authority of the Ministry of the Interior, and includes the regional police divisions, such as the Minsk City Police Department. There is also a military-style body with functions similar to those of a gendarmerie, the Internal Troops. In addition to its role as an intelligence service, the State Security Committee (KGB RB, a direct heir to its Soviet counterpart) also serves as a political police force.

=== Belgium ===
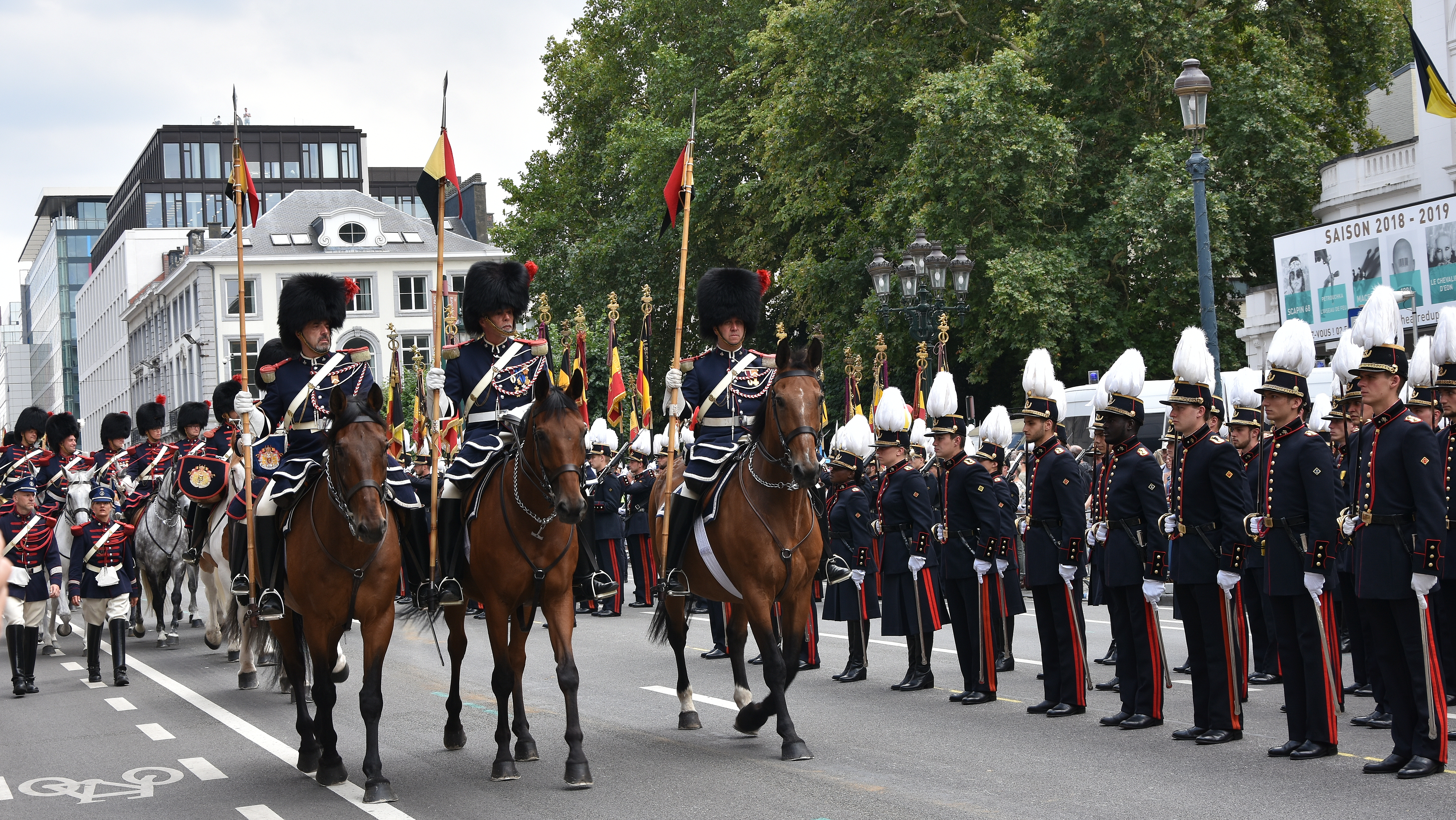
The Belgian Royal Escort, an escort unit provided by the Federal Police of Belgium.

The majority of policing work in Belgium is carried out by the local police forces. The Federal Police is responsible for policing and investigating serious and organized crimes nationwide. Both forces are autonomous and subordinate to different authorities but are linked through common recruiting, training, and logistical support.

=== Bhutan ===
The Royal Bhutan Police is responsible for ordinary policing, and in administering and maintaining the prisons.

=== Bolivia ===
As a unitarian republic, Bolivia has only one police force, the National Police Corps (Cuerpo de Policía Nacional), responsible for internal security, criminal investigation and maintaining law and order. This institution has authority over the entire country, with no other state or local forces, and reports to the national Ministry of Government.

=== Botswana ===
The Botswana Police Service is the sole civilian law enforcement agency of Botswana. It is divided into four regional divisions and seventeen district commands. It has a paramilitary branch, the Special Support Group (SSG), which is run on military lines. The Botswana Prison Service maintains the nation's prisons.

=== Bosnia and Herzegovina ===
The Bosnian Police is divided into multiple entities. The Federation of Bosnia and Herzegovina and the Republika Srpska each maintain separate policies on law enforcement. The Federation of Bosnia and Herzegovina has ten cantonal police forces, each under the canton's Ministry of Interior, and a federation-wide police force, the Federation of Bosnia and Herzegovina Police, which is a specialized force covering specific crimes and those that cross cantonal borders. The Republika Srpska has a single centralized police force. The Brčko District has its own police force. Bosnia and Herzegovina has two national law enforcement agencies, the State Investigation and Protection Agency (SIPA) and the State Border Service.

=== Brazil ===
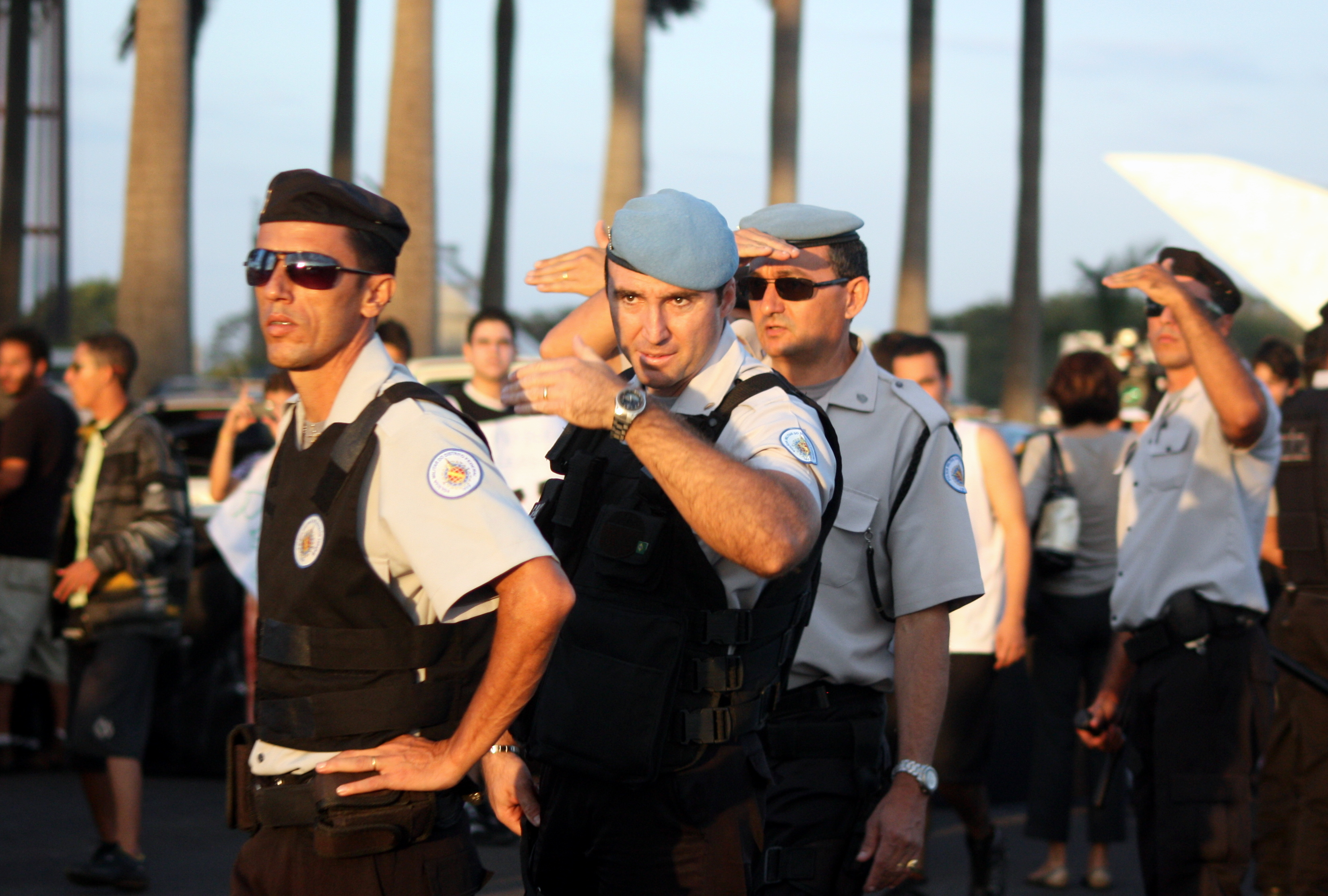
PMDF officers in 2011.

There are two active federal police services: the Brazilian Federal Police and the Brazilian Federal Highway Police. In addition, the Federal Railroad Police exists on paper but has been inactive for years. Each state has Military Police/Polícia Militar and Civil Police/Polícia Civil, both under the command of the state's governor. Despite their names, the Military Police are public order police, and the Civil Police investigative police. Lastly, more than 1200 cities have Municipal Guards. The armed forces have their own provost services.

=== Bulgaria ===
A number of law enforcement agencies operate in Bulgaria. The Ministry of Interior oversees the National Police Service is in charge of regular policing, the Central Office for Combating Organized Crime, which investigates organized crime and terrorism, the National Gendarmerie, and the Border Police Service. The National Investigative Service, which investigates serious crimes, is part of the judicial system.

=== Burundi ===
The National Police of Burundi is the lone civilian police service responsible for law enforcement across the country. It is divided into numerous branches including:

- Internal Security Police (Police de sécurité intérieure)
- Judicial Police (Police judiciaire)
- Air Police (Police de l'Air)
- Border and Aliens Police (Police des frontières et des étrangers)

( Prison Police (Police pénitentiaire)

=== Cambodia ===
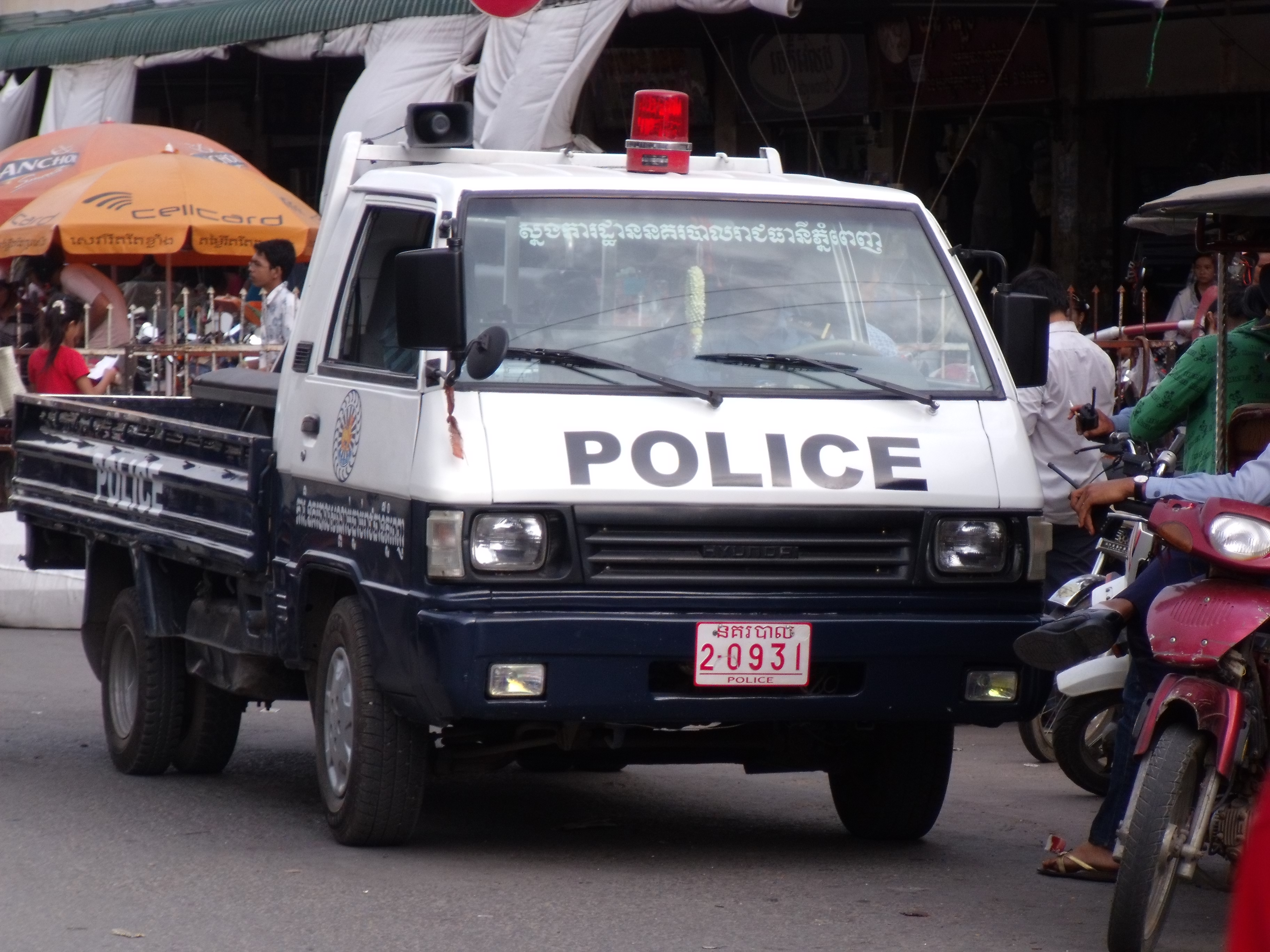
Cambodian police vehicle.

The National Police of Cambodia (Nokorbal Chéat) is Cambodia's police force which is under the Ministry of Interior. It is divided into four autonomous units and five central departments. The Royal Gendarmerie of Cambodia serves as Cambodia's military police force, and has internal security functions such as counter-terrorism, countering violent groups, and suppressing prison riots.

=== Canada ===
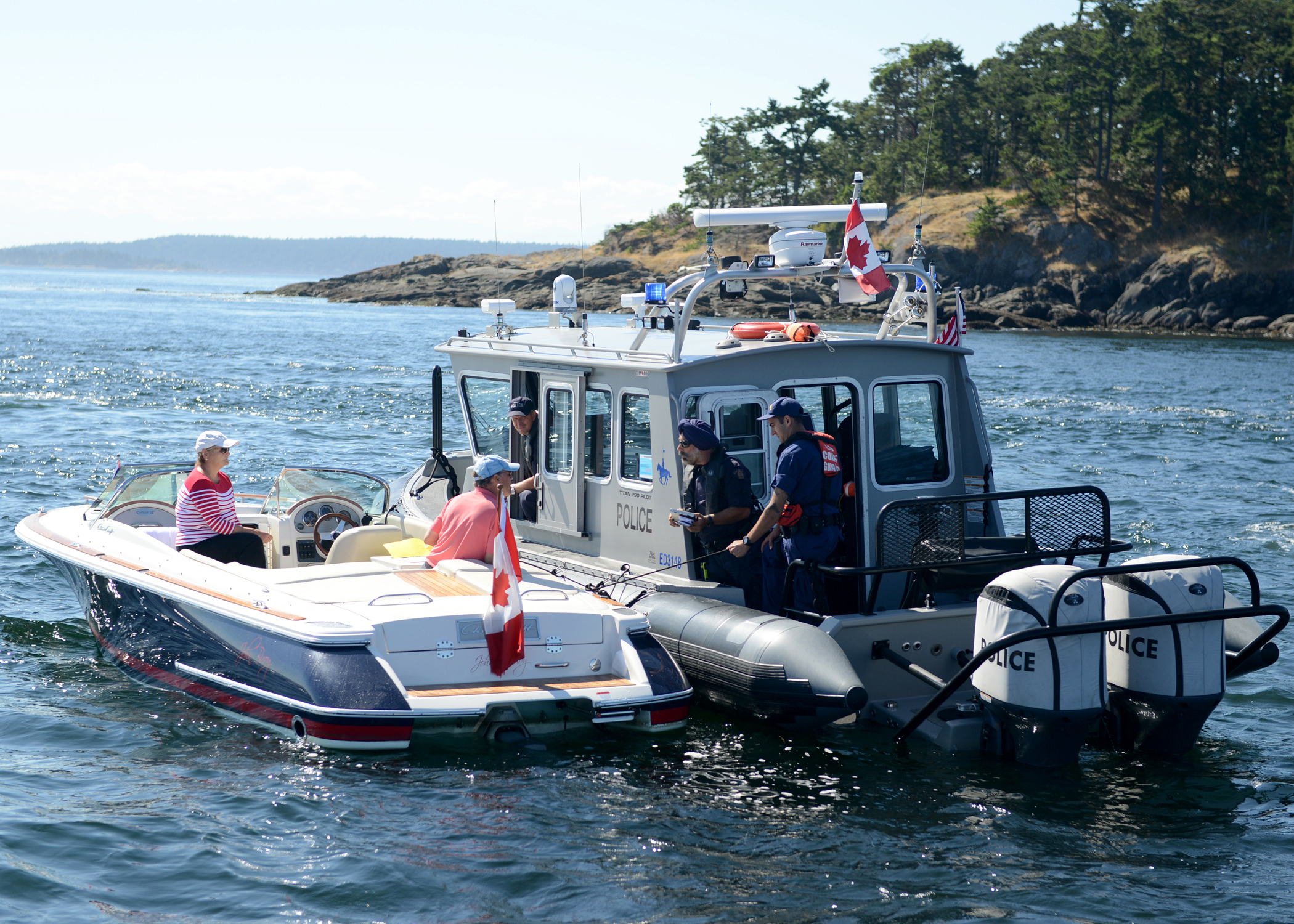
RCMP officers, working alongside U.S. Coast Guards, stop a pleasure craft to check for necessary documentation and life jackets off the coast of British Columbia in 2014.

In Canada, the development of criminal legislation falls under federal jurisdiction, but the enforcement of these laws is generally a provincial responsibility. In contrast to the United States or Mexico, there are only two specialized criminal law enforcement agencies in Canada, and the vast majority of criminal law enforcement is conducted by local police services, which maintain specialized criminal investigation units in addition to their community safety mandate. Other law enforcement is provided by special constabularies, which typically provide specialized police services to transit systems, universities, parks, and municipalities, and civil law enforcement agencies, which usually do not have a policing role.

Every province in Canada, with the exception of Newfoundland and Labrador, downloads the responsibility for local policing onto municipalities, which can operate their own police forces, share regional police services with surrounding communities, or enter into a contract with the provincial government for police services. Some First Nations can also establish independent police services, funded entirely by the provincial and federal governments, but these services have been historically underfunded compared to non-Indigenous police forces and the program that funds Indigenous police agencies was under review as of 2022. Since the 1990s, an increasing share of Canadian police forces and municipalities have adopted tiered police service delivery models, which reduce the responsibilities of police services by off-loading certain duties — such as forensic investigations, mental health crisis response, traffic enforcement, or low-risk calls for service — to non-police specialists or unarmed peace officers.

There is also a federal police force, the Royal Canadian Mounted Police (RCMP; French: Gendarmerie Royale du Canada; GRC), responsible for the enforcement of criminal legislation that concerns the entire federation, such as anti-terrorism operations; border patrols between official crossings; several police-related programs, such as the Canadian Police College and Canadian Firearms Program; domestic counter-espionage with the assistance of the Canadian Security Intelligence Service; and, uniquely and controversially, the delivery of provincial and municipal police services under contract. The RCMP provides contracted police services to eight provinces, all three Canadian territories, around 600 Indigenous communities, and about 150 municipalities directly.

=== Chile ===
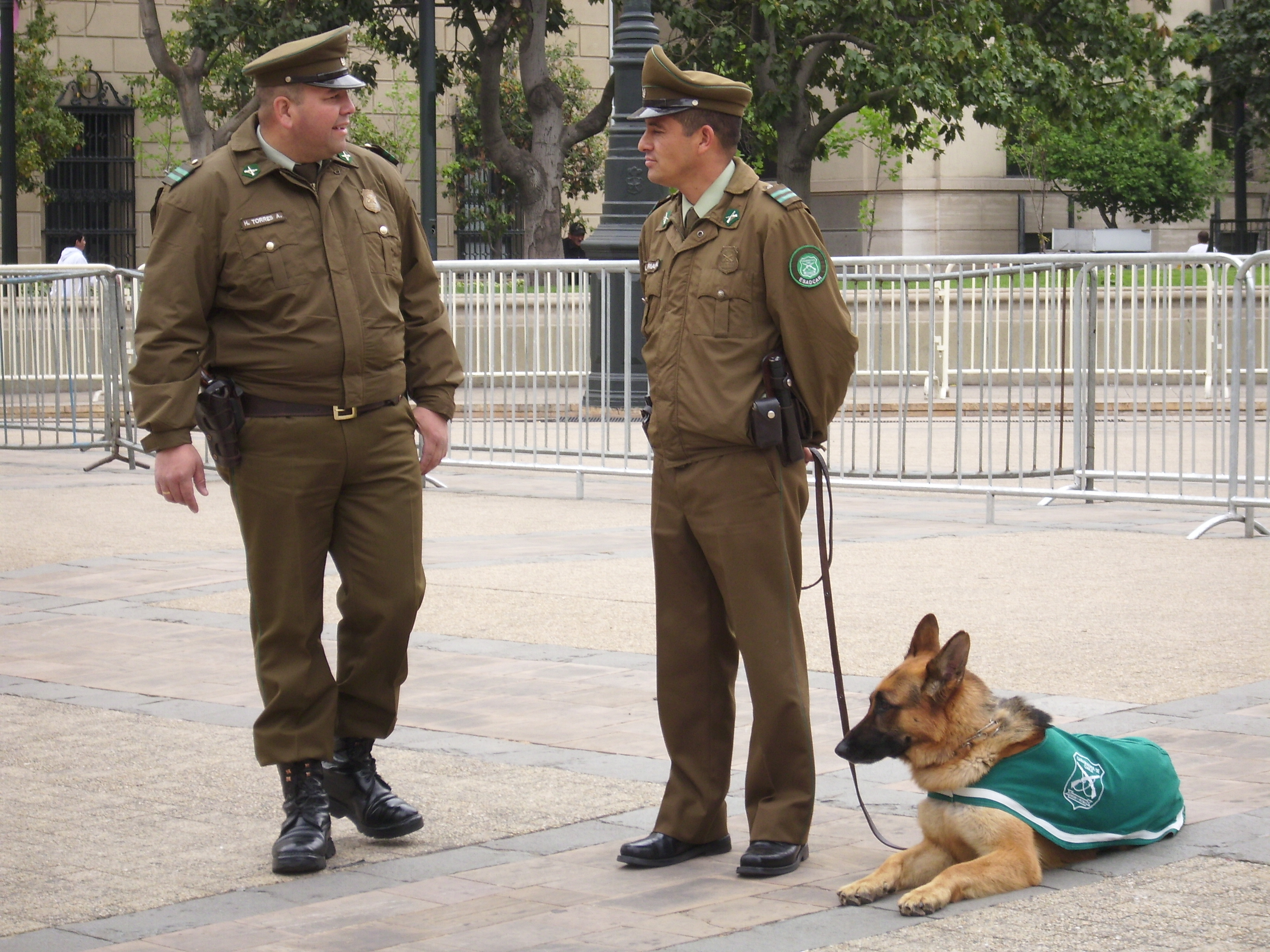
Two Carabiniers of Chile officers with a German Shepherd dog in Plaza de la Constitución in Santiago.

Chile has two national police forces. The Carabiniers of Chile (Carabineros de Chile) serve as the uniformed security police force with jurisdiction over all Chilean territory; despite being a gendarmerie, this name is reserved for the national prison security force, the Chilean Gendarmerie (Gendarmería de Chile). Criminal investigation duties are performed by the Investigations Police (Policía de Investigaciones de Chile). Both forces operate under the authority of the Ministry of Public Security, while the gendarmerie reports to the Ministry of Justice.

=== China, People's Republic of China ===
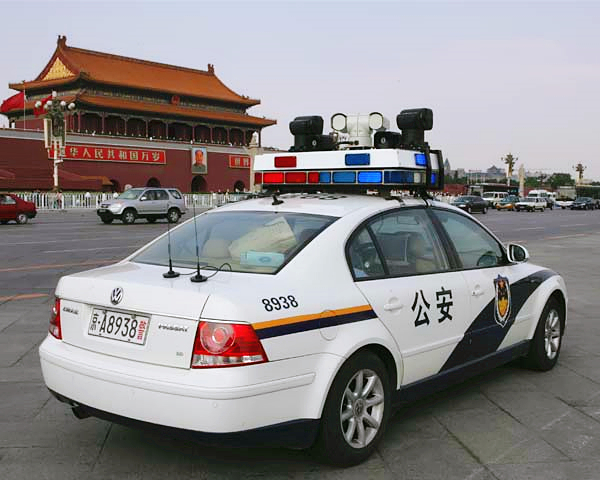
A police car in Tiananmen Square.

In the People's Republic of China (PRC), civilian police is mainly done by the People's Police, a branch within the Ministry of Public Security organs, typically through local public security bureaus (PSBs) all under the Ministry of Public Security (MPS), with the assistance of the paramilitary force, the People's Armed Police (PAP). The PAP, including the China Coast Guard (CCG), is under the sole administration of the Central Military Commission (CMC) from 2018. The People's Police has two other executive branches under the Ministry of State Security (MSS) and the Ministry of Justice (MOJ), as well as two Judicial Police branches under the Supreme People's Court (SPC) and the Supreme People's Procuratorate (SPP),

==== Hong Kong ====
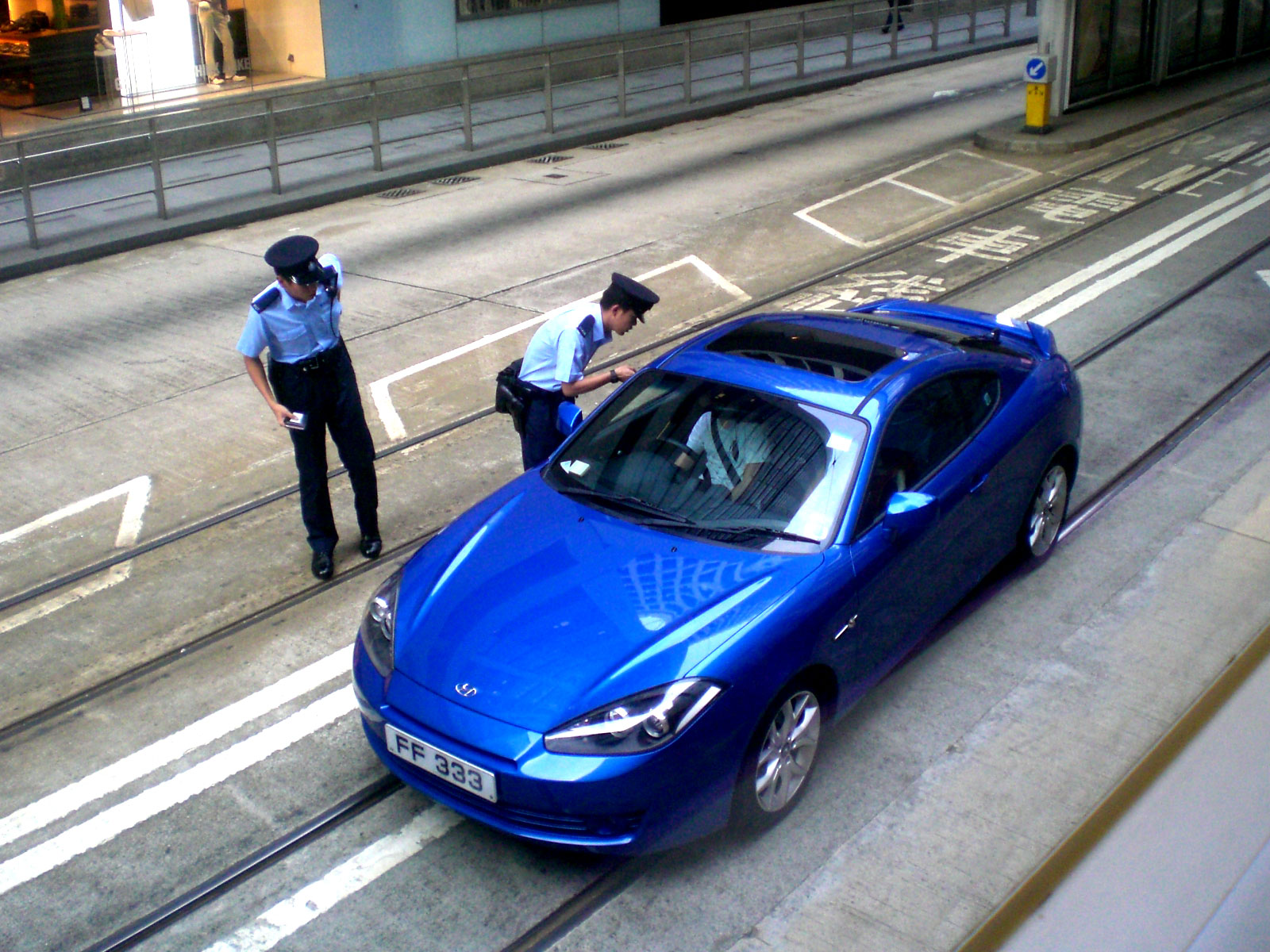
Officers of the Hong Kong Police Force stop a vehicle in a lane intended for buses and trams.

As a special administrative region of China, Hong Kong maintains a high degree of autonomy from the Central Government of the PRC, such as maintaining its own law enforcement service. The Hong Kong Police Force (Chinese: 香港警務處) operate under local legislations and the Hong Kong Basic Law and within the traditional constabulary concept of preserving life and property, preventing and detecting crime and keeping the peace. For times of emergency the force has a paramilitary capability. The Commissioner of Police reports to the Secretary for Security, who is responsible for all disciplined services in Hong Kong.

==== Macau ====
As a special administrative region of China, Macau maintains a high degree of autonomy from the Central Government of the PRC, such as maintaining its own law enforcement service. There are two branches of police forces in Macau:

1. Corpo de Polícia de Segurança Pública (CPSP – Public Security Police Force) – a civil uniformed police force, responsible for rule and order in the entire territory.
2. Polícia Judiciária (PJ – Judiciary Police) – responsible for major criminal investigations.

In addition, Serviços de Polícia Unitários (SPU – Unitary Police Service) leads, commands and coordinates the anti-crime operations carried out by CPSP and PJ.

=== Colombia ===
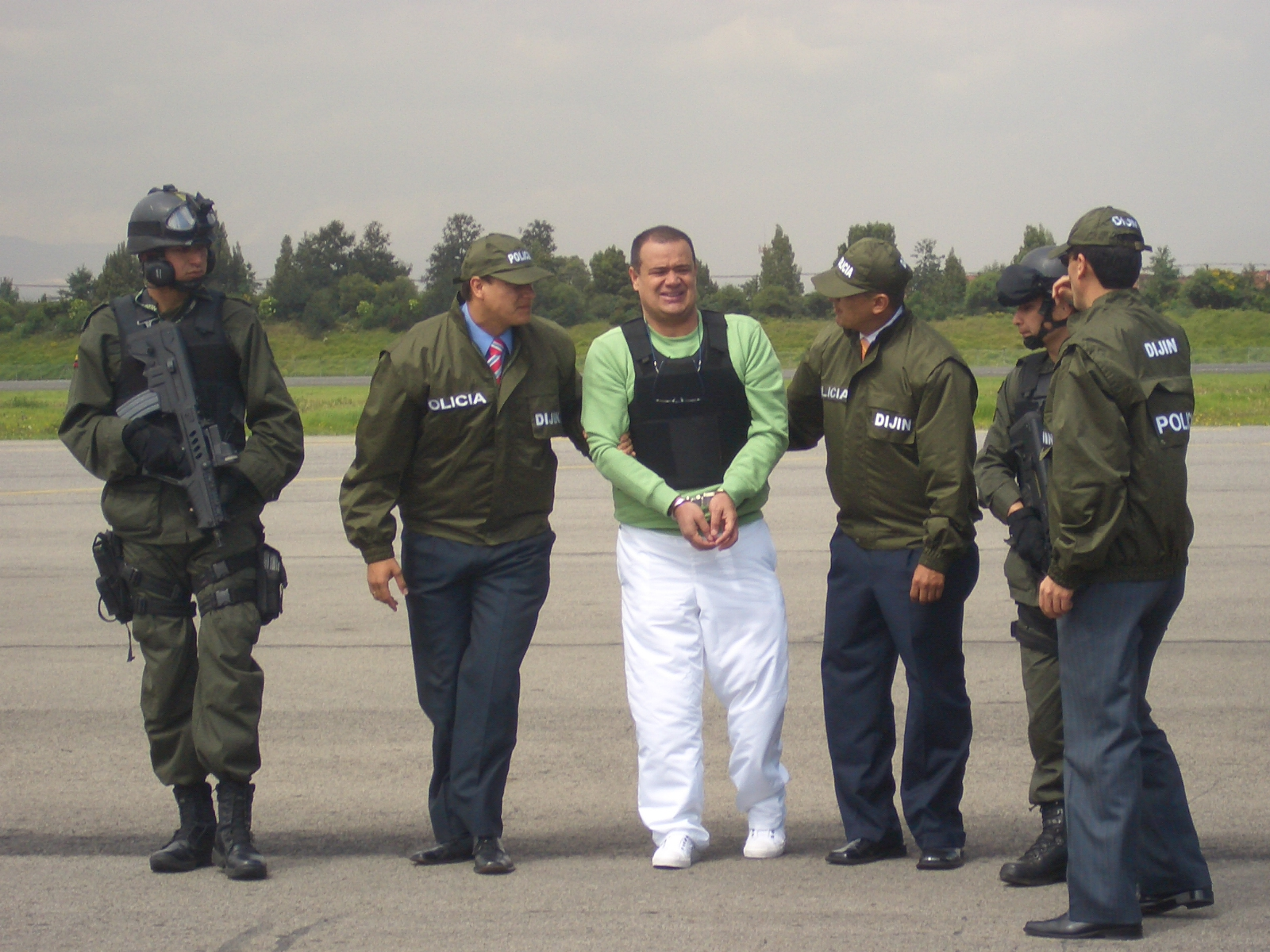
Members of the National Police of Colombia escort Luis Gómez to be extradited to the United States.

The National Police of Colombia (Spanish: Policía Nacional de Colombia) is the national police force of Colombia. Although the National Police is not part of the Military Forces of Colombia (Army, Navy, and Air Force), it constitutes along with them the "Public Force"[2] and is also controlled by the Ministry of Defense. Unlike many nations that use a tiered system of law enforcement, the National Police is the only civilian police force in Colombia. The force's official functions are to protect the Colombian nation, enforce the law by constitutional mandate, maintain and guarantee the necessary conditions for public freedoms and rights and ensure peaceful cohabitation among the population. For these purposes, the police have rural police divisions (the "carabineros"), traffic police, investigations, anti-drugs, intelligence, citizen security, internal control, among others. The police force divides its functions into local and departmental deconcentrated units, such as the police departments (which act as departmental police forces and in some geographical areas under the command of the governors) and the metropolitan police forces that operate in the main cities; there are also police stations in each municipality and the police officers who operate within these are under the command of the respective mayor's office. Annual budget US$3.6 to 4 billion There are 147,000 employees.

Although in Colombia the main force for compliance with civil law is the National Police and its divisions, there are other smaller units such as the Colombia Migration Unit in charge of the Foreign Ministry, the Technical Investigation Corps in charge of the Attorney General's Office, and some local transit agents who fulfill some law enforcement functions in their respective areas.

=== Costa Rica ===
The Public Force of Costa Rica is responsible for law enforcement duties, acting as both a civilian police force and gendarmerie. In addition to ordinary policing, it is responsible for border patrol, counter-insurgency, riot control, tourism security, and coast guard duties.

=== Croatia ===
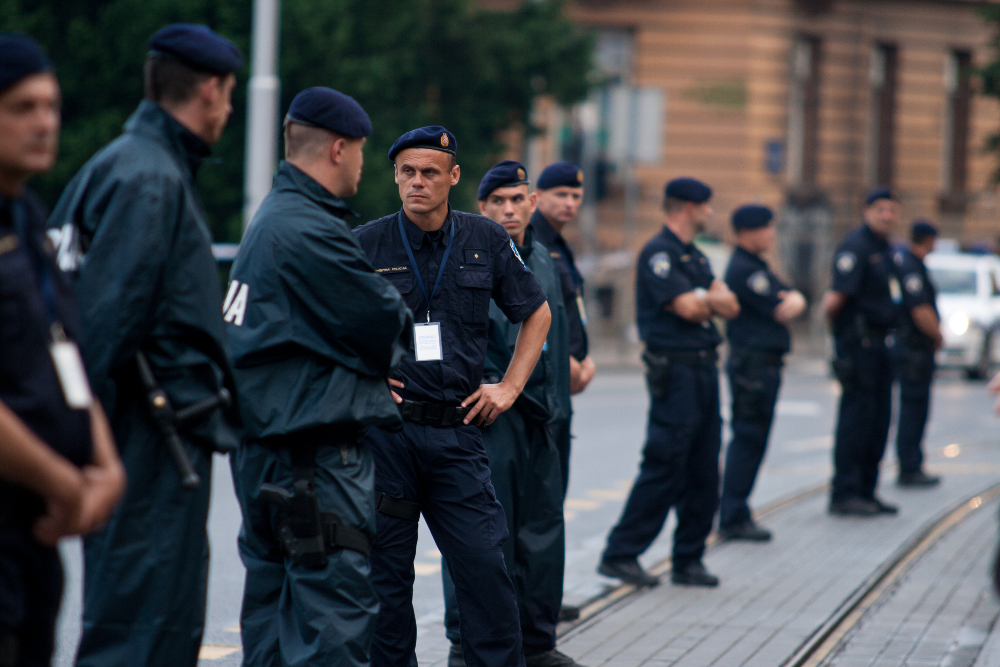
Croatian Intervention Police officers in 2011.

Law enforcement in Croatia is the responsibility of the Croatian Police (Croatian: Hrvatska policija), which is the sole police force of the country, subordinated by the Ministry of the Interior. Through the authority of the General Police Directorate, it carrying out tasks from regular policing and control of road traffic, to border protection and major national investigations.

=== Cuba ===
Law enforcement in Cuba is the responsibility of the National Revolutionary Police Force (Spanish: Policía Nacional Revolucionaria, PNR) under the administration of the Cuban Ministry of the Interior, which in turn reports to the Council of State. The PNR is responsible for uniform policing, criminal investigation, crime prevention, juvenile delinquency, and traffic control across the 14 provinces of Cuba.

In addition, the PNR is supported by the Committees for the Defense of the Revolution (CDR), a network of neighborhood committees across the country, which provide, among other community services, a nightly neighborhood watch.

=== Cyprus ===
The Cyprus Police is responsible for civilian law enforcement. Its specialized units include the Cyprus Police Aviation Unit, the Cyprus Port and Marine Police, the Emergency Response Unit, and Presidential Guard. The Cyprus Prisons Department guards inmates.

=== Czech Republic ===
The main law enforcement agency in the Czech Republic is the Policie ČR, charged with making arrests, investigating crimes, ensuring road and highway security, and other standard policing tasks. Directed by the Policejní prezident, who holds a rank of colonel or general, policie officers hold ranks similar to those of the military. At the municipal level, city police (Městská policie) are funded and directed locally. Sizes of local forces vary and officers have only limited law-enforcement powers, such as traffic enforcement; they can make arrests and must call on the national police to handle serious problems.

=== Denmark ===
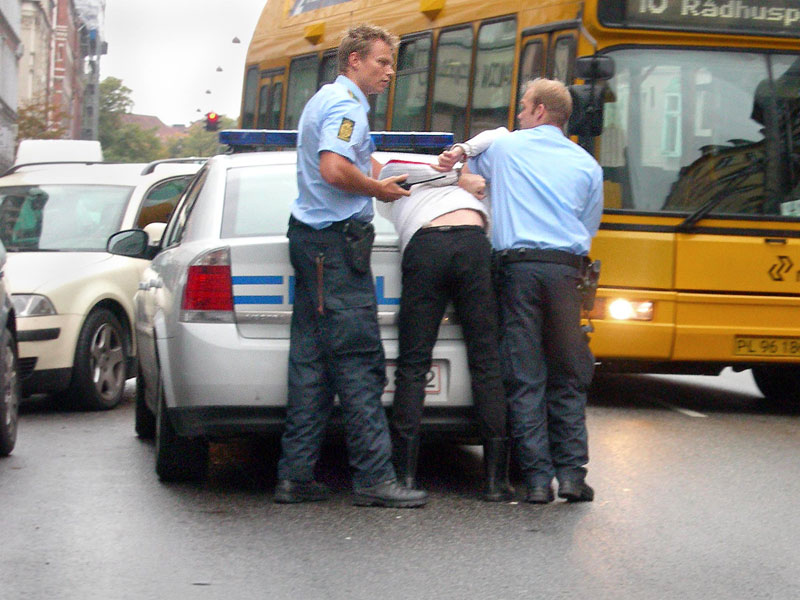
Danish police officers arresting an individual on the trunk of a police car.

The main law enforcement agency is the Police of Denmark (da: Politiet), under the Danish Ministry of Justice, including 12 common police districts, the state nationwide police force Rigspolitiet, the national intelligence service Politiets Efterretningstjeneste and the special tactical forces Politiets Aktionsstyrke. Further more a Danish military police branch (da: Militærpolitiet) and Danish home guard unit Politihjemmeværnet exists.

=== Dominican Republic ===
The country has a single police force, the Dominican National Police (Policía Nacional Dominicana), which is divided into specialized units, such as homicide investigation, anti-narcotics, tourist police, and financial crimes. Although it is not a gendarmerie but a civilian force (under the authority of the Ministry of the Interior and Police), its ranks and structure are similar to those of the Dominican Army.

=== Ecuador ===
The National Police of Ecuador (Policía Nacional del Ecuador) is the only national police force and the main civil law enforcement agency of the country, and its subordinate to the Ministry of the Interior. In addition to its functions as a security police force, it has a specialized investigative division, the Judiciary Police (Policía Judicial).

=== El Salvador ===
Law enforcement in El Salvador is a national civilian police. It covers the Salvadoran territory, and it has five divisions (Traffic, Tourism, General Inspection, Community, and its academy). The National Civil Police was constituted on the Article 159 to establish after the Salvadoran Civil War, and maintained by the Ministry of Justice and Public Safety.

=== Egypt ===
The Egyptian National Police, a department of the Ministry of Interior, is responsible for law enforcement in Egypt. The Central Security Forces, a paramilitary force, is responsible for assisting the police. The Egyptian Army also has a Military Police Corps divided into 24 battalions.

=== Estonia ===
Law enforcement in Estonia is carried out by the Police and Border Guard Board, an agency of the Estonian Interior Ministry. It is divided into the Estonian Police and Estonian Border Guard. The Estonian Police, responsible for civilian law enforcement, is divided into four territorial police units called prefectures and three national units: the Central Criminal Police, the Central Law Enforcement and the Forensic Service Center. The Estonian Border Guard is an armed organization charged with protecting the nation's borders on land and sea.

=== Ethiopia ===
The Ethiopian Federal Police is the federal law enforcement agency of Ethiopia. It maintains law and order at the federal level, including riot control, and investigates organized crime. The regions of Ethiopia maintain their own regional police commissions. The Ethiopian Federal Police provides operational support to the regional police commissions, coordinates between them, and sets national policing standards.

=== Fiji ===
Fiji has a unified national police force, the Fiji Police, responsible for law enforcement throughout the country. The only other police force is a local police service on Rabi Island.

=== Finland ===
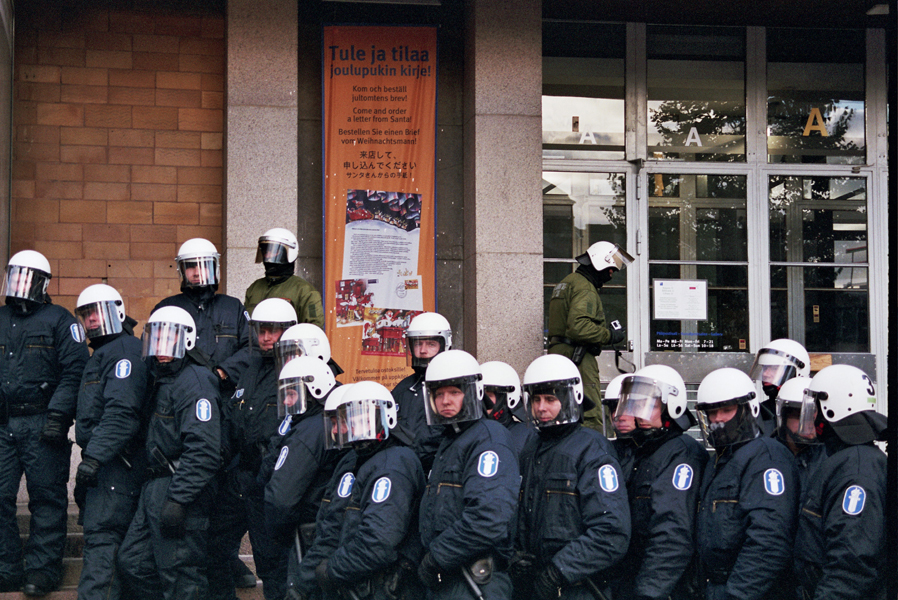
Riot police unit of the Finnish Police.

Law enforcement in Finland is under the jurisdiction of the Finnish Police. The National Bureau of Investigation (NBI) (Finnish: Keskusrikospoliisi, KRP) is a national unit tasked with "crime prevention and provision of expert services." Civil protection, including counter-terrorism, is handled by The Finnish Security Intelligence Service (FSIS) (Finnish: Suojelupoliisi, SUPO).

=== France ===
France has two national police forces, the National Police and National Gendarmerie. The National Police is the main civil law enforcement agency in France, with primary jurisdiction in cities and large towns. The National Gendarmerie, a branch of the French Armed Forces under the jurisdiction of the Ministry of the Interior, polices smaller towns, rural, and suburban areas. About 3,500 municipalities also employ municipal police, who are under the direct authority of the mayor. The national capital Paris is policed by the Paris Police Prefecture, a subdivision of the Ministry of the Interior. Some rural communes also have a Garde champêtre, or rural guard, responsible for limited local patrol and environmental protection. Only certain designated police officers within the two national police forces have the power to conduct criminal investigations, which are supervised by investigative magistrates.

=== Georgia ===
The Georgian Police, which is a division of the Ministry of Internal Affairs, is responsible for law enforcement in Georgia.

=== Germany ===
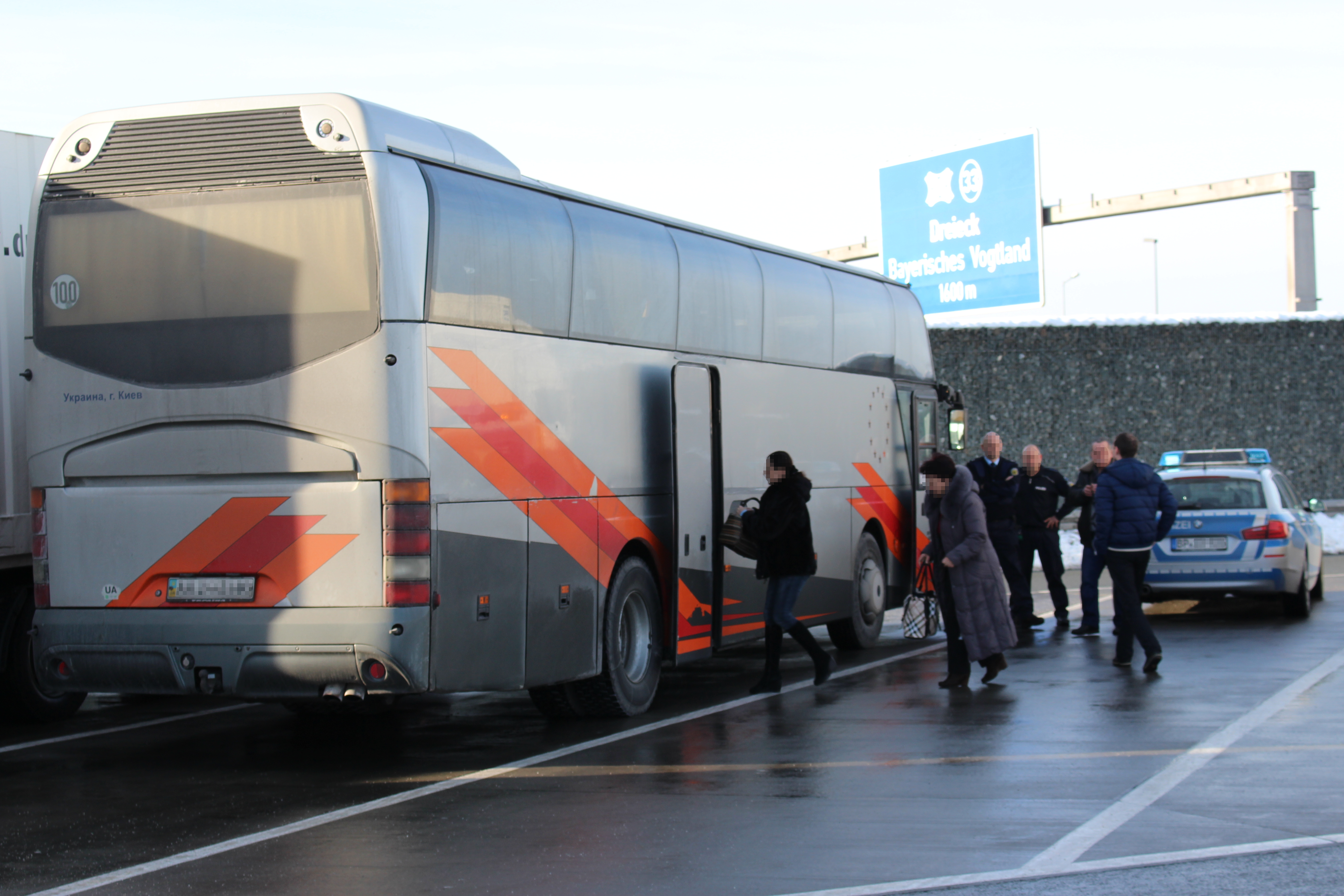
Members of the German Federal Police stop a bus to search it, in an effort to combat drug trafficking.

Germany is a federal republic of sixteen States (Land). Each one of those States has its own police force called Landespolizei (State Police), that provides basic law enforcement and crime fighting services. Each Landespolizei is supervised by the respective State Minister (or, in the City States of Bremen, Hamburg and Berlin, the Senator) of Internal Affairs.

The Federal authorities have law enforcement agencies as well:

- the Bundeskriminalamt (BKA, "Federal Criminal Police Office") which is only responsible for cases which are exceeding the borders of a single State, or for cases of international dimension.
- the uniformed Bundespolizei (BPOL, in casual language also BuPo; "Federal Police"). Until 2005, the BPOL was called Bundesgrenzschutz ("Federal Border Protection"), but after expanded competences (e.g. for the railways) in the 1990s and the abolition of border controls in the European Union, its name was changed to emphasize the law enforcement nature of the corps in an international context.

Depending on the state's laws, the German cities also provide policing agencies like Stadtpolizei (Municipal Police) or Ordnungsamt (local bylaw agency).

=== Ghana ===
The Ghana Police Service is the main law enforcement agency of Ghana. It is organized at the national level and is divided into regional commands which report to National Headquarters. The Bureau of National Investigations is responsible for countering organized crime and financial crime, espionage, sabotage, terrorism, hijacking, piracy, and drug trafficking.

=== Greece ===
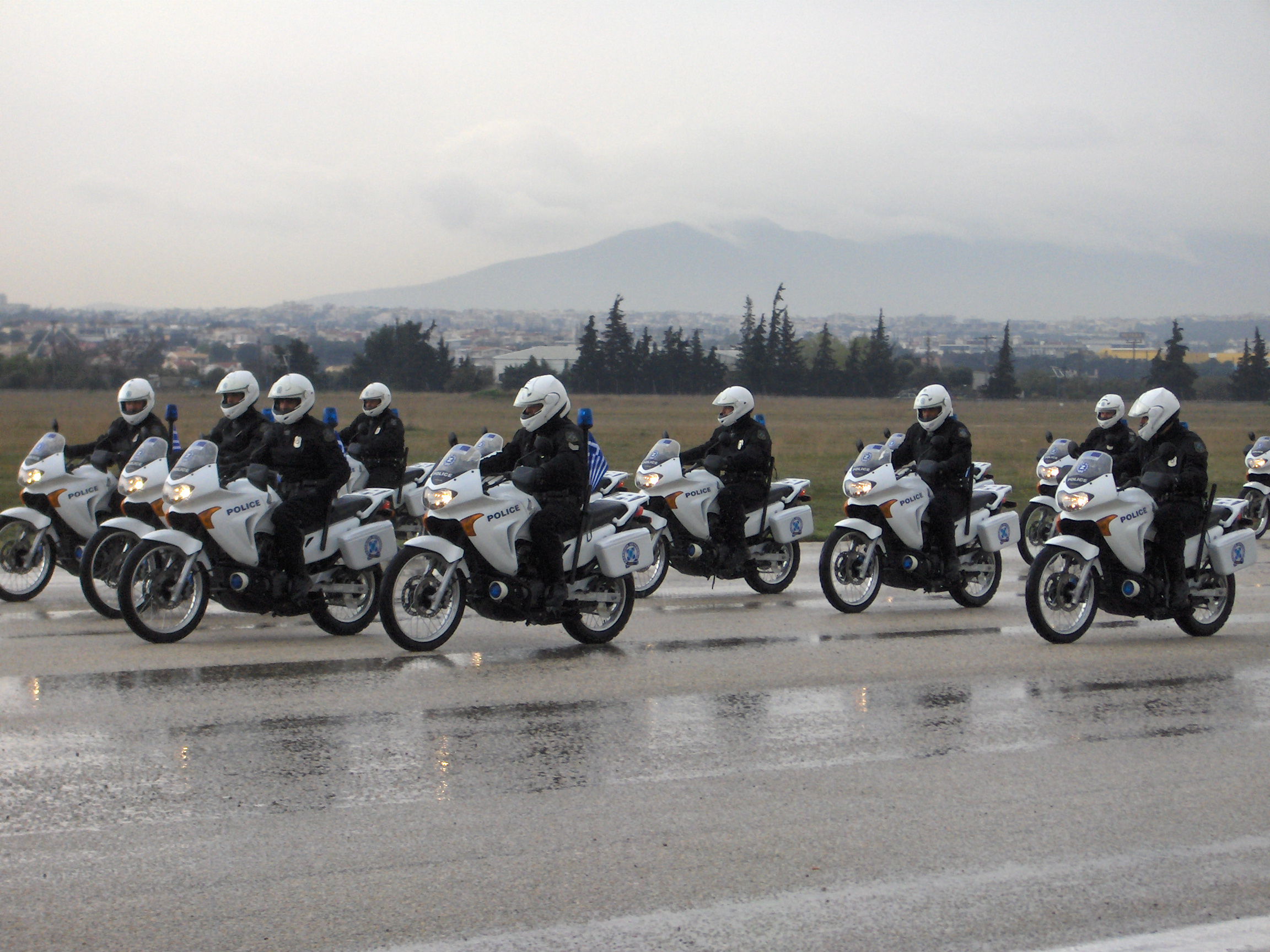
A number of Hellenic Police officers riding on police motorcycles.

The Hellenic Police Force (Greek: αστυνομία; [astinoˈmia]) is the police force of the Hellenic Republic. Tourism Police are an integral part of the Hellenic Police (ELAS), consisting of men and women specially trained and competent to offer tourists information and help, whenever they have any problems. They are trained in resolving minor differences between tourists and commercial enterprises. They all speak foreign languages, including English. They are distinguished by a shoulder badge displaying Tourism Police on their uniforms.

=== Guatemala ===
Civilian law enforcement is the responsibility of the national police force, the Policia Nacional Civil (PNC), which is divided into departments. The Armed Forces of Guatemala assist the civilian police in law enforcement tasks.

=== Haiti ===
The Haitian National Police (PNH; French: Police Nationale d'Haïti; Haitian Creole: Polis Nasyonal Ayiti) is the main law enforcement agencie of Haiti. The police force is divided into different divisions, many of these are specialized to address particular chronic crimes that affect the nation, including kidnapping, drugs and gangs; due this, some units have a de facto military nature. The force also manages the national Coast Guard service (Commissariat des Gardes-Côtes d’Haïti, G-Cd'H).

Since 2004, multinational forces from successive UN peacekeeping missions (such as the MINUSTAH and the MINUJUSTH) have carried out internal security and law enforcement duties in the country. From 2023, these tasks have been primarily undertaken by the Multinational Security Support Mission (MSS), which is composed mostly of members of the Kenya Police Service.

=== Honduras ===
The National Police of Honduras is the uniformed force responsible for maintaining public order and safety, as well as preserving law enforcement and compliance. Its jurisdiction covers all 18 departments of the country, with two independent metropolitan police headquarters in the capital and San Pedro Sula. Under each departmental headquarters, municipal headquarters operate, which include local police stations and outposts, creating a network of at least 360 physical facilities throughout the country.

=== Hungary ===
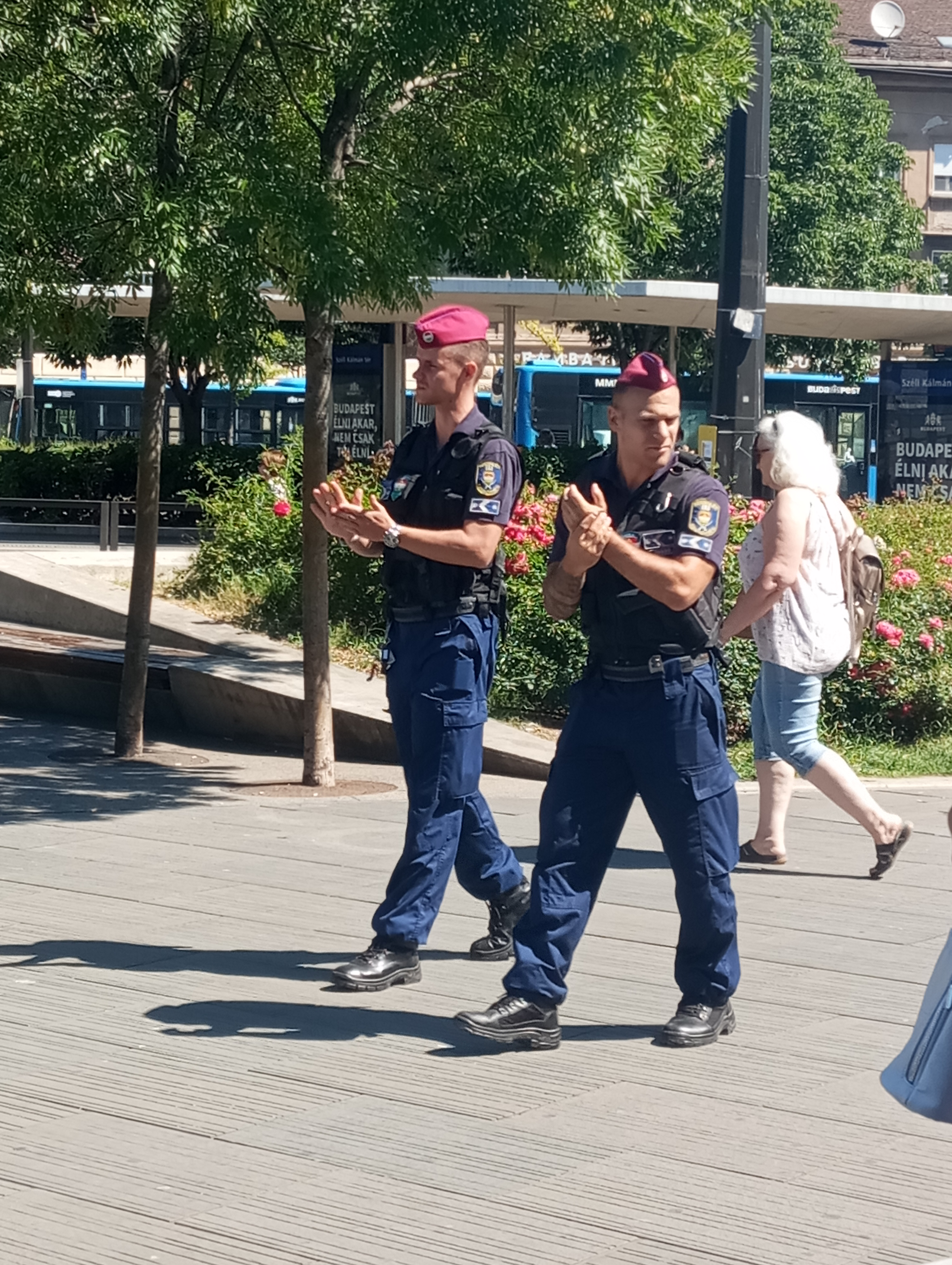
Two officers of the Hungarian Intervention Police.

Law enforcement in Hungary was formerly split between the Police (Rendőrség), Border Guards, and the Customs and Excise Authority. In 2008, the border guards were merged with the police service. The police force is maintained by the Minister of Justice.

=== Iceland ===
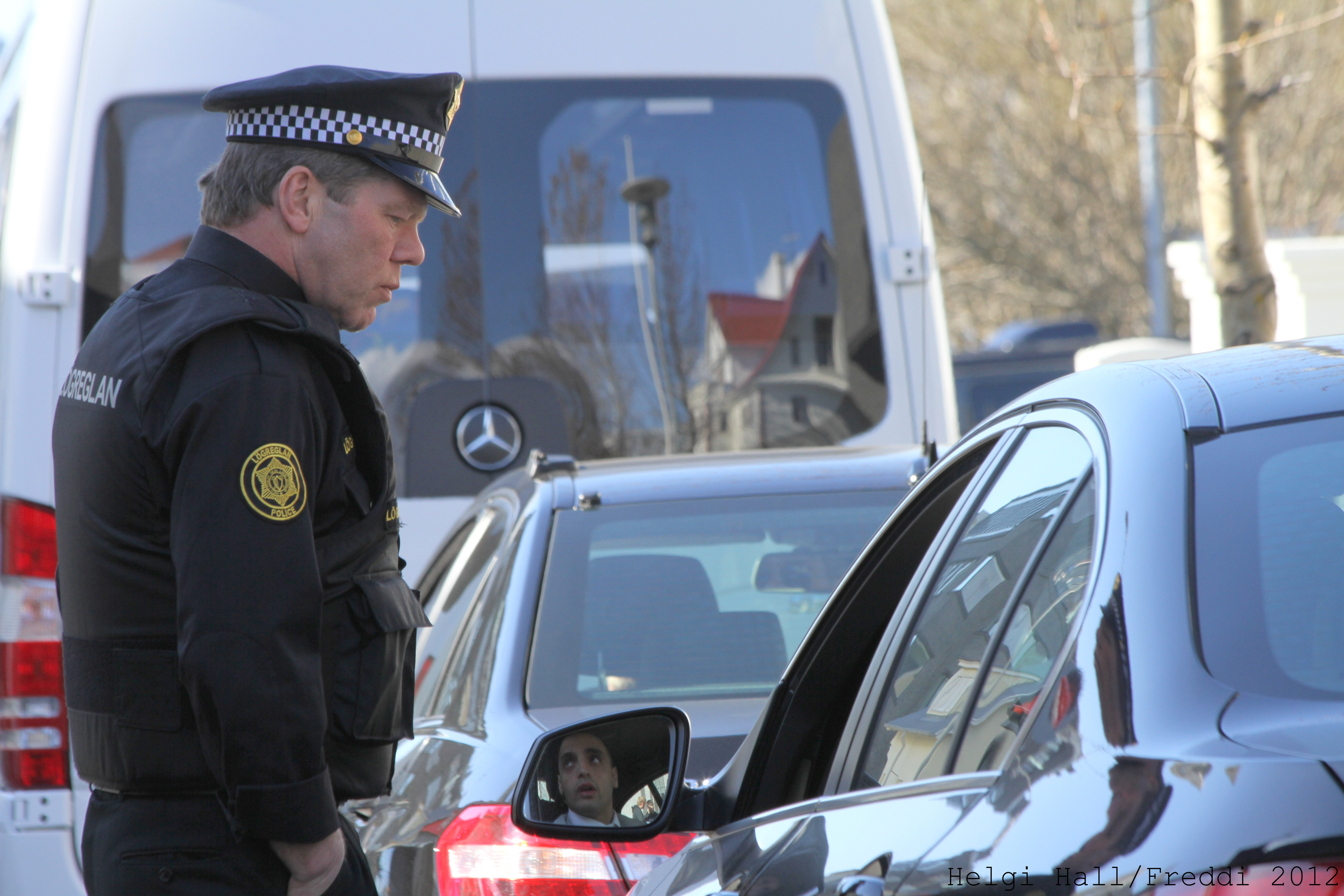
An officer of the Icelandic Police speaking with a man in traffic.

The Icelandic Police (Lögreglan) is Iceland's police force which is under the Ministry of the Interior. The National Commissioner is the overall commander, but he answers to the minister. The police is divided into 9 districts. Iceland also has a Directorate of Customs (Tollgæslan), whose job is to watch and guard imports and exports and more, which is under the Ministry of Finance and Economic Affairs. Icelandic police constables generally do not carry firearms, instead they carry telescopic batons and pepper spray. The National Commissioner has a Special operations unit which is called the Viking Squad (Víkingasveitin).

=== India ===
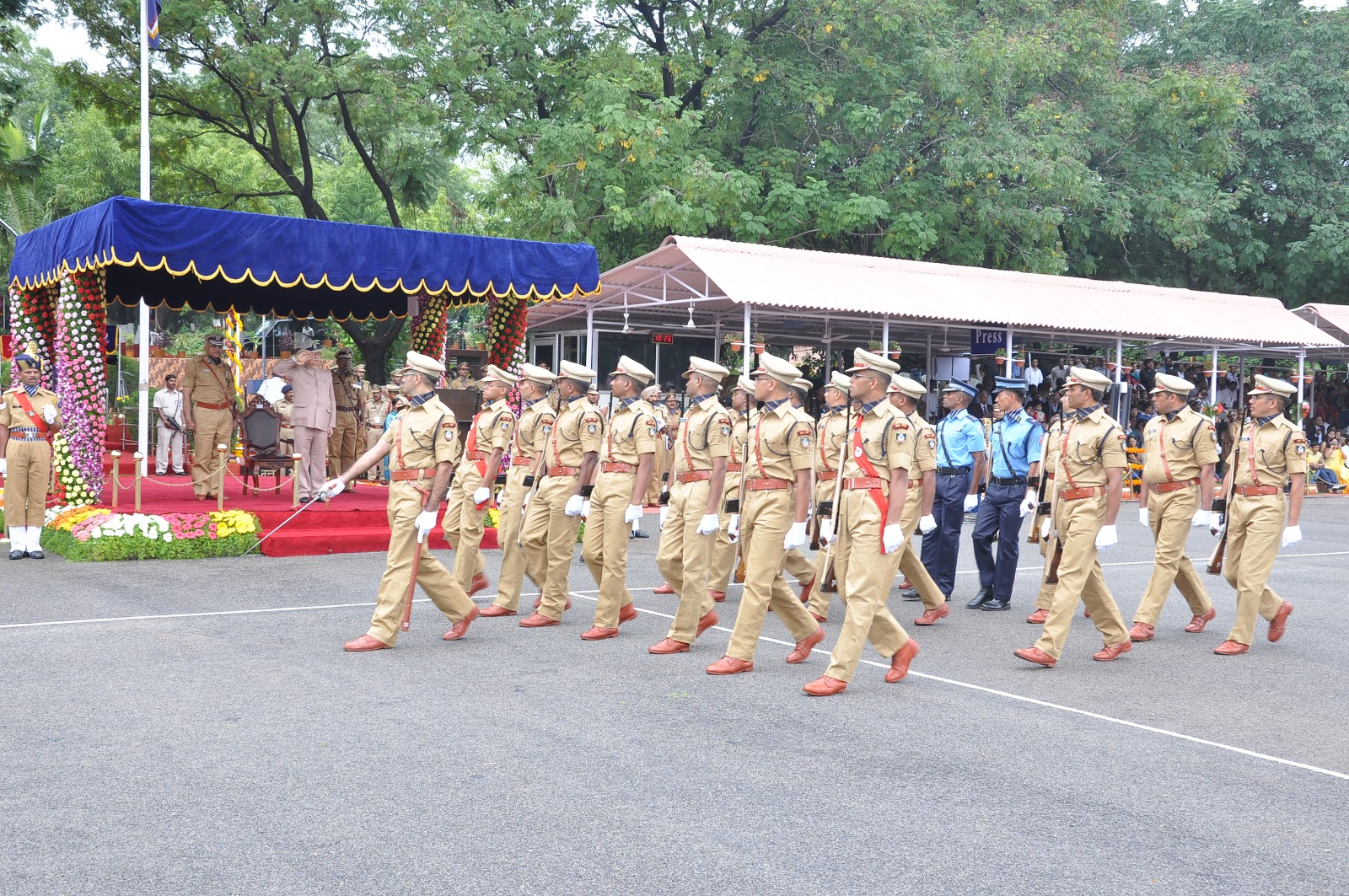
A passing out parade for officers of the Indian Police Service.

India has numerous law enforcement agencies. At the federal Union level, the agencies are part of the Union Ministry of Home Affairs, and support the states in their duties. India's federal police services controlled by the Ministry of Home Affairs are known as the Central Armed Police Forces and consist of the Border Security Force, Central Industrial Security Force, Central Reserve Police Force, Indo-Tibetan Border Police, National Security Guard, and Sashastra Seema Bal. Two other civil services with law enforcement tasks - the Indian Police Service and Indian Forest Service, are considered the All India Services: they are recruited at the federal level but serve under both the federal government and the states and union territories and also Indian Revenue Service, are considered the Central Civil Services: they are recruited and serve under federal level only. There are numerous other federal law enforcement agencies, including the Central Bureau of Investigation, National Investigation Agency, Directorate of Revenue Intelligence, Narcotics Control Bureau and Enforcement Directorate.

Since the federal nature of the Constitution of India mandates law and order and police as a subject of the state, therefore the bulk of the policing lies with the respective states and union territories. Each state and union territory (UT) has its own police department, which operates under the supervision and control of the respective state or UT's Home Department. These police forces are headed by a Director General of Police (DGP), who is an Indian Police Service (IPS) officer. Bigger cities operate their own metropolitan police forces, also under the state. Apart from the police, state governments also have law enforcement agencies such as the Vigilance and Anti-Corruption Bureau, Excise and Prohibition Department, Forest and Wildlife Department, and Motor Vehicles Department.

=== Indonesia ===
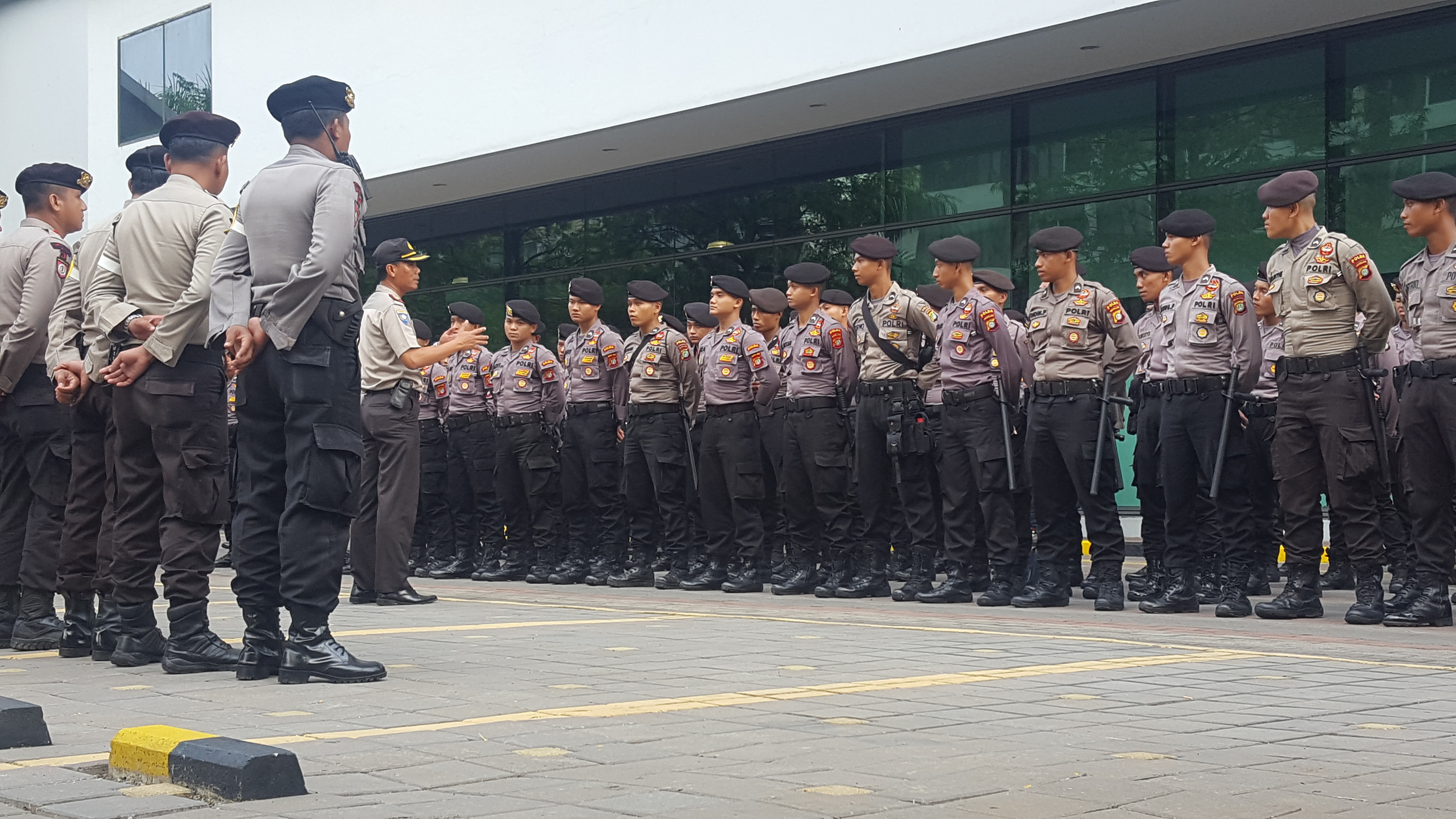
Indonesian National Police personnel on briefing in Jakarta.

Law enforcement in Indonesia is mainly performed by the Indonesian National Police (POLRI), together with other law enforcement agencies such as the Indonesia Forest Rangers, Remote Islands and Coastal Development Police, and Agricultural and Animal Quarantine Police, which are under the command of a certain ministry or State-owned company (BUMN) which perform policing duties for a certain public service, these law enforcement agencies are under supervision and are trained by the Indonesian National Police. The Indonesian National Police is basically the national civilian police force of the country responsible for enforcing law and order of the state. There are also municipal police units controlled by local governments. The Indonesian military maintains a Military Police Corps.

=== Iran ===
The Law Enforcement Force of the Islamic Republic of Iran is the civil law enforcement agency of Iran. It has numerous agencies including the Prevention Police, Security Police, Traffic Police, Cyber Police, Anti-Narcotics Police, Criminal Investigation Department, and Special Units. The Guidance Patrol enforces Iranian dress code laws. All military police agencies are overseen by the Central Provost of Islamic Republic of Iran Army.

=== Iraq ===
The Iraqi Police is the law enforcement agency of federal Iraq. Iraqi Kurdistan has a separate police force.

=== Ireland ===
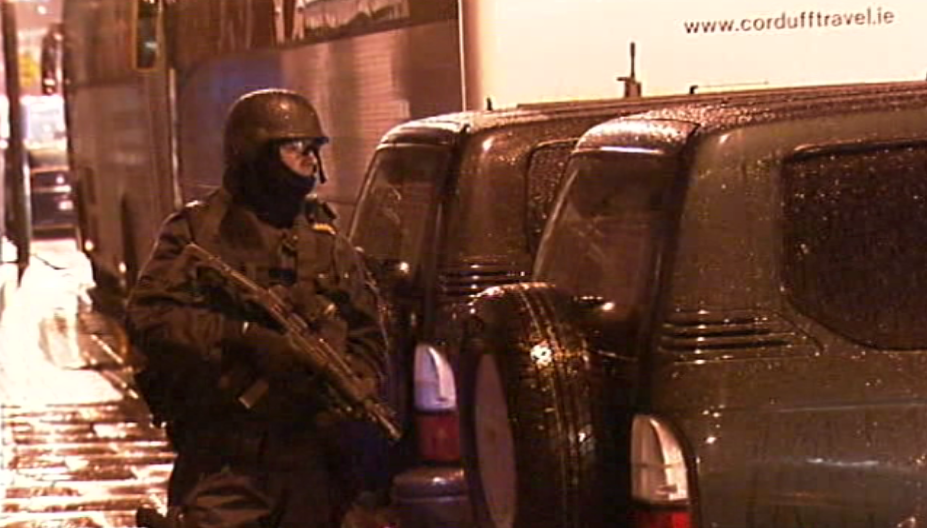
An armed officer of the Garda Síochána. Although the Garda Síochána is primarily unarmed, it does maintain an armed unit.

The Irish Police force, the Garda Síochána, translates to "Guardians of the Peace of Ireland". The state has one nationwide police force. All routinely uniformed officers are unarmed. The strength of the Garda Síochána is approximately 12,000 officers, of which 3,000 are licensed to carry firearms.

The Garda Síochána operates a number of specialist units including the GASU (Garda Air Support Unit, consisting of two helicopters and a BN-2A aircraft operated by the Irish Air Corps from Casement Aerodrome), Mounted Unit, Dog Unit, Public Order Unit and the anti-terrorism Special Detective Unit. It has a central command and control system for major city areas. Uniformed Gardaí wear stab-proof body armour and carry expandable ASP batons, handcuffs and pepper spray all introduced by the new Garda Inspectorate.

Armed support units include regional Armed Support Units (ASU) and the national Emergency Response Unit (ERU), which are comparable to American SWAT or British CO19 and operate a variety of lethal and non-lethal devices. All Gardaí (Police Officers) who train as detectives carry a sidearm.

=== Israel ===
The Israel Police (Mishteret Yisra'el) is the national police force of the State of Israel, responsible for civilian law enforcement. It falls under the jurisdiction of the Ministry of Public Security. The Israel Police has a traffic enforcement arm, the National Traffic Police, as well as the Civil Guard ("Mishmar Ezrahi"), a police unit made up of part-time volunteer officers. It also has a gendarme force, the Israel Border Police (MAGAV), which has its own elite counter-terrorist units. The Military Police Corps serves as the military police force of the Israel Defense Forces, responsible for law enforcement among soldiers and guarding military prisons. The Israel Prison Service oversees the Israeli civilian prison system.

Dozens of municipalities maintain their own municipal enforcement units, which are intended to deal with low-level offenses such as petty theft, vandalism, and noise complaints. The personnel of such units, who are called municipal inspectors, do not have arrest powers, but they may issue fines and detain suspects until the police arrive.

=== Italy ===
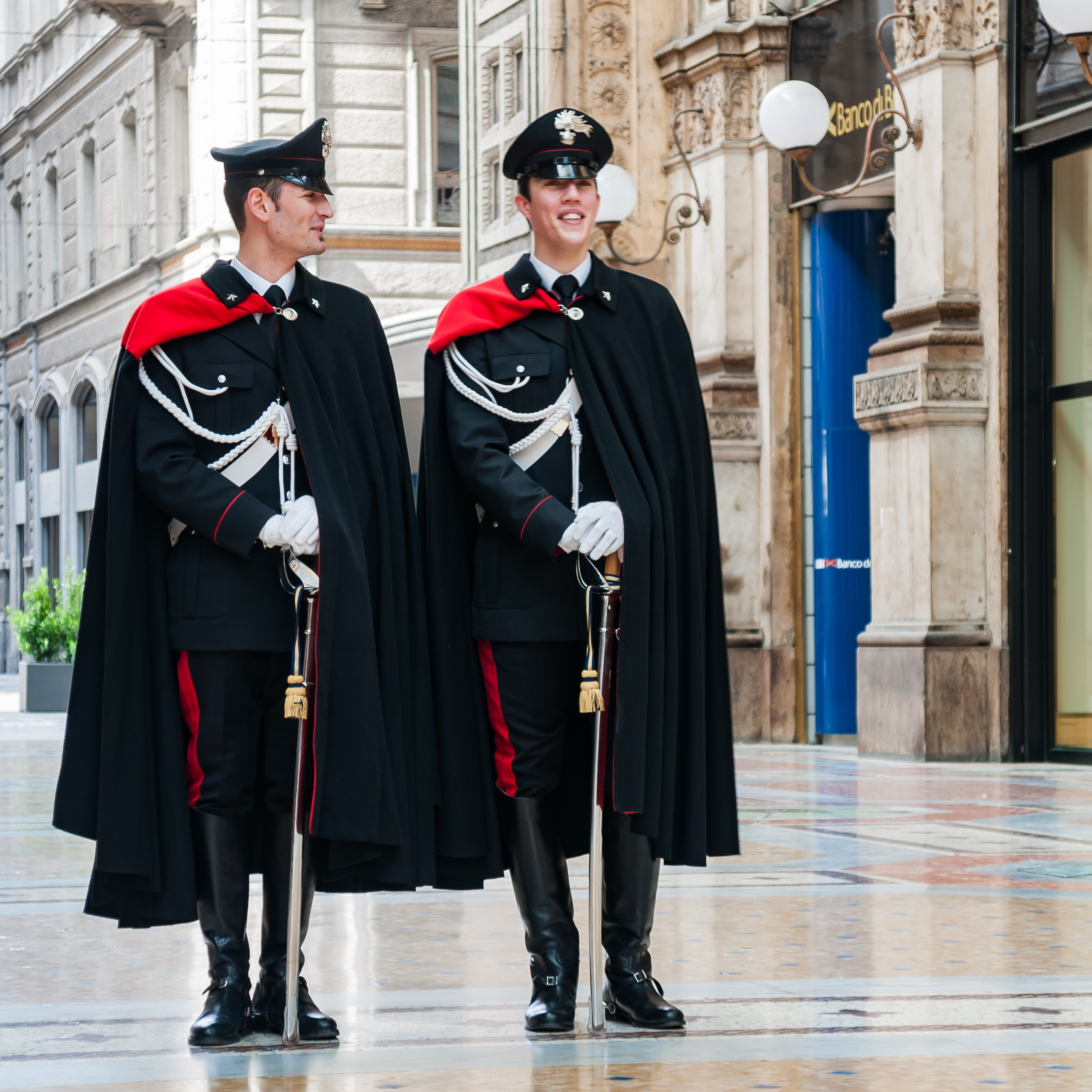
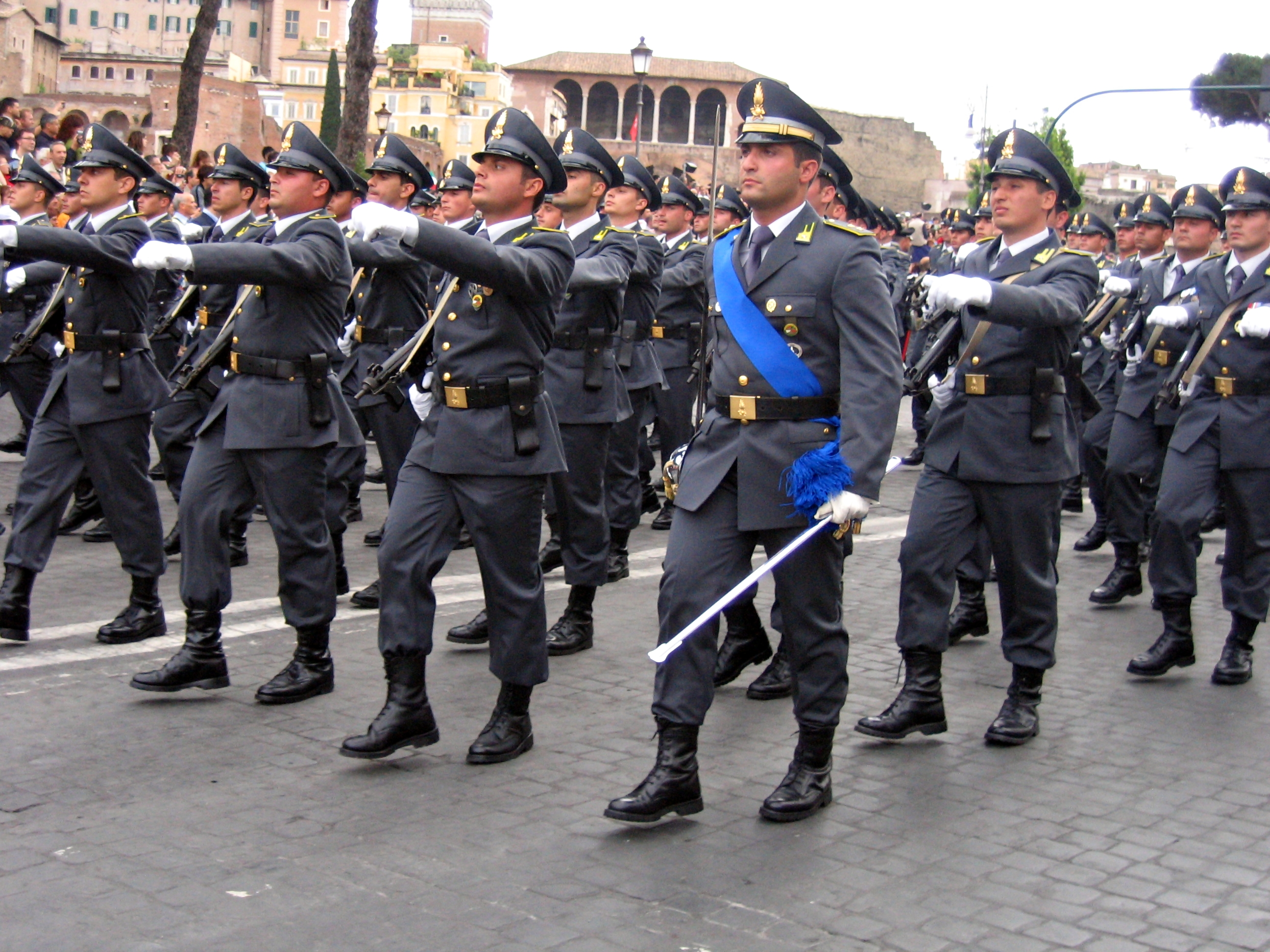
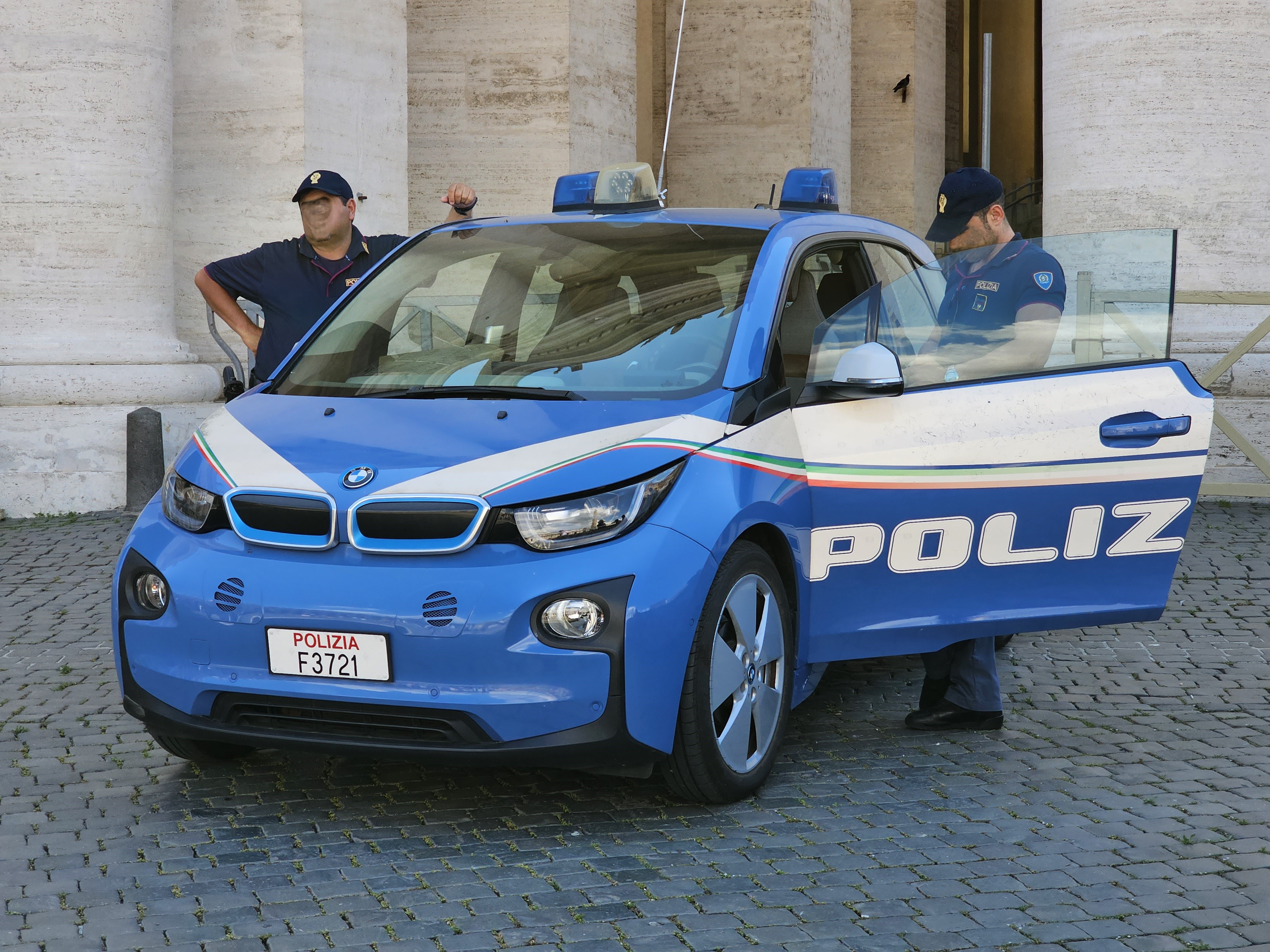
Three Official Police Corps from Italy (Arma dei Carabineri, Guardia di Finanzas and Polizia di Stato).

Law enforcement in Italy is mainly carried out by different agencies, depending on felony and jurisdiction. On a national level, four police forces operate. The Arma dei Carabinieri (gendarmerie), the Polizia di Stato (national civilian police) and the Guardia di Finanza (customs police, border police and financial police with military status); are the main forces, the only ones with full powers. There are also the Polizia Penitenziaria (prison service), in charge of keeping order in the prison system.

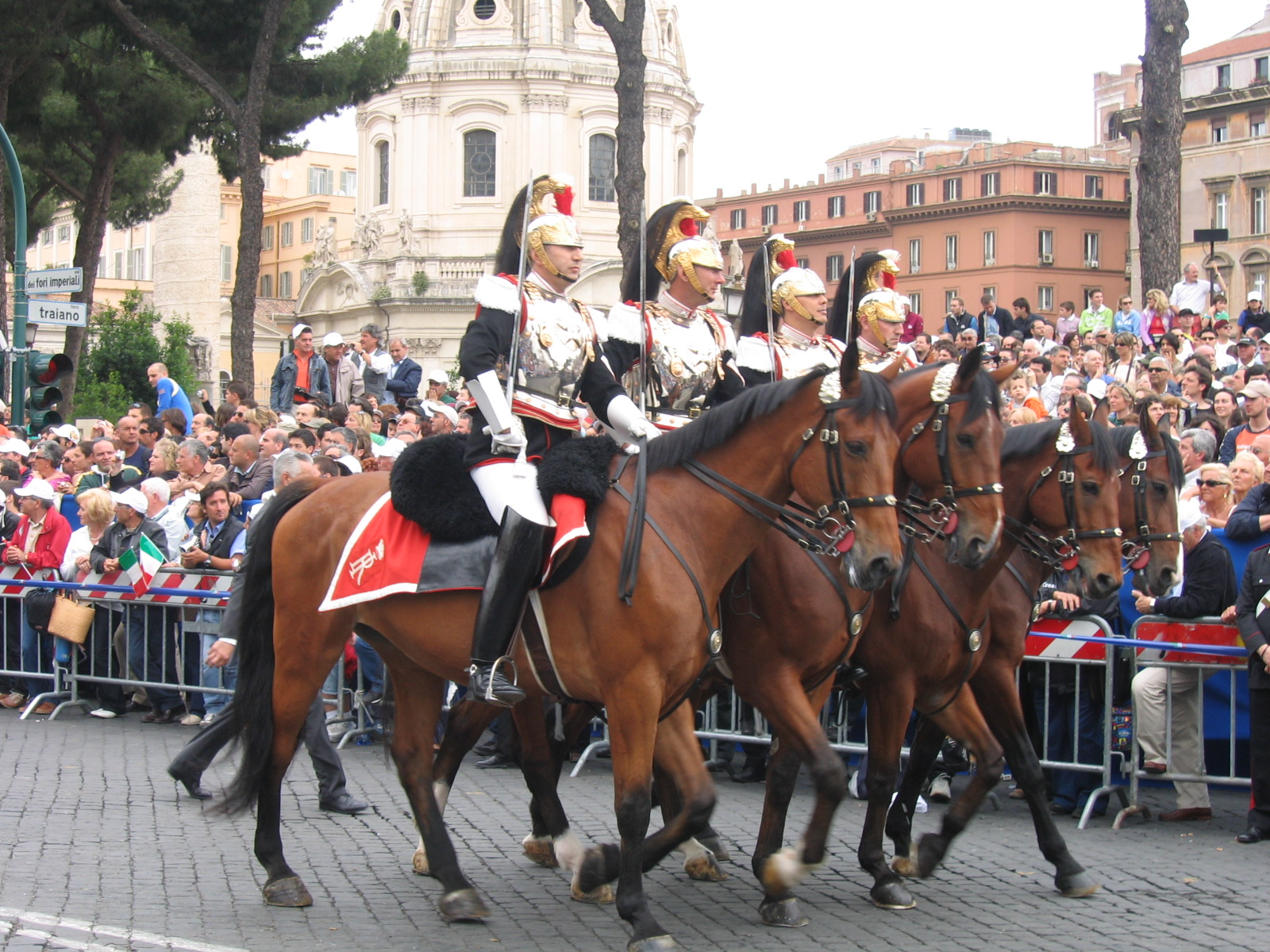
The Corazzieri is an honour guard unit provided by the Carabinieri, a Gendarmerie force in Italy.

Locally, with jurisdiction only in little felonies, There are also Polizia Provinciale in some of the 109 provinces of Italy, and Polizia Municipale in every comune. Even though they support other forces in drug dealing and thefts, their primary function is to patrol streets and prevent felonies. They have full police power in their jurisdiction and they also can do investigation.

The Carabinieri and Guardia di Finanza are organized as a military force. In recent years, Carabinieri units have been dispatched all over the world in peacekeeping missions, including Kosovo, Afghanistan and Iraq.

On a daily basis, calling the 112 emergency number only Polizia or carabinieri will answer as they are the only forces in charge of "Pronto Intervento" (non-sanitarian Emergency) and public safety.

=== Japan ===
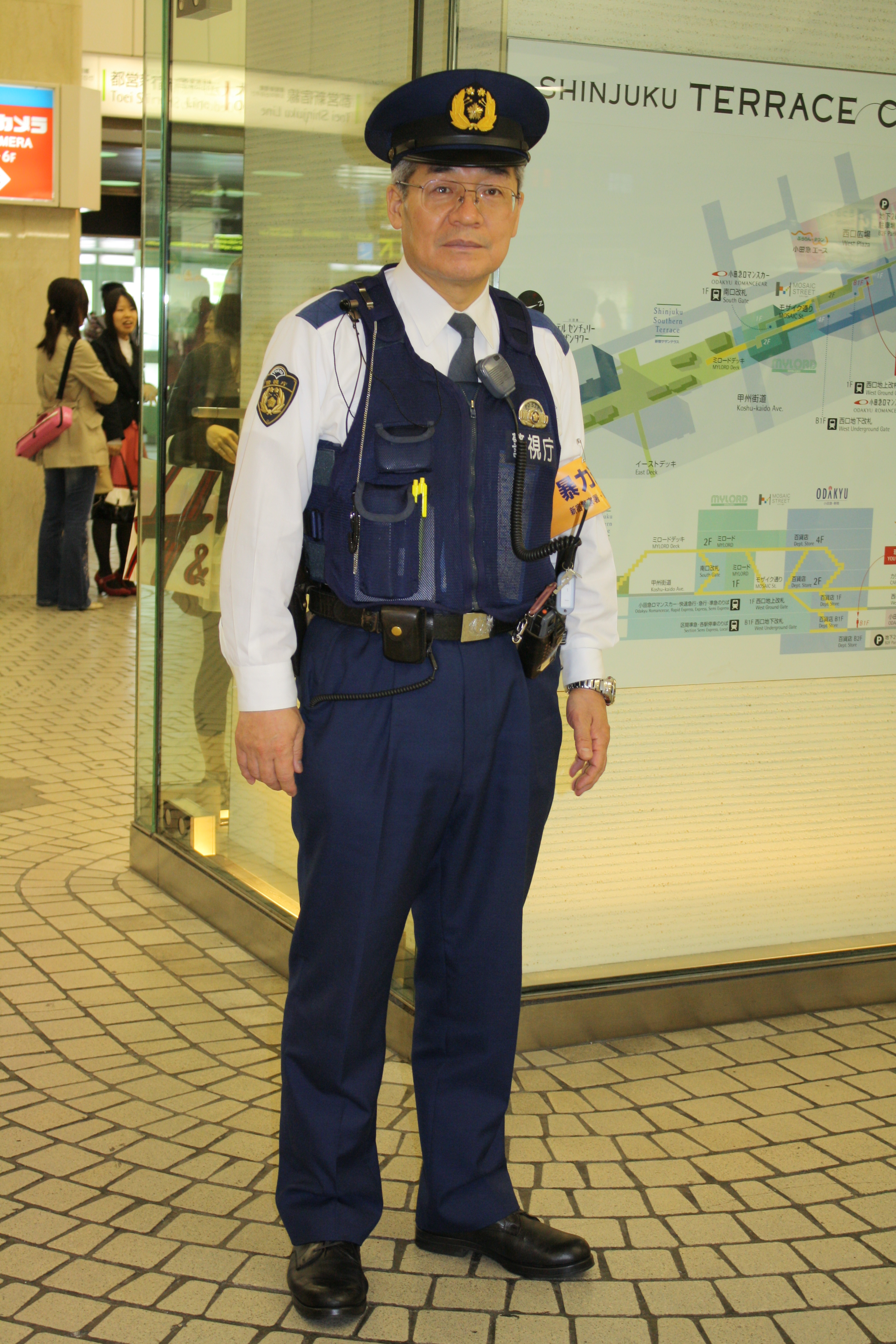
TMPD officer in Shinjuku Station of Tokyo.

Japan's prefectural police departments, which are responsible for policing their respective prefecture, are overseen by the National Police Agency, and free of direct central government executive control. They are checked by an independent judiciary and monitored by a free and active press. The police are generally well respected and can rely on considerable public cooperation in their work. There are also "special judicial police officers", consisting of the Imperial Guard, a security police force of the National Police Agency which protects the Imperial family and Imperial properties, prison guards, who are employees of the Ministry of Justice, narcotics agents and Labor Standards Inspectors of the Ministry of Health, Labor, and Welfare, authorized fisheries inspectors and officers of Regional Forest Offices of the Ministry of Agriculture, Forestry, and Fisheries, military police officers of the Japan Self-Defense Forces, and Japan Coast Guard officers.

=== Jordan ===
Law enforcement is carried out by the Public Security Directorate, the national police force which lies under the jurisdiction of the Ministry of Interior.

=== Kazakhstan ===
Law enforcement in Kazakhstan is handled by the Kazakhstan police (Қазақстан полициясы, Qazaqstan polisiasy), under the authority of the Ministry of Internal Affairs, which also operates a National Guard with gendarmerie-like duties. Heir of the soviet style security organization, country's internal security and intelligence operations are shared between those agencies, the National Security Committee (which also manages the Border Service forces), and the Office of the Prosecutor General.

=== Kenya ===
The Kenya Police is responsible for civilian law enforcement. It maintains a number of specialized branches:

- Administration Police - Responsible for protective and border security services along with countering cattle theft and banditry
- Criminal Investigation Department - Investigates complex cases
- General Service Unit - A paramilitary wing of the police

The Kenya Wildlife Service is responsible for wildlife conservation and protection, particularly against poaching, and the Kenya Forest Service protects the forests and enforces revenue measures for exploitation of forest products. The Kenya Prison Service is responsible for guarding prisons.

=== Kosovo ===
The Kosovo Police (Albanian: Policia e Kosovës) is the only national policing law enforcement agency of Kosovo. It consists of five departments and eight regional directorates and is represented at the political level by the Ministry of Internal Affairs and Public Administration. The Police Inspectorate of Kosovo is an institution that supervises the operations of Kosovo Police; it can investigates criminal offences conducted by police officers, as well as violations of operating standards and laws by the institution as a whole.

=== Latvia ===
Latvia has three national law enforcement forces. The main one is the State Police, with security and investigative functions throughout the country. It falls under the authority of the Ministry of the Interior, which also manages the State Border Guard. The State Security Service, for its part, serves as an agency for internal security and the defense of constitutional order. There are also municipal police forces.

=== Lebanon ===
Law enforcement in Lebanon is the responsibility of the Internal Security Forces.

=== Luxembourg ===
The Grand Ducal Police (French: Police Grand-Ducale; Luxembourgish: Groussherzoglech Police or simply d'Police) is since 1 January 2000 the sole law enforcement agency in the Grand Duchy of Luxembourg. The Police is under the authority of the Luxembourgish Minister for Public Security, although it operates in the name, and under the ultimate (ceremonial) control of the head of state, the Grand Duke of Luxembourg.

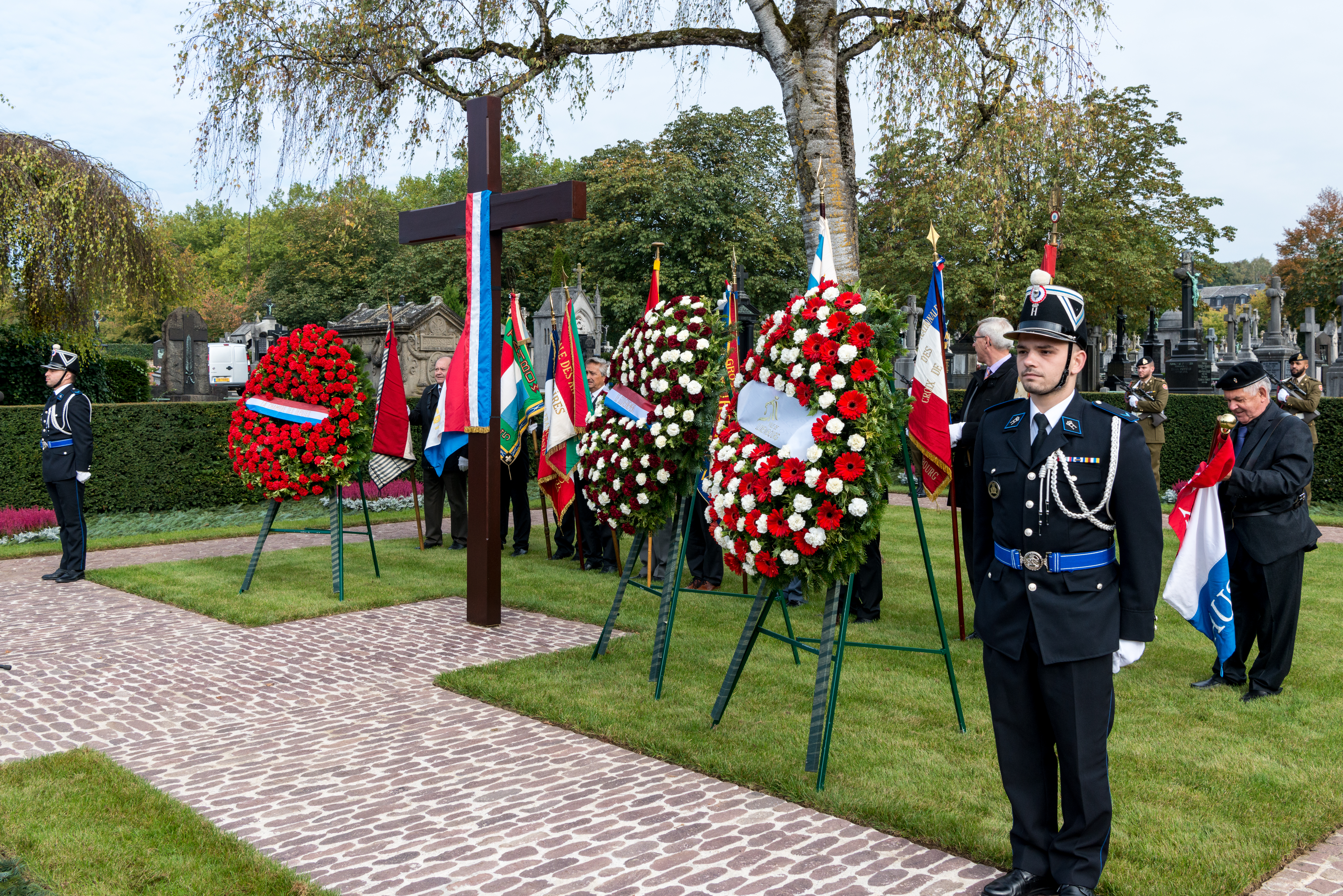
Officers of the Grand Ducal Police during a commemoration ceremony of the German occupation of Luxembourg during World War II.

Previously, the Luxembourgish law enforcement agencies (as well as the Army) were under the command of the Minister of Public Force, a cabinet post that no longer exists.

The Grand Ducal Police was created in its current form on 1 January 2000, when the Grand Ducal Gendarmerie merged with the State-controlled local police forces.

The Grand Ducal Police is responsible for ensuring Luxembourg's internal security, fighting crime and corruption, maintaining law and order and enforcing all laws and Grand Ducal decrees. It is also responsible for assisting the Luxembourgish Army in its internal (war-time) operations, in accordance with the respective legislation and under the authority of the national Commander-in-Chief, the Grand Duke.

Municipal regulations are enforced by "Municipal agents" (French: Agents municipaux; Luxembourgish: Gemengenagenten), who are partly uniformed but always unarmed municipal employees (no police officers) with strictly limited enforcement powers.

=== Lithuania ===
Law enforcement in Lithuania is the responsibility of a unified national police force, the Lithuanian Criminal Police Bureau, which is under the jurisdiction of the Interior Ministry. From the Police Bureau of the Ministry of Internal Affairs, which is led by the Police Commissar General, the police force branches out to the National and Municipal Police. The National Police is composed of the criminal police, traffic police, public security force and public police.

=== Malaysia ===
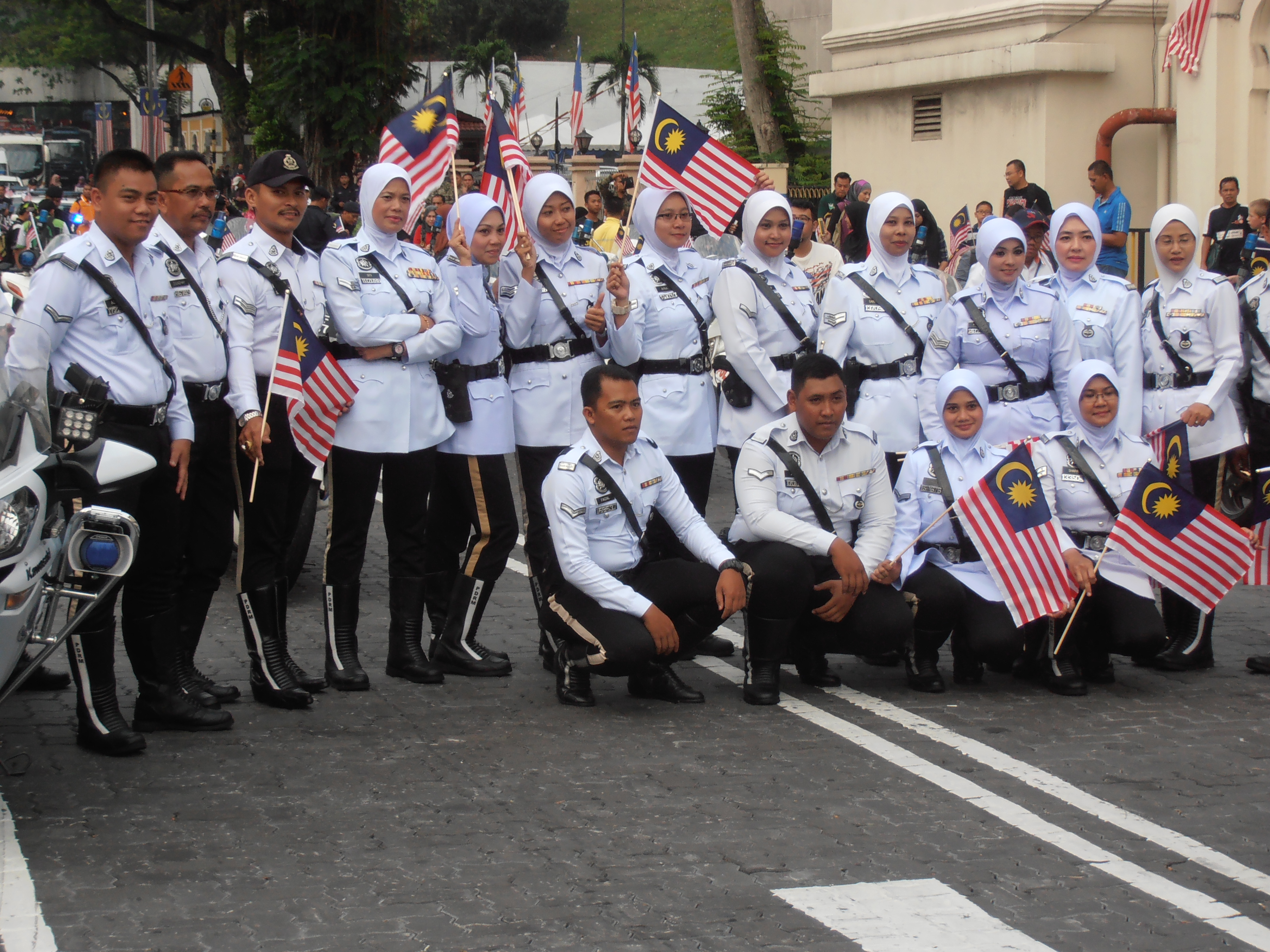
Traffic police of the Royal Malaysian Police.

The Royal Malaysian Police or Polis Diraja Malaysia in Malay is a main branch of security forces in Malaysia. Established on 25 March 1807, the force is a centralized organization that has a gamut of roles that ranges from traffic control to intelligence. Its headquarters is located in Bukit Aman, Kuala Lumpur and divided into 14 state police, including two on East Malaysia consist of Sabah State Police and Sarawak State Police. During the emergency period, the force is a major security forces to track down the communists.

The force has seven departments, which consist of 2 tasked with police management and logistic with 5 tasked for multi-crimes prevented, intelligence and security service. The riot control force known as Federal Reserve Unit makes up part of the police force.

In addition to the Federal Reserve Unit, the Police maintain 2 paramilitary divisions: the General Operations Forces, which includes the Senoi Praaq which grew out of the Emergency Jungle Squads, and the special force: the Pasukan Gerakan Khas (PGK); Special Operations Command; SOCOM of Federal Police), which includes the VAT 69 Police Commandos and UTK. VAT 69 commando battalion is the special force based on by SAS for fight against the communist threats and the Special Action Units (Malay: Unit Tindakan Khas), which is modelled on SWAT teams for dangerous crimes prevented and close protections. Besides, the force also created the maritime police special forces known as Police Combat Diving Unit or Unit Selam Tempur, who tasked the security of Straits of Malacca, Sulu Sea and South China Sea from the piracy activities and terrorism.

The Rakan Cop is the Malaysian community police which was launched in 2006.

=== Malta ===
The Malta Police Force is the national police force of Malta, and is responsible for all policing functions. It is overseen by the Ministry of Home Affairs.

=== Mauritius ===
The law enforcement agency of Mauritius is the Mauritius Police Force. The Commissioner of Police (CP) heads the organisation which forms part of the Home Affairs Division of the Prime Minister's Office (PMO).

=== Mexico ===
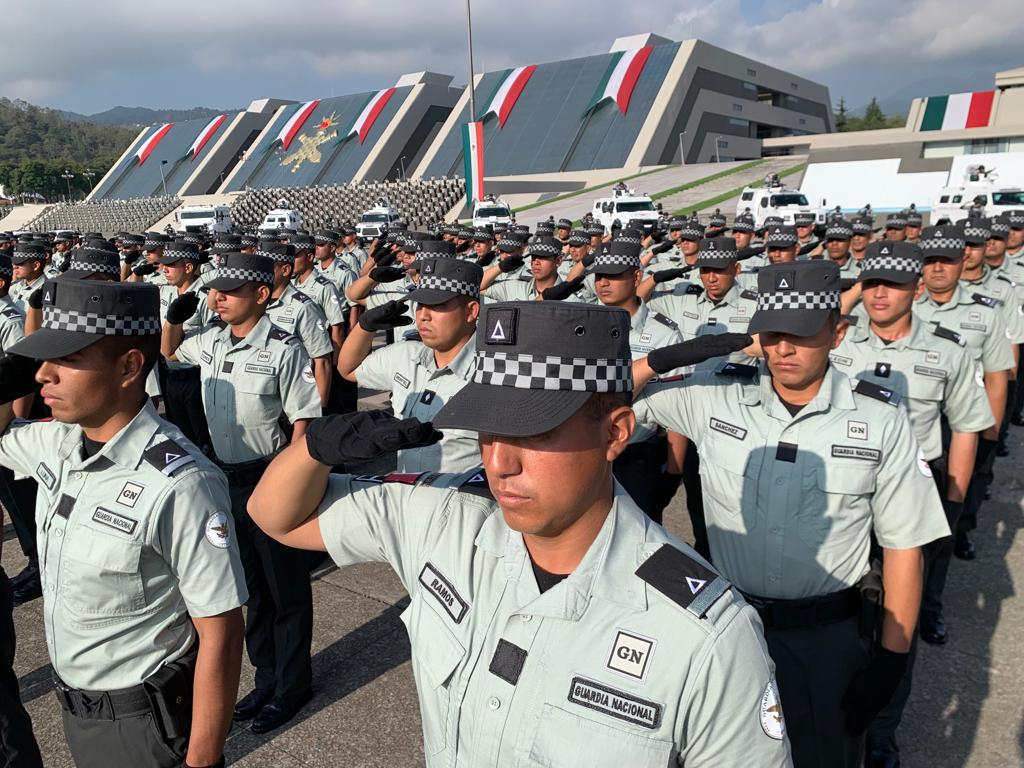
National Guard officers during 3rd Anniversary of Mexican National Guard in 2022.

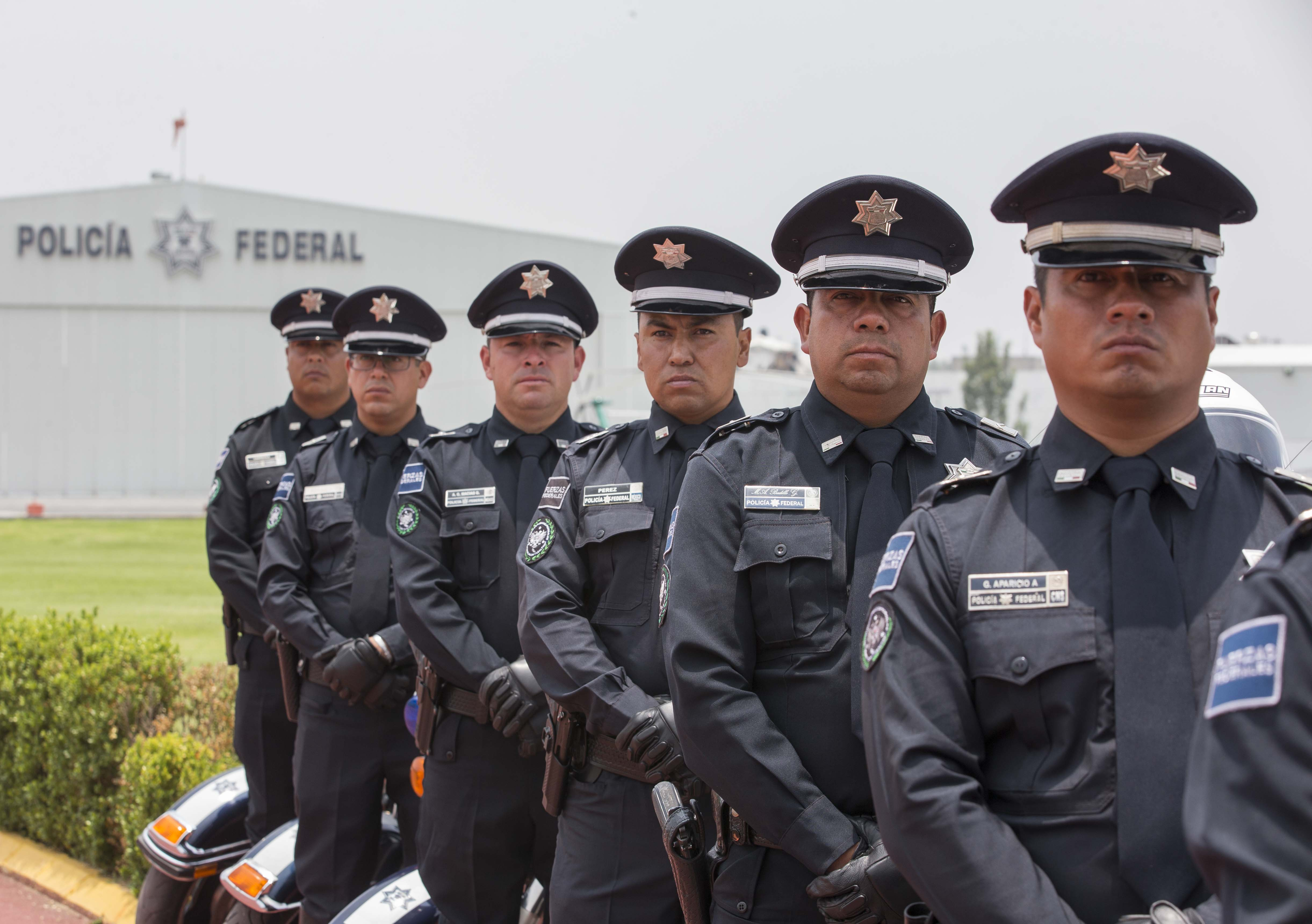
Former Mexican Federal officers during Federal Police Day celebration in 2013

Police forces in Mexico are classified by their jurisdiction and authority into federal, state and municipal forces. Mexico's law enforcement agencies include the National Guard as main federal law enforcement authority, and independent state and municipal police forces.

Within these categories, there is also a division between agencies according to their nature as "preventive" police (the uniformed agents in charge of crime prevention and compliance with administrative regulations, such as the Mexico City Police), or Investigative agencies (sometimes called "ministerial police"). The last ones obey the authority of the prosecutor's offices (for example, the Attorney General's Office at federal level), while the others depend directly on the executive power at federal, state or municipal level.

=== Moldova ===
Moldova has two national police forces, both under the authority of the Ministry of Internal Affairs. The General Police Inspectorate is the primary civilian police agency with authority over the entire country, in close cooperation with municipal police departments. The country also has a gendarmerie force, the Trupele de Carabinieri (lit. "Carabinier Troops").

=== Morocco ===
The Moroccan police is called Sûreté Nationale. The force is tasked with upholding the law and public order. It works alongside the Royal Moroccan Gendarmerie, the Gendarmerie body of the Royal Moroccan Armed Forces.

=== Myanmar ===
The Myanmar Police Force or MPF, which is overseen by the Ministry of Home Affairs, is the national police force of Myanmar. It is divided into State and Regional Police Forces, which have District Police and Township Police forces under their jurisdiction. There are 16 combat police battalions that carry out general security duties, and 26 Anti-Narcotic Task Forces. The MPF has multiple specialized divisions such as the Border Guard Police or BGP and the Special Intelligence Department or SID.

=== Nauru ===
The Nauru Police Force is the single police agency within Nauru, responsible for all law enforcement and internal security tasks within the Republic of Nauru.

=== Netherlands ===
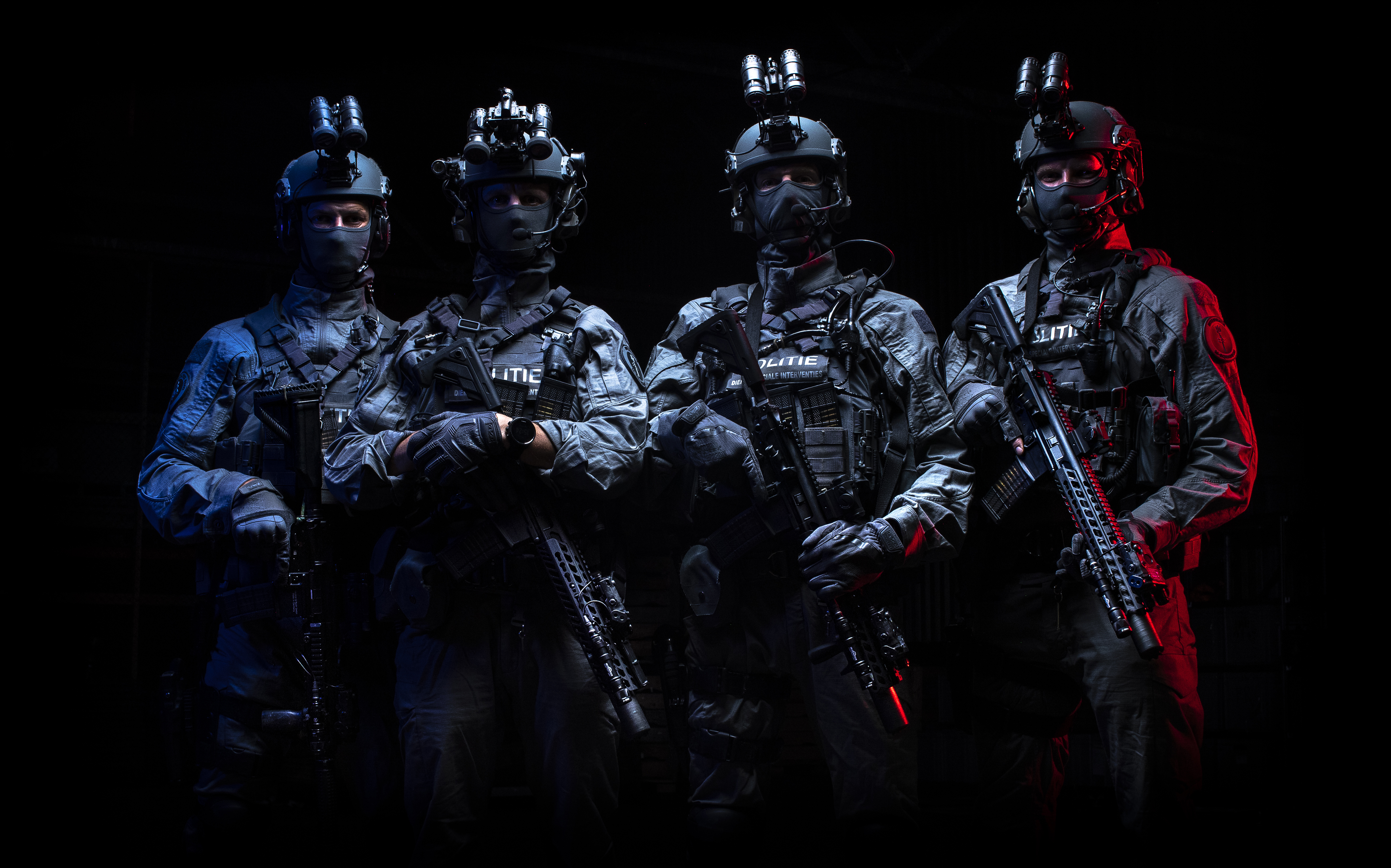
Special intervention officers of the Dutch police.

The National Police Corps is a government agency charged with upholding the law, public order, and providing aid. It is also the investigation service for the Attorney General of the Judiciary. The national police are made up of ten regional units and two national ones, one for expertise and operations, the other for investigation and intervention. In addition, supporting divisions of the national police include the Police Services Center, Police Academy, and National Dispatch Center Cooperation. The current chief of the Dutch Police is Janny Knol. Police duties at airports, borders, and royal residences are provided by the Royal Military Constabulary (Gendarmerie), together with Private security companies for airports. Local laws, codes, parking, and "Quality of life" issues are enforced by municipal enforcement officers (Handhaving). These officers, together with park rangers, public transport security personnel, and attendance officers have special enforcement officer status (Buitengewoon Opsporings Ambtenaar or Extraordinary Investigating Officer) which allows them to issue fines, detain people, and make arrests. Their policing powers are limited, though they often have the power to use force and handcuffs but generally only carry less-lethal weapons, like batons and pepper spray.

=== Nepal ===
The Nepal Police is a government body responsible for enforcing law and order in Nepal. Along with Armed Police Force, the police of Nepal is responsible for maintaining law and order and prevention of crime according to the constitution of Nepal and is under the authority of the Ministry of Home Affairs.

Nepal Police has total 67,416 police personnel and has 2,344 permanent and 507 temporary police offices and units spread all over the country. The present chief of Nepal Police is Chandra Kuber Khapung and chief of Armed Police Force is Raju Aryal

=== New Zealand ===
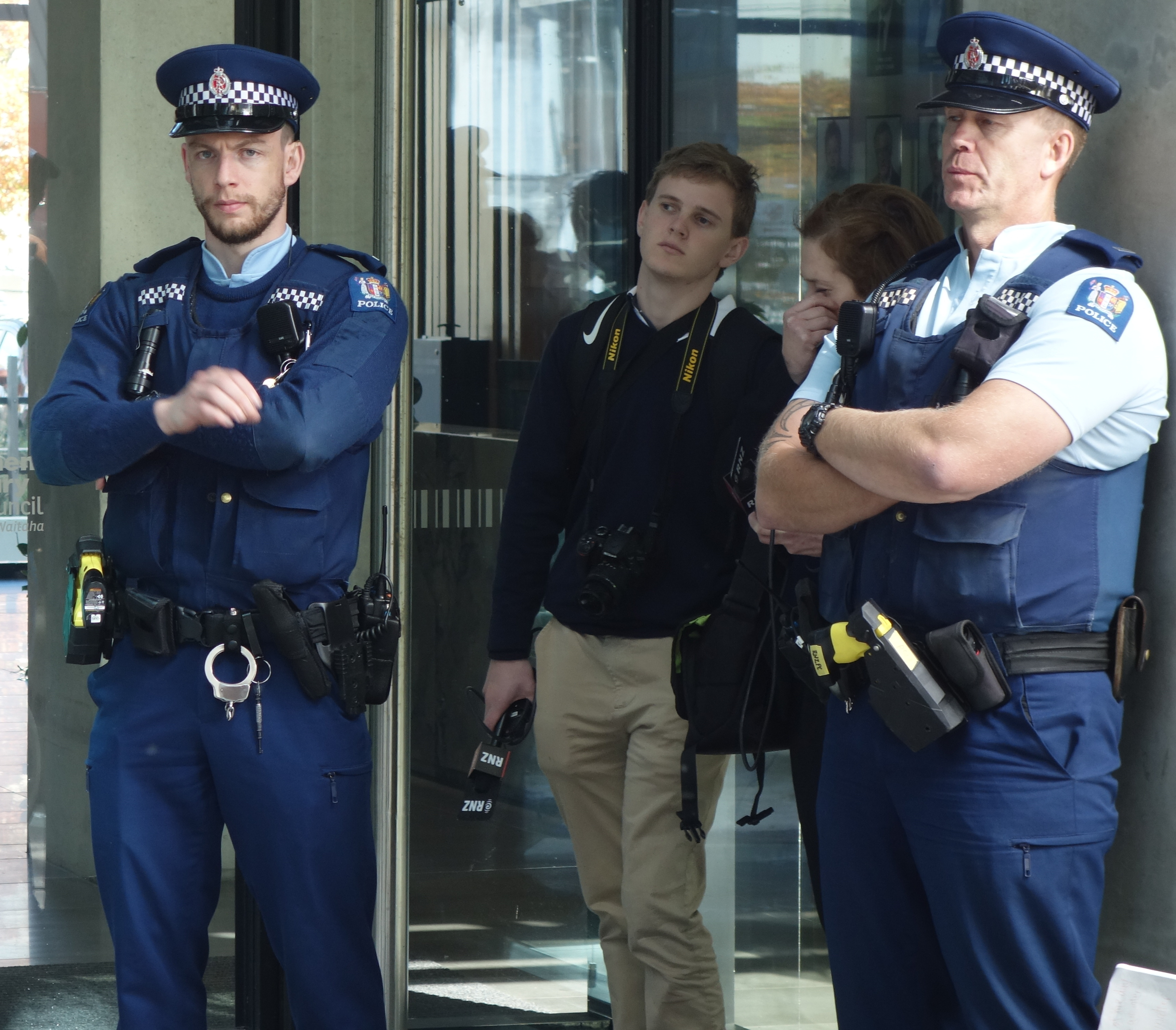
Two NZP officers at a protest

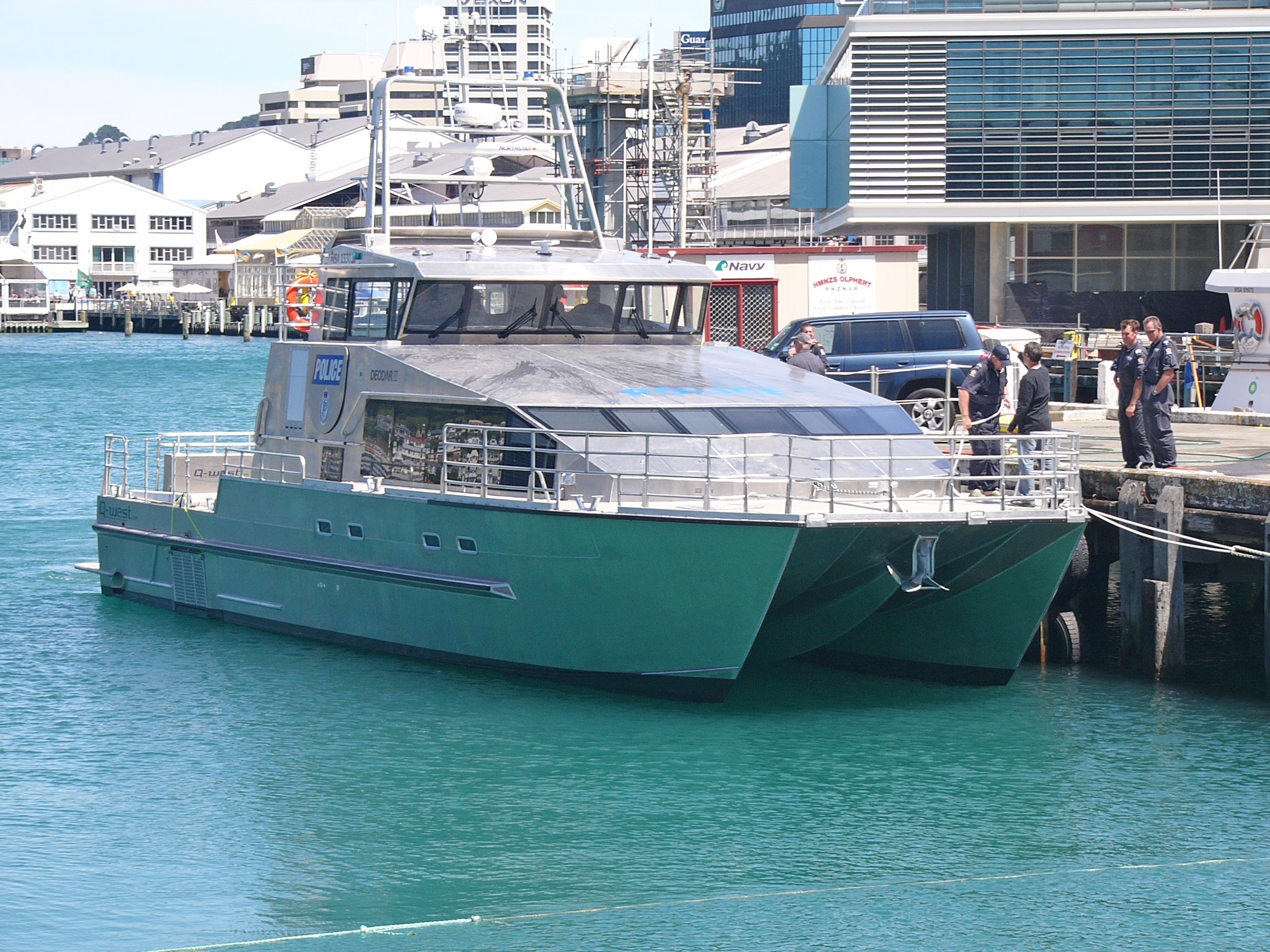
The New Zealand Police prepare to launch the Deodar III, a police watercraft.

The New Zealand Police are charged with enforcing law in New Zealand. They are a single national police force with a broad policing role (community safety, law enforcement & road safety). New Zealand police officers do not normally carry firearms, although access to firearms is available when circumstances dictate. Specialised units of the New Zealand Police such as the Armed Offenders Squad, a SWAT type unit and the Special Tactics Group are also operational for different scenarios that might arise. New Zealand Police work with other government agencies and non-government groups to achieve the best safety outcomes for all New Zealanders.

=== Nicaragua ===
The National Police of Nicaragua is responsible for law enforcement, and sometimes works in conjunction with the Nicaraguan military, making it an indirect and rather subtle version of a gendarmerie.

=== Nigeria ===
The Nigeria Police Force is the sole civilian police force in Nigeria. It is under the control of the federal government – there are no state or municipal police forces in Nigeria. It has a paramilitary arm, the Nigerian Mobile Police.

=== Norway ===
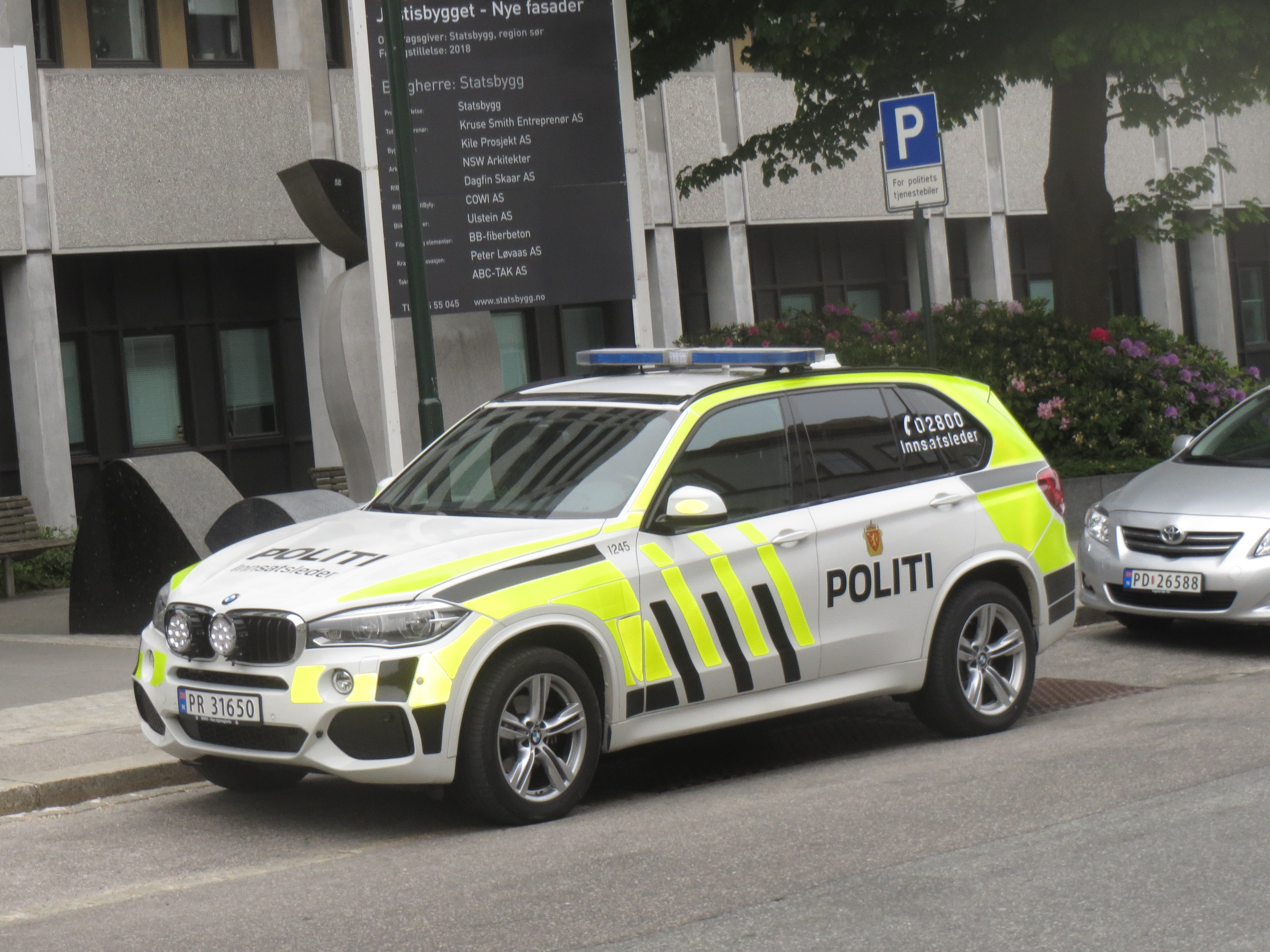
A police car used by the Norwegian Police Service.

The Norwegian national police force (Norwegian: Politiet) is subordinate to the Ministry of Justice and Police. The Politiet is divided into 27 regional police departments and seven nationwide special departments. In total the force has about 11,000 employees, with the Oslo police precinct, as the largest, accounting for 2,300.

Officers of the Norwegian police usually do not carry firearms, making the force one of the few unarmed police organizations in the world. They are instead armed with telescopic batons and pepper spray.

=== Pakistan ===
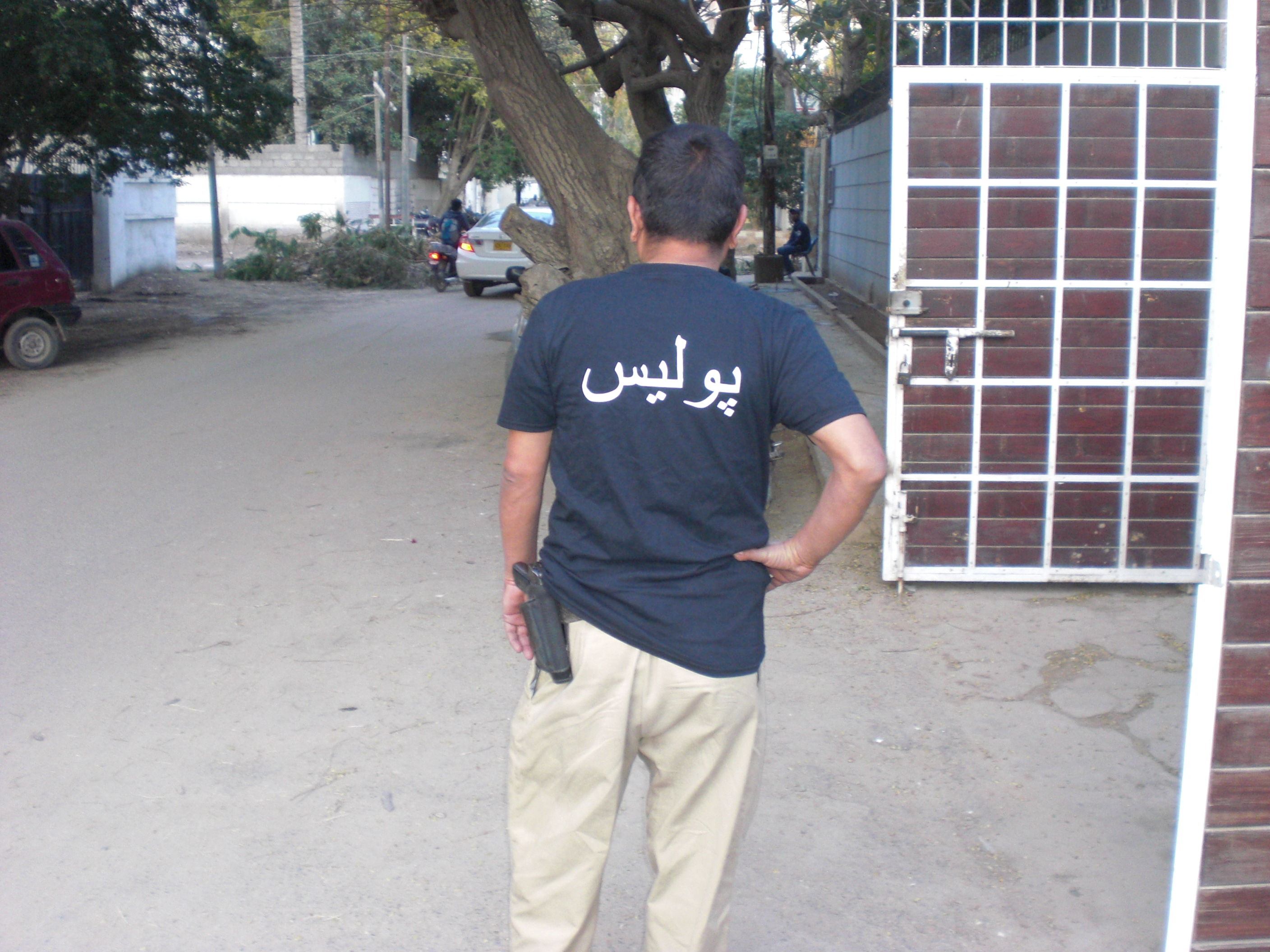
Sindh police constable of Sindh province of Pakistan.

The police in Pakistan are under the control of the province they work in, with each police having jurisdiction in its own province and its leadership headquartered in the province's capital. A separate traffic police department exists for managing traffic and is also a provincial force. Only the capital city police are an exception, and is under federal government control with its own setup. In Punjab a counter-terror unit elite force within the Punjab Police was created in 1998.

A separate paramilitary organization in the eastern provinces (Punjab and Sindh) known as the Rangers exist for providing security in the country and to assist the police whenever needed. They also under the control of the province they work in. Their equivalents in the western provinces (Balochistan and Khyber Pakhtunkhwa) are the Frontier Corps (FC).The Civil Armed Forces are a group of nine paramilitary and gendarmerie organisations, separate and distinct from the regular Pakistan Armed Forces. They are responsible for maintaining internal security, helping law enforcement agencies, border control, counter-insurgency and counter-terrorism, riot control, and anti-smuggling under the Ministry of Interior. They frequently operate alongside the Pakistani military in response to natural disasters. During times of war they can have their command transferred to the Ministry of Defence, and effectively combined to form a reserve force for the Pakistani military.

=== Panama ===
The Panamanian National Police, a branch of the Panamanian Public Forces, is responsible for civilian policing functions. It is divided into different police zones across the country.

=== Papua New Guinea ===
The Royal Papua New Guinea Constabulary is the name of the Police force in Papua New Guinea. There are also 20 mobile squads paramilitary under the Special Services Division of the Royal Papua New Guinea Constabulary which is headed by a Director. The Director reports to the Assistant Commissioner who reports to the three deputy Commissioners who are under the Commissioner of Police.

=== Paraguay ===
The National Police of Paraguay is responsible for law enforcement and internal security. It operates under the auspices of the Ministry of Internal Affairs.

=== Peru ===
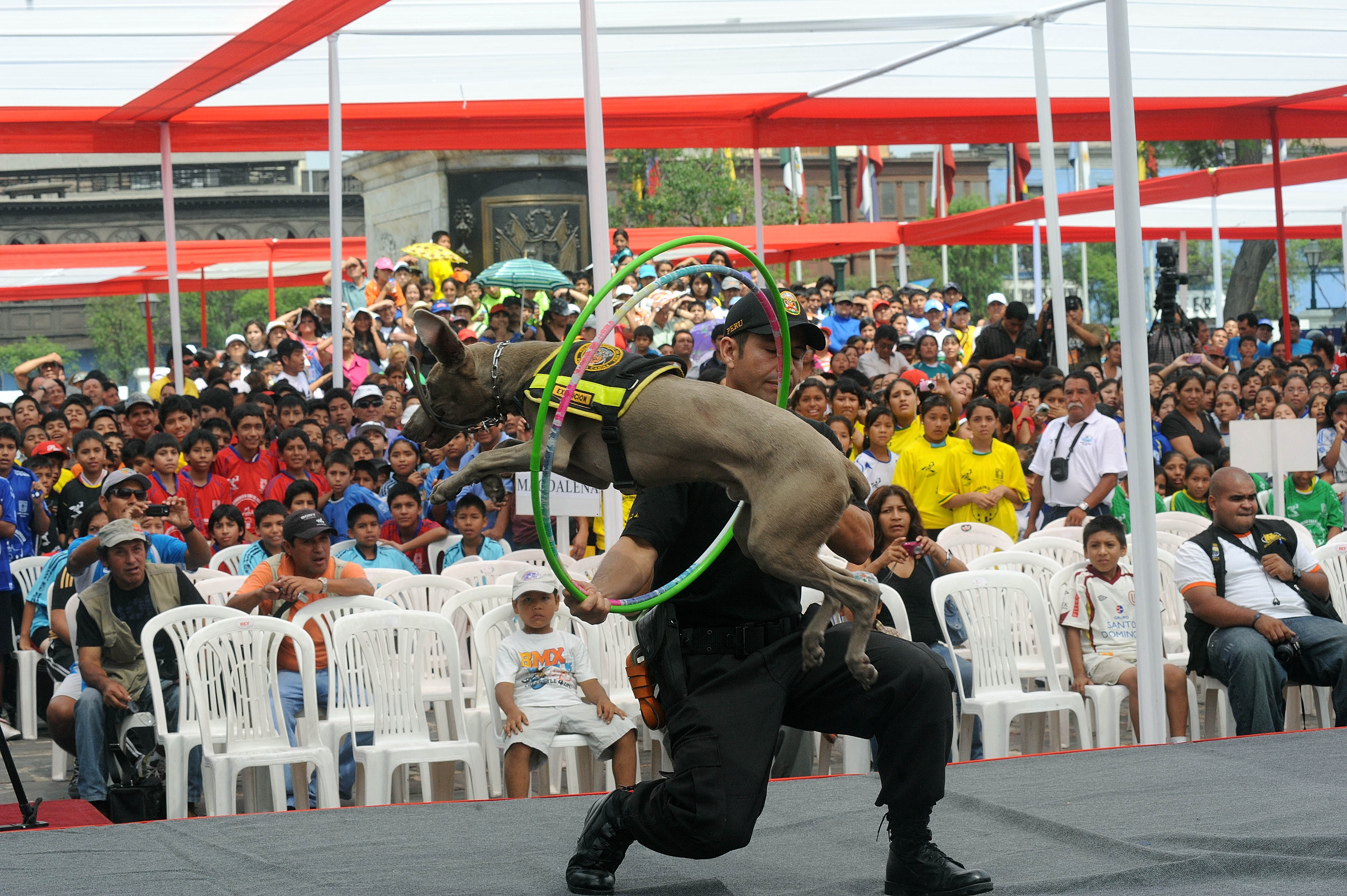
A police dog jumps through a hoop held by its handler, during an exhibition held by the National Police of Peru.

The national police force in Peru is called the National Police of Peru (Policía Nacional del Perú) or PNP. They are the state police force, but serve many of the same roles in the cities that local police forces assume in other countries, such as traffic control at intersections. Peruvian cities (or Lima-area districts) each have their own Serenazgo forces, which perform patrol duties like a neighborhood watch and call upon the PNP as needed.

=== Philippines ===
The Local Government Code of the Philippines mandates the Barangays to enforce peace and order and provide support for the effective enforcement of human rights and justice, resolving and/or mediating conflict at the barangay level through non-adversarial means. Recourse to this Barangay Justice System is required, with some specific exceptions, as a pre-condition before filing a complaint in court or any government offices.

At the national level, law enforcement in the Philippines is handled by two agencies: the Philippine National Police (PNP) and the National Bureau of Investigation (NBI). Community policing is done by un-armed barangay tanods who are hired and supervised by their local barangays, the smallest elected government in the Philippines. Barangay Tanods are often described as volunteers but they do receive in some places small stipends and benefits such as health care. They have some limited training.

The thirteen operational support units and their respective functions are as follows:

- Maritime Group (MG). This group is responsible to perform all police functions over Philippine Territorial waters, lakes, and rivers along coastal areas to include ports and harbors and small islands for the security and the sustainability development of the maritime environment.
- Intelligence Group (IG). This group serves as the intelligence and counter-intelligence operating unit of the PNP.
- Drug Enforcement Group (DEG). This group arrests drug lords in pursuant with the Anti-illegal drug law.
- Police Security and Protection Group (PSPG). This group provides security to government vital installations, government officials, visiting dignitaries and private individuals authorized to be given protection.
- Criminal Investigation and Detection Group (CIDG). This group monitors, investigates, prosecutes all crimes involving economic sabotage, and other crimes of such magnitude and extent as to indicate their commission by highly placed or professional criminal syndicates and organizations. It also conducts organized- crime –control, all major cases involving violations of the revised penal Code, violators of SPECIAL LAWS assigned to them such as Anti-hijacking, Anti-Carnapping and Cybercrimes among others and atrocities committed by Communist Party of the Philippines (CPP)/New People's Army (NPA)/National Democratic Front (NDF).
- Special Action Force (SAF). This group is a mobile strike force or a reaction unit to augment regional, provincial, municipal and city police force for civil disturbance control, internal security operations, hostage-taking rescue operations, search and rescue in times of natural calamities, disasters and national emergencies and other special police operations such as ant-hijacking, anti-terrorism, explosives and ordnance disposal. On a special note, the PNP Air Unit is placed under the supervision of SAF.
- Aviation Security Group (AVEGROUP). This group provides security to all airports throughout the country.
- Highway Patrol Group (HPG). This group enforces the traffic laws and regulations, promote safety along the highways, enhances traffic safety consciousness through inter-agency cooperation concerning Police Traffic Safety Engineering, Traffic Safety Education and Traffic Law enforcement functions and develops reforms in the crime prevention aspect against all forms of lawlessness committed along National Highway involving the use of motor vehicles.
- Police-Community Relations Group (PCRG). This group undertakes and orchestrates Police Community Relations program and activities in partnership with concerned government agencies, the community, and volunteer organizations in order to prevent crime and attain a safe and peaceful environment.
- Civil Security Group (CSG). This group regulates business operations and activities of all organized private detectives, watchmen, security guards/agencies and company guard forces. It also supervises the licensing and registration of firearms and explosives.
- Crime Laboratory (CL). This group provides scientific and technical, investigative aide and support to the PNP and other investigative agencies. It also provides crime laboratory examination, evaluation and identification of physical evidence gathered at the crime scene with primary emphasis on medical, biological and physical nature.
- PNP Anti-Kidnapping Group (PNP-AKG). This Group serves as the primary unit of the PNP in addressing the kidnapping menace in the country and in handling hostage situations. And
- PNP Anti-Cybercrime Group (PNP- ACG). This Group is responsible for the implementation of pertinent laws on cybercrimes and anti-cybercrime campaigns of the PNP.
- PNP Air Unit. Provides helicopter to PNP personnels.

=== Poland ===
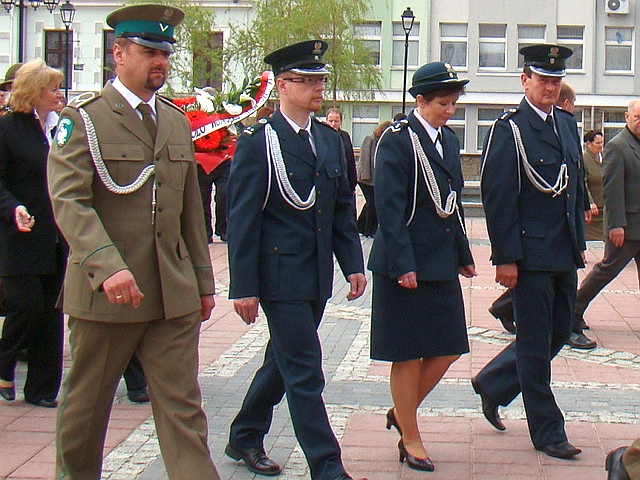
Member of the Polish Border Guard (left) walk alongside law enforcement colleagues from the Polish Customs Service.

Law enforcement agencies in Poland include:

- Policja (police)
- Straż Graniczna (SG) (border guard), also have coast guard department.
- Agencja Bezpieczeństwa Wewnętrznego (ABW) – counterintelligence agency for internal security tasks
- Żandarmeria Wojskowa (ŻW) (military police, military provost)
- Centralne Biuro Antykorupcyjne (CBA) – law enforcement agency designed to fight against corruption
- Prokuratura – Polish public prosecutor office (chief section of the Prokuratura is Prokuratura Generalna)
- Służba Celna – Poland's customs
- Straż miejska City Guard

=== Portugal ===
There are three main police forces in Portugal:

1. Polícia de Segurança Pública (PSP – Public Security Police) – a civil uniformed police, responsible mainly for the policing in the large urban areas;
2. Guarda Nacional Republicana (GNR – Republican National Guard) – a gendarmerie type force, that works mainly in the countryside and small towns;
3. Polícia Judiciária (PJ – Judiciary Police) – responsible for the major criminal investigations.

There are also other smaller specialized police services, like the Autoridade de Segurança Alimentar e Económica (ASAE – Food and Economic Safety Authority), the Polícia Marítima (Maritime Police), the Serviço de Estrangeiros e Fronteiras (SEF – Foreign and Border Service) and the polícias municipais (municipal police).

=== Qatar ===
The Ministry of Interior oversees the various law enforcement units. The Rescue Police Department, or Al-Fazaa, is responsible for most civilian policing. The Juvenile Police Department is responsible for investigating juvenile crime. The Airport Security Department oversees entry and exit from Qatar. Internal security, espionage, and sedition cases are handled by Qatar State Security.

=== Romania ===
General Inspectorate of Romanian Police is the central unit of police in Romania, which manages, guides, supports and controls the activity of the Romanian police units, investigates and analyses very serious crimes related to organized crime, economic, financial or banking criminality, or to other crimes which make the object of the criminal cases investigated by the Prosecutor's Office attached to the High Court of Cassation and Justice, and which has any other attributions assigned by law.

The organizational chart of General Inspectorate of Romanian Police includes general directorates, directorates, services and, offices established by the order of the Minister of Administration and Interior.

The General Inspectorate is under the command of a General Inspector appointed by the Minister of Administration and Interior. Since March 2015, the General Inspector of the Police is appointed by the Prime Minister and also holds the rank of Secretary of State.

=== Russia ===
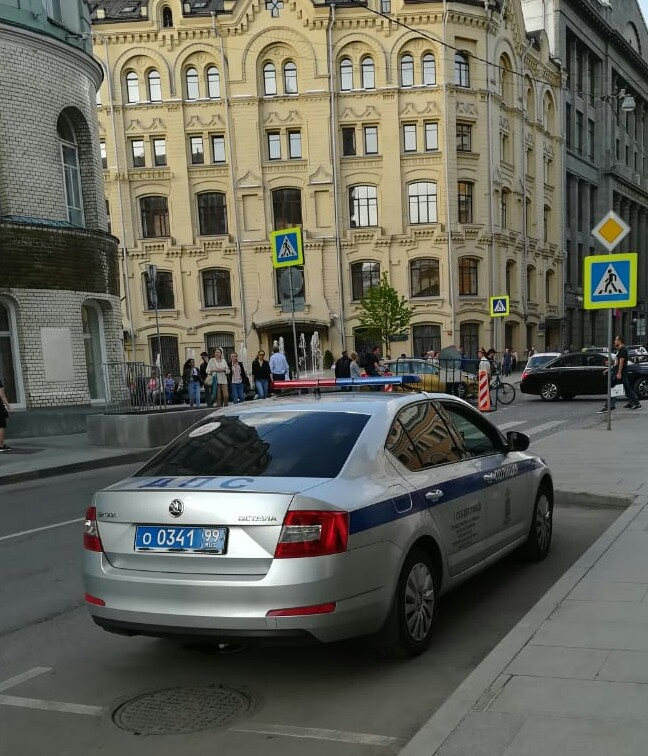
Russian police vehicle in Moscow.

The Police of Russia are called полиция (Politsiya). All police forces are overseen by the Ministry of Internal Affairs, and currently the police is under wide reform. Until 2011 the police was called милиция (Militsiya). This change of name started at the Russian Revolution via a Communist political idea of "replacing the capitalist police by a people's militia"; but the name "militsiya" has persisted after the Communist system collapsed. Numerous cities in Russia have municipal police services and the Oblasts and Krais maintain regional police services. The Republics also have their own police forces. Russia's federal law enforcement agencies are the Federal Security Service and Federal Drug Control Service.

The standard Russian police baton is made of rubber. The normal service uniform is black with red piping and hat band. Fur hats and heavy greatcoats are worn in winter.

=== Rwanda ===
The Rwanda National Police is responsible for law enforcement in Rwanda. It is divided into the northern, southern, eastern, and western regional commands and has numerous specialized units such as the Special Intervention Force, Canine Unit, Special Airport Police Unit, Revenue Protection Unit, and Police Marine Unit.

=== Saudi Arabia ===
Regular policing activities are the responsibility of the Department of Public Safety, the highly centralized national police force. Domestic security and counterintelligence is handled by the Mabahith, or secret police.

=== Serbia ===
The Police of Serbia is responsible for all local and national law enforcement services in Serbia. It is overseen by the Ministry of Internal Affairs.

=== Singapore ===
The Singapore Police Force (SPF) is the main agency tasked with maintaining law and order in the city-state. Formerly known as the Republic of Singapore Police. It is composed of full-time professional police officers who make up about 20% of the force, conscripts doing National Service, and volunteers of the Volunteer Special Constabulary.

=== Slovenia ===
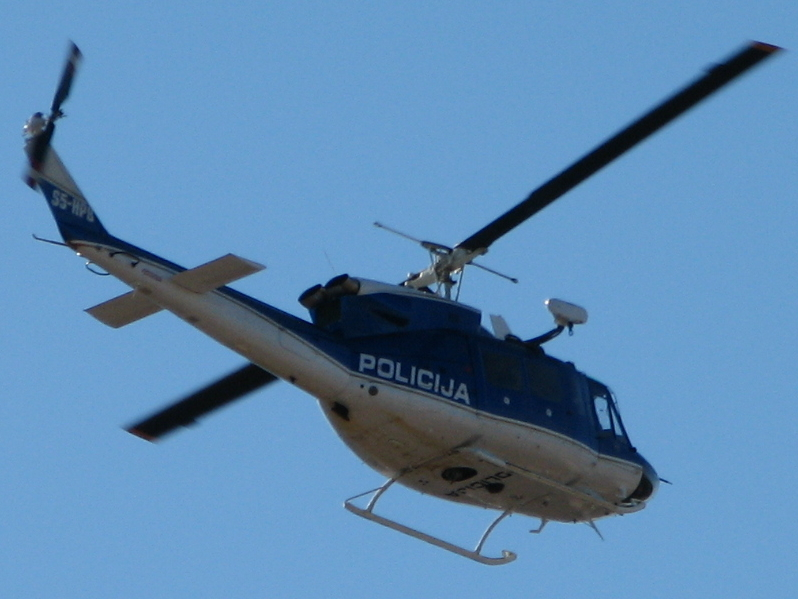
A police helicopter used by the Slovenian National Police.

Law enforcement in Slovenia is the responsibility of the Slovenian National Police force, which is composed of 11 police directorates.

=== Slovakia ===
The Slovak Police Force is the responsible for law enforcement in Slovakia.

=== Somalia ===
The Somali Police Force is the main civil law enforcement agency of Somalia. Law enforcement in the autonomous region of Puntland is provided by the Puntland Police Force, a subdivision of the Puntland Security Force.

=== South Africa ===
The South African Police Service is responsible for providing policing services to the public of South Africa at 1154 police stations, divided across nine provinces.

=== South Korea ===
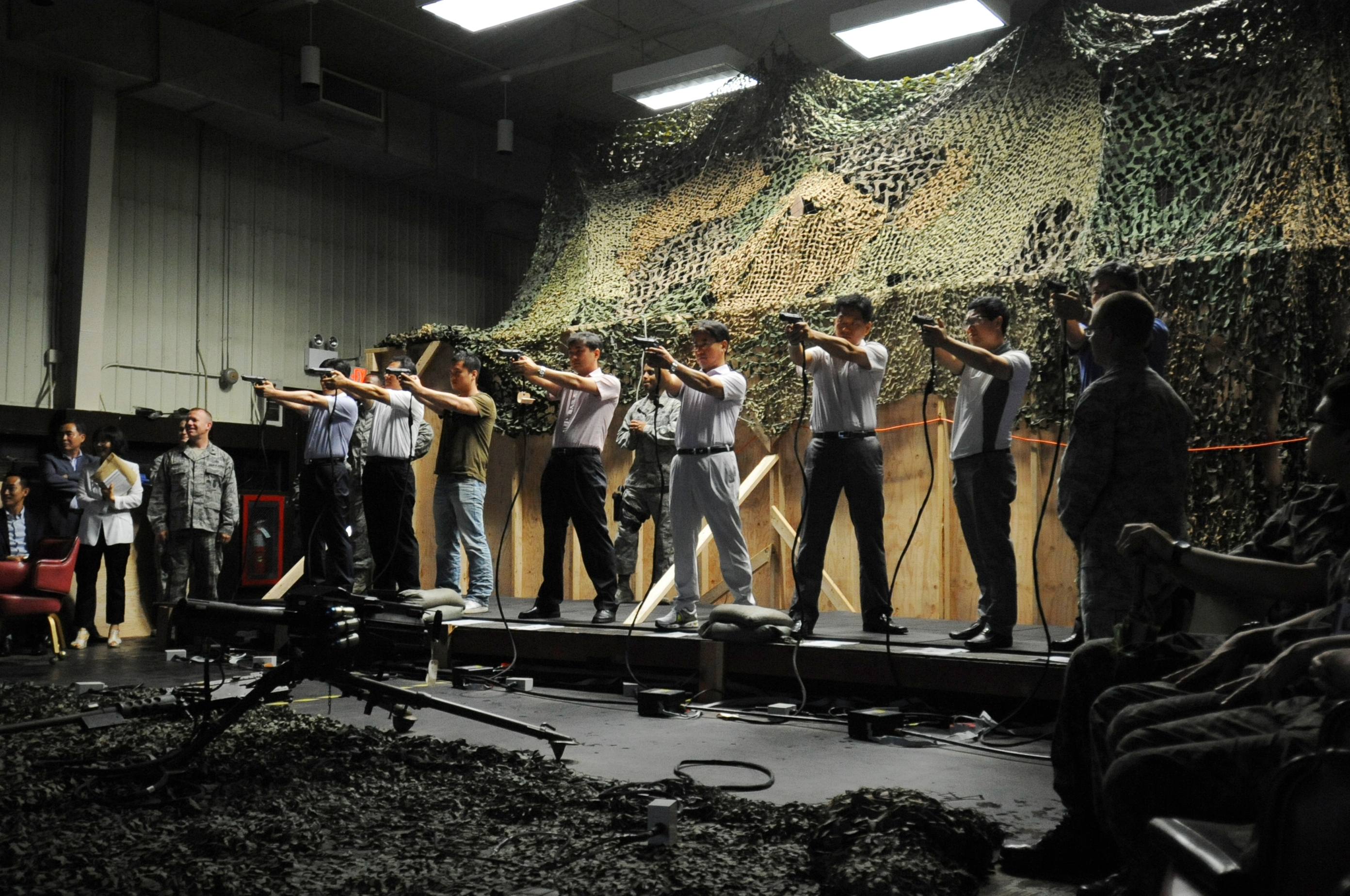
Members of the South Korean National Police Agency undergoing weapons training.

The National Police Agency, or NPA, is the only police organization in South Korea and is run under the Ministry of the Interior and Safety. As a national police force it provides all policing services throughout the country. This differs from the situation in many countries including France, where policing is split between the National Police and Gendarmerie, and between countries such as the United States which have a layered system of National, State/Regional and/or local Law Enforcement organizations.

The NPA is headquartered in Seoul and is divided into 14 local police agencies, including the Seoul Metropolitan Police Agency. Local police agencies are not independent of the national police. There were 96,000 police officers as of 2004

=== Spain ===
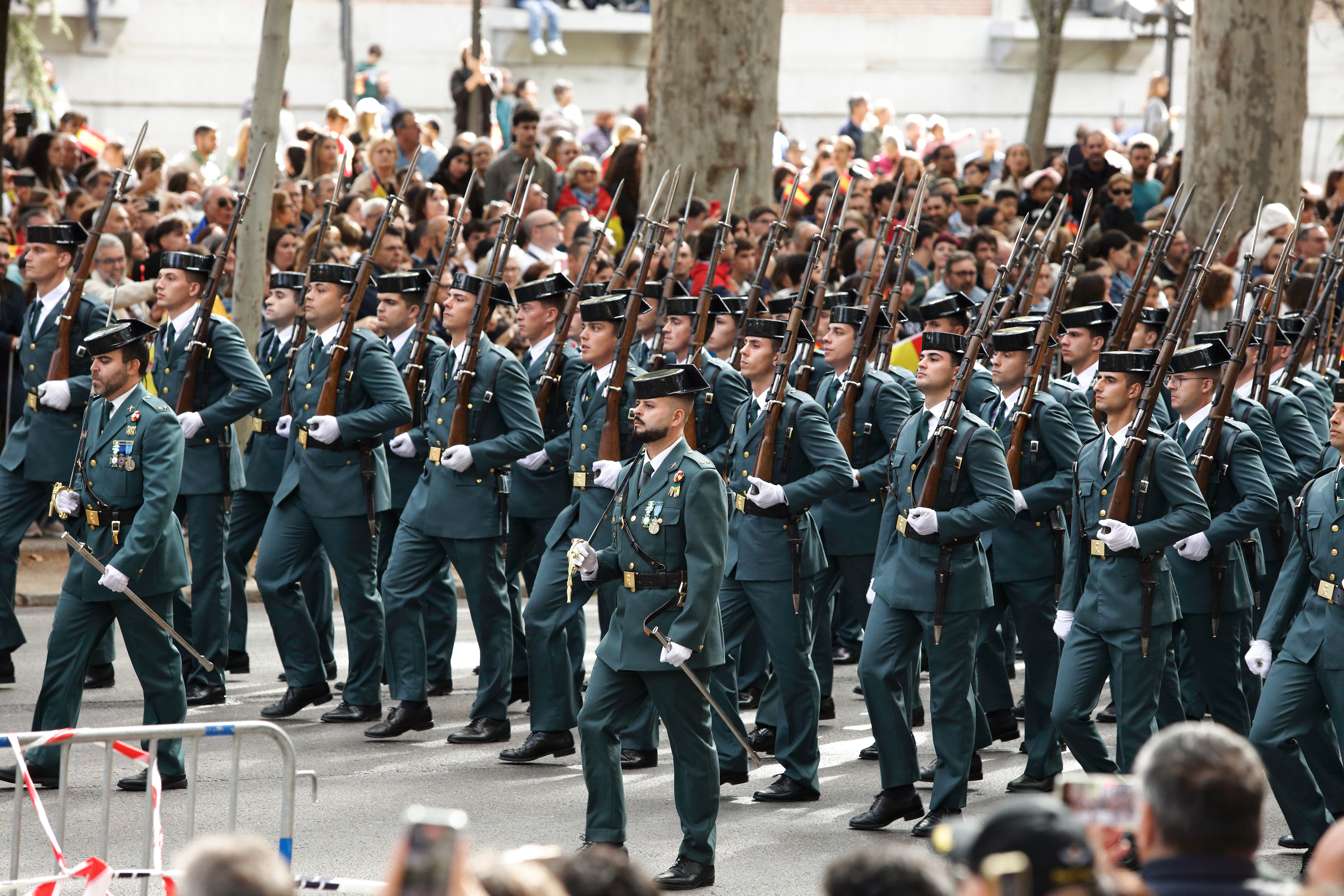
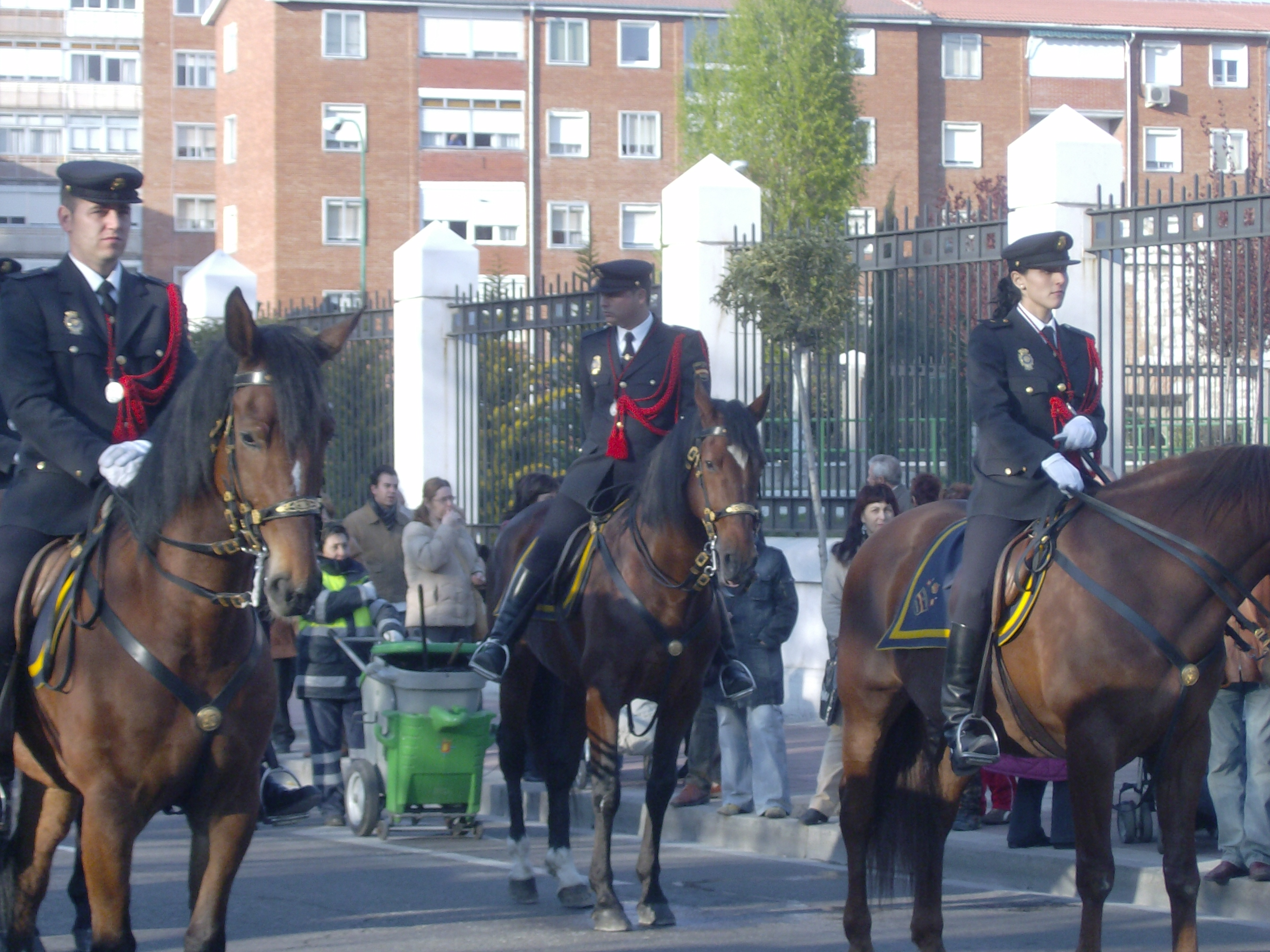
Two Official National Polices of Spain (Civil Guard, in left) and (National Police Corps of Spain, in right)

Policing in Spain is carried out by a combination of national, regional and local bodies:

- The Civil Guard patrols rural areas as well as highways and ports and investigates crimes there. It is a gendarmerie force and has military status. Civil Guard personnel operate from garrison posts that are called casas cuartel ("home-garrisons") which are both minor residential garrisons and fully equipped Police stations. It answers to both the Ministry of Interior and the Ministry of Defence.
- The National Police Corps is the national civilian police force of Spain. It has a civilian status and deals with criminal offences and public order in urban areas. It includes special anti-riot units. It answers to the Ministry of Interior.
- The municipal police operate in most cities and important towns, concentrating on preventing crime, settling minor incidents, traffic control, and, intelligence gathering. These forces answer to the local governments.
- In some Autonomous Communities there is an autonomous police force, under the rule of the regional government, which carries out the duties of the Civil Guard and the National Police. These police forces are the Mossos d'Esquadra in Catalonia, the Ertzaintza in the Basque Country, and the Chartered Police in Navarre. They answer to their respective autonomous governments. The Basque province of Alava retains Spain's oldest police force, the Miñones ("Minions") founded in 1793. Although now an integral division of the Basque Ertzaintza, it answers to the provincial government of Alava.
- Additionally, there is a "special administrative police" which is not under the Ministry of the Interior nor the Ministry of Defence, but the Ministry of the Treasury. The Customs Surveillance Service is responsible for the investigation and prosecution of cases involving contraband, illegal drugs, financial evasion and violations, money laundering, surveillance for financial police purposes and the provision of judicial police services. Despite their civilian status, the officers are trained by both the National Police and the Navy Marines.

=== Sri Lanka ===
The national police service in Sri Lanka is the Sri Lanka Police. The police maintains an elite paramilitary commando force, the Special Task Force, which has taken security duties around the island. Other agencies which have limited police powers are Sri Lanka Customs, the Sri Lanka Coast Guard, and the Commission to Investigate Allegations of Bribery or Corruption. The military has police powers limited to military personnel, mainly for internal investigation and guarding military facilities.

=== Sudan ===
Sudan's main national law enforcement agency is the United Police Forces, responsible for responsible for civil defense, criminal investigations, immigration and customs, passport control, traffic control, and wildlife protection. Police divisions operate within state commands, and state police commissioners report directly to the Director-General of the Police, who answers to the Minister of Interior.

=== Sweden ===
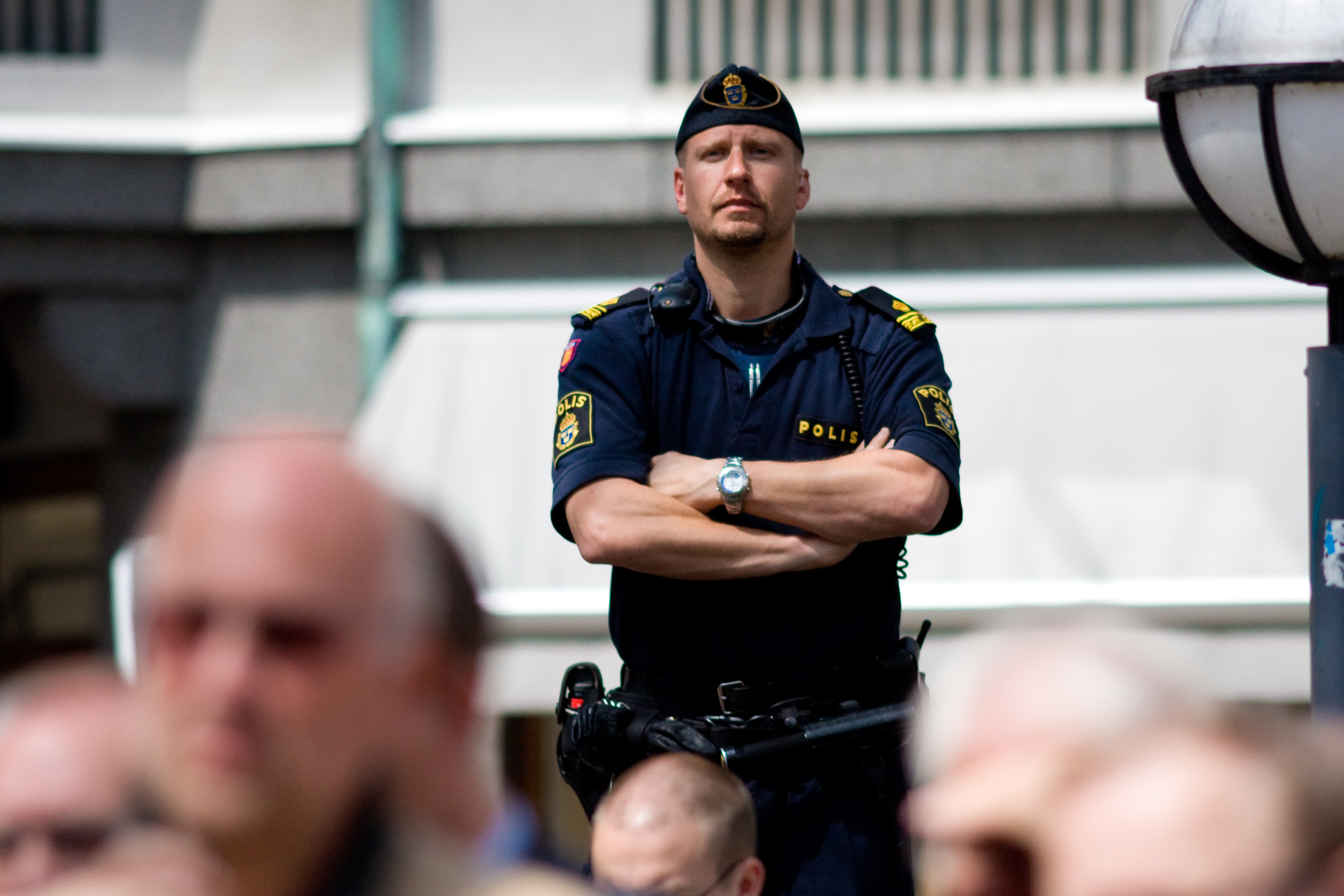
A Swedish Police Authority officer in Helsingborg.

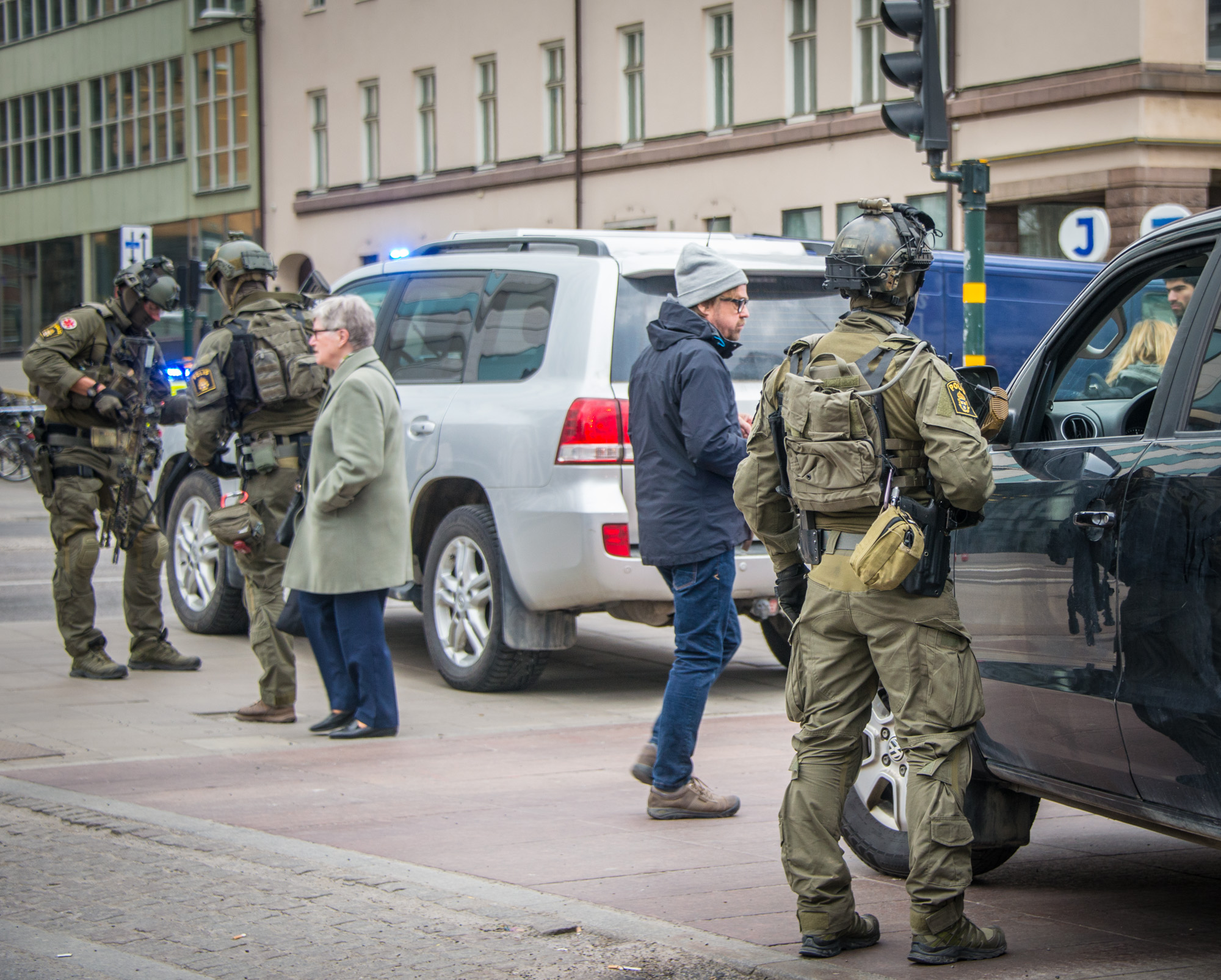
Members of the Swedish Police Authority's National Task Force.

The Swedish Police Authority (in Swedish: Polismyndigheten, but is usually referred to as Polisen) is the central administrative authority responsible for the Swedish police that operates under the Ministry of Justice. The Swedish Police Authority replaced the National Police Board in 2015. Due to the 2015 reform of the police, the Swedish Security Service became a separate entity under the Ministry of Justice, instead of previously being part of the National Police Board. The reform also resulted in Rikskriminalpolisen (National Criminal Investigations Department) being dissolved and its duties transferred to the National Operations Department. The 21 police regions that were established according to the Counties of Sweden prior to the reform were replaced by six police regions, which were instead divided into 27 local police districts.

Swedish police officers are always armed with a 9 mm Sig Sauer handgun, a telescopic baton and a can of pepper spray.

The Swedish Police Authority maintains three well-trained SWAT elements, the first being the elite counter-terrorism National Task Force which is the equivalent of Germany's GSG 9 and the French GIGN. The second unit being the Reinforced Regional Task Force (previously known as Piketen), which is trained to handle riot control, hostage situations and high-risk arrests in three of Sweden's major cities; Stockholm, Gothenburg and Malmö. The third element is composed of small, less well-equipped special response units under the jurisdictions of their respective local police districts, they are simply called Regional Task Forces, and they serve officially under the Reinforced Regional Task Force.

=== Switzerland ===
The police in Switzerland is mainly the responsibility of the 26 cantons, each of which operates a cantonal police service. Some municipalities have their own municipal police departments as well, but most of them are responsible for general law and order and parking enforcement only while in some larger cities they carry out traffic control as well. Only the cities of Zürich, Winterthur, and Lausanne have municipal police departments which provide a full policing service. The Swiss federal government operates the Federal Office of Police, which coordinates between cantonal police forces. It maintains an investigative arm, the Federal Criminal Police, which includes the Task Force TIGRIS tactical unit. The Swiss military also operates a military police force.

=== Syria ===
The General Security Service is the national police service and internal security force of Syria and is run under the Ministry of Interior. It is charged with maintaining law and order, protecting life and property and investigating crimes.

=== Taiwan (Republic of China) ===
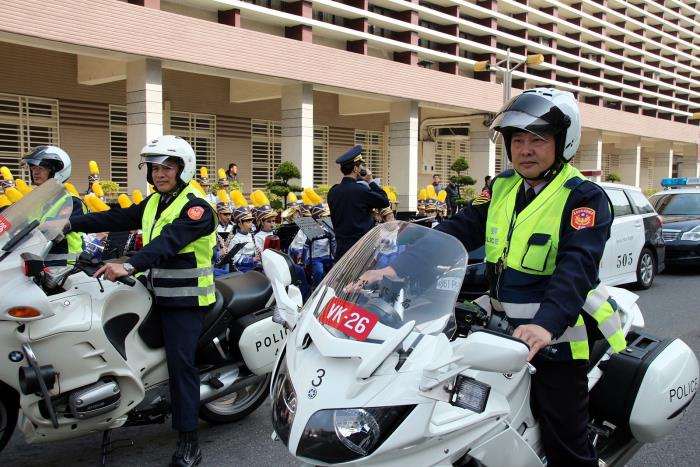
Officers from Chiayi Police on police motorcycles.

The Taiwanese police is a national police force. It has an elite Special Forces unit known as the Thunder Squad. It is trained for dealing with dangerous and high-risk missions, as well as counter-terrorism due to the potential military threat from the People's Republic of China.

=== Tanzania ===
The Tanzania Police Force is the national police force of Tanzania, responsible for civilian law enforcement. It is run by the Ministry of Home Affairs. The force is divided into five departments, each headed by a commissioner.

=== Thailand ===
The Royal Thai Police is the national police force of Thailand. It is subdivided into several regions and services, each enjoying their own powers.

- Crime Suppression Division, Thai FBI
- Immigration
- Traffic police

=== Tunisia ===
The Tunisian National Police, which is overseen by the Ministry of Interior, is mainly responsible for law enforcement tasks. The Judicial Police is responsible for criminal investigations. The Tunisian National Guard and Presidential Guard help provide internal security.

=== Turkey ===
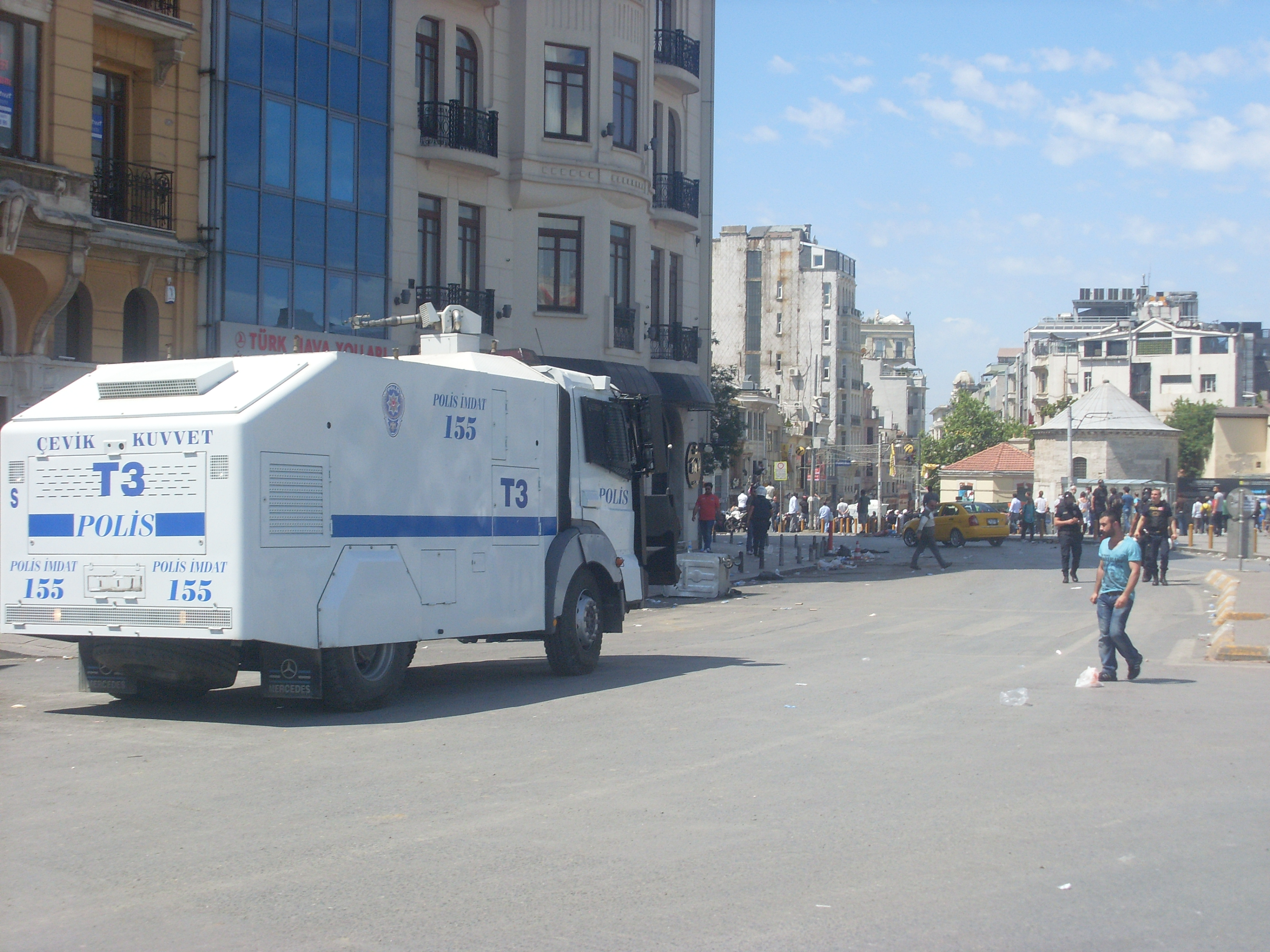
A Turkish National Police water cannon during the Gezi Park protests.

Law enforcement is Turkey is carried out by five separate bodies. The Turkish National Police (Turkish: Polis) is the civilian police for towns and districts, under the Ministry of Internal Affairs. The Gendarmerie (Turkish: Jandarma) is a branch of the Ministry of Foreign Affairs responsible only for policing the civilian population in areas that fall outside the jurisdiction of the National Police, mainly rural areas. Provost services are provided by the Military Police (Turkish: Askeri inzibat). The Turkish Coast Guard (Turkish: Sahil Güvenlik Komutanlığı) is also a branch of the Armed Forces, responsible for search and rescue and maritime border protection. The National Intelligence Organization (Turkish: Millî İstihbarat Teşkilâtı) is responsible for internal security. Some limited local law enforcement is carried out by village guards.

=== Uganda ===
The Uganda National Police is the sole civilian law enforcement agency of Uganda.

=== Ukraine ===
The National Police of Ukraine is the sole civilian police service of Ukraine. It is operated by the Ministry of Internal Affairs, which also manages other agencies with specialized law enforcement duties, such as the Border Guard Service. Under the authority of the same ministry, the country also has a gendarmerie, the National Guard of Ukraine. In addition to its public order function, during wartime the National Guard can be mobilized as a regular military force and take part in combat operations alongside the Armed Forces of Ukraine.

There are also other independent agencies with investigative powers, especially in corruption affairs involving high government officers, such as the National Anti-Corruption Bureau of Ukraine and the State Bureau of Investigation.

=== United Arab Emirates ===
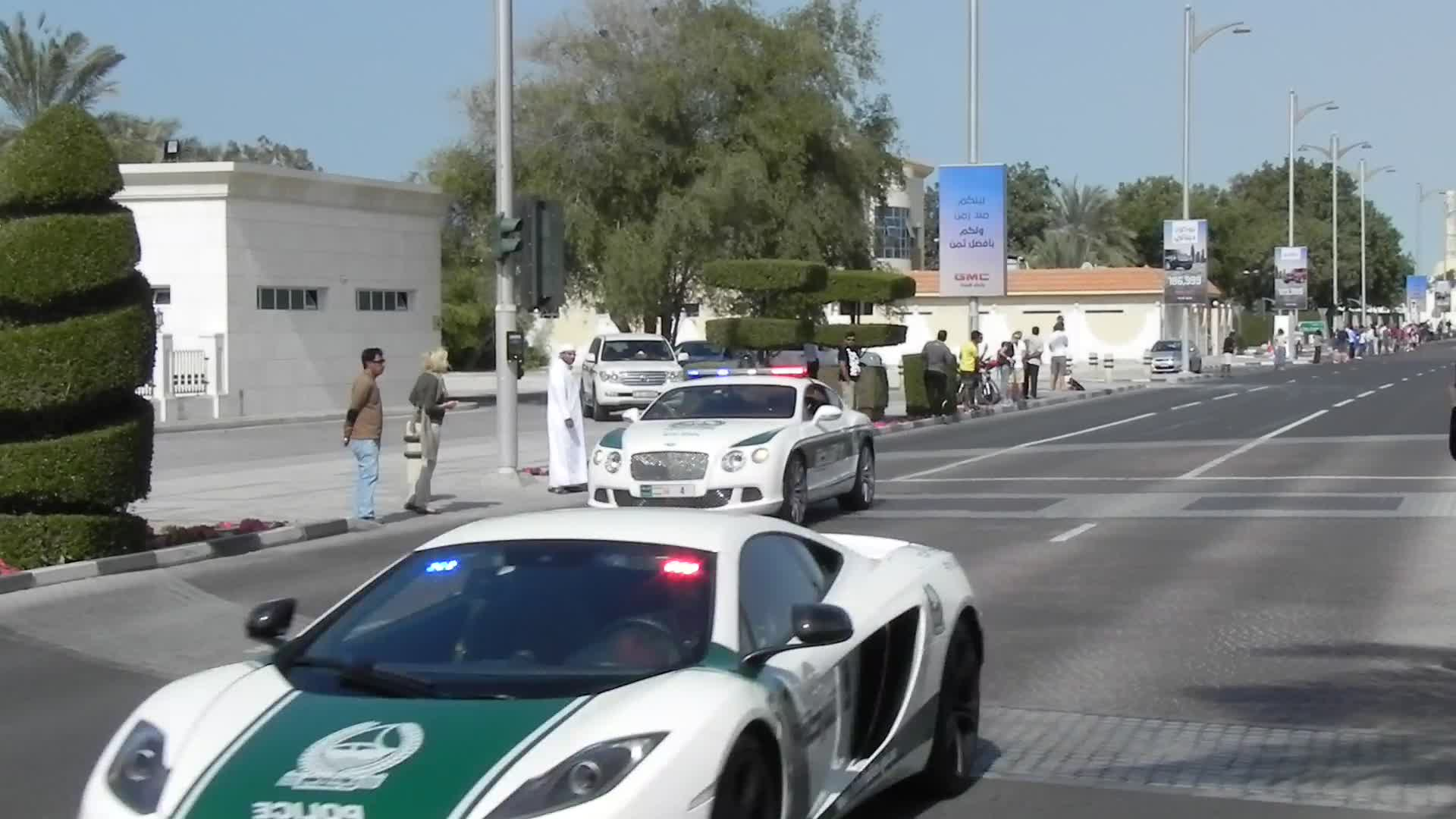
Two supercars operated by the Dubai Police Force of the United Arab Emirates.

Law enforcement in the United Arab Emirates is divided regionally with each Emirate having its own independent police force. For example, the Abu Dhabi Police has jurisdiction within the Emirate of Abu Dhabi and the Dubai Police Force has jurisdiction within the Emirate of Dubai.

=== United Kingdom ===
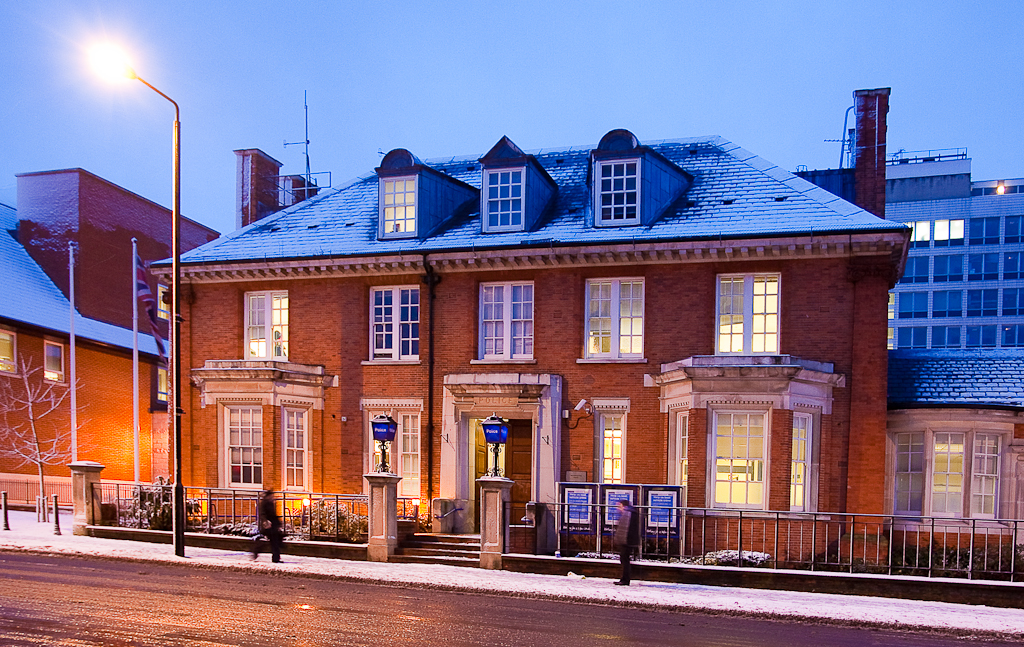
A police station in South London, with the traditional blue lamps.

Widely regarded as the home of the first modern police force, law enforcement in the United Kingdom is based on the long-standing philosophy of policing by consent. Policing and law enforcement are organised separately in each of the legal systems of the United Kingdom as a result of devolution of powers to Scotland, Northern Ireland and, to a lesser extent, London.

England and Wales have 43 local police forces (formerly known as constabularies), each of which covers a 'police area' (a particular county, grouping of counties or metropolitan area). Since 2012, 41 of these forces have their own directly elected Police and Crime Commissioner, under the Police Reform and Social Responsibility Act 2011. The two exceptions are in London, where the Metropolitan Police is accountable to the directly elected mayor via the Office for Policing and Crime, and the much smaller City of London Police that retains the Common Council of the City as its police authority.

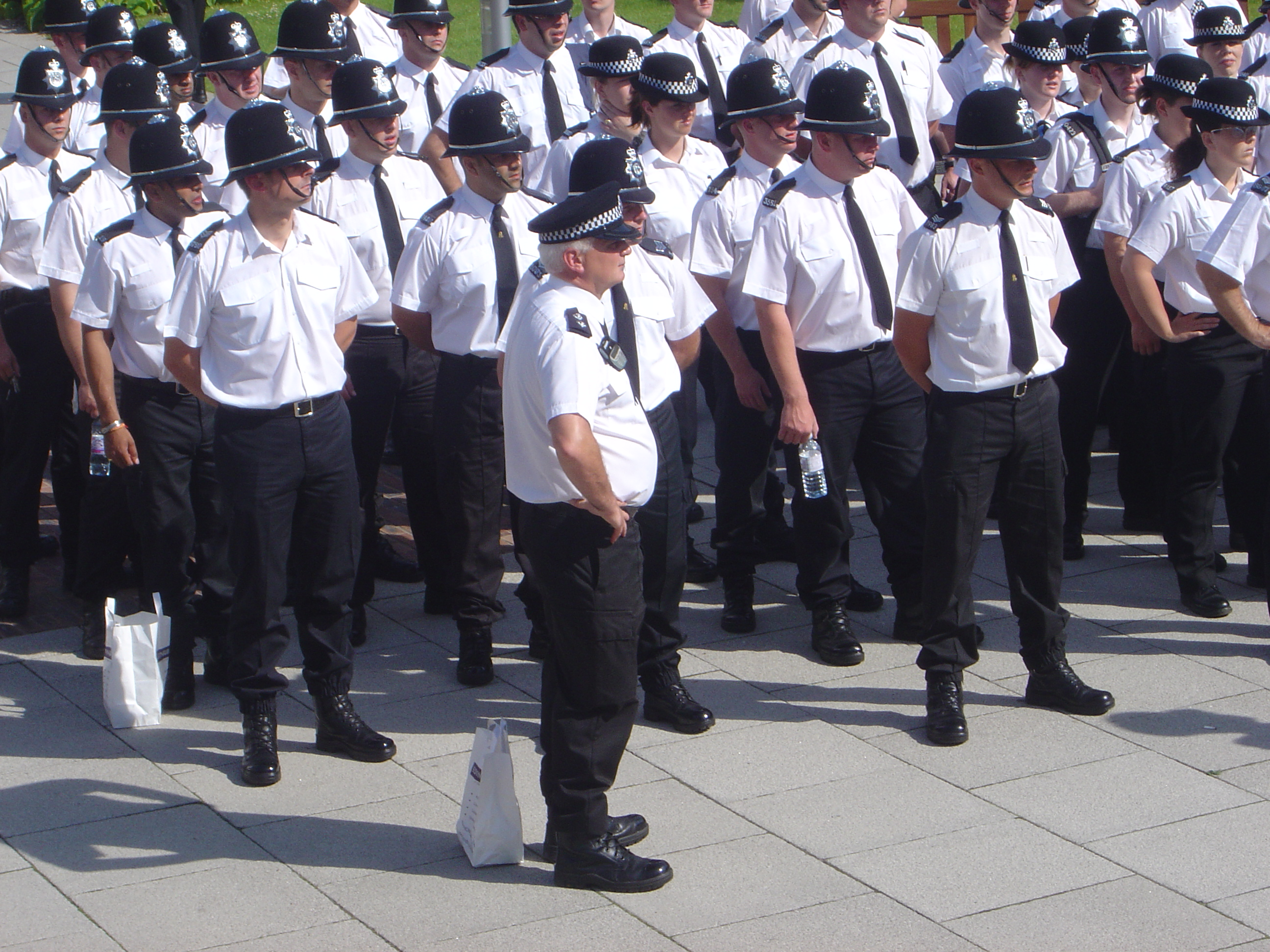
Police Scotland officers without firearms. Most British law enforcement officers do not carry a firearm.

Scotland now has a single national force – the Police Service of Scotland (Scottish Gaelic: Seirbheis Phoilis na h-Alba), commonly known as Police Scotland. It replaced eight former territorial police forces and the Scottish Crime and Drug Enforcement Agency in April 2013 and is overseen by the Scottish Police Authority, under the terms of the Police and Fire Reform (Scotland) Act 2012.

The Police Service of Northern Ireland (Irish: Seirbhís Póilíneachta Thuaisceart Éireann, Ulster Scots: Polis Servis o Norlin Airlan) serves Northern Ireland, succeeding the Royal Ulster Constabulary (RUC) in 2001. Following the Police (Northern Ireland) Act 2000, the PSNI is supervised by the Northern Ireland Policing Board (Irish: Bord Póilíneachta Thuaisceart Éireann, Ulster-Scots: Norlin Airlan Polisin Boord), who are themselves appointed since 2007 by the Minister of Justice (Northern Ireland) using the Nolan principles for public appointments.

From October 2013 the National Crime Agency (NCA) operates as the United Kingdom's first national law enforcement agency. Replacing the existing Serious Organised Crime Agency and Child Exploitation and Online Protection Centre, as well as assuming some of the responsibilities of the UK Border Agency, but not counter-terrorism, for the first time it will have authority for "tasking and coordination" investigative work to local forces under the Crime and Courts Act 2013.

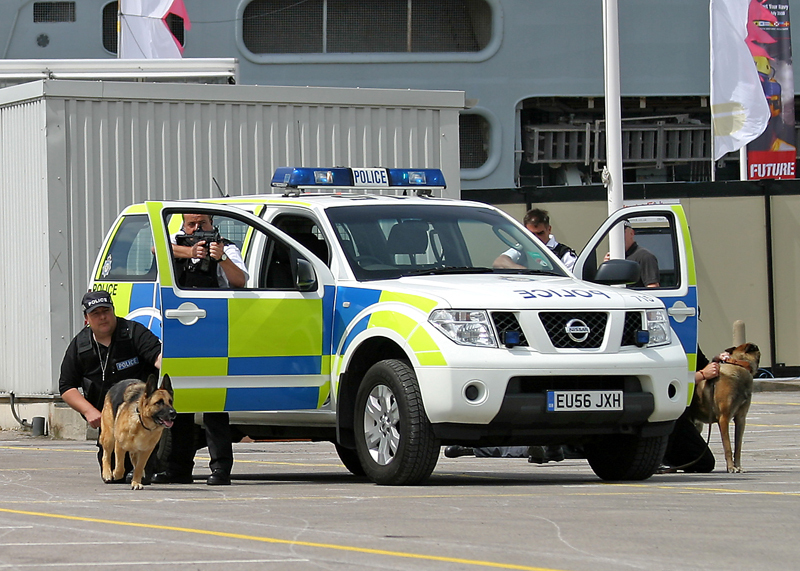
The Ministry of Defence Police is one of three special police forces that have a specific, non-regional jurisdiction of enforcement.

There are also three special police forces that have a specific, non-regional jurisdiction – the British Transport Police, Civil Nuclear Constabulary, Ministry of Defence Police. Over the centuries there has been a wide variation in the number of police forces operating within the UK, most of which now no longer exist, see list of former police forces in the United Kingdom. A few miscellaneous constabularies with responsibility mostly founded on old legislation to police specific local areas, such as ports and parks, have escaped police reform. Lastly, a number of government bodies that are not police forces have detective powers and enforce laws, such as the Marine and Fisheries Agency and UK Border Agency, who employ officers with limited powers of detention and search but generally cannot make full arrests.

The majority of British police are never routinely armed with firearms, relying on an extendable baton and in some cases Tasers, with specialist armed units always on patrol and called in only when necessary. The exceptions are the Ministry of Defence Police, the Civil Nuclear Constabulary and the Police Service of Northern Ireland which are routinely armed.

Uniquely in Britain, there are police forces of Crown Dependencies such as the Isle of Man and States of Jersey and Guernsey, who have police forces that share resources with the UK police, whilst having a separate administration within their own governments. The British Overseas Territories, have their own police forces which are generally based on the British model of policing.

The British Armed Forces also maintain military police units: the Royal Military Police, Royal Air Force Police, Royal Navy Police, and Royal Marines Police. Military police personnel are not constables under UK law and only have police powers in relation to service personnel.

=== United States ===
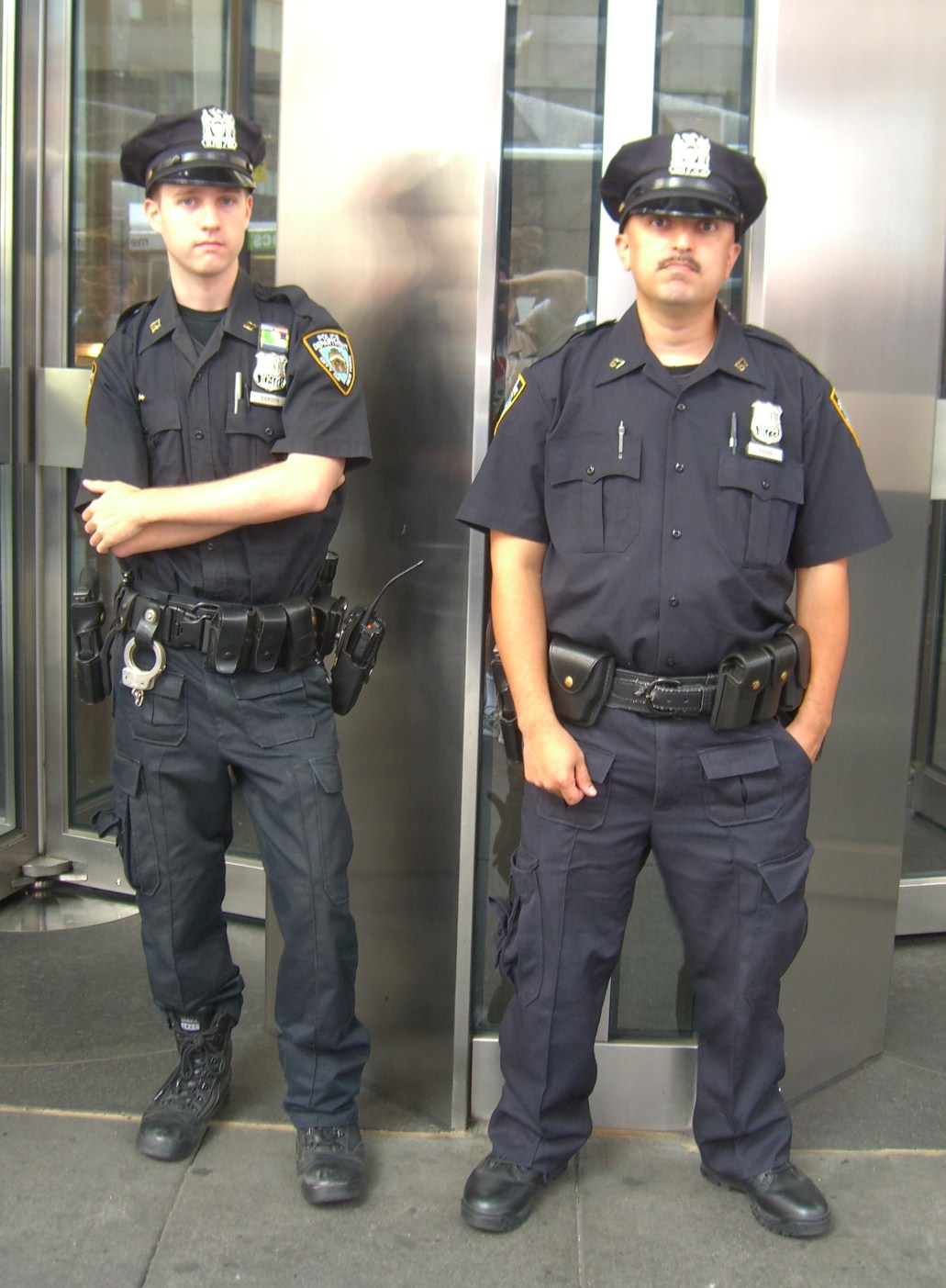
Two NYPD officers in Times Square, New York in 2010.

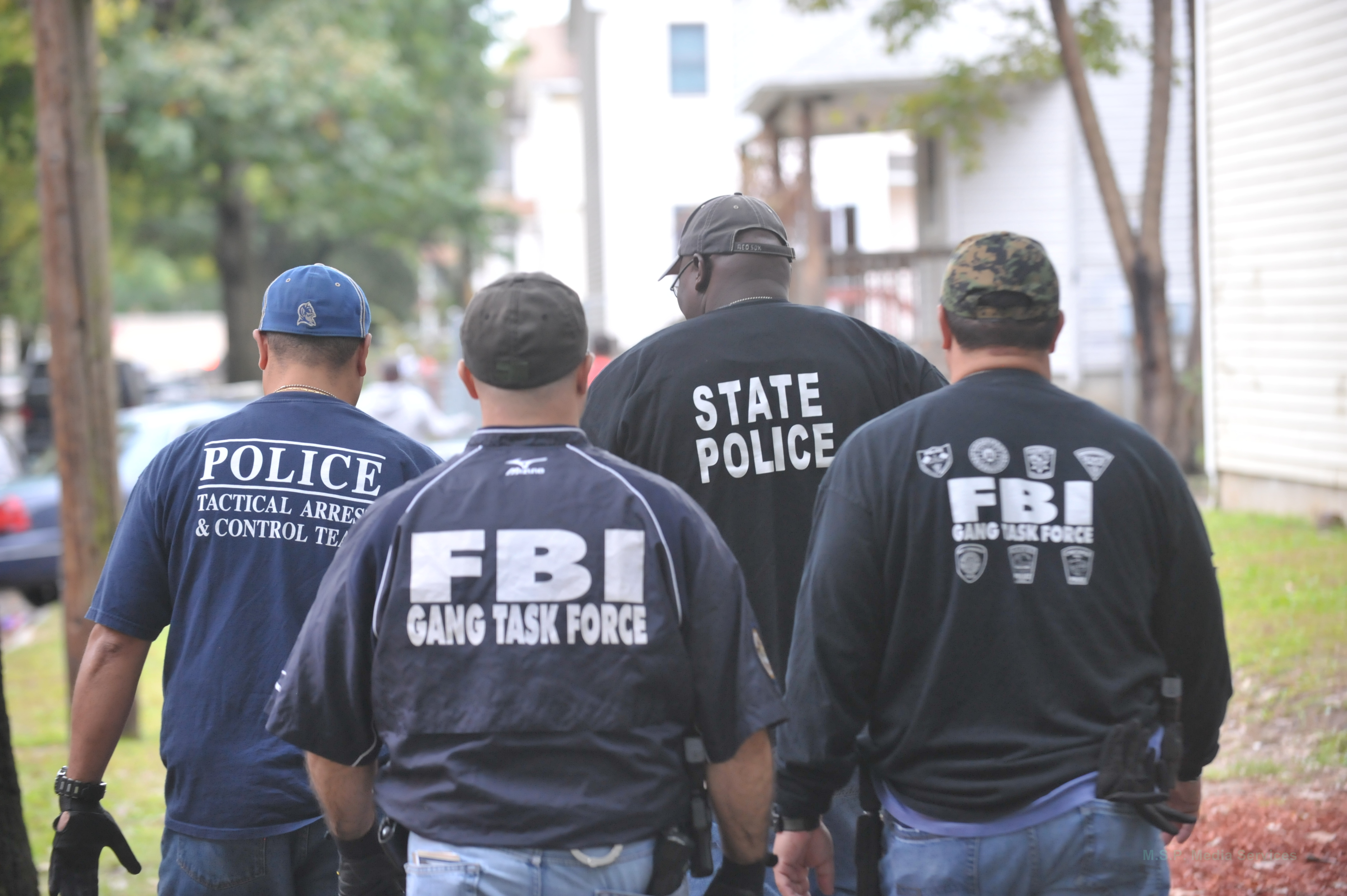
American officers from municipal, state, and federal law enforcement services.

In the United States, the Federal Bureau of Investigation (FBI) and other federal police agencies such as the Bureau of Alcohol, Tobacco, Firearms and Explosives, Drug Enforcement Administration, U.S. Immigration and Customs Enforcement, United States Secret Service, United States Marshals Service, United States Park Police, United States Capitol Police, United States Mint Police, United States Postal Inspection Service, and the United States Pentagon Police are limited to the enforcement of federal laws and usually specialize in certain crimes or duties, but do enforce some state laws. Most crimes constitutionally fall under the jurisdiction of state police or the thousands of local police forces. These include county police departments and sheriff's offices as well as municipal or city police departments. Many areas also have special agencies such as campus police, railroad police, airport police, transit police, tribal police, housing police, or a district or precinct constable. All states except Hawaii maintain state police agencies. Most counties have sheriff's offices led by a sheriff who is elected by the people of the county to the position, though some have county police forces which are not led by an elected official, and others have both a sheriff's office and county police department. Most cities and many towns maintain their own police departments, including even small towns with police departments consisting of a few officers. In addition, most state universities maintain their own police departments, as do many airports and seaports. The United States Armed Forces maintain numerous military police agencies. There are approximately 18,000 federal, state, county, and local law enforcement agencies in the United States, most of them municipal police departments.

=== Uruguay ===
The National Police of Uruguay is responsible for maintaining law and order. It is overseen by the Ministry of the Interior.

=== Venezuela ===
The Bolivarian National Police (Venezuelan National Police) is responsible for law enforcement duties in national jurisdiction. Likewise, there are state police bodies in charge of the autonomy of each state and its state constitution; some examples are the Autonomous Police Institute of the State of Miranda, or the Bolivarian Police Force of the State of Zulia. In addition to these, there is also the Scientific, Penal, and Criminal Investigation Service Corps and the Bailiff Corps (Spanish: Cuerpo de Alguacilazgo), the latter serves the Venezuelan judiciary and performs police duties in the courts, with powers similar to that of the United States Marshals Service.

=== Vietnam ===
The single law enforcement agency in Vietnam is the Vietnam People's Public Security, which answers to the Ministry of Public Security.

=== Zambia ===
The Zambia Police Service is the single civilian law enforcement agency of Zambia. It is under the portfolio of the Ministry of Home Affairs.

=== Zimbabwe ===
The Zimbabwe Republic Police is the national police service of Zimbabwe. It has various specialized units such as the Duty Uniformed Branch (DUB), Criminal Investigation Department (CID), National Traffic Branch, Police Protection Unit(PPU) and Support Unit also known as riot police or Gondo harishayi.

== See also ==
- List of basic law enforcement topics
- List of law enforcement agencies
