= Azizollah Rajabzadeh =

Iranian brigadier general

Sardar Azizollah Rajabzadeh
- عزیزالله رجب‌زاده
- Born: 1962 (age 63–64); Tehran، Iran
- Military career
- Allegiance: Iran
- Branch: Committee IRGC
- Service years: 1979–2009
- Rank: Brigadier General
- Commands: Iranian Police Special Units Faraja
- Conflicts: Iran–Iraq War

Azizollah Rajabzadeh (Persian: عزیزالله رجب‌زاده, born 1962) is a Brigadier general of the Police Command of the Islamic Republic of Iran, who previously commanded the Iranian Police Special Units. He was the commander of Police Command of the Islamic Republic of Iran from 2008 to 2009. In March 2009, Mohammad Bagher Ghalibaf appointed Rajabzadeh as the head of the Tehran Crisis Prevention and Management Organization, and he served as the head of that organization until March 2013.

== Kahrizak Incident in 2009 ==
As Commander of the Law Enforcement Forces in Tehran Province, Azizollah Rajabzadeh is the highest ranking accused in the case of abuses in Kahrizak Detention Center.

== E.U Sanctions ==
On 13 April 2011, the European Union published the names of 32 officials of the Islamic Republic of Iran whom the E.U. asserts are responsible for serious human rights violations and is thus subjecting to travel bans and asset freezes.

== See also ==
- Ashura protests

Military offices
Preceded by ?	Commander of Iranian Police Special Units ?–2005	Succeeded by Seyyed Mojtaba Abdullahi
Preceded by Eskandar Momeni	Commander of Iranian Prevention Police; 2005–2008	Succeeded by Alireza Jazini
Preceded by Ahmad-Reza Radan	Commander of Police Command of the Islamic Republic of Iran; 2008–2009	Succeeded by Hossein Sajedinia
Civic offices
Preceded by Maziar Hosseini	Chef of Tehran City Crisis Prevention and Management Organization; 2009–2013	Succeeded by Ahmad Sadeghi
