= Hossein Sajedinia =

Iranian brigadier general (born 1962)

Sardar Hossein Sajedinia
- حسین ساجدی‌نیا
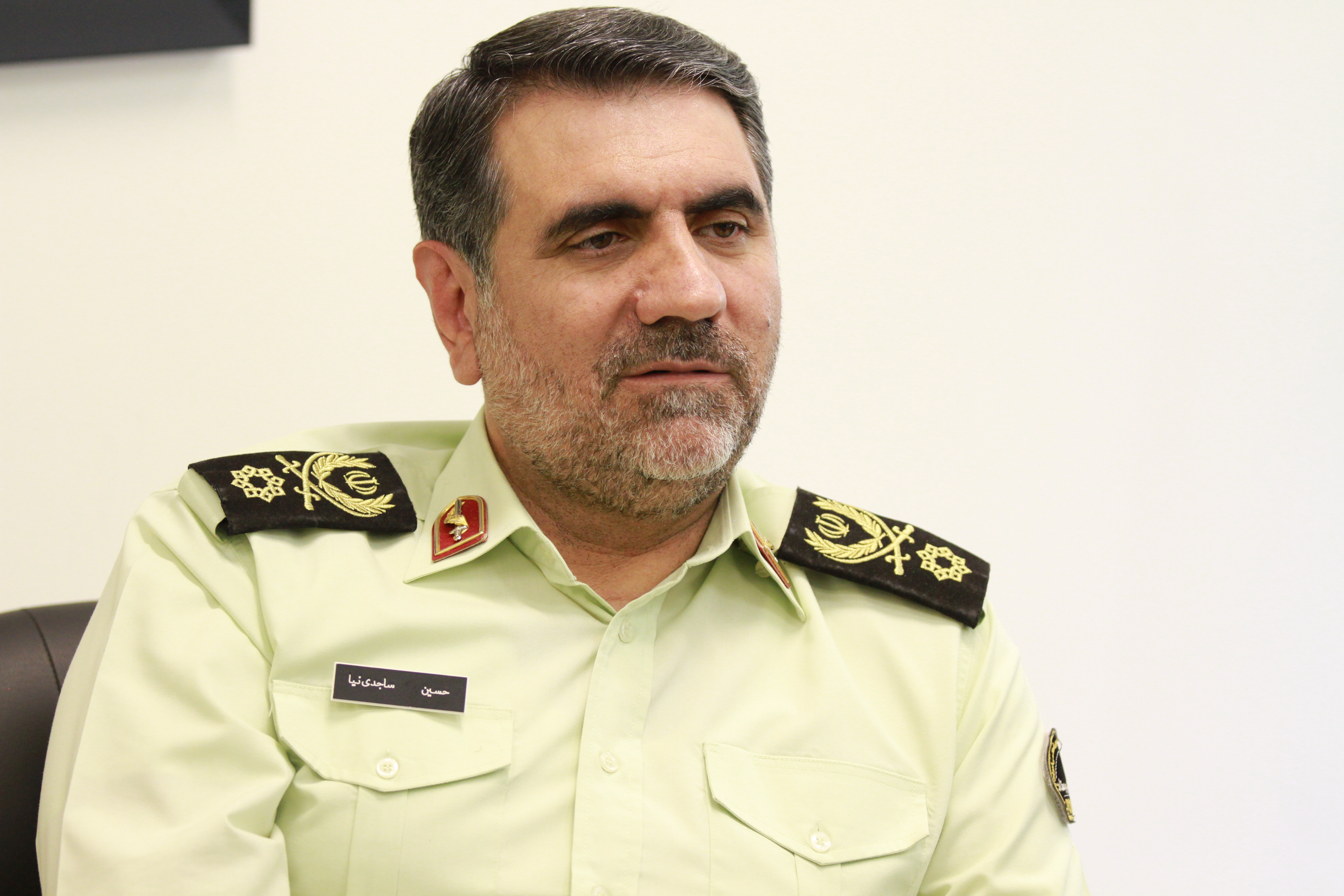
- Born: 1962 (age 63–64); Isfahan، Iran
- Military career
- Allegiance: Iran
- Branch: Committee IRGC
- Rank: Brigadier General
- Commands: Iranian Traffic Police Faraja
- Conflicts: Iran–Iraq War

Hossein Sajedinia (Persian: حسین ساجدی‌نیا, born 1962) is a Brigadier general of the Police Command of the Islamic Republic of Iran, who serves deputy of Ministry of Interior and Head of Iranian Crisis Management Organization since 2024. Sajedinia began his military career with the Islamic Revolution Committees and was a member of the Islamic Revolutionary Guard Corps during the Iran–Iraq War.

Sajedinia was the Chief of the Traffic Police from 2004 to 2006, served as the Deputy chief of Police Command of the Islamic Republic of Iran from 2006 to 2008.

On Thursday, 6 October 2022, the US Treasury Department sanctioned Hossein Sajedinia along with six other senior officials of the Islamic Republic for cutting off access to the internet and for their involvement in the suppression of protests in Iran.

Military offices
Preceded by Hossein Bijani	Commander of Iranian Traffic Police; 2004–2006	Succeeded by Hamidreza Hashemi
Preceded by Nasser Shabani	Deputy chief of Police Command of the Islamic Republic of Iran; 2006–2008	Vacant Title next held by Mohammadreza Alipour
Preceded by Eskandar Momeni	Operations commander of Police Command of the Islamic Republic of Iran; 2009–2009 2017–2024	Succeeded by Qasem Rezaei
Preceded by Seyyed Abolhassan Batoli	Operations commander of Police Command of the Islamic Republic of Iran; 2009–2009 2017–2024	Succeeded by Hassan Karami
Preceded by Azizollah Rajabzadeh	Commander of Police Command of the Islamic Republic of Iran; 2017–2008	Succeeded by Hossein Rahimi
Political offices
Preceded by Mohammad-Hassan Nami	Deputy of Ministry of Interior Head of Iranian Crisis Management Organization; 2024–present	Incumbent
