= Qasem Rezaei =

Iranian brigadier general

Sardar Qasem Rezaei
- قاسم رضایی
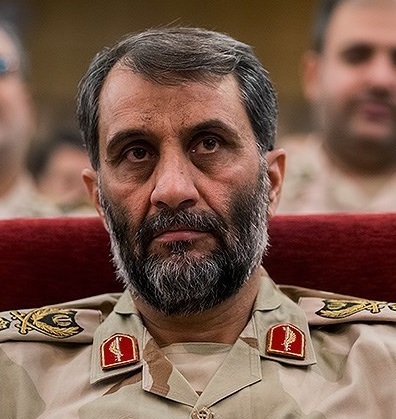
- Born: Abhar, Zanjan, Iran
- Military career
- Allegiance: Iran
- Branch: IRGC FARAJA
- Rank: Brigadier General
- Commands: Border Guard Command
- Conflicts: Iran–Iraq War

Qasem Rezaei (Persian: قاسم رضایی) is a Brigadier general of the Police Command of the Islamic Republic of Iran, who has been serving as the Deputy Commander-in-Chief of Faraja since May 2020.

He was a member of the Islamic Revolutionary Guard Corps during the Iran–Iraq War. Rezaei served as Deputy Chief of Police Operations from 2009 to 2014, and served as Commander of the Border Guard Command from 2014 to 2020.

== Dealing with criminals ==
In January 2020, Rezaei, in his position as deputy commander of the police force, in an interview he gave to an IRNA reporter at the Tehran Police Headquarters, ordered police officers to break the hands and legs of those wielding machetes at the scene of a conflict. In this interview, he emphasized the need to amputate the hands and legs of criminals and said to the officers:

== Sanctions ==
- European Union In January 2023, the European Union sanctioned Rezaei for human rights violations.
- United States In May 2020, the US Treasury Department sanctioned Rezaei for being responsible for serious human rights violations, violence against detainees, including torture and beatings, the use of deadly force against Iranian protesters, and calling for continued violence against protesters, including the use of direct fire against individuals at Iran's borders.

== Awards and honors ==
This section includes Qasem Rezaei's official insignia and awards, which are displayed on him Uniform, but does not include civilian and unofficial awards.

Military offices
Preceded by Hossein Sajedinia	Deputy Chief of Police Operations; 2009–2014	Succeeded by Seyyed Abolhassan Batoli
Preceded by Hossein Zolfaghari	Commander of Border Guard Command; 2014–2020	Succeeded by Ahmadali Goodarzi
Preceded by Ayoub Soleimani	Deputy Commander-in-Chief of Faraja; 2019–2020	Succeeded by Himself
Preceded by Himself	Deputy Commander of Faraja; 2020–present	Incumbent
