= Taghi Mehri =

Iranian Public Conscription Organization Chief

Taghi Mehri Sardar
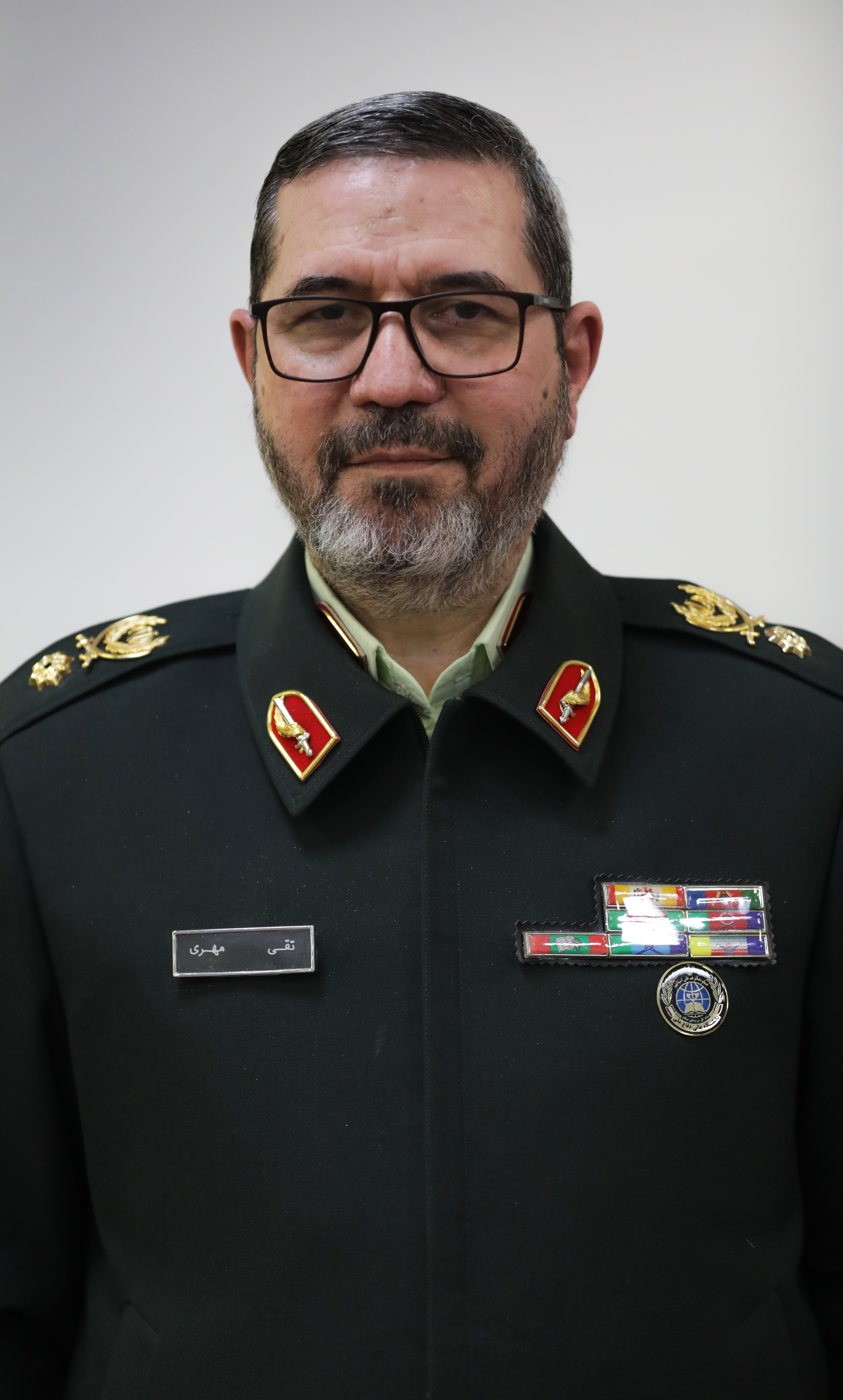
- Born: 1961 (age 64–65); Gorgan, Golestan Province, Iran
- Military career
- Allegiance: Iran
- Branch: Shahrbani; Law Enforcement Force
- Rank: Brigadier general
- Conflicts: Iran-Iraq War

Taghi Mehri (Persian: تقی مهری; born 1961) is a military officer who held office as the head of the Iranian Public Conscription Organization.
