= Hossein Ashtari =

Iranian military officer

Sardar Hossein Ashtari
- حسین اشتری
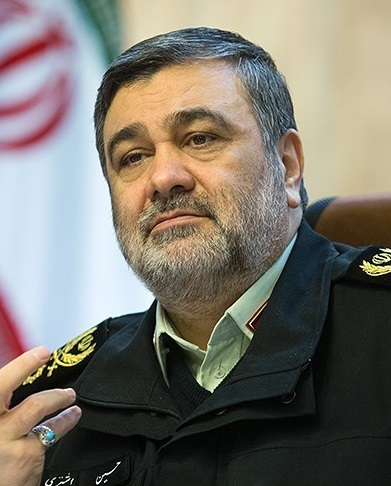
- Born: 1959 (age 66–67); Isfahan, Pahlavi Iran
- Military career
- Allegiance: Iran
- Branch: Revolutionary Guards; Law Enforcement Command
- Rank: Brigadier general
- Conflicts: Iran–Iraq War (WIA); Iran–PJAK conflict; West Iran clashes

Hossein Ashtari (Persian: حسین اشتری) is an Iranian military officer who served as Iran's Chief of police, the chief commander of Police Command of the Islamic Republic of Iran, from 2015 until early 2023.

Prior to the appointment, he was second-in-command of the forces replacing Ahmad-Reza Radan, having previously served as the commander of Intelligence and Security Police until 2014.

Ashtari is a former general of the Islamic Revolutionary Guard Corps.

== Sanctions ==
Hossein Ashtari is among the 13 military and country officials who are responsible for suppressing the protesters of 2019–2020 Iranian protests. On May 20, 2020, the US Treasury Department put Hossein Ashtari on its sanctions list, along with Interior Minister Abdolreza Rahmani Fazli and several other senior officials of the security forces. According to the statement of the Treasury Department of the United States, Hossein Ashtari, as the commander of the police force of the Islamic Republic of Iran, was involved in the killing of "hundreds of protesters" in November 2018.

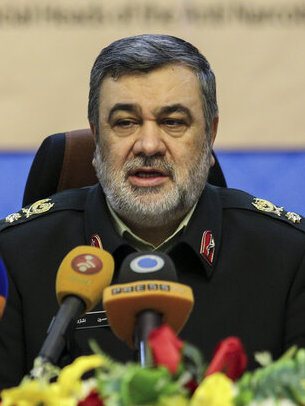
Ashtari, 2020

On April 12, 2021, Hossein Ashtari was sanctioned by the European Union for serious human violations and suppressing the protests of 2019–2020 Iranian protests and was placed on the sanctions list of this union. According to the announcement of this union, his assets in Europe are blocked and he is prohibited from traveling to European countries and receiving visas from these countries.

The UK government sanctioned Hossein Ashtari and 6 other officials of the Islamic Republic of Iran on Monday, October 10, 2022, for participating in the suppression of the 2022 protests due to the death of Mehsa Amini, as well as the November 1998 protests.

Police appointments
Preceded by Esmail Ahmadi-Moghaddam	Commander-in-Chief of the Iranian Police; 9 March 2015 – 7 January 2023	Succeeded by Ahmad-Reza Radan
Preceded by Ahmad-Reza Radan	Second-in-Command of the Iranian Police; 27 May 2014 – 9 March 2015	Succeeded by Eskandar Momeni
Preceded by Unknown	Commander of Iranian Security Police; 2005 – 27 May 2014	Succeeded by Gholamreza Rezaeianfar
