= Awards and decorations of the Islamic Republic of Iran Armed Forces =

Honours issued by the Iranian government

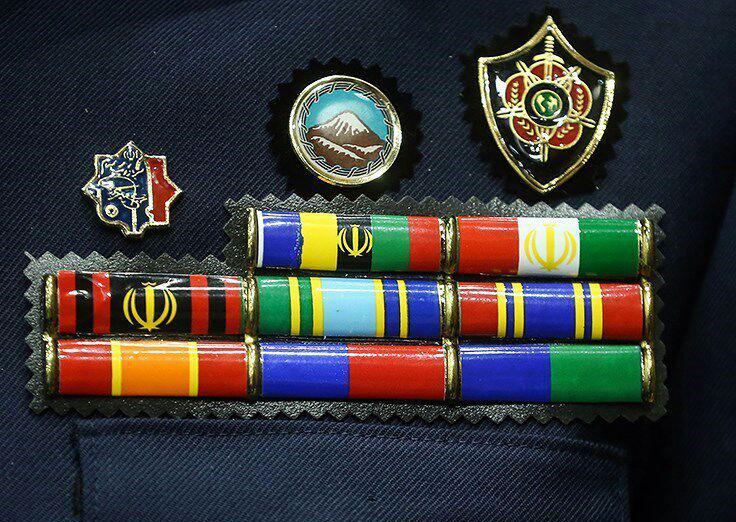
Ribbon bars, badges and medals of an Iranian General.

Islamic Republic of Iran Armed Forces awards and decorations are the collections of military awards which granted to Iranian military based on their performance history. One of the most common awards are Medals. The Medal is a symbol that, with the agreement of the Commander-in-Chief of the Iranian Armed Forces, is accorded to the armed forces in order to appreciate, encourage and strengthen the morale. Recipients will be allowed to install these medals on their identical clothing in accordance with the specific instructions of each medal. Before the Islamic Revolution, various military awards and decorations were used. After the revolution, while many signs of the Imperial era were obsolete, new titles were planned to design to thank the efforts of the armed forces of the Islamic Republic of Iran. Among the military honors created by the Persian Empire, medals of Zolfaghar, Knowledge, Razi, Art and Sports are still being used. The first presentation ceremony of military awards for Iranian commanders in Iran was held on September 27, 1989, on the day of Operation Samen-ol-A'emeh.

== Order of precedence ==
While each service has its own order of precedence, the following general rules typically apply to all services:

1. Superior badges of Honors
2. Service or Skill special badge or ribbon bars.

== Superior badges of Honors ==
Name	Orders	Service ribbon	Type	First awarded	Recipients
Order of Fath	1st Order		Medal bar	September 27, 1989	Warriors with dramatic victories
Order of Fath	2nd Order		Medal bar	September 27, 1989	Warriors with dramatic victories
Order of Fath	3rd Order		Medal bar	September 27, 1989	Warriors with dramatic victories
Order of Nasr	1st Order		Medal bar	May 22, 2000	Effective forces in combat services, support activities as well as veterans and disabled veterans
Order of Nasr	2nd Order		Medal bar	May 22, 2000	Effective forces in combat services, support activities as well as veterans and disabled veterans
Order of Nasr	3rd Order		Medal bar	May 22, 2000	Effective forces in combat services, support activities as well as veterans and disabled veterans
Order of Shafa	1st Order	—N/a	Medal bar	—N/a	Rescuers who have been threatened to sustain the lives of their combatants
Order of Shafa	2nd Order	—N/a	Medal bar	—N/a	Rescuers who have been threatened to sustain the lives of their combatants
Order of Shafa	3rd Order	—N/a	Medal bar	—N/a	Rescuers who have been threatened to sustain the lives of their combatants

== Service or Skill special badge or ribbon bars ==
=== Army ===
Ribbon/award name
Promotional awards
Badges awarded for courage in battles

Zulfaqar

Sacrifice

Disabled Veterans

Courage

Merit and Skill awards

Jihad

Glory

Merit

Knowledge

Razi

Art

Sport

Ribbon/award name
Achievement awards
Supreme Military education awards

Strategic Sciences course

Dafoos (AJAUCS) course

Special Courses Awards

Supervision course

Superior course

Specialty course

Preliminary course

Officers' Academy courses

Third course of Officers' Academy

Second course of Officers' Academy

First course of Officers' Academy

Military Training Camp course

Non-military Higher education Awards

Doctorate

Master's Degree

Bachelor's Degree

Associate Degree

sign of "War thoughts course of LG Sayyad Shirazi»

Military Courses Badges
DAFOOS (AJAUCS)

Military Training badge

Second course of Officers' Academy

First course of Officers' Academy

==== Ground Force ====
Parachutist Badge
Parachutist Master - 1st Class

Parachutist Master - 2nd Class

Parachutist Master - 3rd Class

Parachutist - 1st Class

Parachutist - 2nd Class

Parachutist - 3rd Class

Military Courses Badges
IRIGF Military Training Course

Ground Supervision Course Badge

Ground Superior Course Badge

Ground Specialty Course Badge

Ground Preliminary Course Badge

==== Navy ====
Marine Warfare badges
Surface Warfare

Special Diver 1st Class

Special Diver 2nd Class

Special Diver 3rd Class

Marine Special Forces (SBS)

Military Courses badges
Imam Khumeini Marine Sciences Academy

IRIN Military Training Camp course

Marine Supervision Course

Marine Superior Course

Marine Preliminary Course

==== Air Force ====
Aviator badge
F-4 Pilot wing

F-5 Fighter Pilot wing

F-14 Fighter Pilot wing

Military courses badges
Shahid Sattari Aeronautical University

Shahid Khazraei Flight Training Camp

Air Supervision Course

Air Superior Course

Air Specialty Course

Air Preliminary Course

==== Air Defense Force ====
Anti-Aircraft badges
Fighter Controller and Radar

Anti-aircraft Operation
(Silver badge)

Anti-aircraft Operation
(Bronze badge)

=== Islamic Revolutionary Guard Corps ===
Military courses badges
IRGC Command & Staff University

=== Islamic Republic of Iran Police ===
Chest badges
Traffic Police (Rahvar)

Military courses badges
Amin Police University
