= Use of excessive force by the Police Command of the Islamic Republic of Iran =

Excessive force of the Police Command of the Islamic Republic of Iran addresses the issue of police brutality and the arbitrary and illegal violence within the Police Command of the Islamic Republic of Iran. The violence of this police force against detainees, in cases such as Mehrdad Sepehri in Mashhad and Bahareh Cheshmbarah in Abadan, the killing of Mahsa Amini, the violent suppression of political and social protesters in the streets, their night raids on the homes of criminals in Tehran, and the humiliation of suspects by putting an "aftabeh" kettle for personal hygiene around their necks and displaying them in public, are among the incidents that have provoked widespread reactions.

Some believe that the obligation of the Police Command of the Islamic Republic of Iran to prevent the violation of Sharia rulings by the people has led the police in this period to become more of a source of psychological insecurity among citizens than a foundation for the safety of the people of the country. The use of violence against the people for not adhering to social norms and the enforcement of compulsory hijab are other actions of the Police Command of the Islamic Republic of Iran that have been criticized.

== Background ==
The brutality of the Police Command of the Islamic Republic of Iran has been examined from the perspective of the violence perpetrated by its own personnel and the institutionalized violence within this system. The fate of protesters arrested by this force has also attracted the attention of foreign media. In many cases, the intensity of violence in the detention centers of the Police Command of the Islamic Republic of Iran has been exposed. In general, the approach of the Islamic Republic’s repressive apparatus, including the Police Command, has been determined at the highest levels of government and by Ali Khamenei himself.

== Ignoring social and civil rights ==
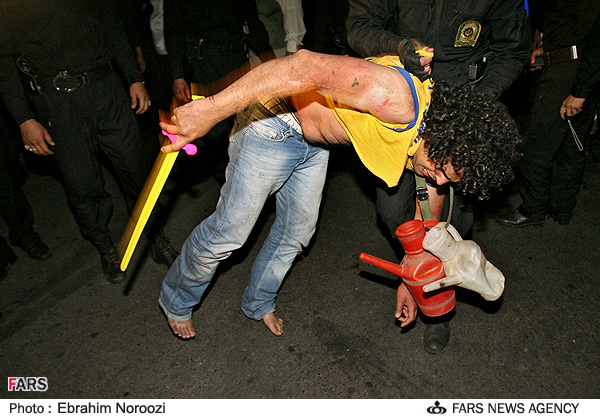
The humiliation of an individual by police by placing a aftabeh around the person’s neck and handing them a plastic sword.

In May 2007, a report was published about a midnight raid by masked police officers on the homes of "thugs" in Tehran, dragging these individuals out under a barrage of punches and kicks, humiliating them by placing an aftabeh, a kettle used for personal hygiene, around their necks, and parading them around the neighborhood. In one of the photos, the police are seen applying pressure to the face of the accused or criminal with a boot. The photos show the "aftabeh" kettle hanging from the neck of the accused or criminal by a strap, and in another photo, the spout of the "aftabeh" kettle is inserted into their mouth, forcing them to speak. In one image, a plastic sword is given to the accused.

Esmail Ahmadi-Moghaddam, the former commander of the Police Command, stated that during the protests on Tasu'a and Ashura of 2009, supporters of the Green Movement ran over people with a Police Command vehicle.

== Confronting minorities and underage people ==
In May 2017, the "Baloch Activists Campaign" reported that gunfire from the Police Command on May 21 led to the killing of a Sunni cleric and injured two other citizens in the Sib and Suran County.

According to Radio Farda in 2018, "In recent years, some children in Sistan and Baluchestan province and other cities in Iran have been killed as a result of shootings by Police Command officers during the pursuit of suspects." This report referred to an incident on October 6, 2017, when during a raid by the Police Command on a house in Iranshahr, a three-year-old boy and his father were killed. Also covered a report in which officers fired at a vehicle, killing not only the driver but also a 3-year-old girl and two young men, aged 18 and 23, who were in the car.

In July 2019, a video was released showing a male police officer violently dragging a screaming girl with him and, despite objections from a group of bystanders, forcing her into his Law Enforcement vehicle. The commander of Greater Tehran's Police Command announced that the report indicated a group of young people had violated social norms, and these individuals had initially received a warning from the police and had behaved inappropriately towards the officer. On the other hand, a witness stated that the girl was at the park playing in the water, and when the police arrived, her friends fled, but she stayed behind and was beaten after "responding to the police."

The killing of Mehrdad Sepehri in October 2020 was one of the incidents that became widely known in Iranian society and sparked numerous reactions. In the video of the event, "a man has his hands bound to a pole, and a police officer approaches him and shocks him with a taser. The man with his hands bound falls to the ground. In subsequent images, the police continue to shock him, and words are exchanged between them, and the man falls to the ground again." Sepehri's family announced that he ultimately died from asphyxiation due to pepper spray. Following this, users began comparing the statements of Ali Khamenei, the Supreme Leader of the Islamic Republic, about the behavior of the U.S. police towards George Floyd and this incident.

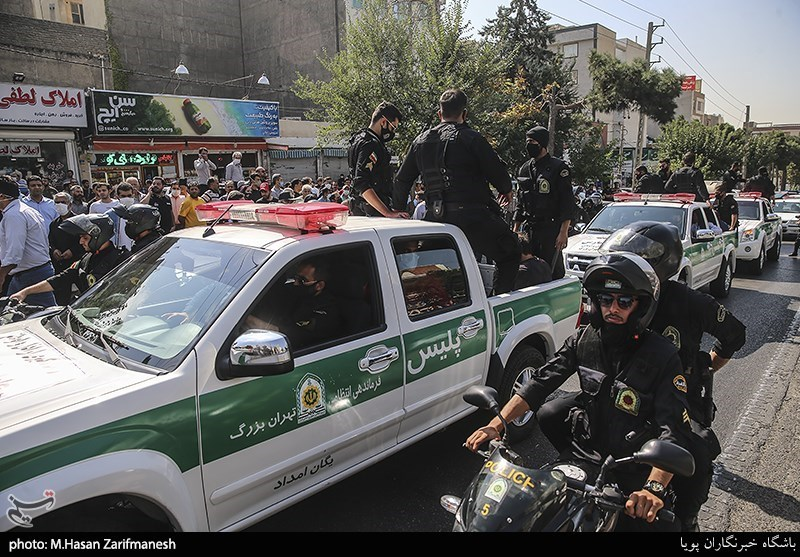

In October 2020, when media attention was focused on this issue, it was reported that masked officers paraded suspects through the streets of Tehran and, through beatings, forced them to express regret. The distribution of these images sparked outrage among users on [[Twitter]] and [[Instagram]]. In some of the images from the parade, the suspects, while being beaten by large, masked police officers, were heard shouting to the public, "We made a mistake, sorry." Previously, similar photos of parading suspects involved in the attack on Sina Hospital in Rasht had also attracted attention.

In November 2020, a report on BBC Persian stated that "in recent years, the usual pattern has been: images of violence by military and security forces are published on social media; protests against this illegal and unethical action spread across the virtual space; Islamic Republic officials then attempt to deny or justify the crime. In recent days, the beating or killing of several Iranian citizens by police forces has received widespread attention in the virtual space." In this report, the approach of the police during the Islamic Republic era was compared to that of a police state, and it was stated that the foundations of police states everywhere, including in Iran, have become unstable.

In April 2021, the Police Command of Mashhad paraded a number of young people and teenagers (some of whom were underage), who were accused of participating in the Iranian celebration of "Chaharshanbe Suri," by attaching placards to them in a public display throughout the city. Domestic media in Iran described this as a "preventive measure," although it was unclear what crime was being prevented. Subsequently, some described this action as medieval and reported that several of the individuals were injured. According to ''HRANA'', the news agency of the Human Rights Activists in Iran, "In recent years, the Law Enforcement Force has occasionally paraded suspects through the streets, an action that contradicts human rights conventions, domestic laws, and violates human dignity.

On the other hand, in February 2021, Hossein Ashtari, the commander of the Law Enforcement Force, emphasized "enforcing the law with Islamic compassion." He also announced that "the special forces are with the people and alongside them in all areas."

In May 2021, during a shooting incident by the Law Enforcement Force in Iranshahr, Sistan and Baluchestan province, a five-year-old child was killed, and the child's parents and another person were injured when the police fired at a vehicle suspected of "drug trafficking."

In May 2022, a video from the Latiyan Dam road was reposted on social media showing an undercover officer and two police officers physically trying to arrest a woman, causing her to fall to the ground. This video sparked widespread reactions and criticism.

== Iranian Police Special Units ==
The Special Units (Yegan-e Vishé) have been referred to as the "most repressive anti-riot force of the Islamic Republic." The history of the Special Units roughly parallels the history of street uprisings during the Islamic Republic era. While the reputation of affiliated committees was once linked to raids, arrests, and party busts, the Special Units transformed these actions into armed confrontations with protesters, resorting to shooting and killing such individuals in the streets. According to organizations like Amnesty International, at least 304 people were killed by security forces during just three days of the November 2019 protests, and the forces deployed by the government were primarily composed of Special Units and plainclothes officers. By 2021, the Special Units had participated in eight major experiences of suppressing protests.In one of the bloodiest street suppressions in the history of the Islamic Republic, which occurred over just three days between November 24 and 26, 2019, the Special Units were the key force present in the streets for repression.

== Iranian Police Criminal Investigation Department - Polis Agahi Faraja ==
The Iranian Police Criminal Investigation Department of the Islamic Republic of Iran (Polis Agahi Faraja) is one of the units of the Law Enforcement Command of the Islamic Republic of Iran. According to the law of the country, it serves as an investigative authority for the judiciary. Saeed Madani, a sociologist, stated that the Criminal Investigation Department is one of the organizations within the Law Enforcement Command that, both in the past and in the present, has used violence, force, and even torture as one of its methods of operation.

== Reasons and associated effects ==
=== Obligation to prevent the violation of Sharia ===
According to a report by Euronews in 2020, some believe that the obligation of the Islamic Republic of Iran's police to prevent the violation of Sharia rulings by the people has led the police, in this period, to become more of a source of psychological insecurity among citizens rather than a foundation for the safety of the people. Saeed Madani, a sociologist, stated that the obligation for the Police Command to prevent the violation of Sharia laws is ambiguous; the Police Command is considered a judicial authority, not a religious or Sharia authority, and most of the interventions by the Police Commande have been related to violations of the law. Regarding the hijab, depending on the policies and laws given to the Law Enforcement Force, this force may resort to harsh actions against those whose hijab does not meet the standards of the Islamic Republic. He also mentioned that for a long time, one of the daily duties of the Law Enforcement Force had been to collect satellite dishes from the people, a policy directed by the Ministry of Interior.

=== Inconsistency of police behavior ===
In a normal situation, the public's reaction to the presence of the Police has been different, as the behavior of the Police towards the people of the country has also varied. ThePolice has exhibited completely different or diverse behaviors in affluent and middle-class areas compared to impoverished or peripheral neighborhoods. Therefore, from this perspective, the behavior of the Police has not followed a consistent protocol. The presence of the Police in northern parts of the city has been seen as a source of safety or security, while in the southern parts of the city (which are described as areas of poverty in this period), the presence of the Police signifies tension, confrontation, and psychological insecurity.

=== Role of social media ===
Saeed Madani, a sociologist, stated: "Thanks to the virtual space and the technological communication tools available to the people of Iran, this incident has been captured on video and made publicly visible, something that was almost impossible in the past. In this regard, it seems that the behavior of the Iranian police has become much more cautious and precise. The ability to watch police violence in virtual spaces can play a very important role in controlling police brutality. In addition, public opinion is also shaped through the virtual space, and this can lay the groundwork for future public reactions to police violence."

== Misogyny ==
In April 2018, Radio France International published a report titled "The 40-Year History of Police Violence Against Women and Girls in Iran," which also addressed issues related to compulsory hijab in Iran. The media outlet highlighted the image of a young Iranian girl clashing with a female officer of the Police and wrote: "However, there is still no directive regarding how the Police should handle the dress code of women and even men in Iran, and it seems that until then, it is unlikely that one can hope for the repetition of such incidents or similar behaviors to stop." After the girl was beaten by the officer, artists reacted strongly, with some sharing similar experiences, such as having their hair cut by Police officers.

== Public reactions ==
Slogans such as "Police Command, shame, shame" or "Police Command, why the fratricide?" are among the slogans of protesters in opposition to this force.

In October 2020, social media users reacted widely to a recent action by the Islamic Republic of Iran's police, which involved parading and beating suspects in Tehran and several other cities in Iran. In some of these reactions, this act was compared to the behavior of the terrorist group ISIS towards its opponents and prisoners. In addition to criticizing the extrajudicial nature of the action, social media users also highlighted the violence of the police and condemned this "savagery." Some users labeled the act as a form of "torture" and questioned what happens in prisons when this is how suspects are treated in public displays. Other users specifically addressed the torture of Navid Afkari and other prisoners following this event.

Hatem Motahari wrote about this: "The police in Iran, in front of thousands of people, hits the head and body of the suspect and forces them to insult themselves. Then, they expect us to believe that nothing happened to Navid Afkari in the detention center or interrogation room, and that the trial was fair." Zia Nabavi, an Iranian student activist and former political prisoner, described the police 's treatment as "a small part of what happens to suspects in detention centers." Another user, by posting videos of the actions of the Iranian government and ISIS, pointed out the "similarity" between the two.

== Human rights sanctions ==
Such actions have been accompanied by human rights sanctions. For example, in April 2021, Hassan Karami, the commander of the Iranian Police Special Units, Hossein Ashtari, the commander of the Police Command of the Islamic Republic of Iran, Gholamreza Ziyaei, the head of Evin Prison, and several others were added to the European Union's human rights sanctions list for their role in the violent suppression of the November 2019 protests in Iran. Earlier, the U.S. Department of State, on November 19, 2020, imposed sanctions on key officials responsible for the massacre of protesting civilians in the marshes of Mahshahr during the November 2019 protests. Among these officials were Brigadier General Haidar Abbaszadeh, the commander of the Law Enforcement Force in Khuzestan Province, and Colonel Reza Papi, the commander of the Police in Mahshahr, who were accused of widespread and brutal human rights violations. According to reports, Iranian protesters fleeing from military equipment sought refuge in the marshes, and under the command of Haidar Abbaszadeh and Reza Papi, the police set fire to the marshes and opened fire on the protesters, killing at least 148 citizens in the process. An eyewitness stated, "None of those who sought refuge in the marshes returned alive."

== Reactions of individuals and organizations ==
- Reza Pahlavi, the eldest son of Mohammad Reza Shah Pahlavi, after the escalation of the protests in Kazerun in 2018, during which security forces opened fire and protesters entered the police station, tweeted about "another crime, this time in Kazerun" and wished for the people of Iran to have "freedom and democracy" soon.
- Abdolreza Davari, a politician close to Mahmoud Ahmadinejad, compared the current era of violence to the period before the 1979 revolution on his Twitter account and concluded that the situation was worse under the Islamic Republic: "One must be fair; in the Pahlavi era, if there was any violence, it was limited to SAVAK, the Joint Committee for Anti-Subversion, and military courts, dealing with political and security matters. No matter how much I search from that period, especially after the land reforms, I find neither a similar treatment of the girl from Abadan nor an equivalent to the killing of Mehrdad Sepehri! Where are we headed?"
- Seyed Ebrahim Raisi, whan he was the head of the Judiciary of the Islamic Republic of Iran, reacted to the killing of Mehrdad Sepehri by saying, "The police should not be weakened." Raisi also stated in a session of the Supreme Council of the Judiciary, "We must be vigilant about enemy movements, as they seek to exploit an incident that happened in a corner to completely tarnish the position and identity of an institution." He also described the media coverage of this news as a "psychological warfare by the enemy."
