= Centre for Strategic Studies of the Iranian Law Enforcement Force =

Iranian think tank and research institute

Centre for Strategic Studies of NAJA (Persian: مرکز مطالعات راهبردی ناجا) is a think tank and strategic studies research institute affiliated with the Law Enforcement Force of Islamic Republic of Iran. It was directed by Brigadier General Ahmad-Reza Radan.
