= Iranian Public Security Police =

Public Security Police پلیس امنیت عمومی
- Common name: Security Police
- Abbreviation: PAVA

Operational structure
- Parent agency: Police Command of the Islamic Republic of Iran

Public Security Police of FARAJA (Persian: پلیس امنیت عمومی فراجا, Polis-e Amniat-e Omumi-ye Faraja) or simply Security Police (Persian: پلیس امنیت, Polis-e Amniat), is a domestic security agency and law enforcement agency in Iran. The agency a subdivision of Police Command of the Islamic Republic of Iran and part of Council for Intelligence Coordination. it was split to separate independent entities in December 2021, part of Iranian Intelligence Community. Its headquarters was destroyed by Israel in June 2025 during the Twelve-Day War.

== Organization ==
The PAVA has several branches subordinated to it. The most important ones are the intelligence branch, the diplomatic police, the Foreign Nationals and Immigrants’ Affairs Office, the police in charge of surveillance over public facilities and the Moral Security police.

=== Intelligence branch ===
The Intelligence branch is a branch of PAVA in charge for gathering operational intelligence in social aggregations of various types, running informers networks in order to collect information, news, and rumors.

=== Public Security Police ===
The Public Security Police is involved with the fight against organized crime and enforcing the Iranian telecommunications law. In recent years, the Public Security

=== Police in charge of Supervision over Public Facilities and Locations ===
The police in charge of Supervision over Public Facilities and Locations (Persian: پلیس مسئول نظارت بر تأسیسات و اماکن عمومی است, polis-e-e nazarat- bar- amaken-e omumi) is responsible for regulating and controlling businesses such as shops, restaurants, and hotels.

=== Moral Security Police ===
The Moral Security Police (Persian: پلیس امنیت اخلاقی, police-e amniyat-e akhlaghi) is a sub-branch of PAVA acting as the Islamic religious police centre.

== History ==
The headquarters of the organization was destroyed by Israel according to the Israeli defence minister Israel Katz in an airstrike on 18 June 2025 during the Twelve-Day War.

== See also ==
- Intelligence-led policing
- Islamic religious police
