= Samad Samadianpour =

Iranian General (1919–1982

Timsar Samad Samadianpour
- صمد صمدیان پور
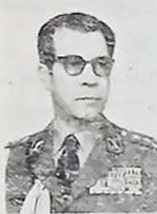
- Samadianpur in 1971

Chief of the Shahrbani
- In office 1 August 1973 – 13 January 1979
- Monarch: Mohammad Reza Pahlavi
- Prime Minister: Amir-Abbas Hoveyda; Jamshid Amouzegar; Jafar Sharif-Emami; Gholam Reza Azhari; Shapour Bakhtiar
- Preceded by: Jafargholi Sadrii
- Succeeded by: Mehdi Rahimi

Deputy Chief of the Shahrbani
- In office 1969 – 1 August 1973
- Monarch: Mohammad Reza Pahlavi
- Prime Minister: Amir-Abbas Hoveyda

Head of the Shahrbani Intelligence
- In office 1963–1969
- Monarch: Mohammad Reza Pahlavi
- Prime Minister: Asadollah Alam; Hassan Ali Mansur; Amir-Abbas Hoveyda

Vice Chief of the Shahrbani
- In office 1962–1963
- Monarch: Mohammad Reza Pahlavi
- Prime Minister: Asadollah Alam

Director of the Third General Directorate of SAVAK
- In office 1957–1959
- Monarch: Mohammad Reza Pahlavi
- Prime Minister: Manouchehr Eghbal
- Preceded by: Abdolali Mahoutian
- Succeeded by: Baba Amjadi

Personal details
- Born: March 12, 1919 Tabriz, Qajar Iran
- Died: April 23, 1982 (aged 63) London , United Kingdom
- Education: Officers' Academy; War University

Military service
- Allegiance: Pahlavi Iran
- Branch/service: Imperial Iranian Army
- Years of service: 1938–1979
- Rank: Lieutenant General
- Unit: Imperial Guard

Samad Samadianpour (Persian: صمد صمدیان پور; 12 March 1919 - 23 April 1982) was the Chief of Police of Iran during the reign of Shah Mohammad Reza Pahlavi.

== Education ==
Samad Samadianpour was born in Tabriz on 12 march 1919, After obtaining his high school diploma, Samadianpour entered the Military Academy (Officers' School) and completed advanced infantry courses as well as a short-term intelligence certification course. Between 1957 and 1958, during a course at the War University, he became familiar with the French language and was subsequently transferred from SAVAK to the Imperial Guard.

== Military Activities ==
Later, in 1959, he moved from SAVAK to the Imperial Guard, taking on the role of First Deputy of the Special Bureau of the Imperial Guard. Following that, he served in the Adjutant General's Office of the Ground Forces before transferring to the National City Police (Shahrbani). Between 1962 and 1963, he initially served as the Vice Chief of the Shahrbani, later becoming the Head of Shahrbani Intelligence. In 1969, he was appointed Deputy Chief of the National City Police with the rank of Major General, and was eventually appointed Chief of the National City Police with the rank of Lieutenant General in 1973.

== Leaving Iran ==
He left Iran during the 1979 Revolution and settled in London, England. Samadianpour passed away due to cancer in on 23 April 1982.
