= Guidance Patrol =

Islamic religious police in Iran

- گشت ارشاد; Gašt-e Eršâd
- Symbol commonly used to depict the Guidance Patrol (Note: The Guidance Police does not have an official symbol; however the logo of the Law Enforcement Command is found and widely used on the vice squad vehicles and uniforms.)

Agency overview
- Formed: Summer 2005 (Note: Began operations in June 2006.)
- Preceding agency: Islamic Revolution Committees
- Type: Religious police and vice squad
- Status: Allegedly Legally Dissolved on 3 December 2022; Formally Reinstated on 16 July 2023; De Facto Inactive Since Mahsa Amini Protests
- Parent department: Law Enforcement Command of the Islamic Republic of Iran

The Guidance Patrol (Persian: گشت ارشاد, romanized: gašt-e eršâd), informally known as the morality police, is an Islamic religious police force and vice squad in the Law Enforcement Command of the Islamic Republic of Iran. Its role is to enforce Sharia as defined by Iranian legislation, with a particular focus on ensuring compliance with Islamic dress codes, such as mandating that women wear a hijab. Established in 2005 as the successor to the Islamic Revolution Committees, the Guidance Patrol reports directly to the supreme leader. Though still in existence under Iranian law, in the aftermath of the Mahsa Amini protests the activities of the patrol were suspended indefinitely.

== History ==
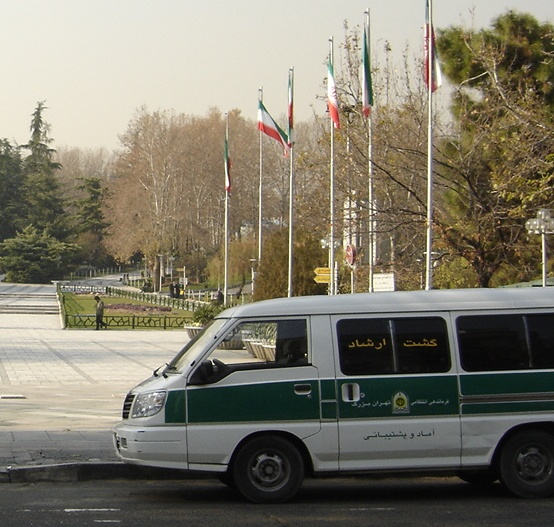
A Guidance Patrol van parked in front of Mellat Park, Tehran

Since the 1979 Iranian Islamic Revolution, Iranian law has required all women in the country to wear a hijab that covers the head and neck and conceals the hair.

Throughout the 1980s and 1990s, the Islamic Revolution Committees functioned as Islamic religious police in Iran. In 2005, they were succeeded by the Guidance Patrol which now serves as the official religious police and reports directly to the Supreme Leader of Iran.

On Iranian Mother's Day in 2013, the Guidance Patrol distributed flowers to women wearing the chador, the preferred style of hijab.

In 2014, Iran's Interior Minister reported that approximately 220,000 women were taken to police stations and signed statements promising to comply with hijab requirements for a period of three months. An additional 19,000 women received hair-covering notices, and 9,000 were detained for violations. That same year, the police reportedly issued warnings and guidance to 3.6 million Iranians for failing to observe the Islamic dress code.

In 2015, during an eight-month period, police in Tehran stopped 40,000 individuals for dress code violations while driving; most of their vehicles were impounded, typically for a week.

In 2016, Tehran deployed 7,000 undercover Guidance Patrol officers to identify and report violations of the dress code.

=== Death of Mahsa Amini ===
On 13 September 2022, the Guidance Patrol arrested Mahsa Amini, a 22-year-old woman, for allegedly wearing her headscarf improperly, in a manner that allowed some of her hair to be visible. She died while in custody three days later. The official cause of death was heart failure; however, bruises on her legs and face suggested to many that she had been beaten, despite police denials. Multiple medical officials and detainees who witnessed her arrest claim that Guidance Patrol officials tortured her in the back of a van before arriving at the station. Her detention and subsequent death inspired a wave of protests in Iran, including at Tehran University and Kasra Hospital, which was where she died.

Amini's death sparked major protests, "unlike any the country had seen before", the "biggest challenge" to the government, with an unknown organization starting riots around the country, leaving 10,000s arrested and over 500 killed. During the protests against the headscarf requirements and the Iranian government in general in late 2022, enforcement of compulsory headscarf was relaxed, and there was even an erroneous report that it would be disbanded. (Note: In December, a statement by the attorney general was interpreted by many Western media outlets to mean that the hijab law was under review and that the Guidance Patrol might be disbanded. This report later was attacked as a "diversion tactic" by the regime.)

The morality police in Iran are responsible for ensuring compliance with the country's compulsory dress code laws. As of September 2023, a morality crackdown is in process.

The list of punishments for women who disobey the dress code keeps intensifying. Hefty fines, banking restrictions, business closures, jail time, forced labour and travel bans. Being diagnosed as mentally ill.

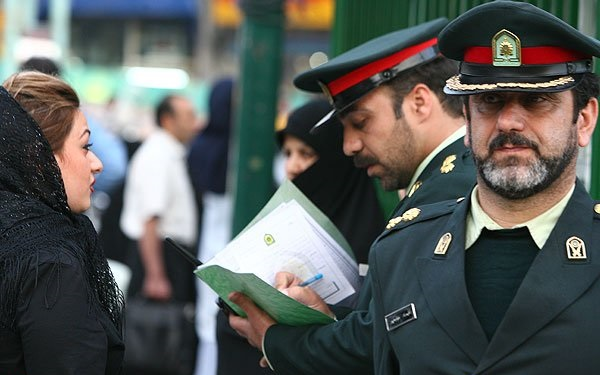
First vice squad of guidance patrol in Tehran

In mid-July 2023, after months of a large fraction of younger women ignoring compulsory headscarf, and just before the start of the holy month of Muharram, a spokesman for Iranian law enforcement formally announced that the morality police would return to the streets. (On 15 July, the day of their return to the streets, widespread internet outages were observed).

In March 2024, a United Nations fact-finding mission concluded that Iran was responsible for the physical violence that led to Mahsa Amini's death in custody. The investigation found that Amini was subjected to severe beatings during her arrest, contradicting Iranian authorities’ persistent denials. The UN report also documented systemic abuses by Iranian security forces during the nationwide protests that followed her death, including arbitrary detentions, torture, and the disproportionate use of force against peaceful demonstrators, particularly women and girls.

=== Alleged dissolution and reinstatement ===
The Prosecutor-General of Iran, Mohammad Jafar Montazeri, stated in Qom on 3 December 2022 that the police Guidance Patrol is not under the supervision of the judiciary system and was in the process of being disbanded. He also said that the hijab law is under review. However, as of 5 December the Iranian government had not made any official confirmation regarding the disbanding of the guidance patrol, and the Iranian state media denied its dissolution. It was reported that enforcement of the mandatory hijab and the guidance patrol had intensified, particularly in religious cities. In response, a three-day general strike was called by protestors, with shopkeepers closing their businesses; several experts and protestors alleged that the news of the dissolution had been announced by the Iranian government to overshadow coverage of the strike. Iranian state-run Arabic language channel Al Alam News Network denied any dissolution of the Guidance Patrol and added that "the maximum impression that can be taken" from Montazeri's comment is that the morality police and his branch of government, the judiciary, are unrelated. On 16 July 2023, the Iranian law enforcement force announced that patrols by the Morality Police would be relaunched.

=== Armita Geravand incident ===
In October 2023, a 17-year-old Iranian girl, Armita Geravand, fell into a coma and was declared brain dead after an encounter with morality police officers. The incident sparked widespread international condemnation, outrage, and criticism from human rights groups and social media users, who compared it to the death of Mahsa Amini in 2022. Iran denied that Geravand was harmed by the officers and said her condition was due to a pre-existing illness.

=== 2024 incidents ===
In April 2024, two years after the beginning of the Women, Life, Freedom movement, the Iranian government ordered more violent morality patrols. A partially implemented secret and classified chastity program law aims to prevent women who do not wear the hijab from leaving the country. VOA reported that before the 2024 Islamic Consultative Assembly elections, authorities had encouraged non-hijab-wearing individuals to vote, but later adopted a "factory reset" approach after the elections. The police began issuing penalty notices via a mobile app for unveiled women in vehicles, with fines automatically deducted from citizens' bank accounts. Additionally, the government has routinely closed public cafes and restaurants.

In June 2024, the police deployed 7,000 troops to the beaches to enforce the hijab. In August 2024, CCTV footage posted online showed police officers severely beating two teenage girls on the street and taking them away.

In July 2024, the police shut down the Tehran office of Turkish Airlines after the workers resisted police orders to cover their hair with headscarf.

In August 2024, the Minister of Islamic Culture and Islamic Guidance ordered 1,500 missionary personnel for hijab and chastity to be employed and trained by government called Mujahideen Fatimi.

=== Response from Masoud Pezeshkian ===
On July 28, 2024, Masoud Pezeshkian was elected president of Iran on a liberal platform. His vice-president, Zahra Behrouz-Azar, is a noted critic of the morality police. In September, he told a journalist that the morality police were no longer "supposed to confront" women and should not "bother" them. However, a United Nations report noted that violent incidents were ongoing.

== Activities ==
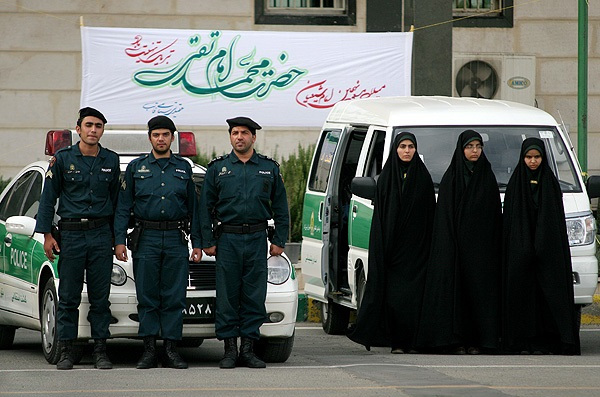
Guidance Patrol officers (right) alongside Iranian Police officers (left)

Guidance patrols usually consist of a van with a male crew accompanied by chador-clad women who stand at busy public places (e.g., shopping centers, squares, and subway stations), (sometimes assisted by Basij paramilitary), to arrest women not wearing hijabs or not wearing them in accordance with government standards. According to Amnesty International, "girls as young as seven years old" are forced to wear the hijab. The United Nations Human Rights Office said young Iranian women were violently slapped in the face, beaten with batons, and pushed into police vans. The women are driven to a correctional facility or police station, lectured on how to dress, have their photos taken by the police and personal information recorded, are required to destroy any "indecent" clothing with scissors, and generally released to relatives the same day, though many are detained. Under Article 683 of Iran's Islamic Penal Code, the penalty for a woman not wearing the hijab consists of imprisonment from 10 days to two months, and a fine of 50,000 to 500,000 Iranian rials (worth approx. $1.20 to $11.90 USD in 2024). Violators may also be lashed up to 74 times.

The Guidance Patrol also monitors immodest attire by men, "Western-style" haircuts worn by men, male-female fraternization, violations of restrictions on the wearing of makeup, the wearing of bright colours, tight clothing, torn jeans, and short trousers, and of trans women. Violations include too much hair showing from under the headscarf, and an unmarried couple taking a walk together. Trans women have been harassed for lack of gender conformity. When an Iranian trans woman was beaten in April 2018, police refused to help her.

Members of the public may turn one another in for perceived violations of the dress code, and traffic cameras are also used to identify violators of the dress code. Iran's CCTV camera systems, including those from cafes, universities, and kindergartens, transmit their footage to the police.

On 27 December 2017, Brigadier General Hossein Rahimi, head of the Greater Tehran police, said: "According to the commander of the NAJA, those who do not observe Islamic values and have negligence in this area will no longer be taken to detention centers, a legal case will not be made for them, and we will not send them to court; rather, education classes to reform their behavior will be offered."

=== Sanctions ===
On 22 September 2022, during the Mahsa Amini protests, the United States Department of the Treasury announced sanctions against the Guidance Patrol as well as seven senior leaders of Iran's various security organisations, "for violence against protestors and the death of Mahsa Amini". These include Mohammad Rostami Cheshmeh Gachi, chief of Iran's Morality Police, Haj Ahmad Mirzaei, head of the Tehran division of the Morality Police, and other Iranian security officials. The sanctions involve blocking any properties or interests in property within the jurisdiction of the U.S., and reporting them to the U.S. Treasury. Penalties would be imposed on any parties that facilitate transactions or provide services to sanctioned entities.

On 26 September 2022, Canadian Prime Minister Justin Trudeau stated that the Government of Canada would impose sanctions on the Guidance Patrol, its leadership, and the officials responsible for the death of Mahsa Amini and the crackdown on protesters.

== Religious differences of opinion ==
Ali Shariati, viewed as one of the inspirations of the Iranian Revolution, strongly opposed the idea of a morality police.

Some officials say that in their view the Guidance Patrol is an Islamic religious police, fulfilling the Islamic obligation to Enjoining good and forbidding wrong, and is desired by the people. Others oppose the Guidance Patrol's existence on the grounds that the authorities should respect citizens' freedom and dignity, and enforce Iranian law but not enforce Islam. The Guidance Patrol has been called un-Islamic by some, mostly because performing the requisites is haram (forbidden) when it leads to sedition. Some argue the notion should be a mutual obligation, allowing people to instruct government officials, but in practise it is strictly limited to one side.

== Surveillance methods ==
A report issued by the Independent Fact-Checking Mission to Iran noted that the Morality Police increasingly adopted new technologies to enforce its code. The mobile app "Nazer" allows vetted members of the public to report on uncovered women in vehicles and drones are increasingly used to identify uncovered women. Facial recognition software was installed at Tehran's Amirkabir University of Technology to find women not wearing the hijab.

== Similar groups and notable cases ==
- Committee for the Propagation of Virtue and the Prevention of Vice (Gaza Strip)
- Committee for the Promotion of Virtue and the Prevention of Vice (Saudi Arabia)
- Iranian protests against compulsory hijab
- Ministry for the Propagation of Virtue and the Prevention of Vice (Afghanistan)
- Mahsa Amini, Kurdish Iranian woman who died in police custody after being arrested for an alleged breach of modesty laws, causing mass protests in the country
- Zahra Bani Yaghoub, Iranian woman who died in police custody after being arrested for an alleged breach of modesty laws
- Homa Darabi, Iranian woman known for her self-immolation protesting the compulsory hijab
- Reza Zarei, former chief of Tehran Police in charge of the Guidance Patrol who was found in a brothel, was arrested, and lost his post
