= Zahra Bani Yaghoub =

Iranian physician (1980–2007)

- زهرا بنی‌یعقوب
- Born: 16 October 1980; Tehran
- Died: 13 October 2007 (aged 26); Hamedan
- Occupation: Medical doctor

Zahra Bani Yaghoub (Persian: زهرا بنی‌یعقوب, also mentioned in the media as Zahra Bani Ameri; 16 October 1980 – 13 October 2007) was an Iranian medical doctor. She died in a prison in Hamedan after she was arrested by the Guidance Patrol. The incident gained attention in the press due to the possible police involvement in her death.

== Career ==
Born in Tehran, Bani Yaghoub studied at Tehran University medical school and worked as a volunteer physician in Hamedan province. Zahra Bani Yaghoub was a distinguished young medical doctor and had several recognitions including her top rank in nationwide university entrance examination. The police told her father: "Iran does not need such medical doctors." Nobel Laureate Shirin Ebadi has taken the case and is currently the official lawyer of Zahra Bani Yaghoub's family.

== Death ==
In 2007, Iranian police launched a "Public Security Plan and Moralization Campaign". Many Iranian citizens including many women were arrested and questioned for "un-Islamic" behavior. That same year, Zahra was sitting on a park bench with her fiancé when Iranian police arrested the couple. This was considered by the Iranian judiciary to be a breach of modesty laws because the two were not yet married. They were taken to jail and held in separate cells, and Yaghoub died under custody the following day. Iranian officials claimed that the victim committed suicide by hanging herself. However the lawyer did not accept the claims and requested investigations.

== See also ==
- Death of Mahsa Amini
- Guidance Patrol
- History of fundamentalist Islam in Iran
- Zahra Kazemi
- List of Iranian women prisoners and detainees
