= Iranian Anti-Narcotics Police =

Anti-Narcotics Police پلیس مبارزه با مواد مخدر

Jurisdictional structure
- National agency: Iran
- Operations jurisdiction: Iran

Operational structure
- Agency executive: Colonel Majid Karimi
- Parent agency: Law Enforcement Force of Islamic Republic of Iran

Anti-Narcotics Police of FARAJA (Persian: پلیس مبارزه با مواد مخدر فراجا, Pelis-e Mebarzh-e Ba Mivâd-e Mixedâr-e Baja) is a law enforcement agency tasked with combating drug smuggling and the illegal drug trade within Iran. Over 4,000 officers of the agency have been killed.
