= Mass surveillance in Iran =

Iranian government surveillance of its citizens

Mass surveillance in Iran looks into Iranian government surveillance of its citizens.

== Surveillance technology ==
According to a report by surveillance research group IPVM, Tiandy Technologies is selling surveillance technology to Islamic Revolutionary Guard, police, and military. The company sells cameras and AI-enabled software, such as facial recognition technology, software that claims to detect someone's race, and "smart" interrogation tables and "tiger chairs". According to reports, Tiandy has signed a five-year deal to supply video surveillance equipment to Iran. Iran has unveiled plans for a "social credit" system as well as its own "Great Firewall," which will allow the government to block foreign information as it sees fit. Iran is said to use artificial intelligence in order to survey and crack down on women's rights groups.

== Phone apps for mass surveillance ==
On 15 February 2018, the National Council of Resistance of Iran (NCRI), a political entity previously declared a terrorist organisation by the United States and backed by the West, claimed that the country's Islamic Revolutionary Guard Corps and Ministry of Intelligence and Security are using a web of state-produced mobile phone applications to conduct "mass surveillance" of protesters and dissidents. The said spyware-enabled apps are available on Google Play, Apple Store, and GitHub.

== VPN ==
In March 2022, it was announced that using VPNs in Iran might become illegal under the new Iran Internet Law. On March 17, Article 19, along with more than 50 other organizations, including Amnesty International, Human Rights Watch, and Access Now, called on Iranian authorities and those in bilateral talks with the country to pressure the Iranian parliament to repeal the 'User Protection Bill.' Foreign tech companies operating in Iran, such as Facebook, Instagram, YouTube, and Twitter, will be required to follow all of the Bill's provisions, appoint a representative in the country, and submit the identification and history of their users' activities to the government upon request. Platforms that do not comply with the government's requirements will face bandwidth limiting and bans.

== Human rights and Iranian internet bill ==
A group of human rights organizations criticized Iran's attempts to impose extensive censorship and governmental control over the country's internet infrastructure. In March 2022, the Iranian Parliament approved the "draconian" Regulatory System for Cyberspace Services Bill — formerly known as the User Protection Bill. If passed, it "would violate an array of human rights of Iranians, including the right to freedom of expression and right to privacy." Human Rights Watch, Amnesty International, the Committee to Protect Journalists, Global Voices, and other rights organizations signed a joint statement urging Tehran to "immediately withdraw the measure in its entirety."

== Iran intranet ==
On 24 August 2020, several members of the Iranian Majlis Parliament submitted a proposal to the parliament's presidium to "organize social media," highlighting the importance of replacing foreign messaging applications with native ones. On 7 September 2020, it was reported that if Internet platforms do not comply with the Islamic Republic's laws and regulations, they will be censored.

== Crackdown on women's rights ==
In response to the women's movement that surged following Masha Amini's death under Iranian police custody, the Iranian government employed AI-facilitated practices, including facial recognition, geolocation, and web traffic analysis, to manage and suppress protests. The government introduced draft legislation to use AI-assisted tools for enforcing strict morality codes and implemented internet restrictions to curb social mobilization. The death of the Iranian teenager Armita Geravand was said to have ensued following her being surveilled without a hijab in October 2023. These measures led to the arrest of over twenty thousand individuals and the death of more than five hundred protesters. The morality police used facial recognition to enforce dress codes, resulting in warnings to over a million women about potential vehicle confiscation for not wearing headscarves, and sanctions against businesses serving women without hijabs. Iran's surveillance capabilities have significantly increased due to a surge in video recorder imports from China, which more than doubled in 2022 during widespread protests. The enhanced technology facilitates gender-based repression more efficiently and cost-effectively, raising global concerns among women's rights advocates. Reports indicate that 70 percent of Iranian women do not comply with the government's hijab regulations. The Headquarters for the Promotion of Virtue and Prevention of Vice relies on national ID card images for their surveillance databases, potentially leading to inaccurate matches and wrongful persecution. The legalization and use of extensive technological surveillance in Iran have broader implications for national and regional security according to CRF. CRF remarked that in countries with male guardianship laws such as Saudi Arabia, and Yemen, Iran and Qatar facial recognition technology could make the process of surveilling women easier and faster.
