= Islamic religious police =

Religious enforcement agency

Islamic religious police (also known as morality police or sharia police) are official Islamic religious enforcement agencies, often found in Muslim-majority countries, that oversee religious observance and public morality on behalf of national or regional authorities, based on their interpretation of sharia. Modern Islamic religious police organizations were first established in the late 1970s during the Iranian Revolution and the wider Islamic revival it helped stimulate across the Muslim world. Before this period, the regulation of public morality in most Muslim-majority states was generally treated as a socio-religious matter and enforced through civil law or more informal community mechanisms.

The powers and responsibilities of Islamic religious police vary by country. Unlike conventional police forces, which focus on crimes such as robbery and murder, Islamic religious police typically enforce prohibitions against the consumption of alcohol by Muslims, the mixing of unrelated men and women, public playing of music, and public display of affection. They may also restrict Western cultural practices such as the exchange of Valentine's Day or Christmas gifts, ensure adherence to Islamic dress codes for women (and sometimes men), and encourage Muslims to perform their daily prayers. In some jurisdictions, they function primarily as parapolice bodies issuing warnings or citations, while in others they are vested with broader police powers, including the detention of individuals.

The practice is generally justified with reference to the doctrine of hisbah, derived from the Quranic injunction to "enjoin good and forbid wrong," which obliges Muslims to promote moral conduct and discourage perceived wrongdoing. In pre-modern Islam, enforcement of hisbah was the responsibility of the muhtasib (market inspector), who oversaw commercial integrity, public order, and morality. While the focus on public morality was less pronounced in early and medieval Islam, the office was revived in Saudi Arabia, where it evolved into a formal committee supported by volunteers tasked with promoting religious observance. Similar bodies have since been established in other countries and regions.

Islamic religious police institutions have generated controversy both domestically and internationally. While they are often supported by conservative sectors, they are frequently criticized by liberals, women, and youth groups. In 2016, legal reforms by the Saudi government significantly curtailed the authority of Saudi Arabia's religious police. In Iran, former president Hassan Rouhani expressed opposition to the religious police, though under the Constitution of the Islamic Republic of Iran the presidency lacks the authority to reform or abolish the institution. In Kano State in Nigeria, the activities of the Islamic religious police have sometimes conflicted with those of the civil police; several incidents have been criticized by the public as exceeding their mandate and have sparked nationwide debate.

== History ==
The classical doctrine of hisbah, associated with the Quranic injunction to "enjoin good and forbid wrong," refers to the duty of Muslims to promote moral rectitude and intervene when another Muslim is perceived to be acting wrongly. Historically, its legal implementation was entrusted to a public official known as the muhtasib (market inspector), who was responsible for preventing fraud, maintaining public order, and enforcing public morality.

In 1976, the various committees in Saudi Arabia were consolidated under an official with ministerial rank, acting under direct royal authority. The unified Committee for the Promotion of Virtue and the Prevention of Vice was supported by volunteers who enforced rules relating to Islamic dress codes, performance of the five daily prayers, and gender segregation. With the growing international influence of Salafism and Wahhabism, the conception of hisbah as an individual obligation to monitor religious observance became more widespread. This trend has led to the emergence of activists encouraging Muslims to adhere to Islamic rituals, dress codes, and other aspects of sharia. High-profile vigilante incidents include the "Muslim patrols" in London (2013-2014) and the "Shariah Police" incident in Wuppertal, Germany (2014), both of which resulted in criminal charges.

In Iran, the doctrine of hisbah was incorporated into the Constitution of the Islamic Republic of Iran following the Iranian Revolution of 1979, where it was defined as a "universal and reciprocal duty" incumbent upon both the government and the people. Its implementation has been carried out by official committees as well as volunteer forces such as the Basij.

Elsewhere, enforcement of various interpretations of sharia-based public morality has been undertaken by the Kano State Hisbah Corps in Nigeria, by Wilayatul Hisbah in Aceh, Indonesia, by the Committee for the Propagation of Virtue and the Prevention of Vice in the Gaza Strip, by the Taliban during their first rule of Afghanistan, as well as by other groups.

== Formal legalized enforcement by country ==
=== Afghanistan ===
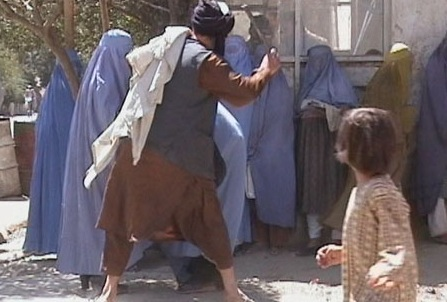
A member of the religious police beating a woman for removing her burqa headpiece in public, Kabul, 2001 (image obtained by the Revolutionary Association of the Women of Afghanistan)

Afghanistan's Committee for the Propagation of Virtue and the Prevention of Vice was first established under the 1992 Rabbani government and was later adopted by the Taliban after they came to power in 1996. The Taliban's department was modeled on a similar institution in Saudi Arabia.

The office was disbanded following the Taliban's removal from power in 2001, but the Chief Justice of the Supreme Court of Afghanistan reinstated it in 2003. In 2006, the Karzai administration submitted draft legislation to create a new department under the Ministry for Haj and Religious Affairs devoted to the "Promotion of Virtue and Prevention of Vice."

When the Taliban regained power in August 2021, they established the "Ministry of Invitation, Guidance and Promotion of Virtue and Prevention of Vice," taking over the former Ministry of Women's Affairs building as its headquarters.

=== Indonesia ===
Location of Aceh (red) in Indonesia

Following the 2004 Indian Ocean earthquake and tsunami, some local communities in Aceh interpreted the disaster as divine punishment. In its aftermath, the governor of Aceh, Mustafa Abubakar, formally launched the Polisi Syariat Islam, 'Sharia Police'.

The task force began with 13 officers in 2005 and expanded to 62 by 2009, including 14 women. In total, the organization has more than 1,000 members, of whom at least 400 are employed on contract while the remainder serve as volunteers. The Polisi Syariat Islam is tasked with enforcing compliance with Islamic law in Aceh. Critics have accused the force of employing heavy-handed tactics, including surveillance and property searches without warrants. Reported punishments range from a 24-hour detention for physical contact between unmarried men and women to public flogging for adultery.

Since 2001, Aceh has been the only province in Indonesia granted special autonomy to formally implement its own version of Islamic law, which includes corporal punishment such as flogging for certain offences.

=== Iran ===
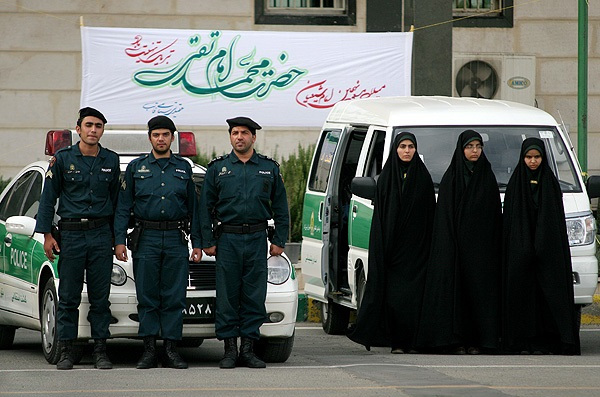
Iranian Guidance Patrol officers. The Guidance Patrol operates under the Law Enforcement Command of the Islamic Republic of Iran.

The Guidance Patrol (Persian: گشت ارشاد, romanized: Gašt-e Eršād) is the main Islamic religious police, or vice squad, within the Law Enforcement Command of the Islamic Republic of Iran. It was established in 2005, succeeding earlier institutions of a similar nature. Its stated mission is to enforce Islamic dress codes and norms of public conduct, particularly the wearing of the hijab by women, but also certain dress restrictions for men deemed inconsistent with official codes. The patrol also seeks to prevent the mixing of unrelated men and women without a male guardian (mahram), as well as other behaviours considered contrary to sharia.

The patrol has been criticised by many Iranians, particularly urban women, for restricting personal freedoms and for its methods of enforcement. President Hassan Rouhani publicly expressed opposition to the Guidance Patrol, though it did not fall within his constitutional authority.

On 16 September 2022, the Guidance Patrol arrested Mahsa Amini, a 22-year-old woman, for alleged violations of the dress code. Authorities claimed she suffered heart failure and later died after falling into a coma. Reports of bruises on her body, along with accounts from medical officials and witnesses, suggested she had been beaten, though police denied this. Her death sparked widespread protests across Iran.

In December 2022, reports circulated that the Guidance Patrol had been dissolved, but Iranian state media denied these claims.

=== Malaysia ===
The Federal Territories Islamic Religious Department (JAWI) is the religious authority responsible for enforcing Islamic regulations in Malaysia. Its chief of enforcement has been Wan Jaafar Wan Ahmad.

Punishable offences under JAWI's enforcement include khalwat (being in close proximity with a non-mahram member of the opposite sex) and adultery, which may carry a prison sentence of up to two years. Reports in local media state that religious enforcement officers have detained hundreds of couples under these provisions. Other offences include extra-marital sex, alcohol consumption, failing to fast during Ramadan, and not attending Friday prayers. The department also enforces penalties against homosexual activity among Muslims.

The role of Malaysia's religious enforcement agencies has been the subject of controversy, with critics arguing that they sometimes exceed their mandate. Legal ambiguities and overlapping jurisdictions between secular and sharia-based laws have also been identified as sources of confusion and conflict.

=== Nigeria ===
Nigeria has twelve northern states where Islam is the dominant religion. In these states, religious police are organized under the name hisbah. In 1999, several states declared the adoption of full sharia, leading to the establishment of institutions such as sharia and Zakat commissions, along with bodies tasked with "promoting Islamic virtue" and discouraging vice.

As of 2016, hisbah organizations varied significantly by state. In larger states such as Kano and Zamfara, they were formally sanctioned, organized, and funded, with thousands of salaried staff. In other states, such as Gombe, they operated entirely on a volunteer basis, while in some states, such as Borno, they existed only nominally.

According to Human Rights Watch, many hisbah members lack formal education, legal training, or knowledge of law enforcement procedures. Although there are no codified rules governing their operations, they are generally understood to be empowered to arrest offenders, but not to enter private homes or conduct surveillance based only on suspicion. In practice, however, these privacy protections have often been ignored. While hisbah groups have been responsible for floggings and beatings of suspected offenders, Human Rights Watch reported no cases of killings by hisbah as of 2004, distinguishing them from some vigilante groups. The organization has also noted that no women were serving as hisbah members.

In Kano State, the Hisbah Corps was formally established by the state government in 2003, institutionalizing previously local and privately organized hisbah groups. It operates under a Hisbah Board that includes government officials, secular police officers, and religious leaders, and is decentralized into local units overseen by community committees. The Hisbah Corps does not have authority to execute arrests and is permitted to carry only non-lethal weapons for self-defence. Officers observing violations of sharia are expected to notify the Nigeria Police Force (NPF). Duties of the Corps include mediating disputes on a voluntary basis, verbally warning individuals against infractions, maintaining order during religious events, and providing assistance in disaster response.

The Hisbah Corps has had a contentious relationship with the NPF, which has frequently refused to cooperate in enforcing religious law, and has on multiple occasions arrested hisbah members for trespassing on private property.

In 2020, the Kano State Hisbah Board destroyed approximately 1,975,000 bottles of beer valued at over ₦200 million (US$500,000) that had been confiscated in metropolitan Kano. That same year, reports described frustration among some youths in northern Nigeria, particularly in Kaduna State, regarding strict enforcement measures. Allegations included punishment for certain hairstyles, restrictions on women and girls using mobile phones or wearing sunglasses, and other perceived intrusions into personal freedoms.

=== Palestine ===
The Committee for the Propagation of Virtue and the Prevention of Vice (Arabic: هيئة الأمر بالمعروف والنهي عن المنكر, romanized: hayʾa al-ʾamr bil-maʿrūf wan-nahī ʿan al-munkar) is a group in the Palestinian territory of the Gaza Strip responsible for enforcing sharia. According to journalist Khaled Abu Toameh and Middle East researcher Jonathan Spyer, the group operates as part of the police forces of the Hamas de facto government.

The force has described its purpose as fighting "those who are being corrupted by Satan and do not observe sharia law".

In 2009, the Hamas government's Islamic Endowment Ministry deployed Virtue Committee members to caution citizens against what it described as the dangers of immodest dress, card playing, and dating.

=== Saudi Arabia ===
The Committee for the Promotion of Virtue and the Prevention of Vice (CPVPV; colloquially known as the hai'a, "committee", and its enforcers as mutaween) is an institution historically tasked with enforcing conservative Islamic norms of public behaviour as defined by Saudi authorities.

Committee members monitored observance of the dress code, gender segregation in public spaces, and whether shops closed during prayer times. Established in its most recognized form in the mid-1970s, the committee was estimated in the early 2010s to have 3,500–4,000 officers, supported by thousands of volunteers and administrative staff. The head of the committee held the rank of cabinet minister and reported directly to the king.

Committee officers and volunteers patrolled public spaces, focusing on enforcement of strict rules regarding hijab (in Saudi Arabia defined as covering the entire body except the hands and eyes), segregation of the sexes, and daily prayer attendance. They also banned certain products and activities, including the sale of dogs and cats, Barbie dolls, Pokémon, and gifts associated with Valentine's Day and Christmas.

Officers were empowered to pursue, detain, and interrogate suspected violators, administer flogging for certain offences, and arrest priests for conducting private Mass.

The CPVPV faced domestic and international criticism. Reported abuses included breaking into private homes on suspicion of illicit behaviour, and the recruitment of individuals with limited qualifications, such as former convicts whose sentences were reduced in exchange for memorising the Qur'an. The most widely publicized incident was the 2002 Mecca girls' school fire, in which fifteen girls died and fifty were injured. Reports alleged that mutaween prevented students from leaving the building because they were not wearing headscarves or abayas, and were unaccompanied by male guardians; firemen were also reportedly obstructed. The event generated significant criticism both within Saudi Arabia and internationally.

The institution retained support among conservative segments of society but was unpopular with liberals and younger people. In 2016, its powers were significantly curtailed by Crown Prince Mohammed bin Salman. A royal decree prohibited the CPVPV from pursuing, questioning, demanding identification, arresting, or detaining individuals suspected of offences.

=== Sudan ===
The Community Service Police serves as the Sudanese religious police. Originally known as the Public Order Police, the enforcement body was established in 1993 by President Omar al-Bashir. The Public Order Law was first introduced in 1992 in Khartoum State and later extended nationwide. The force was renamed in 2006.

The Community Service Police was responsible for enforcing regulations on personal behaviour, including rules against "indecent" clothing, alcohol consumption, offensive acts, and seduction, among others. In June 2015, ten female students were charged with "indecent dress" for wearing long-sleeved shirts with skirts or trousers after leaving a church. In December 2017, 24 women were arrested at a private gathering for wearing trousers, but were later released. Punishments included flogging and fines. Such cases were handled by the Public Order Court, a parallel judicial system that delivered summary judgments. Many Sudanese viewed the activities of the religious police as intrusive and oppressive, while it remained supported by Salafists and other conservative groups.

Following the July 2019 overthrow of Omar al-Bashir, Sudan began a political transition. In December 2019, the government repealed the Public Order Law, which had allowed police to arrest women for activities such as dancing, wearing trousers, selling goods on the street, or interacting with unrelated men. Those convicted could face flogging, fines, and, in rare cases, stoning or execution.

As part of its legal reform process, a political agreement signed on 3 September 2020 affirmed Sudan as a "multi-racial, multi-ethnic, multi-religious and multi-cultural society" and declared that the state would not establish an official religion nor discriminate against citizens based on religion. These reforms effectively ended the role of the Community Service Police.

=== Tahrir al-Sham and ISIL-controlled areas ===
- A religious police force known as al-Hisba operated in Idlib Governorate as of 2017, during the period when the area was controlled by Tahrir al-Sham.
- The militant group ISIL also deployed religious police, commonly referred to as the Hisbah, in areas under its control. The Hisbah enforced strict interpretations of sharia, monitoring public behavior, dress, and social interactions.

== Issues of enforcement ==
=== Haircuts ===
In 2020, the Kano State Hisbah Corps reportedly shaved the Mohawk hairstyles of young men in public in Kano City. Another report indicated that afro hairstyles were targeted by hisbah in Kaduna, despite there being no such prohibition in Islam. In Afghanistan, on 25 January 2001, the Taliban reportedly arrested 28 barbers in Kabul for giving customers haircuts styled after Leonardo DiCaprio's character in the film Titanic, according to officials at the Embassy of Afghanistan, Islamabad.

=== Hijab ===
After the 1979 Iranian Revolution, the hijab was gradually made mandatory. In 1980, it became compulsory in government and public offices, and by 1983 it was required for all women, including non-Muslims and non-citizens. From 2017 to 2019, protests were held against the mandatory hijab, with authorities reporting the arrests of 29 women.

=== Chastity ===
In 2023, the Iranian government introduced the Hijab and Chastity Bill to enforce stricter laws, such as the inclusion of artificial intelligence and mass surveillance, to monitor public chastity and women's attire.

=== Mannequins ===
In 2009, Iranian authorities warned shopkeepers not to display female mannequins with visible body contours or without a hijab. In 2010, to enforce public morality in the Gaza Strip, Hamas ordered the removal of mannequins and advertisements depicting scantily-clad models. In 2021, the Kano State Hisbah Corps instructed shops to use only headless mannequins to display clothing, and required the mannequins to remain covered at all times.

== See also ==
- Ban on sharia law
- Criticism of Islam
- Islamization
