= Islamic Revolutionary Committees =

Iranian Religious police (1979–1991)

Islamic Revolutionary Committees کمیته انقلاب اسلامی
- Logo

- Flag

Agency overview
- Formed: 1979
- Dissolved: 1 April 1991
- Superseding agency: Police Command of the Islamic Republic of Iran

Jurisdictional structure
- National agency (Operations jurisdiction): Iran
- Operations jurisdiction: Iran
- Legal jurisdiction: Islamic religious police
- General nature: Civilian police

Operational structure
- Headquarters: Tehran

Islamic Revolutionary Committees (Persian: کمیته‌های انقلاب اسلامی, romanized: Komitehāye Enqelābe Eslāmi), simply known as the Committee, was a revolutionary organization turned law enforcement agency in Iran. Founded in 1979, it merged with Shahrbani and Iranian Gendarmerie to form the Police Command in 1991.

== History ==
Founded as one of Organizations of the Iranian Revolution in 1979, after the overthrow of the Shah they served as substitutes for some of the governmental institutions no longer functioning after the fall of the shah, "such as social services, security, and police". Komiteh were "more widespread and active in cities than rural areas". They were often "located in captured police centers, in the houses of former government officials, and in some public places such as the parliament".

In the early 1980s, the Islamic Revolution Committees filled high-security prisons with thousands of female political detainees ranging in age from 10 to over 70. Many were members or supporters of opposition groups, or mothers aiding their children. Prisoners were subjected to abuse by male guards, including torture, rape, and execution. An estimated 60 women died under torture and more than 1,500 were executed, among them pregnant women, minors, and elderly women.

As an arm of Ayatollah Ruhollah Khomeini's network of clerics, they also served as "the backbone of a second power within the state, along with the militia, the army, the revolutionary tribunals", and the wealthy Islamic foundations. Before the Islamic Revolutionary Guard Corps (IRGC) was established in 1979, the komiteh "were responsible for eliminating counterrevolutionary elements within Iran", and worked to eliminate liberal, leftist, and Islamic leftist opposition to Khomeini's power. They have been described (by Gilles Kepel) as much like the Committees of Public Safety of the French Revolution, and served to control the working class supporters of the revolution who made up most of the revolution's mass of demonstrators.

During the Iran-Iraq War, the revolutionary committees also served on the war front.

Following the crushing of opposition, the komiteh turned to "enforcing Islamic regulations on social behavior", hunting down bad hejabi and enforcement of other measures, particularly among the secular middle class. They made

certain that unmarried men and women do not hold hands or walk together on the sidewalk, that storekeepers display in their shops large, glossy photographs of the nation's senior Islamic clerics, that liquor is not served at private parties and that women keep their hair, arms and feet covered, preferably in the black robes called chadors.

Made up of "mostly uneducated, undisciplined revolutionaries", at least as of 1990 they were allegedly more "feared or detested" than any of the other post-revolutionary Iranian government agency.

After the death of Khomeini and "during the first period of Ali-Akbar Hashemi-Rafsanjani's presidency", the police Shahrbani, Gendarmerie, and kominteh were merged, and a new organization, called the "Disciplinary Force" (Niru-ye entezami) or Law Enforcement Command of Islamic Republic of Iran (FARAJA), under the direct control of the Supreme Leader Ali Khamenei, was established in 1991. As of 2005, a branch of FARAJA known as the Guidance Patrol serves as a successor organisation to the Komiteh.

== Chiefs ==
- Mohammad-Reza Mahdavi Kani (1979–1982)
- Ali Fallahian (1982–1985)
- Ahmad Salek (1985–1986)
- Seyyed Sirajuddin Mousavi (1986–1990)
- Mukhtar Kalantari (1990–1991)
