= Iranian Prevention Police =

Prevention Police پلیس پیشگیری

Jurisdictional structure
- National agency: Iran
- Operations jurisdiction: Iran

Operational structure
- Agency executive: Ali Mouayyedi
- Parent agency: Law Enforcement Force of Islamic Republic of Iran

Prevention Police of Law Enforcement Force of Islamic Republic of Iran (Persian: پلیس پیشگیری ناجا) is an Iranian law enforcement agency responsible for crime prevention.
