= Shahrbani =

National police force of Iran (1913–1991)

Nazmiyye (1913–1935) Shahrbani (1935–1991)
- Official seal until 1979

- 1979–1991

Agency overview
- Formed: 22 June 1913
- Dissolved: 1 April 1991
- Superseding agency: Police Command of the Islamic Republic of Iran

Jurisdictional structure
- National agency: Iran
- Operations jurisdiction: Iran
- General nature: Civilian police

Operational structure
- Headquarters: Tehran
- Parent agency: Ministry of Interior

Shahrbani (Persian: شهربانی Shahrbâni [ˌʃæhɹbɒːˈniː]; lit. 'City Police'), formerly called Nazmiyeh (نظمیه Nazmiyye [næzmiːˈje]; lit. 'Order Service'), was a law enforcement force in Iran with police duties inside cities. Founded during the Qajar era, it was eventually merged in 1991 with the Iranian Gendarmerie and the Islamic Revolution Committees to form the Police Command of the Islamic Republic of Iran (Faraja).

== History ==
The institutional foundations of the Shahrbani were established in the early twentieth century, when Iran’s urban police were reorganized from locally based Nazmiyeh units into a more centralized national system. Between 1911 and 1935, spanning the late Qajar (1789-1925) and early Pahlavi (1925-1979) periods, successive governments sought to professionalize law enforcement using European models while promoting Iranian control and nationalization. Early reforms were introduced by foreign officers, including Count Monteforte of Austria-Hungary and later Swedish police advisers, whose role ended once Reza Shah expelled foreign instructors as part of his program of centralization. During this period, police academies and new investigative units were created, and the professional journal Nazmiyeh began publication, serving as a medium for technical instruction and moral training. These reforms transformed policing from a local, mediatory institution into a hierarchical, state-run national service that came to be known as the Shahrbani-ye koll-e keshvar (National Police).

== Chiefs ==
Reign of Reza Shah

- Mohammad Dargahi (23 December 1923 – 4 December 1929)
- Mohammad Sadeq Kopal (4 December 1929 – 22 November 1930)
- Fazlollah Zahedi (22 November 1930 – 1931)
- Mohammad-Hosayn Ayrom (1931 –20 April 1936)
- Rokneddin Mokhtari (20 April 1936 – 16 September 1941)

Reign of Mohammad Reza Shah

- Yahya Radsar (28 September 1941 – 8 December 1942)
- Abdul Ali Etemad Moghadam (8 December 1942 – 15 February 1944)
- Mohammad Hossein Jahanbani (15 February 1944 – 23 December 1942)
- Abdullah Saif (23 December 1942 – 3 April 1945)
- Mahmoud Khosropanah (3 April 1945 – 3 April 1946)
- Ibrahim Zarrabi (3 April 1946 – 26 January 1947)
- Mohammad Ali Safari (26 January 1947 – 16 February 1948)
- Ibrahim Zarrabi (16 February 1948 – 2 September 1948)
- Mohammad Ali Safari (2 September 1948 – 14 November 1949)
- Fazlollah Zahedi (14 November 1949 – 22 May 1950)
- Seyyed Mehdi Farrokh (22 May 1950 – 26 June 1950)
- Mohammad Daftari (26 June 1950 – 20 March 1951)
- Abdol Hossein Hejazi (20 March 1951 – 15 May 1951)
- Fazlollah Zahedi (15 May 1951 – 10 July 1951)
- Hassan Baghaei (10 July 1951 – 18 July 1951)
- Mansour Mazini (18 July 1951 – 30 November 1951)
- Shamseddin Amir-Alai (30 November 1951)
- Amirteymour Kalali (30 November 1951 – 18 December 1951)
- Mohammad Kazem Saleh Sheibani (18 December 1951 – 21 August 1952)
- Azizullah Kamal (23 August 1952 – 19 February 1953)
- Mohammad Kazem Saleh Sheibani (19 February 1953)
- Mahmoud Afshartous (19 February 1953 – 24 April 1953)
- Nasrallah Mudaber (24 April 1953 – 15 August 1953)
- Mohammadreza Shahandeh (15 August 1953 – 19 August 1953)
- Mohammad Daftari (19 August 1953 – September 1953)
- Mehdi Qoli Alavi Moghadam (September 1953 – September 1960)
- Nasser Amir Ansari (September 1960 – 23 October 1960)
- Nematollah Nassiri (23 October 1960 – 26 January 1965)
- Mohsen Mobasher (26 January 1965 – January 1971)
- Jafargholi Sadrii (January 1971 – 1 August 1973)
- Samad Samadianpour (1 August 1973 – 13 January 1979)
- Mehdi Rahimi (13 January 1979 – 11 February 1979)

Reign of the Islamic Republic of Iran

- Mohammad Ali Norouzi (11 February 1979 – 17 February 1979)
- Nasser Majalli (17 February 1979 – 19 June 1979)
- Seyyed Mostafa Mostafaei (19 June 1979 – 17 February 1980)
- Mostafa Mir-Salim (17 February 1980 – 5 March 1981)
- Houshang Vahid Dastgerdi (5 March 1981 – 5 September 1981)
- Seyyed Ibrahim Hejazi (5 September 1981 – 13 January 1983)
- Jalil Samimi (13 January 1983 – 11 July 1987)
- Seyyed Reza Niknejad (11 July 1987 – 30 June 1990)
- Seyyed Amanullah Mortazavi (30 June 1990 – 1 April 1991)

== Sources ==
- Aghaei, Kamran Scot (2025). "Creating the Modern Iranian Policeman: 1911–1935". Iranian Studies. 58 (3): 439–466. doi:10.1017/irn.2025.17.
