= Eskandar Momeni =

Iranian politician

- اسکندر مؤمنی
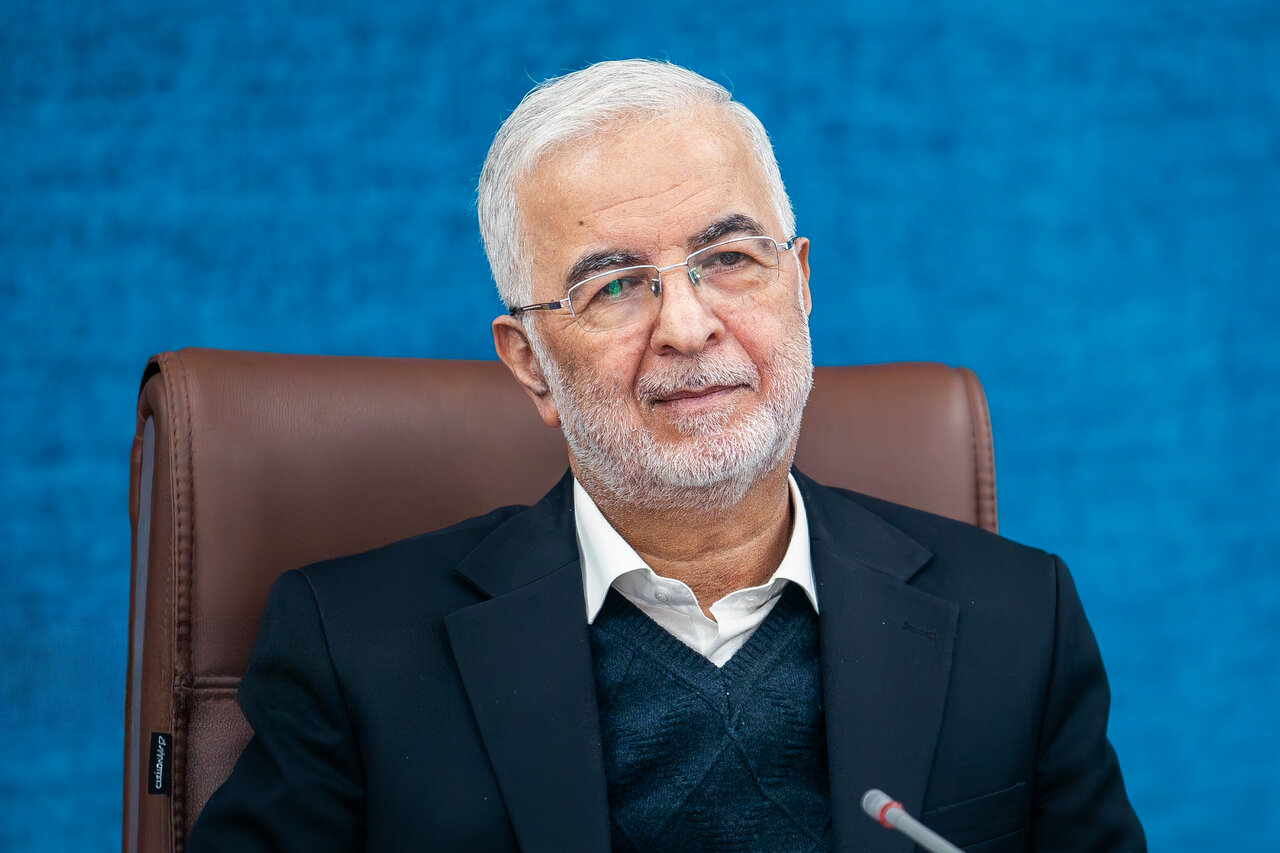
- Momeni in 2025

Minister of Interior
- Incumbent
- Assumed office 21 August 2024
- President: Masoud Pezeshkian
- Preceded by: Ahmad Vahidi

Executive of Iranian Traffic Police
- In office 2009–2015
- Preceded by: Mohammad Rouyanian
- Succeeded by: Taghi Mehri

Personal details
- Born: 1962 (age 63–64) Qaem Shahr, Iran
- Education: Supreme National Defense University
- Awards: Order of Service (3rd class)

Military service
- Allegiance: Iran
- Branch/service: Islamic Revolutionary Guard Corps; Law Enforcement Command
- Rank: Brigadier general
- Battles/wars: Iran–Iraq War

Eskandar Momeni (Persian: اسکندر مؤمنی; born 1962) is an Iranian military commander and politician who is serving as the Minister of Interior in the Government of Masoud Pezeshkian since August 2024. He belongs to the principlist camp and is described as "a relatively moderate police general".

== Biography ==
Eskandar Momeni has his background in the Islamic Revolutionary Guard Corps. Previously he served as the Chief of Staff of the Malik Ashtar Brigade and of the 25th Karbala Division and as the commander of the police force in Razavi Khorasan province. Later on he was appointed Deputy of Police Operations and from 2009 to 2015 he commanded the Iranian Traffic Police, succeeding Mohammad Rouyanian. In March 2015 he was appointed deputy commander of the Law Enforcement Command of the Islamic Republic of Iran. He served as the Secretary-General of the Anti-narcotics Headquarters from 2018 to 2025. In a speech to the parliament during his confirmation to the post he promised to try to promote social and gender equality.

== See also ==
- List of Iranian officials

Political offices
Preceded by Ahmad Vahidi	Minister of Interior; 2024–present	Succeeded by Incumbent
