= Iranian Police Criminal Investigation Department =

C.I.D Police of FARAJA پلیس آگاهی فراجا

Jurisdictional structure
- National agency: Iran
- Operations jurisdiction: Iran

Operational structure
- Agency executive: Mohammad Ghanbari
- Parent agency: Police Command of the Islamic Republic of Iran

C.I.D Police of FARAJA (Persian: پلیس آگاهی فراجا, romanized: Polis-e āgāhi') is a law enforcement agency in Iran responsible for criminal investigation.

This branch closely cooperates with the prosecution during investigations. The branch has several specialist bureaus.
