= Iranian Public Conscription Organization =

Public Conscription Organization of NAJA (Persian: سازمان وظیفه عمومی ناجا) is an organization in Iran tasked to maintain information on those potentially subject to conscription, enroll and assign them to the Armed Forces of the Islamic Republic of Iran. The agency is a subdivision of Law Enforcement Command of Islamic Republic of Iran and is headed by Brigadier General Rahman Alidoost.

== External References links ==
- Website

General rules of military service in Iran
