= Ahmad-Reza Radan =

Iranian military officer (born 1963)

Sardar Ahmad-Reza Radan
- Radan in 2026
- Born: 1963 (age 62–63); Isfahan, Pahlavi Iran
- Military career
- Allegiance: Iran
- Branch: Revolutionary Guards; Police Command of the Islamic Republic of Iran
- Service years: 1982–
- Rank: Brigadier general
- Conflicts: Iran–Iraq War (WIA)

Ahmad-Reza Radan (Persian: احمدرضا رادان; born 1963) is an Iranian military officer who has served as Iran's Chief of police, the chief commander of the Police Command of the Islamic Republic of Iran since January 2023. He is known for pursuing the implementation of Islamic Sharia law and for the suppression of the 2009 Iranian protests.

He was deputy commander of the Police Command of the Islamic Republic of Iran and Tehran's police chief, infamous for his crackdown on "un-Islamic" hair and dress styles.

He headed the Iranian police during the 2025–2026 Iranian protests, in which between 7,015 and 43,000 protesters were killed by Iranian security forces.

== Career ==
Radan started his career as a member of the Iranian Revolutionary Guards during the Iran–Iraq War. Radan held various posts in the Islamic Republic of Iran Police (IRIP), including police commander of Razavi Khorasan Province.

Radan is widely recognized for his strict enforcement of the Islamic dress code, efforts to combat drug trafficking, and crackdown on gang activity. He previously held top police posts in several key regions, including Kurdistan Province, Sistan and Baluchestan Province, Khorasan Province, and Tehran Province, the latter being Iran's most strategically significant province.

In 2007, in commanding the morality police of Tehran he said "police will start early next week a drive against women who wear improper dress." He said that "Tight trousers tucked inside long boots while wearing short overcoats are against Islamic codes," as well as "Wearing a hat or cap instead of scarves is also against Islamic dress codes." He also called for the arrest of boys with "perverted hairstyle." He also provided the morality police vehicles.

In 2009, he opposed and suppressed the Iranian Green Movement and was sanctioned by the United States, and, later, the European Union for human rights abuses. He called to crush the protestors, calling them "bastards." He also told his police to "ruthlessly and proceed to take them all out. Quash them and then take the remaining to Kahrizak prison to give them what they deserve,” in regard to the protestors.

The United States has designated Radan as a person who is, "among other things, responsible for or complicit in, or responsible for ordering, controlling, or otherwise directing, the commission of serious human rights abuses against citizens of Iran or their family members."

He was the head of Iranian police during the 2025-2026 Iranian protests in which it is estimated between 30,000 and 35,000 protestors were killed by Iranian security forces.

In March 2026, Radan said protestors who in his view are protesting for the enemy will be treated as an enemy.

== Public Security Plan and Moralization Campaign ==
In 2007, Radan launched a "Public Security Plan". The police arrested dozens of "thugs" to increase public security. These individuals were sometimes beaten on camera in front of neighborhood inhabitants, or forced to wear hanging watering cans used for lavatory ablutions around their necks.

Among those arrested was Meysam Lotfi, a young Iranian who had previously been arrested during the Iran student riots in July 1999 and jailed for six months. According to his parents, he has never had any criminal record or background of illegal activities and had never been arrested or jailed before, except for the 1999 riots. Lotfi was listed for execution, a sentence that was later changed to a three-year prison sentence after media coverage and the efforts of his parents, as well as human rights activists. His former lawyer was Abdolfattah Soltani.

== Syria ==
In 2011, Radan traveled to Damascus to support Syrian security services in their crackdown on protests in Syria.

== Disappearance ==
On 19 May 2024, Radan disappeared in the Tehran's Narmak neighborhood. Rumours alleged that he was killed in an armed attack. An Ahmed Reza Radan had claimed to be alive on 29 May although his whereabouts are still unknown.

A year later, he reappeared on live TV on occasion of the 13 June attacks.

== Sanctions ==
In October 2010, the United States Treasury Department sanctioned Radan for human rights violations. According to their statement, Radan, while serving as deputy commander of the police force, was responsible for the beatings, murders, and detentions of protesters during the protests following the 2009 Iranian presidential election.

On 13 April 2011, Radan was sanctioned by the European Union for widespread and severe violations of the rights of Iranian citizens, and for a series of murders. According to the EU statement, he, as deputy commander of the police force, was involved in "beatings", "murders", "arbitrary detentions," and "arrests of protesters" by the police during the 2009 post-election protests.

On 18 September 2024, the Canadian government sanctioned Radan, in addition to four other officials of the Islamic Republic who are directly responsible for implementing oppressive and discriminatory policies against women, girls, and minorities. The sanctions regulations prohibit transactions with the listed individuals, freeze their assets in Canada, and make any immigration to Canada of these individuals prohibited and inadmissible under Canadian immigration law.

Radan claimed that being sanctioned by the US and EU was an honor for himself and all military commanders. He stated that "becoming a martyr and being sanctioned are equally enjoyable" to him. Radan views these sanctions as a "badge of honor", comparing them to an honorary medal for serving the Islamic Republic.

== 2025-2026 protests ==
Following the 2025-2026 Iranian protests, the massacres and Internet blackout, he stated on 19 January 2026 that those protestors that were “deceived” into taking part in the demonstrations, or “riots” as the government defines them, have three days to turn themselves in.

== Notes ==
Police appointments
Preceded by Hossein Ashtari	Commander-in-Chief of the Iranian Police; 7 January 2023	Succeeded by Incumbent
Preceded by Hossein Zolfaghari	Second-in-Command of the Iranian Police; 2008 – 27 May 2014	Succeeded by Hossein Ashtari
