= Iranian Traffic Police =

Iranian Traffic Police پلیس راهنمایی و رانندگی فراجا
- Abbreviation: RAHVAR

Jurisdictional structure
- National agency: Iran
- Operations jurisdiction: Iran
- Specialist jurisdictions: Highways, roads, traffic; Vehicle safety and hazardous material transport laws and regulations, licensing, registration, insurance

Operational structure
- Agency executive: Second Brigadier General Teymour Hosseini
- Parent agency: Police Command of the Islamic Republic of Iran

Website
- www.rahvar120.ir

The Iranian Traffic Police (Persian: پلیس راهنمایی و رانندگی فراجا, romanized: Polis-e Râhnamâii vâ Rânandegi-ye Faraja, lit. 'FARAJA Traffic Police'), abbreviated as RAHVAR (راهور), is a unit of the Police Command of the Islamic Republic of Iran responsible for traffic guard and highway patrol.

== Equipment ==
=== Cars ===
- Mercedes-Benz C 240
- Mercedes-Benz E 240
- Toyota Land Cruiser 100 Series
- Toyota RAV4 XA40
- Nissan Xterra N50
- Hyundai Sonata LF Hybrid
- Kia Forte TD
- Nissan Maxima
- Renault Mégane
- Mitsubishi Pajero
- Samand
- Dena Plus
- Hyundai Santa Fe DM
- Nissan Teana
- Suzuki Grand Vitara
- Toyota Corolla E180
- Peugeot 206
- Mazda 3 BL
- Hyundai Veracruz
- Citroën Xantia
- Peugeot 407
