= Police Command of the Islamic Republic of Iran =

National police force of Iran

Police Command of the Islamic Republic Iran فرماندهی انتظامی جمهوری اسلامی ایران نیروی انتظامی جمهوری اسلامی ایران
- Official logo

- Official flag

- Ceremonial flag
- Common name: Law Enforcement of Iran
- Abbreviation: فراجا ناجا
- Motto: كُونُواْ قَوَّامِينَ لِلّهِ شُهَدَاء بِالْقِسْط "Be steadfast witnesses for Allah in equity" ^{[Quran 5:8]} (Heraldry slogan)

Agency overview
- Formed: April 1, 1991
- Preceding agency: Shahrbani (1913–1991) Gendarmerie (1910–1991) Committee (1979–1991)
- Employees: 360,000 (including conscripts and reserves)

Jurisdictional structure
- National agency: Iran
- Operations jurisdiction: Iran
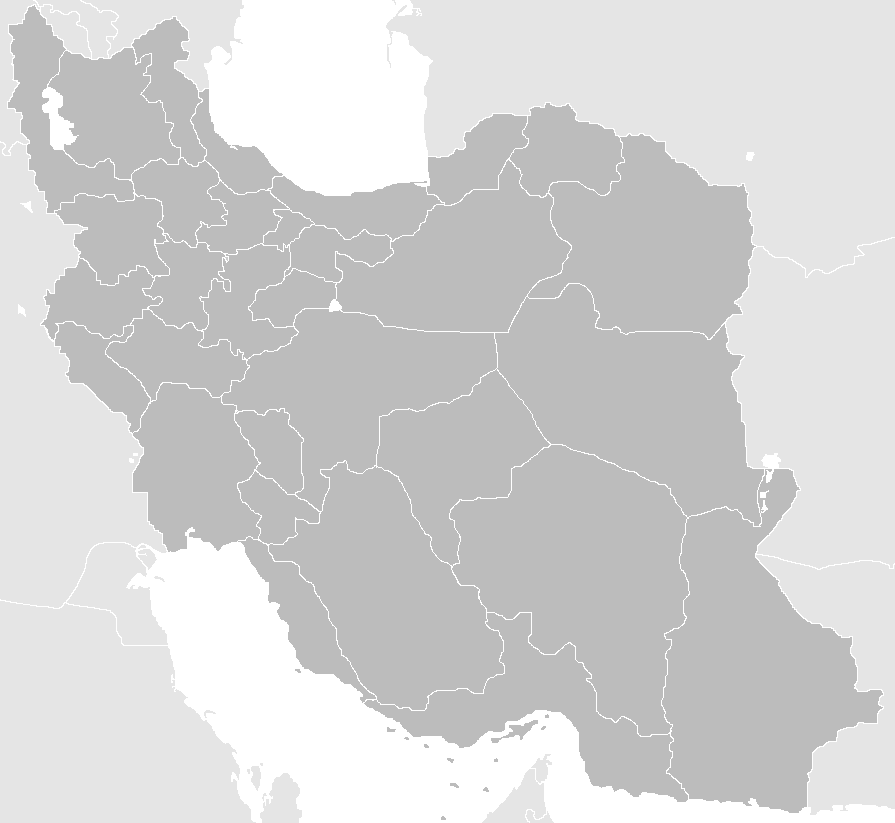
- Map of Iran with province borders
- Area: 1,648,195 km^{2} (636,372 sq mi)
- Population: 86,758,304 (2022)
- Constituting instrument: Law Enforcement Force Act 1990 (in Persian)
- General nature: Gendarmerie; Civilian police; Secret police; Religious police

Operational structure
- Minister responsible: Eskandar Momeni, Minister of Interior
- Agency executive: Brigadier General Ahmad-Reza Radan, Chief Commander
- Parent agency: General Staff of the Armed Forces

Notables
- Anniversary: 5 October

Website
- police.ir

The Police Command of the Islamic Republic of Iran (Note: Persian: فرماندهی انتظامی جمهوری اسلامی ایران, romanized: Farmândehiye Entezâmiye Jomhuriye Eslâmiye Irân) (Note: Persian: نیروی انتظامی جمهوری اسلامی ایران, romanized: Niruye Entezâmiye Jomhuriye Eslâmiye Irân) (abbreviated as Faraja or Naja) is the uniformed police force of Iran. It was created in early 1992 by merging the Shahrbani, the Iranian Gendarmerie, and the Islamic Revolutionary Committees into a single force.

It has more than 260,000 police personnel, including border guard personnel, and is under the direct control of the supreme leader, who is the head of state and Commander-in-Chief of the Armed Forces. In 2003, some 400 women became the first female members of the police force since the 1979 Iranian Revolution. The Guidance Patrol, commonly called the "morality police", was a vice squad/Islamic religious police in the Law Enforcement Force of the Islamic Republic of Iran, established in 2005 with the task of arresting people who violate the Islamic dress code, usually concerning the wearing by women of hijabs covering their hair. Though still legally in existence its activities were suspended in the aftermath of the 2022 Mahsa Amini protests.

In an emergency, the police can be reached by dialing 110 from any telephone in Iran.

== History ==
=== Early modernization (mid-19th century – 1935) ===
Seal of the Imperial Iranian Gendarmerie

The origins of modern policing in Iran can be traced to the mid-nineteenth century during the Qajar era (1789–1925), when reformist statesman Amir Kabir (1807–1852) introduced early measures to improve public order and urban administration. These limited initiatives were followed by later efforts under the Qajars to establish a regular police service. Among them was the appointment of Conte di Monteforte, an Austro-Hungarian officer, who organized uniformed patrols and attempted to modernize police procedures in Tehran between 1878 and 1889.

Building on these antecedents, the early twentieth century saw the creation of distinct policing institutions. In 1910, the Iranian Gendarmerie was established as the first modern highway patrol and rural security force during the late Qajar period, while urban policing was handled by the Nazmiyeh departments responsible for maintaining order within cities. Between 1911 and 1935 these forces were reorganized and centralized under the early Pahlavi government. Foreign advisors—first Italians and later Swedes such as Gunnar Westdahl and Sven Bergdahl (1911–1916)—helped organize new police units and introduce European administrative and training models.

After the First World War, Reza Shah Pahlavi (r. 1925–1944) moved to nationalize and centralize these forces, removing foreign control and placing policing under the Ministry of Interior. Police schools were created to train recruits, and the professional journal Nazmiyeh (1925) was launched to promote standardized instruction, discipline, and modern forensic methods.

By the mid-1930s, these reforms had transformed a patchwork of local Nazmiyeh offices into a single, hierarchical, state-run organization known as the Shahrbani (Shahrbani-ye koll-e keshvar, National Police). This period is characterized as the decisive phase in which Iran’s policing was professionalized and integrated into the modern bureaucratic state, establishing the institutional foundation for later twentieth-century law-enforcement agencies.

=== Expansion and centralization under Mohammad Reza Shah (1953 – 1979) ===
Intensely concerned with matters of internal security in the post-1953 environment, Mohammad Reza Pahlavi authorized the development of one of the most extensive systems of law enforcement agencies in the developing world. The Imperial Iranian Gendarmerie and the National Police gained in numbers and responsibilities. The secret police organization, SAVAK, gained special notoriety for its excessive zeal in "maintaining" internal security. But as in the regular armed forces, the shah's management style virtually eliminated all coordination among these agencies. He tended to shuffle army personnel back and forth between their ordinary duties and temporary positions in internal security agencies in order to minimize the possibility of any organized coups against the throne. Added to this list of institutional shortcomings was the agencies' all-important public image, cloaked in mystery and fear.

Seal of the Islamic Republic of Iran Gendarmerie

=== Revolution and reorganization (1979 – present) ===
After the 1979 Revolution, the gendarmerie, which was renamed to the Islamic Republic of Iran Gendarmerie, numbered nearly 74,000 in 1979, and was subordinate to the Ministry of Interior. Its law enforcement responsibilities extended to all rural areas and to small towns and villages of fewer than 5,000 inhabitants. The International Institute for Strategic Studies estimated its manpower at 70,000 in 1986. The Gendarmerie was dissolved in 1990 and its personnel were assigned to the INP.

The National Police of Iran operated with approximately 200,000 men in 1979, a figure that has not fluctuated much since. The National Police was also under the Ministry of Interior, and its responsibilities included all cities with more than 5,000 in population, at least 20 percent of the population. Additionally, the National Police was responsible for passport and immigration procedures, issuance and control of citizens' identification cards, driver and vehicle licensing and registration, and railroad and airport policing. Some of these duties were absorbed into the Ministry of the Pasdaran during the early years of the Revolution, and cooperation between these two branches seemed extensive.

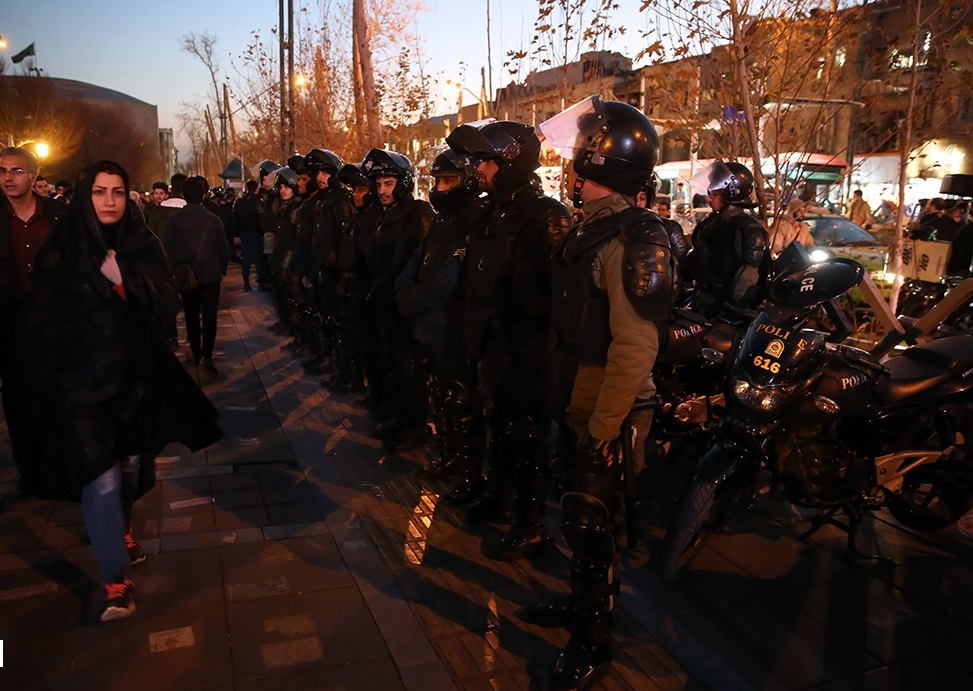
Iranian police during the 2017–2018 protests

Since 1979, both these paramilitary organizations have undergone complete reorganizations. IRP leaders quickly appointed Gendarmerie and police officers loyal to the Revolution to revive and reorganize the two bodies under the Islamic Republic. Between 1979 and 1983, no fewer than seven officers were given top National Police portfolios. Colonel Khalil Samimi, appointed in 1983 by the influential Ali Akbar Nategh-Nouri, then Minister of Interior, who was credited with reorganizing the National Police according to the IRP's Islamic guidelines. The Gendarmerie followed a similar path. Seven appointments were made between 1979 and 1986, leading to a full reorganization. In addition to Brigadier General Ahmad Mohagheghi, the commander in the early republican period who was executed in late summer of 1980 and five colonels were purged. Colonel Ali Kuchekzadeh played a major role in reorganizing and strengthening the Gendarmerie after its near collapse in the early revolutionary period. The commander in 1987, Colonel Mohammad Sohrabi, had served in that position since February 1985 and was the first top officer to have risen from the ranks.

As of 1987, the National Police and the Gendarmerie reflected the ideology of the state. Despite their valuable internal security operations, the roles of both bodies were restricted by the rising influence of the Sepah and the Basij. The Gendarmerie was disbanded in 1991, along with the National Police and Islamic Revolution Committees; all three of these organizations being merged into the present-day Law Enforcement Force.

The Police–110 unit specializes in rapid-response activities in urban areas and dispersing gatherings deemed dangerous to public order. In 2003, some 400 women became the first female members of the police force since the 1978–79 Revolution.

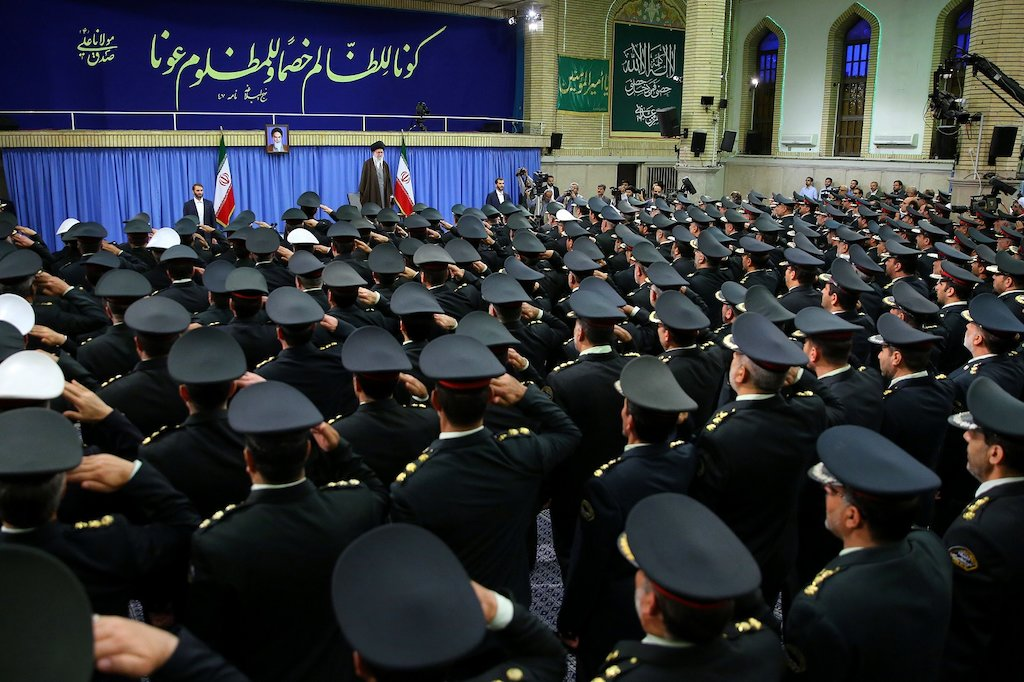
Commanders, officers and officials of the Law Enforcement Force of Islamic Republic of Iran met Ayatollah Khamenei, commander and chief of the armed forces, on 8 May 2016.

The current commander is IRGC-born Brigadier General Hossein Ashtari, former first deputy chief of police under Esmail Ahmadi Moqaddam; he relieved his predecessor and was appointed by the Supreme Leader Ayatollah Ali Khamenei on March 9, 2015.

Per a decree issued by Supreme Leader Ali Khamenei, on 8 December 2021 Law Enforcement Force structure was promoted to that of a General Command in 2021, it was thus renamed "Law Enforcement Command of Islamic Republic of Iran".

The Police Command of the Islamic Republic of Iran has been accused of using excessive force and committing human rights violations in various contexts, including during protests, arrests, and interrogations. Reports and investigations have documented cases of physical violence, psychological abuse, and public humiliation of detainees. Human rights organizations have argued that these practices reflect systemic issues within the force, including a lack of accountability and the use of policing as a means of social control.

On 31 October 2022, Mélanie Joly, Canada’s Minister of Foreign Affairs, announced that the Government of Canada was adding Police Command of the Islamic Republic of Iran to its sanctions list, in response to the police’s violent crackdown on the Mahsa Amini protests, including the killing of hundreds of demonstrators.

In August 2024 the Police Command ordered expelling of all unauthorized Afghan resident immigrants back to their country in one year. In another incident police allegedly broke an Afghan girl's neck.

== Top organization ==
All issues related to the Law Enforcement Force within the framework of the law are entrusted with the Interior Ministry; but in the areas of war, the authority lies with the Deputy Chief Commander of the Joint Forces. Top Police officers are directly appointed by the Supreme Leader. Law Enforcement Force also consists of several different provincial deputies. Provincial commanders rank between Colonel and Brigadier General, while provincial branch heads rank Colonel.

== Branches ==
The Police-110 unit specializes in rapid-response activities in urban areas and dispersing gatherings deemed dangerous to public order. Marine police have 100 inshore patrols and 50 harbor boats.

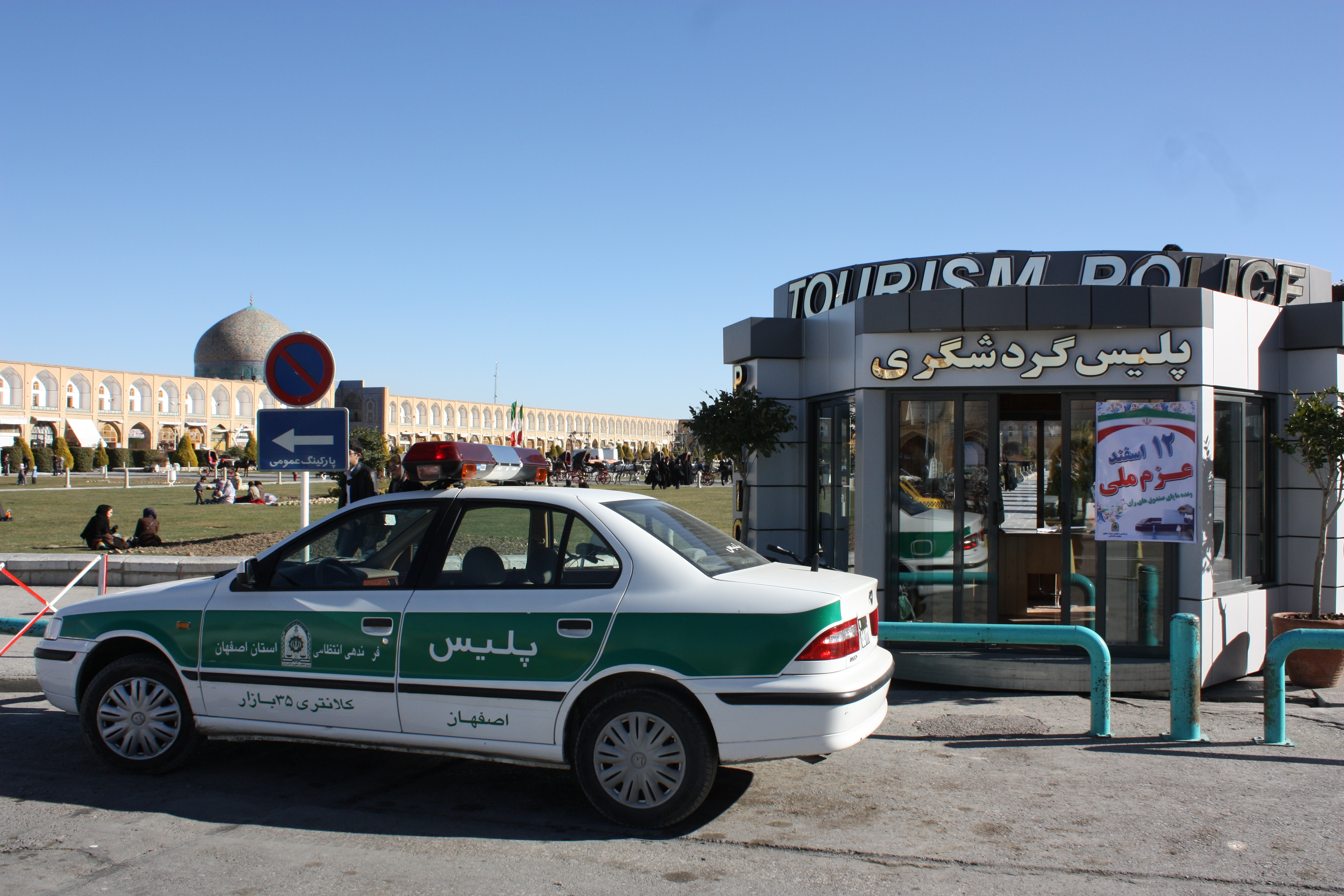
Tourism Police in Naghsh-i Jahan Square

The Law Enforcement Force of the Islamic Republic of Iran has a number of branches, each with specialized duties:

- The Iranian Public Conscription Organization (Persian: سازمان نظام وظیفه عمومی فراجا )
- The Iranian Prevention Police (Persian: پلیس پیشگیری فراجا), established in 2005;
- The Islamic Republic of Iran Police Intelligence Organization (SAFA for short; Persian: سازمان اطلاعات فراجا), established in 2022;
- The Iranian Public Security Police (Persian: پلیس امنیت عمومی فراجا)
- The Iranian Traffic Police (Rahvar for short; Persian: پلیس راهنمایی و رانندگی فراجا), established in 1991;
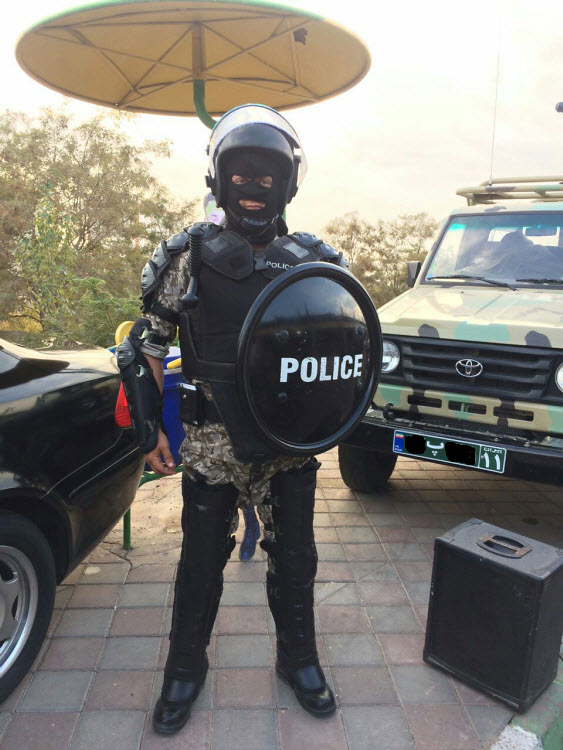
- Iranian riot police
  The Iranian Cyber Police (FATA for short: Persian پلیس فضای تولید و تبادل اطلاعات فراجا), established in 2011;
- The Iranian Anti-Narcotics Police (Persian: پلیس مبارزه با مواد مخدر فراجا);
- The Iranian Immigration & Passport Police Office (Persian: پلیس مهاجرت و گذرنامه فراجا);
- The Iranian Diplomatic Police (Persian: پلیس دیپلماتیک فراجا);
- The Iranian Police Criminal Investigation Department (Persian: پلیس اگاهی فراجا), established in 1991;
- The Islamic Republic of Iran Border Guard Command (Persian: فرماندهی مرزبانی فراجا), established in 2000, is Iran's border guard organization and its chief is Brigadier General Qasem Rezaee;
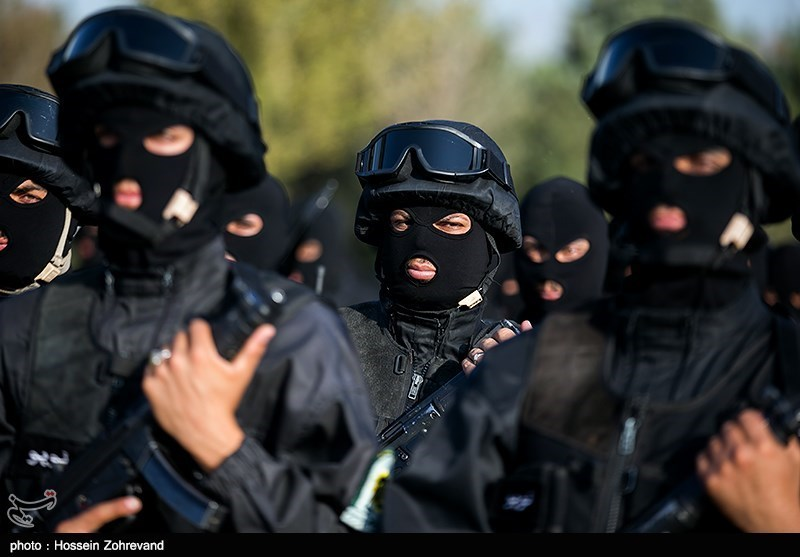
- NOPO members
  The Special Unit; it was involved in quelling of 2009 Iranian presidential election protests. It is responsible for suppressing riots, anti-terrorist activities, urban defence, and rescuing hostages. Special units include Anti-Terror Special Force ("NOPO" for short). According to a former commander, the Special Unit alone has 60,000 members across the country.
- The Police Intelligence Organization (Persian: سازمان اطلاعات فرماندهی انتظامی جمهوری اسلامی ایران), formed in 2022 and is responsible for the duties of the second pillar of the police command
- The Centre for Strategic Studies of the Iranian Law Enforcement Force, directed by Brigadier General Lotf-Ali Bakhtiari

=== Guidance Patrol ===
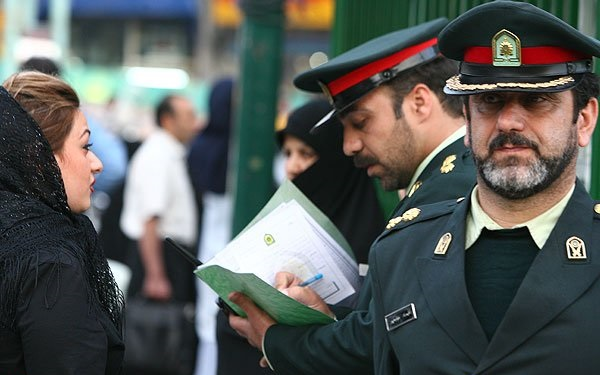
Guidance Patrol

The Guidance Patrol, widely known as the "morality police", was a vice squad/Islamic religious police in the Law Enforcement Force of the Islamic Republic of Iran, established in 2005 and allegedly dissolved in 2022, with the task of arresting people who violated the Islamic dress code, usually concerning the wearing by women of hijabs covering their hair. On December 3, 2022, the Attorney General of Iran, Mohammad Jafar Montazeri, said in Qom that the police guidance patrol is not under the supervision of the judiciary system and it is closed now from where it was begun first.

=== Branch seals ===
Criminal Investigation Police

Economic Security Police

Prevention Police

Traffic Police

Special Unit

Cyber Police

Border Police

University of the Law Enforcement Force

Public Security Police

Social Affairs Deputy

Rescue and Healthcare Deputy

== Chiefs of Law Enforcement Force ==
No.	Portrait	Commander-in-Chief	Took office	Left office	Time in office	Previous service
1	Mohammad Sohrabi	Brigadier general Mohammad Sohrabi	1 April 1991	24 September 1992	1 year	Gendarmerie
2	Reza Seifollahi	Brigadier general Reza Seifollahi	24 September 1992	15 February 1997	4 years	Islamic Revolutionary Guard Corps
3	Hedayat Lotfian	Brigadier general Hedayat Lotfian	15 February 1997	27 June 2000	3 years	Islamic Revolutionary Guard Corps
4	Mohammad Bagher Ghalibaf	Brigadier general Mohammad Bagher Ghalibaf (born 23 August 1961)	27 June 2000	4 April 2005	4 years	Islamic Revolutionary Guard Corps
-	Ali Abdollahi	Brigadier general Ali Abdollahi; Acting	4 April 2005	9 July 2005	2 months	Islamic Revolutionary Guard Corps
5	Esmail Ahmadi-Moghaddam	Brigadier general Esmail Ahmadi-Moghaddam (born 1961)	9 July 2005	9 March 2015	9 years, 9 months	Islamic Revolutionary Guard Corps
6	Hossein Ashtari	Brigadier general Hossein Ashtari (born 1959)	9 March 2015	9 January 2023	7 years, 10 months	Islamic Revolutionary Guard Corps
7	Ahmad-Reza Radan	Brigadier general Ahmad-Reza Radan (born 1963)	9 January 2023	present	3 years, 315 days	Islamic Revolutionary Guard Corps

== Territorial organisation ==
The Police Command closely follows the administrative structure of the Islamic Republic of Iran.

== Provincial level ==
In each of the 31 Provinces, there is one police provincial command (Farmāndehi-ye Entezāmi-ye Ostān). This provincial command is in charge for all the police branchess in the relevant province.

=== Provincial Security Council ===
The Provincial Security Council is the highest provincial security body and is made up of the justice administration chief as well as the provincial police chief; it has the task to manage matters pertaining to security. The council has a provincial jurisdiction charged of managing police issues, ranging from public security issues to handling of serious criminal cases.

=== District level ===
The District disciplinary command is in charge for each city that manages. It manages the police stations in that city.

=== Police station ===
The police station is the lowest level of the territorial structure of the Police command. Police stations are either urban (kalāntari) and rural stations (pāsgāh). According to official sources, there are around 3,000 police stations in Iran.

Each police station is organised around the same lines. Alongside the station commander, there are a deputy of prevention police, a deputy of police intelligence, a deputy for inspection duties, a deputy of operations and the judicial services police.

== Equipment ==
=== Weapons ===
- Heckler & Koch MP5
- SIG Sauer P220
- SIG Sauer P226
- Heckler & Koch HK21
- Smith & Wesson Model 10
- Dragunov
- Electroshock weapon
- AK-47
- Uzi
- FIM-92 Stinger
- Remington 870
- PK machine gun
- M79 grenade launcher
- DShK

=== Cars ===
- Samand
- Mercedes-Benz C 240
- Mercedes-Benz E 240
- Nissan Xterra N50
- Toyota Land Cruiser 100 Series
- Renault Mégane
- Mitsubishi Pajero
- Toyota Hilux Sixth generation and Seventh generation
- Volkswagen Transporter
- Kia Forte TD
- Hyundai Santa Fe DM
- Nissan Teana
- Suzuki Grand Vitara
- Toyota Corolla E150
- Citroën Xantia
- Peugeot 207
- Peugeot 405
- Peugeot 206

Formerly used cars

- Nissan Patrol 160 Series
- Toyota Cressida

=== Motorcycles ===
- BMW R1200RT
- Honda CMX250C
- Honda CBX750

=== Aircraft ===
- Dassault Falcon 20
- HESA IrAn-140
- Aero Commander 690
- Bell 205
- Bell 206
- Bell 212
- Bell 214
- Mil Mi-17
- Cessna 206
- Dorna D-139 Blue Bird
- Cessna 185

== See also ==
- Excessive force of the Police Command of the Islamic Republic of Iran
- Crime in Iran
- Death of Mahsa Amini
- Military ranks of Iran
- Zahra Bani Yaghoub
- Zahra Kazemi
- Police Command Information Protection Organization

== Sources ==
- Aghaei, Kamran Scot (2025). "Creating the Modern Iranian Policeman: 1911–1935". Iranian Studies. 58 (3): 439–466. doi:10.1017/irn.2025.17.
