= Flags of the Islamic Republic of Iran Armed Forces =

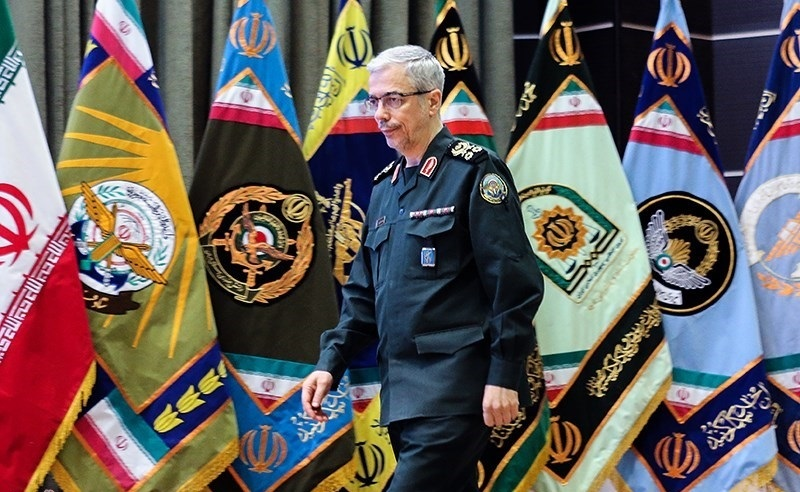
Iranian armed forces flags behind Mohammad Bagheri, former Iran's commander of General Staff of Armed Forces

The several branches of the Armed Forces of the Islamic Republic of Iran are represented by flags. Within the Iranian military, various flags fly on various occasions, and on various ships, bases, camps, and military academies.

The Armed Forces of Iran are organized into three major forces: Army (or Artesh), IRGC (Sepah) and Police (NAJA). Each of these forces have their own military branches and every branch has its own flags.

If carried on parade by colour guards, they are placed beside the Flag of Iran, which serves as the national color.

== Service flags ==
Flag of the General Staff of Iranian Armed Forces

Flag of the Iranian Army

Flag of the IRGC (Sepah)

Flag of the Iranian Police (NAJA)

== Army ==
Iranian Army has four major branches: Ground Forces, Air Force, Navy and Air Defense Force.

Flag of the Iranian Army

Ceremonial Flag of the Iranian Army

=== Ground Forces ===
Flag of the Iranian Army Ground Forces (NEZAJA)

Alternative Flag of the Iranian Army Ground Forces

Flag of Army Aviation of Iranian Army

=== Air Force ===
Flag of the Iranian Army Air Force (NEHAJA)

Alternative Flag of the Iranian Army Air Force

=== Navy ===
Flag of the Iranian Army Navy Force (NEDAJA)

Alternative Flag of the Iranian Army Navy Force

=== Air Defense Force ===
Flag of the Iranian Army Air Defense Force (PEDAJA)

Flag of the Iranian Army Air Defense Force (PEDAJA)

=== Other organizations of the Army ===
Flag of the Joint Staff the Iranian Army

Flag of Retirees Association of Army

Flag of Secretariat of the General Supervision of the Army Ground Force Command

Flag of Physical Education Organization of Army of Iran

== IRGC (Sepah) ==
Islamic Revolutionary Guard Corps has five major branches: Ground Force, Aerospace Force, Navy, Quds Force and Basij. Every one of these branches have their own standard and de facto versions of flag.

In addition, there are flags or logos that are based on the IRGC used by various Arab armed militia groups supported by Iran such as Hezbollah (Lebanon), Popular Mobilization Forces (Iraq), Sabireen Movement (Gaza Strip) and so on.

Flag of the IRGC (Sepah)

Ceremonial Flag of the IRGC

=== Ground Force ===
Flag of the IRGC Ground Force

Flag of the IRGC Ground Force - Armored Branch

Flag of Mohammad Rasul Allah Corps of Tehran

=== Aerospace Force ===
Flag of the IRGC Aerospace Force

Flag of IRGC Aerospace force (Alternate flag)

=== Navy ===
Flag of the IRGC Navy

Flag of the IRGC Navy (Alternate flag)

=== Quds Force ===
Flag of the IRGC Quds Force

Flag of the IRGC Quds Force (Alternate flag)

=== Basij ===
Flag of Basij

Flag of University Students Basij Organization

Flag of Students Basij Organization

== Police ==
Flag of the Iranian Police (NAJA)

Flag of the Iranian Police (alternate)

Ceremonial Flag of the Iranian Police

=== Police Deputies ===
Flag of Prevention Police

Flag of Special Forces of Police

Flag of Criminal Intelligence Police

Flag of Aviation Unit of Police

Flag of Traffic Police

Flag of Cyberspace Police of Iran

Flag of Retirees Association of Police of Iran

=== Old entities (obsolete) ===
Old flag of Shahrbani

Flag of the Islamic Revolutionary Committees

== Military Academies ==
Flag of the Command and Staff University of Army

Flag of the Command and Staff University of IRGC
Flag of Imam Ali Military Academy of Army

Flag of Shahid Sattari Military Academy of Army Air Force

Flag of Shahid Sattari Military Academy of Army Air Force

Flag of Imam Khumeini Naval Academy of Army Navy

Flag of Imam Khumeini Naval Academy of Army Navy

Flag of the Islamic Republic of Iran Naval Specialties Training Center

Flag of Khatamol Anbia' Air Defense University of Army

Flag of Khatamol Anbia' Air Defense University of Army

Flag of Farabi Sciences and Techniques University of Army

Flag of Army Medical Sciences University

=== NAJA ===
Flag of Amin Police University

== Ministry of Defense ==
Flag of the Iranian Ministry of Defense

Flag of the Iranian Ministry of Defense (obsolete)

Alternative flag of Ministry of Defense of Iran

Alternative flag of the Iranian Ministry of Defense (obsolete)

Flag of National Geographical Organization of Armed Forces of Iran

Flag of Defense Industries Organization of Iran

== See also ==
- Flag of Iran
- List of Iranian flags
