= Ahmad Marvi =

Iranian Twelver Shia cleric (b. 1958)

Hojjat ol-Eslam Ahmad Marvi
- احمد مروی
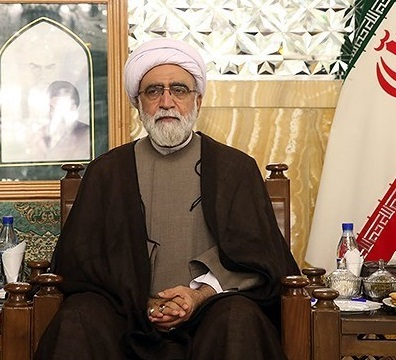

Hojjat ol-Eslam Marvi

Custodian of the Astan Quds Razavi
- Incumbent
- Assumed office 30 March 2019
- Appointed by: Ali Khamenei
- Preceded by: Ebrahim Raisi

Personal details
- Born: 1958 (age 67–68) Mashhad, Imperial State of Iran
- Party: Combatant Clergy Association
- Education: Ferdowsi University of Mashhad; Officers' School; Amin Police Academy

Ahmad Marvi (Persian: احمد مروی; born 1958, Mashhad) is an Iranian Twelver Shia cleric, former general and former police officer who was appointed the custodian of the Astan Quds Razavi by the former Supreme Leader of Iran, Ali Khamenei.

Before that, he was in charge of a department at the Office of the Supreme Leader of Iran responsible for contacts and communications with religious seminaries; and likewise the chief of "Estehlal Headquarters" of the "supreme leader office".

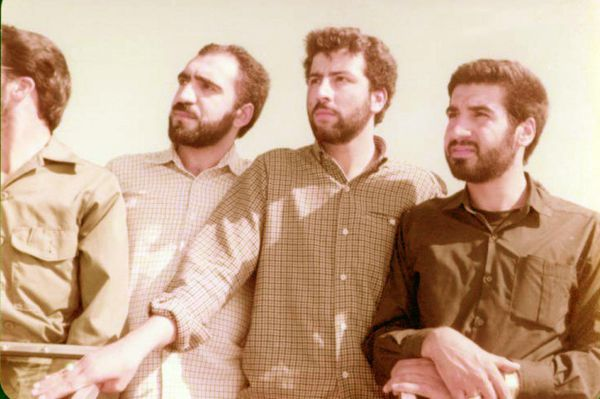
Ebrahim Raisi (middle) and Ahmad Marvi (left) in the 1980s

Marvi has studied fiqh/principles, and has a Ph.D. in "theology and Islamic education"; his teachers included Abolghasem Khazali, Hossein Waheed Khorasani and Mojtaba Tehrani. Marvi who is also known as "Hojjatol-Eslam Marvi" replaced Ebrahim Raisi as the new chief custodian and trustee of the Astan Quds Razavi, (a charitable organization holding trusteeship of "Imam Reza shrine" in Mashhad) by order of Khamenei, on 30 March 2019.

Religious titles
Preceded by Ebrahim Raisi	Custodian of Astan Quds Razavi; 2019–	Succeeded by
