= Ramadan in Australia =

Religious observance in Australia

Ramadan in Australia is a sacred period and the ninth month of the Islamic lunar calendar, observed by Australian Muslims just like other Muslims worldwide. In Australia, a multicultural and multi-faith society this holy month is marked by fasting, prayer, reflection, cultural traditions and community gatherings, reflecting the nation's multicultural fabric.

== Overview ==
Ramadan is a time for spiritual growth, self-discipline, and increased devotion. Muslims abstain from food, drink, and other physical needs from dawn until sunset, focusing on prayer, charity, and community. In Australia, the observance of Ramadan showcases the country's religious diversity and the vibrant traditions of its Muslim communities.

== Dates and moon sighting ==
The start of Ramadan is determined by the sighting of the new moon. For example in 2025, the Australian National Imams Council (ANIC) announced that Ramadan commenced on Saturday, 1 March following the sighting of the crescent moon on 28 February. However, some communities observed the beginning on Sunday, March 2, due to varying moon sighting reports.

Similarly, the Australian Fatwa Council and the Grand Mufti of Australia, Dr. Ibrahim Abu Mohamed, confirmed the start date based on astronomical calculations indicating the moon's visibility for 12 minutes after sunset in Sydney and 16 minutes in Perth.

== Fasting duration and climate ==
Australia's geographical location results in varying fasting durations across the country. During Ramadan, fasting hours can range from approximately 11 to 13 hours, depending on the season and region. The diverse climate also influences the daily routines and practices of fasting individuals.

== Cultural celebrations and community events ==
Ramadan in Australia is celebrated with various cultural and community events. One notable event is the "Lakemba Nights" festival in Sydney, which attracts over a million visitors annually. The festival features food stalls, cultural performances, and communal prayers, reflecting the rich diversity of the Muslim community.

=== Interfaith engagement ===
Ramadan serves as an opportunity for interfaith dialogue and community engagement in Australia. Many mosques and Islamic centers host open iftar events, inviting people of all faiths to learn about Ramadan and share in the communal meal.

== Charitable activities ==
Charity is a fundamental aspect of Ramadan. Australian Muslims engage in various charitable activities, including donating to food banks, supporting refugee communities, and participating in fundraising events. Organizations like Islamic Relief Australia coordinate nationwide efforts to assist those in need during the holy month.

Ramadan also emphasizes Zakat al-Fitr (obligatory charity before Eid) and general donations. Many Australian Islamic organizations run fundraising campaigns for local and global causes, including humanitarian aid to Gaza.
