= Astan Quds Razavi =

Astan-e Quds-e Razavi

- Native name: آستان قدس رضوی
- Type: Bonyad
- Founded: April 11, 1510; 516 years ago
- Founder: Ismail I
- Headquarters: Mashhad, Khorasan Razavi, Iran
- Key people: Ahmad Marvi (Custodian and Chairman of the supervisory board); Mostafa Feyzi (Deputy of Custodian); Seyyed Mehdi Sadidi (Head of Razavi Foundation)
- Website: Official website

Astan Quds Razavi (Persian: آستان قدس رضوی, romanized: Āstān-e Qods-e Razavi) is a bonyad based at Mashhad, Iran. It is the administrative organization which manages the Imam Reza shrine and various institutions which belong to the organization.

The administrative apparatus of Astan Quds Razavi is considered the longest-lasting organization since the martyrdom of Imam Reza about 1200 years ago. The main resource of the institution is endowments. The Astan Quds Razavi is a major player in the economy of the city of Mashhad. The organization by order of Ruhollah Khomeini was tax exempt for 35 years until 2019. Today, Astan Quds Razavi holds vast assets, including land, businesses, and industries.

== Current situation ==
Since the revolution, the Astan-e-Qods the bonyad has grown from a "modest concern" into a conglomerate employing 19,000 people and running "auto plants, agricultural businesses, and many other enterprises"

The land occupied by the shrine has grown fourfold since 1979, according to the head of the foundation's international relations department. The foundation owns most of the real estate in Mashhad and rents out shop space to bazaars and hoteliers.

According to journalist Christopher de Bellaigue, "when asked to identify the most important man in the city, Mashhadis do not name the mayor but rather the head of Astan-e-Qods."

The economic activities of Astan Quds Razavi are managed by the Razavi Foundation (بنیاد رضوی), previously known as the Endowment Productivity Foundation (بنیاد بهره‌وری موقوفات). Formed in 2020 through the merger of the Razavi Economic Organization and related deputy offices (technical and civil, legal, and real estate), it operates with independent authority in the management of assets, endowments, subsidiaries, investments, and sustainable financial resources. It is currently headed by Seyyed Mehdi Sadidi, who was appointed in November 2022.

Ayatollah Abbas Vaez-Tabasi had been the head of Astan-e-Qods from the revolution until his death in 2016. Ebrahim Raisi succeeded him in March 2016 and held office until April 2019. Lastly, the supreme leader of Iran, Seyyed Ali Khamenei appointed Ahmad Marvi as the new chief of this Bonyad instead of Ebrahim Raisi; and Raisi became the Chief Justice of Iran.

== Institutes ==
=== Publications ===
- Behnashr Publishing
- Quds Daily
- Za'ir Magazine
- Haram Magazine
- Printing and Publication Organization

=== Cultural and educational institute ===
- Imam Reza (A.S.) University
- Islamic Research Foundation
- Youth Counseling Services and Social Research Institute
- Razavi Cultural Foundation
- Artistic Creativity and Audio-Visual Media Institution
- Astan Quds Razavi Central Museum
- Malek Library and National Museum
- The Dar-ul-Quran of the Astan Quds Razavi
- The Central Museum of Astan Quds Razavi
- Supreme Cultural Council
- Central Library of Astan Quds Razavi
- Razavi University of Islamic Sciences
- Islamic Propagation and Relations Directorate
- International Relations Office
- On Duty Education Centre for the Employees of the Astan Quds Razavi

=== Economic institutes ===
- Razavi Foundation (بنیاد رضوی; formerly Endowment Productivity Foundation / Razavi Economic Organization)
- Behnashr Company
- Carpet Company
- Insurance Company
- Canning and Cold-Storage Company
- Kenebist Farm
- Housing and Construction Company
- Flour Company
- Samen Pharmaceutical Company
- Bread Manufacturing Industry
- Wood Industry
- Dairy Products Company
- Behnashr Publishing Company
- Orchards Organization
- The Agricultural Units of the Astan Quds Razavi
- The Industrial and Mines, Development and Services Units of the Astan Quds Razavi
- Razavi Brokerage Company
- Razavi Transport Company

=== Health care institutes ===
- Physical Training Organization of the Astan Quds Razavi
- Medical Services
- Pharmacy Institute
- Razavi Super-Specialization Hospital

=== Construction ===
- Expanding the Sacred Places of Astan Quds Razavi

=== Social institute ===
- Social Welfare Affairs related to the pilgrims of the Holy Shrine of Imam Reza(A.S.)
- Welfare Institutions and Services of the Astan Quds Razavi
- Astan Quds Razavi Sports Complex, Mashhad, Iran

=== Other related institutes ===
- International Congress on Imam Reza (A.S.)
- Ayatollah Abbas Vaez Tabasi, Reverend Custodian of Astan Quds Razavi

== See also ==
- Bonyad
- Imam Reza
- Imam Reza shrine
- Goharshad Mosque
- Economy of Iran
