= Moon sighting in Islam =

Sighting the crescent of the new moon

Moon sighting (Arabic: رؤية الهلال) refers to the act of observing a new crescent moon and is one of the ways to determine the beginning of a lunar month. On the Islamic calendar, a month begins with the first sighting of the crescent moon, involving astronomy in Islamic events and festivals, including Ramadan and Eid al-Fitr.

== Procedure ==
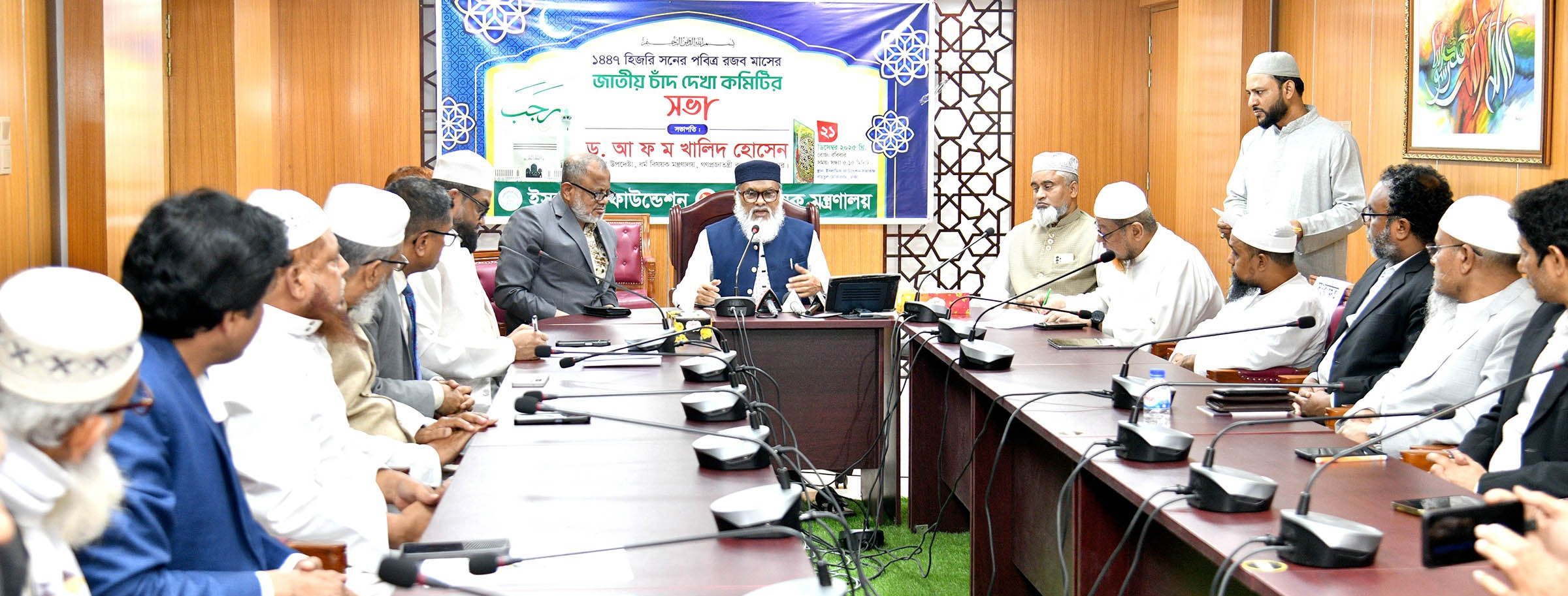
National Moon Sighting Committee meeting for Rajab 1447 Hijri in Dhaka presided by Religious Affairs Minister AFM Khaled Hossain.

=== United Kingdom ===
Whilst Muslim Majority nations usually have a government affiliated department, In the United Kingdom. It is often private organisations that provide announcements to the Muslim Community. The leading organisation in the UK is the New Crescent Society which works with various Government subsidiaries such as the Royal Observatory Greenwich, The Mayor Of London/London City Gov, The London Eye, HM almanac Office and many more.

=== Iran ===
The Estehlal Headquarters is the organization and command post based in Iran deploys groups to monitor the sky and identify the crescent of the Moon as per the Islamic tradition of Estehlal. This marks the first day of each month on the lunar calendar. Estehlal Headquarters was established by the decree of Iran's supreme leader, Seyyed Ali Khamenei, to regulate the practice of Estehlal. The Center consists of 150 groups with 700 members.

=== Saudi Arabia ===
The Supreme Court of Saudi Arabia has called on all moon sighters across the Kingdom to participate in sighting the new moon, whether with the naked eye or through binoculars. The Supreme Court of Saudi Arabia requested those who observe a crescent moon approach the nearest court and provide their testimony to assist the court in determining the beginning of Ramadan.

== See also ==
- Islamic calendar
- Eid al-Fitr
- Rosh Chodesh
- Noumenia
- New moon
- Lunar phase
