= Flag of Iran =

Islamic Republic of Iran
- Use: National flag and ensign
- Proportion: 4:7 (de jure; see below)
- Adopted: 7 October 1907; 119 years ago (original version); July 1980; 46 years ago (current version, representing the Islamic Republic)
- Design: A horizontal tricolour of green, white, and red with the Islamic emblem in red centred on the white band and the Arabic Takbir written in white Kufic script, repeated along the edges of the green and red band.
- Designed by: Hamid Nadimi

The national flag of the Islamic Republic of Iran is a tricolour of equal horizontal bands of green, white, and red, featuring the Islamic emblem (Note: Persian: نشان ملی, romanised: Nishân Rasmi, lit. 'Formal emblem') in red centred on the white band, and the Takbir written 11 times each in white Kufic script along the edges of the green and red bands.

The first official flag of Iran was adopted on 14 August 1905. Following the 1979 Islamic Revolution, the Iranian flag was changed into its current form in July 1980.

Many Iranian opposition groups opposed to the Islamic government use either the Lion and Sun flag or the green-white-red tricolour without additional emblems. Neither variant is officially recognised by the government, with the Lion and Sun flag strictly banned from public use.

== Flag description ==
=== Symbolism ===
The Islamic emblem consists of four crescents and a sword, surmounted by a shaddah, representing the Arabic word Allah (الله). The Arabic Takbir is repeated 11 times along the edges of the green and red bands respectively, for a total of 22 times, reminiscent of 22 Bahman. The flag's colours — green, white, and red — are the pan-Iranian colours, historically associated with the nation and its identity. The flags of Tajikistan, Kurdistan, and formerly Afghanistan share the same colours.

=== Construction ===
Physical requirements for the Iranian flag, a simple construction sheet, and a compass-and-straightedge construction for the emblem and the Takbir are described in the national Iranian standard ISIRI 1.

== History ==
=== Prehistory ===
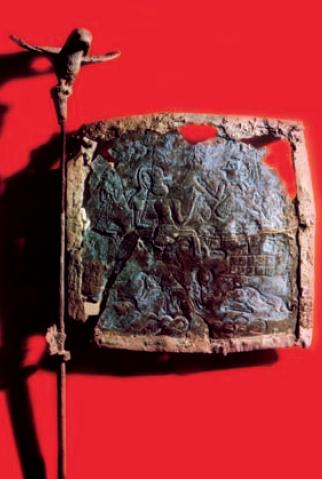
Shahdad Standard, ancient bronze flag found at Shahdad, c. 2400 BC. This flag is one of the oldest in human history.

The oldest flag found in Iran is the Bronze Age Shahdad Standard, found in Shahdad, Kerman province, dating back to c. 2400 BCE, made of bronze. It features a seated man and a kneeling woman facing each other, with a star in between. This iconography can be found in other Bronze Age pieces of art in the area as well.

=== Achaemenid Empire ===
The Old Persian word for "banner, standard" was drafša- (Avestan drafša-, Middle Persian drafš, cognate with Sanskrit drapsá-). Xenophon in Cyropaedia (7.1.4) describes the standard of Artaxerxes II at Cunaxa as "a golden eagle, with outspread wings, borne aloft on a long spear-shaft", the same banner recorded to be used by Cyrus the Great.

According to Herodotus (9.59), each Persian army division had its own standard, and "all officers had banners over their tents" (Xenophon, 8.5.13). One such banner, a square plaque in saltire, is depicted on a Greek vase, the so-called "Douris cup" held by the Louvre. A similar design is known from an Urartian bronze disk from Altıntepe. Similar square plaques on poles are known from six of the audience scenes of the Throne Hall relief at Persepolis. The Alexander Mosaic of Pompeii, a Roman-era copy of a Hellenistic painting dated c. 320 BCE, also shows the royal Persian standard., depicted as a rectangular plaque, possibly originally in purple, with a dark red border with yellow dots. In the field, a golden bird is only partially preserved. The "royal falcon" of Persia (varəγna) represented farr 'glory', while the eagle was associated with the Achaemenid dynasty itself.

A square tile representing a miniature (12 cm^{2}) banner was discovered at Persepolis in 1948. The tile is made of Egyptian blue frit and likely represents Ancient Egyptian Horus, but in the Persian context suggests local association with the Avestan varəγna or the royal eagle of the Achaemenids.

=== Sasanian Empire ===
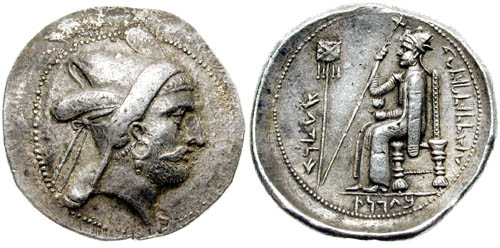
Derafsh Kaviani appearing in a coin of a local Persian dynasty that arose near Persepolis during the Seleucid era.

=== Seljuk Empire ===
Various emblems and banners have been recorded to be used by the Seljuks in different periods. Early Seljuks were using their traditional emblems, but they gradually adopted local Muslim emblems and banners. The official flag of the empire was most probably a black flag, similar to the flag of the Abbasid Caliphate. The flag was decorated with emblems, which were either superimposed over it or was placed above the flag. This black flag was traditionally presented to the Seljuk sovereigns by the Abbasid caliphs.

A yellow flag was also used to denote Seljuk sovereignty over a town.

=== Ghaznavid dynasty ===
The Turkic Ghaznavid dynasty were invested in promoting Iranian culture. They are known to have displayed a number of heraldic emblems that harked back to pre-Islamic Iran, including the Sun and Lion motif, as well as the Griffin motif. Their banners appear to have shown chequered motifs.

=== Safavid Empire ===
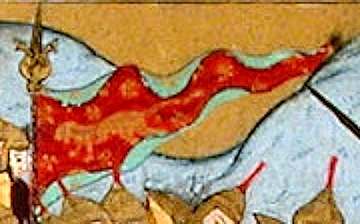
Safavid flag in the Siege of Shamakhi, 1578. Secaatname (1586)

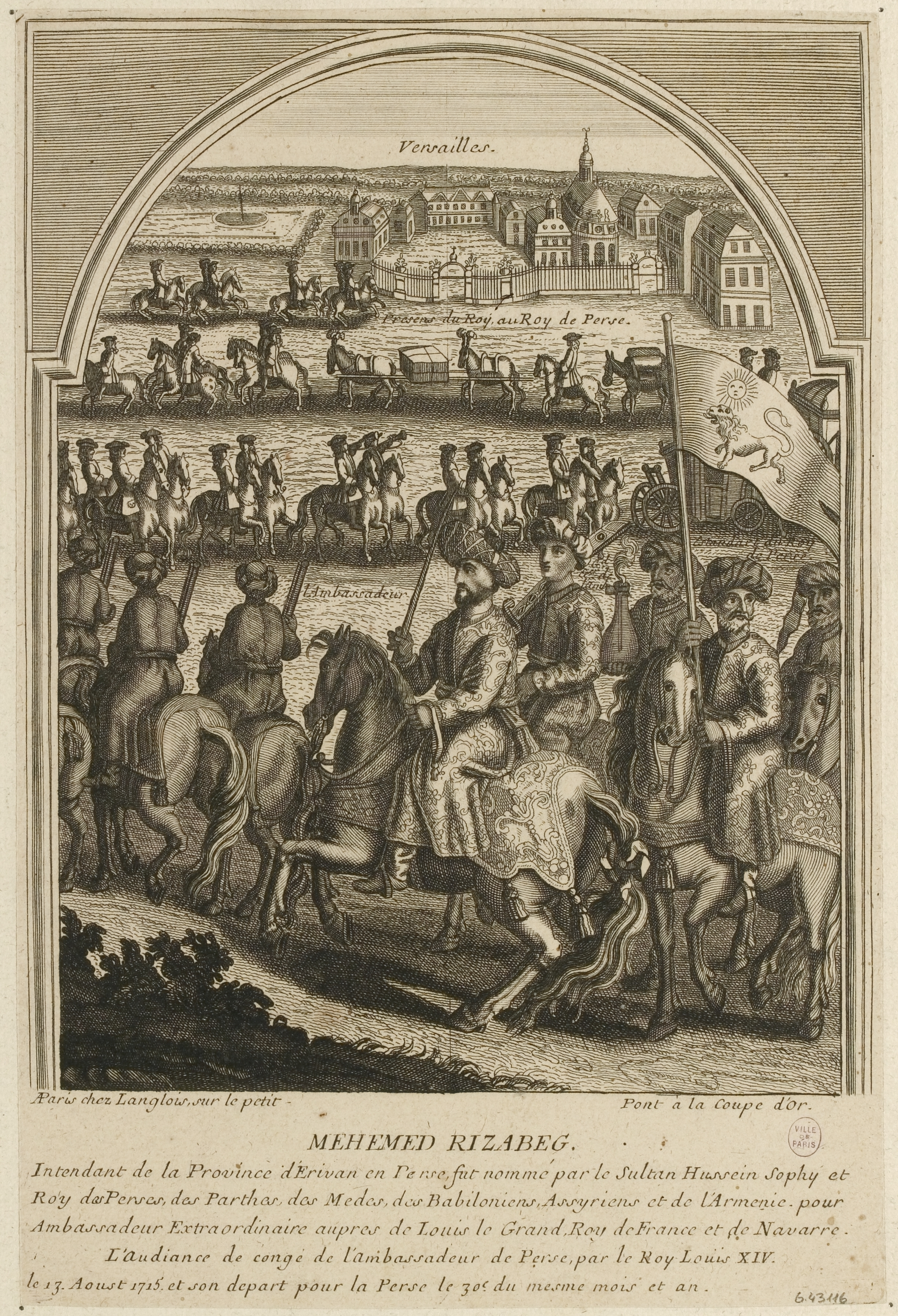
Flag of Iran carried by the Persian delegation during Mohammad Reza Beg's visit to Versailles, August 1715

By the time the Safavids created a unified state and promoted Shiʿism as the national creed, the lion and sun had become a familiar sign everywhere—on copper coins, on banners, and on artworks. although various ʿalams and banners were employed by the Safavids, the lion and sun symbol had become by the time of Shah Abbas the recognised emblem of Iran. The association may originally have been based on a learned interpretation of the Shahnameh's references to "the Sun of Iran" and "the Moon of the Turanians/Turks." As noted earlier, the Sasanians had called their king “the Sun of the East” and the Roman emperor "the Moon of the West." The evidence of the Shahnameh was certainly well known to the Safavid shahs. Since the crescent moon had been adopted as the dynastic and ultimately national emblem of the Ottoman sultans, who were the new sovereigns of “Rūm,” the Safavids of Persia, needing to have a dynastic and national emblem of their own, chose the lion and sun motif.

=== Afsharid era ===
Nader Shah consciously avoided the using the colour green, as green was associated with Shia Islam and the Safavid dynasty.

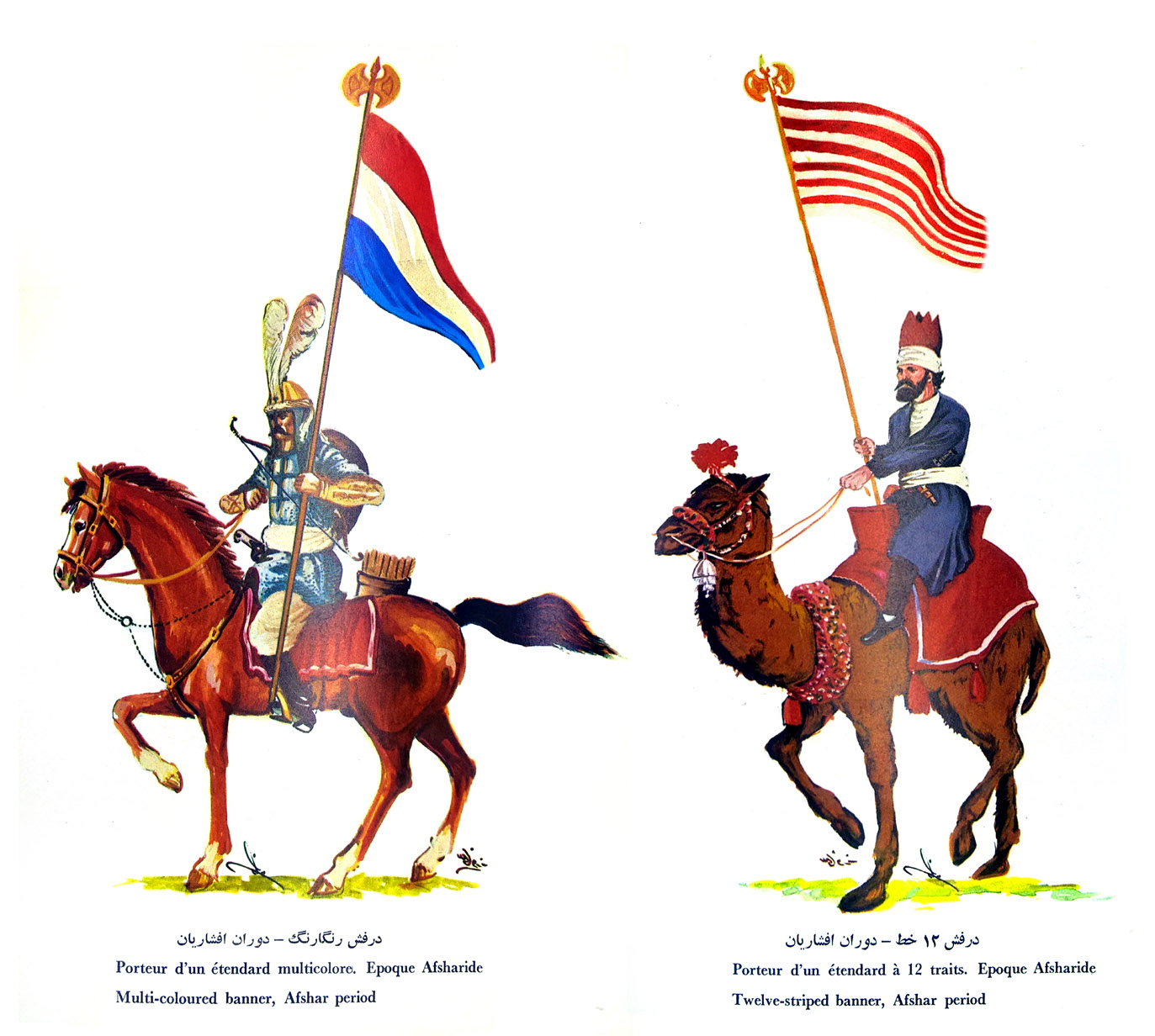
Imperial Standards of the Afsharid dynasty

The two imperial standards were placed on the right of the square already mentioned: one of them was in stripes of red, blue, and white, and the other of red, blue, white, and yellow, without any other ornament: though the old standards required 12 men to move them, the shah lengthened their staffs, and made them yet heavier; he also put new colours of silk upon them, the one red and yellow striped, the other yellow edged with red: they were made of such an enormous size, to prevent their being carried off by the enemy, except by an entire defeat. The regimental colours were a narrow slip of silk, sloped to a point, some were red, some white, and some striped.

Navy Admiral flag being a white ground with a red Persian Sword in the middle.

==== Flags ====
An Imperial Standard of the Afsharid dynasty

Another Imperial Standard of the Afsharid dynasty

Nader Shah's flag

Naval flag of the Afsharid dynasty

=== Zand era ===
The state flag of Zand Iran was a white triangular pennant with a green border and a gold lion and sun in the centre. Another version shown below included the same design but with green and red.

==== Flags ====
Flag of the Zand dynasty

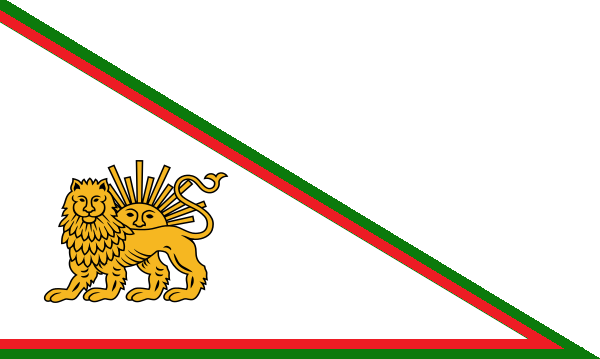
Another Flag of the Zand dynasty

The "Ya Karim" flag, which was a pun on Karim Khan Zand's name, and Al-Karim (the generous), which is one of the names of God in Islam

=== Early Qajar era ===
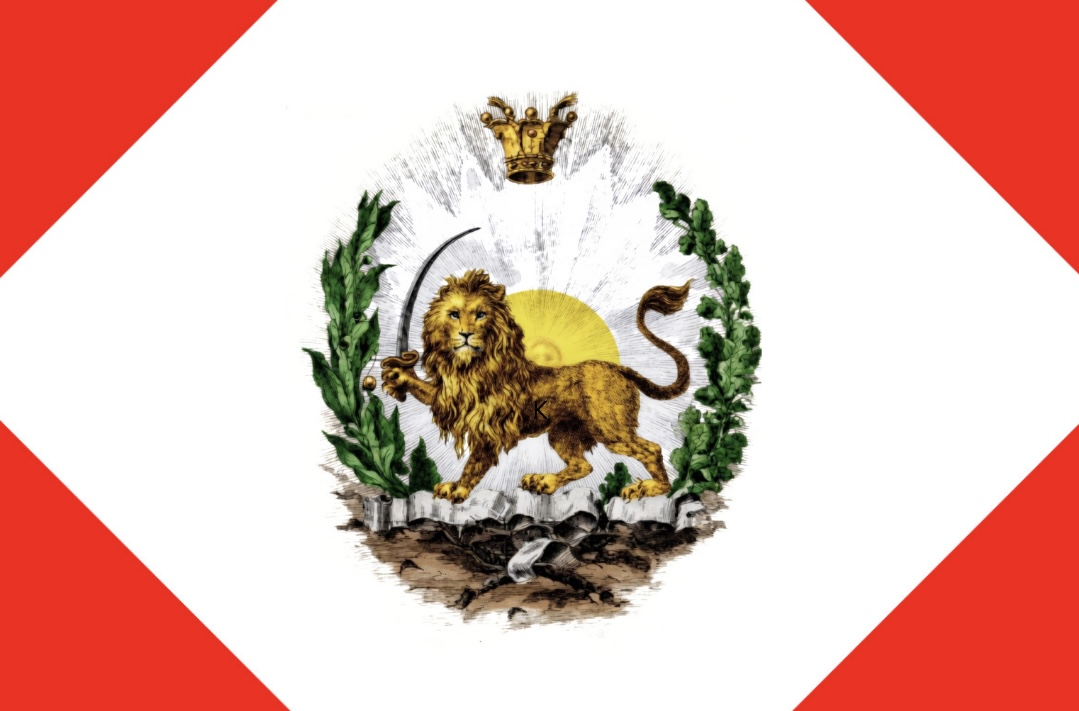
Imperial Standard of Iran from 1834 until 1906

Few sources directly describe the national flag during Agha Mohammad Khan Qajar's reign. Gholam Hossein Afzal ol-Molk refers to the Beyraq Qapuq ('execution flag') of the Naserid period as originating from Agha Mohammad Khan's time. This pennon flag is red and displays the lion and sun motif with a sword, although it is unlikely that the emblem resembled that of Agha Mohammad Khan's time given the sword-less design on the coins of this era. Several modern sources attribute a square flag with a red background and a pale yellow circle in the center, featuring a lion and a sun motif with a sword, to the period of Agha Mohammad Khan. The only visible source for this design is an unidentified portrait of Agha Mohammad Khan, where such a banner is present next to him. This painting was featured on the cover of the 1992 book Les Rois oubliés: L'épopée de la dynasty Kadjare, by Ali Mirza Qajar (grandson of Mohammad Ali Shah Qajar). Moreover, the painting was also photographed at a Qajar family gathering at Chateau de Bonmont, Cheserex, Switzerland in 2003.

In contradistinction, various contemporary and modern sources provide more detailed descriptions of Iranian flags and the development of the lion and sun motif during Fath-Ali Shah Qajar's rule, particularly in military contexts. Colonel Gaspard Drouville, a French officer who served as a military instructor for the Iranian government after the signing of the Treaty of Finckenstein, authored a two-volume travelogue that offers additional information on Iranian flags and standards.

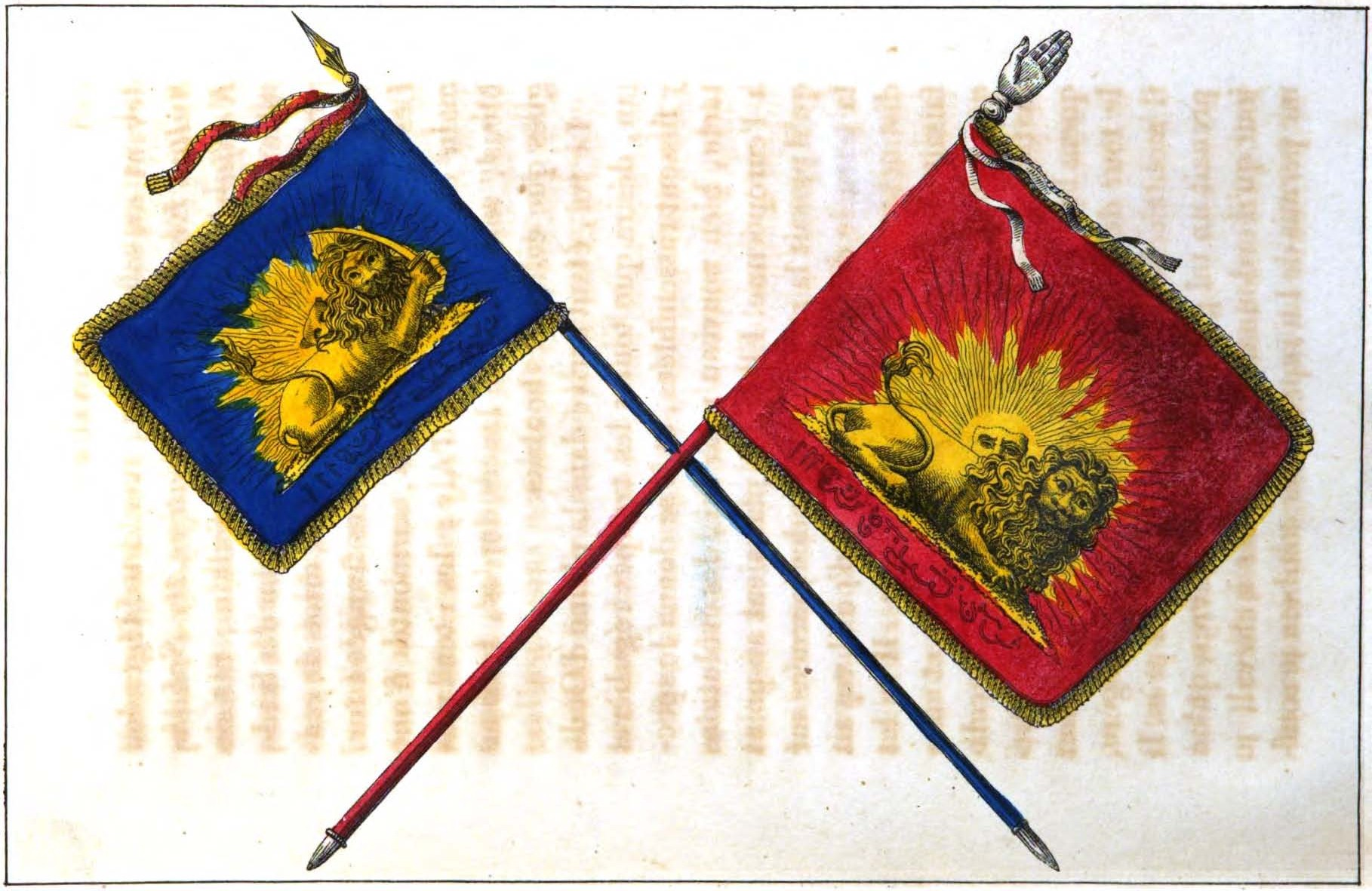
The illustration from Drouville's Voyage en Perse depicts the smaller cavalry flag (left) and the larger infantry flag (right).

Drouville expounds that in 1813, Fath-Ali Shah Qajar and Abbas Mirza attended a royal inspection of the regular infantry in Azarbaijan to personally confer each standard to their respective corps. These flags included the lion and sun motif, a date or number pertaining to the unit, and the inscription: "Sultan ibn Sultan Fath-Ali Shah Qajar" (Sultan son of Sultan Fath-Ali Shah Qajar), in reference to Abbas Mirza's title. The flags and standards are further described as similar to those of the French, adorned with taffeta white streamers and golden fringes. Based on Drouville's illustration, the larger flags of the regular infantry were painted red, and the flagpole was crowned by the silver Hand of Ali. The smaller standards that were prescribed to the cavalry lancers were a deep blue and featured a crouching lion brandishing a curved sword before a setting sun. These standards were topped by golden spears that were "as sharp as those of the Houlans".

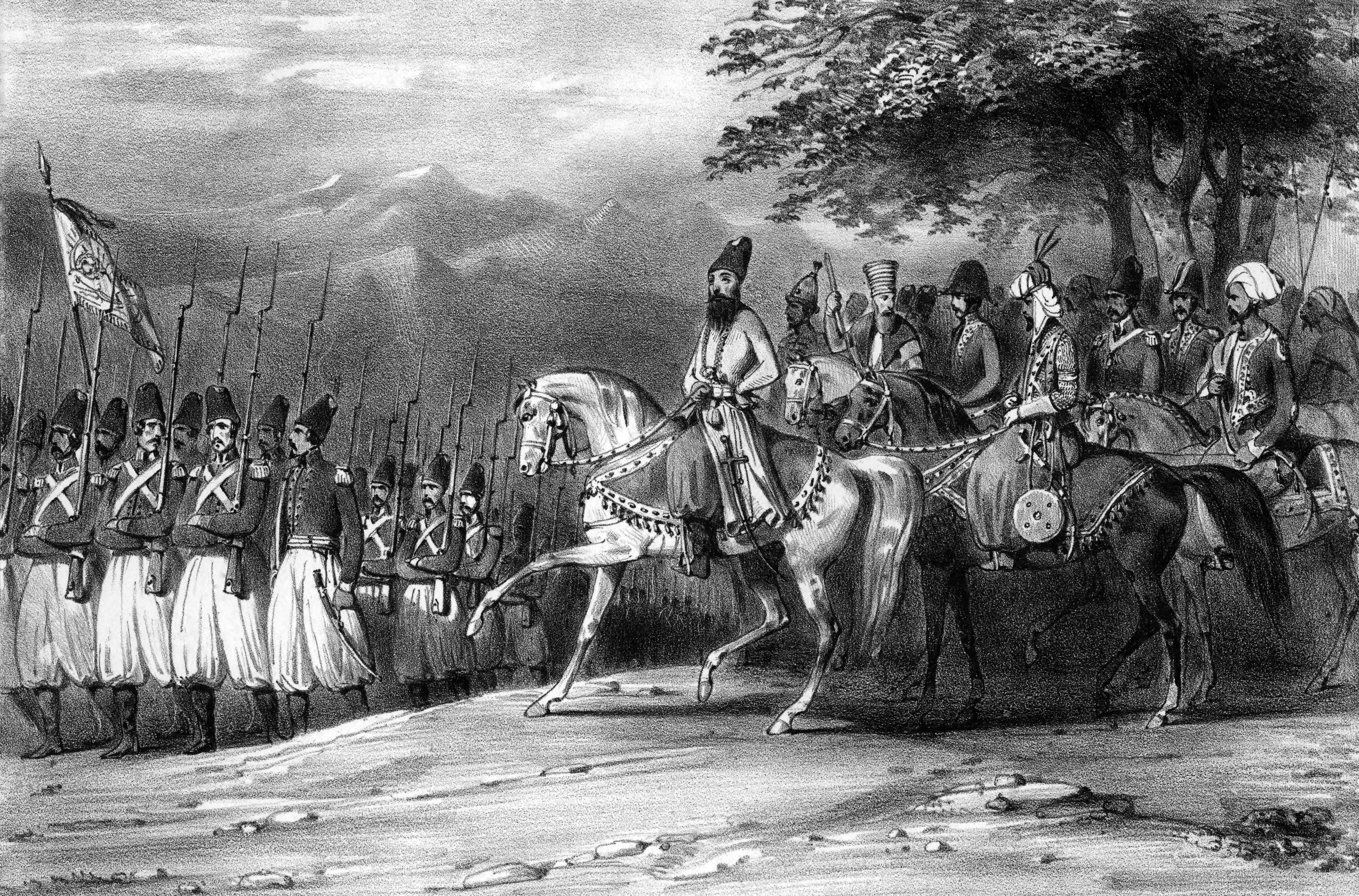
Illustration published by Lemercier & Cie, captioned: une revue d Abbas-Mirza, Ser-Bâz (Infanterie régulière).

An illustration by the French battle painter Hippolyte Bellangé depicts Abbas Mirza reviewing Iranian regular troops. The infantry corps carries a standard with a spearhead finial bearing a couchant lion and sun with a sword, similar to the cavalry flag of the Nezam lancers depicted by Drouville. However, as the work dates to 1835, two years after Abbas Mirza's death, the flag's design may be an artistic oversight.

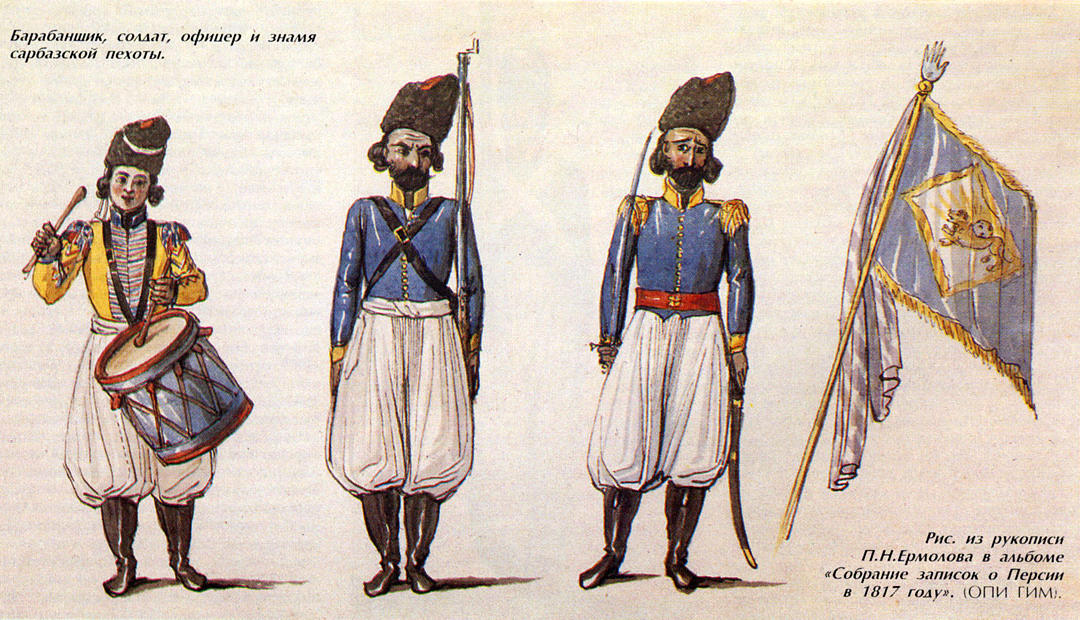
Sketch of a Qajar military drummer, infantryman and officer, including a sarbaz infantry banner from Yermolov's Collection of Notes on Persia in 1817.

In his accounts of the Russo-Persian war, Captain Yermolov, the Russian commander-in-chief in the Caucasus, documented the Iranian military in detail. One excerpt from his notes provides a vivid portrayal of a Nezam drummer, soldier, and officer carrying a Sarbaz infantry military banner dated to 1817. This banner, which shares many similarities with contemporary European regimental flags, features a lion and sun motif devoid of a sword within a white lozenge accented by a golden border. The light blue banner boasts a flagpole crowned by the silver Hand of Ali.

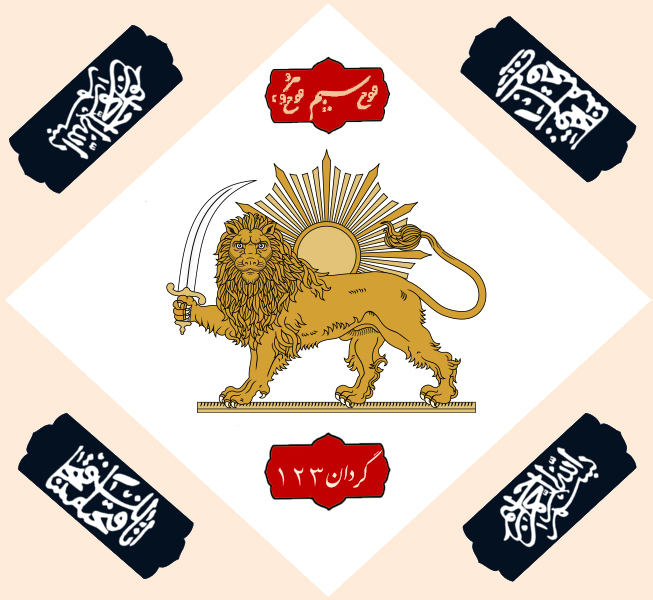
Recreation of the regimental standards carried by the Qajar infantry corps in the painting of the Battle of Sultanabad at the Hermitage Museum.

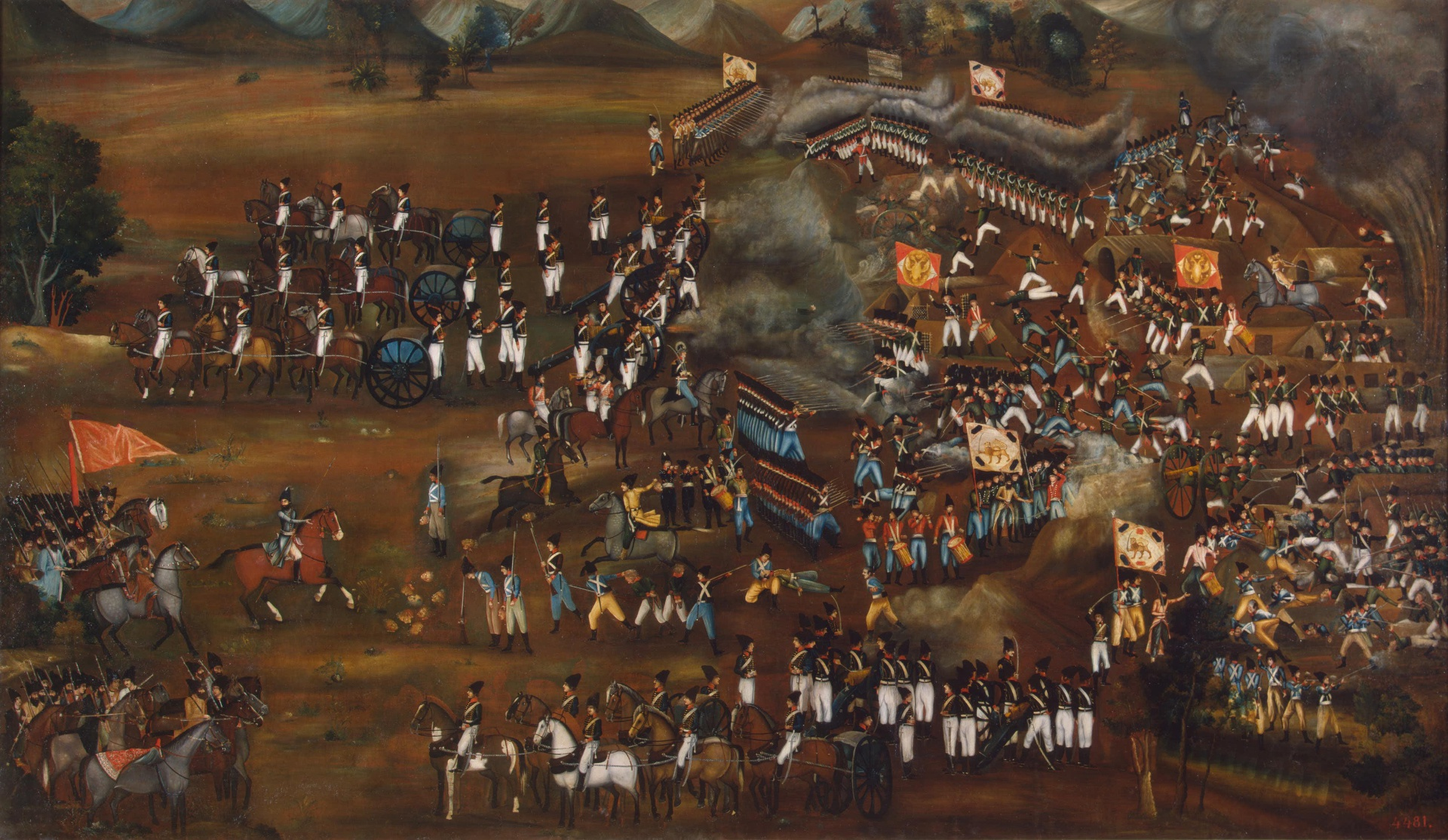
A painting of the Iranian victory at the Battle of Sultanabad displaying the Napoleonic-style military banners held by the sarbaz infantry corps.

A painting, believed to be the work of Allahverdi Afshar between 1814 and 1817, which adorned the walls of Abbas Mirza's Ojan castle portrays the Iranian triumph at the Battle of Sultanabad on 13 February 1812. The painting exhibits Persian troops carrying banners of Napoleonic style, featuring the passant lion and sun equipped with a sword.

No contemporary sources have made any other indications of a sword wielded by the lion until the reign of Mohammad Shah. Nonetheless, this illustration provides valuable insight into the evolution of the emblem and its use on Iranian flags during the Qajar period. However, Zoka mentions the inscription of a coin from the Urmia mint, dated 1833 (1249 AH), in which a couchant lion is depicted holding a sword. According to Zoka, these sources prove that the earliest representation of the sword-wielding lion and sun pre-dates the reign of Mohammad Shah and was likely institutionalised in the latter years of Fath-Ali Shah's reign.

During Fath-Ali Shah's reign, the state flag and other flags adopted by the Iranian government purportedly opted for square or rectangular shapes over the pennon flags commonly used in earlier eras. Another distinction noted in the designs of the lion and sun depicted on coins and flags of Fath-Ali Shah's era relative to those of prior years is the appearance of the lion. Before the middle of Fath-Ali Shah's reign, a Persian lion, which is maneless and smaller in stature was prominent, whereas later depictions evolved to an African lion. Towards the end of Fath-Ali Shah's reign the two common symbols of the Qajar empire were combined to include the Zulfiqar and the lion and sun in the official flag.

While there is little evidence, several modern sources state that Fath-Ali Shah adopted three different state flags; a plain red flag with a couchant lion and sun motif as the war flag, a plain white flag with a couchant lion and sun for diplomatic purposes, and a green flag with a lion passant in front of the setting sun, wielding a sword during peacetime.

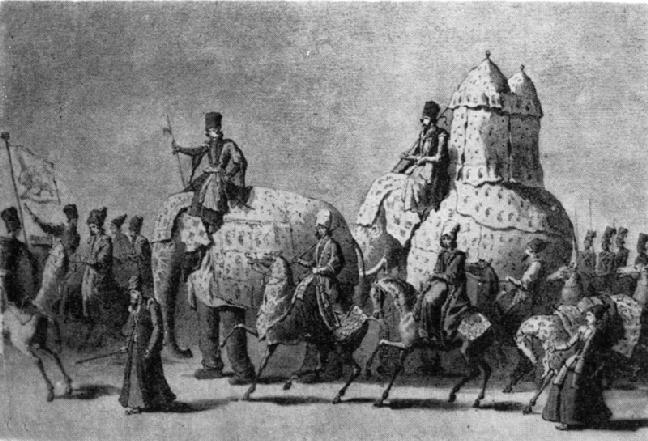
Painting of the Iranian delegation to St. Petersburg. The standard-bearer is holding a white lion and sun flag, in which the lion is wielding a curved sword.

Alexis Soltykoff's Voyage en Perse includes an illustration depicting a standing lion wielding a sword. The painting is titled Entrée de l'ambassade de Perse a St. Petersbourg ('Entrance of the Persian Embassy to St. Petersburg') and shows the arrival of Mirza Abolhassan Khan Ilchi, then the Iranian ambassador to Russia, in 1838. The image features a Persian standard-bearer holding a rectangular flag with a lion passant, holding a curved sword in front of the setting sun. Atop the flagpole is the Hand of Ali finial. The painting was included in Soltykoff's book, which was published in 1851, several years after the events it depicts.

French orientalist Louis Dupeux stated that one of the privileges enjoyed by the Shah of Iran was the right to "raise" several flags. Dubeux suggests that Mohammad Shah had two flags. He describes one of these flags as displaying the Zulfiqar while the other depicted a couchant lion and sun motif.

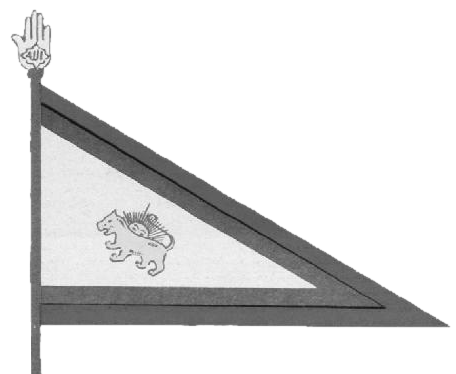
The triangular banner of Mohammad Shah from the painting depicting the Battle of Ghurian.

While Iranian flags and military banners were largely uniform and similar in design by Mohammad Shah's reign, Ahmad Naqash's 1860 oil painting depicting the successful Iranian siege of the fort of Ghurian in 1837 serves as a contradictory source of information. Several noteworthy discrepancies arise. Firstly, the use of pennon banners is unusual as square and rectangular flags were more prominently used in Iran and adopted by the military at that time. Secondly, the sword-less lion and sun motif depicted in the painting is outdated. Thirdly, the white and green colour combination contradicts contemporary literature describing military banners and standards as being red or blue. According to Zoka, the painter may have relied on local designs as the work likely originated from Isfahan or Shiraz, where forts in the provinces often raised flags different from those in Tehran. Zoka also suggests that the Herat expedition's army could have reused dated standards predating the new designs.

During the reign of Naser al-Din Shah Qajar, The flag of Mohammad Shah Qajar It remained in use until 1896, When a white flag with green borders and a lion and emblem in the centre was created. There was also a naval ensign which had a red and green border and a civil ensign which looked the same as the naval ensign but without the lion and sun in the middle.

==== Flags ====
Flag of Mohammad Khan

War flag of Fat′h Ali Shah

Diplomatic flag of Fat′h Ali Shah

Peace flag of Fat′h Ali Shah (version with sword)

Flag used during the reign of Mohammad Shah and Naser al-din Shah qajar

Tricolour flag designed by Amir Kabir, State flag 1848–1852

State flag 1896–1907

Civil ensign until 1906

Naval ensign until 1906

Tricolour flag reported in 1886

=== Post-Constitutional Revolution ===
The first version of the modern Iranian tricolour was adopted during the Iranian Constitutional Revolution in the 14 August 1905 constitution. The Supplementary Fundamental Laws of 7 October 1907 described the flag as a tricolour of green, white, and red, with a lion and sun emblem in the middle. A decree dated 4 September 1910 specified the exact details of the emblem, including the shape of the lion's tail and the position and the size of the lion, the sword, and the sun.

During this period, the colours of the flag were very pale, with the red appearing closer to pink in practice. There were three variants of the flag in use. The state flag was a tricolour with the lion and sun emblem in the centre. The national flag and civil ensign was a plain tricolour with no emblem, similar to an inverted Hungarian flag (post-1957). The naval ensign and war flag was similar to the state flag, but the emblem was surrounded by a wreath and surmounted by a crown. All three flags had a 1:3 ratio.

The flag was modified twice during the Pahlavi era. In 1933, the colours of the flag were darkened and the design of the emblem was changed. The sun's facial features were removed and the Kiani Crown on the naval ensign was replaced with the Pahlavi Crown. In 1964, the ratio was changed from 1:3 to 4:7 and the emblem on the naval ensign was shrunk to fit entirely within the white stripe.

Following the Iranian Revolution, the Interim Government of Iran removed the crown from the naval ensign. The old state and national flags remained unchanged until July 1980, when the modern Iranian flag was adopted.

However, the post-revolutionary Iranian government had viewed the Lion and Sun symbol as representing the "oppressive Westernising monarchy" that had to be replaced, despite the emblem's traditional Shi'a meanings and the lion's association with Ali, the first Imam of the Shi'a. For that reason, the name of the Red Lion and Sun Society was changed to Red Crescent Society.

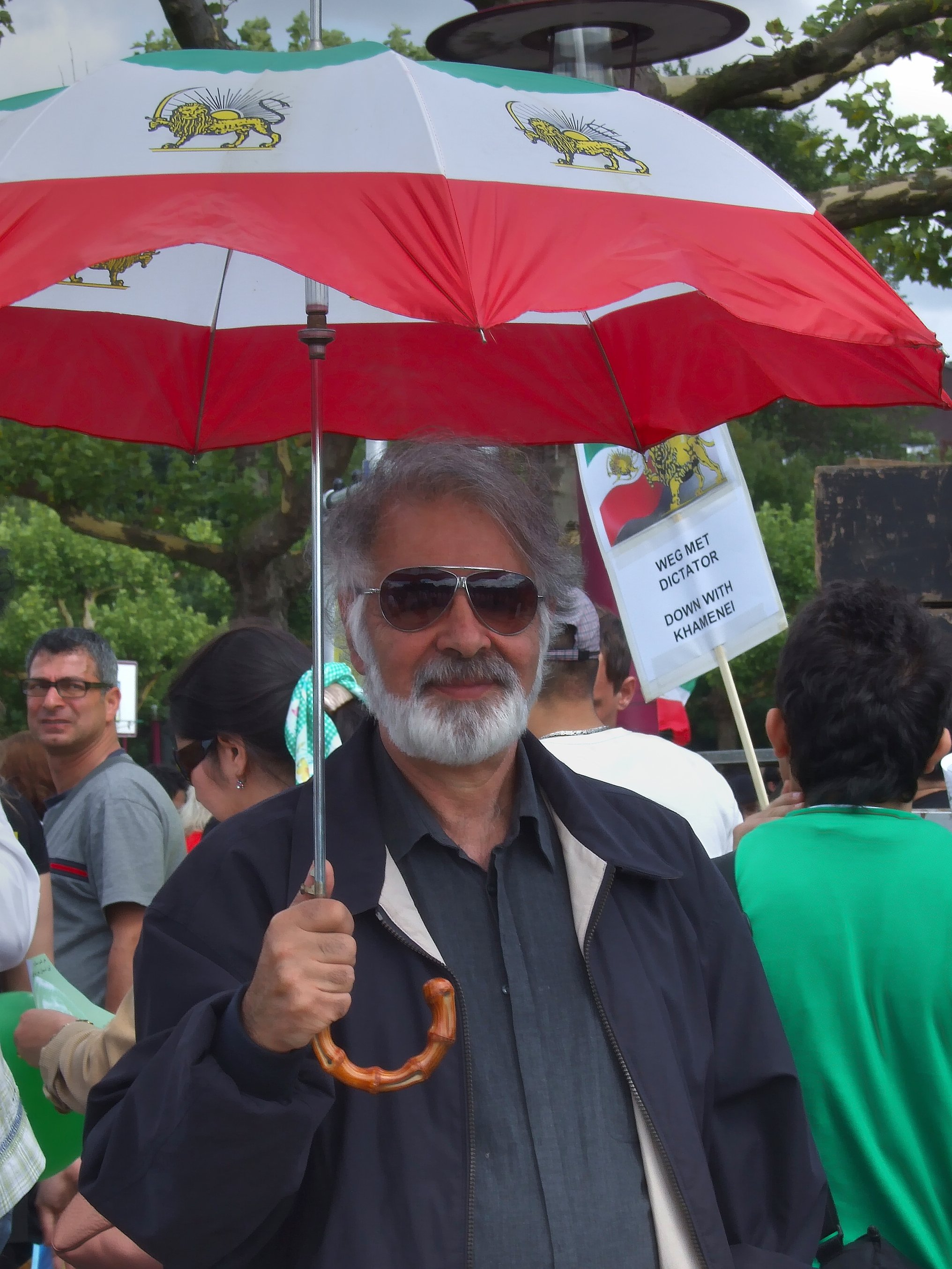
A man carrying an umbrella with a Lion and Sun flag design. Many members of the Iranian opposition and diaspora have continued to use the Lion and Sun flag post-revolution.

Currently, the Lion and Sun flag is used by many Iranian opposition groups as a protest against the Islamic Republic. Some political groups in Iran, including monarchists, continue to use it as well. In Los Angeles, California and other cities with large Iranian expatriate communities, the Lion and Sun, as a distinguishing marker, appears on Iranian flags and souvenirs to an extent that far surpasses its display during the years of monarchy in its homeland, where the plain tricolour was usually used even prior to the revolution. After the Islamic Revolution in Iran and the replacement of the lion and sun flag with the new flag, new designs of this flag were still presented.

4:7 Civil flag of the Imperial State of Iran

4:7 State flag of the Imperial State of Iran (On 14 February 1959, the civilian use of the Lion and Sun flag was approved under a government regulation.)

4:7 War flag of the Imperial State of Iran (the 1970's design, the wreath was redesigned based on a government stamp and the orientation of the wreath and crown in older versions of the war flag)

== Historical flags ==
Below is a list of the flags of Iran from 1736 onwards. All historical designs are modern vector reconstructions.

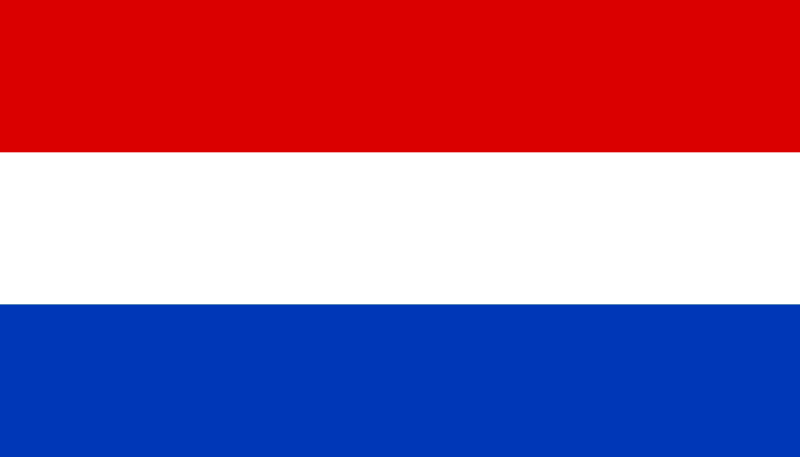
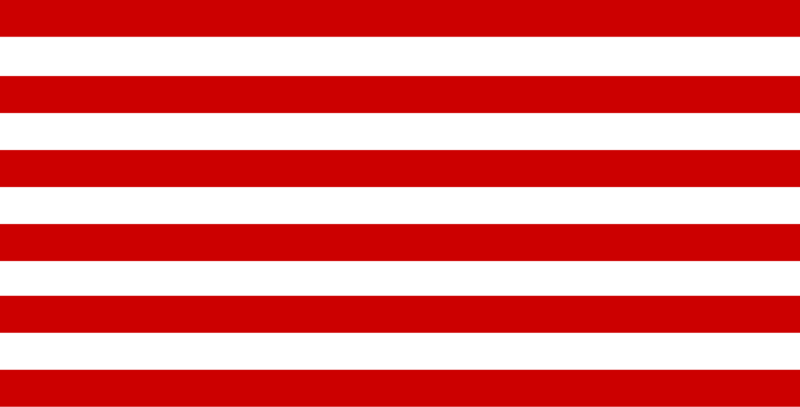
| Years in use | Naval ensign | Civil flag | State flag |
|---|---|---|---|
| 1736–1747 | Naval flag of Nader Shah (1736–1747) | Diplomatic flag of Nader Shah (1736–1747) | War flag of Nader Shah (1736–1747) |
| 1797–1834 | War flag of Fat'h Ali Shah Qajar (1797–1834) | Peace flag of Fat'h Ali Shah Qajar (1797–1834) | Diplomatic flag of Fat'h Ali Shah Qajar (1797–1834) |
| 1834–1896 | | | Flag used during the reign of Mohammad Shah Qajar and Naser al-Din Shah Qajar |
| 1848–1852 | | | State flag (1848–1852) |
| 1852–1906 | Naval ensign (1852–1906) | | State flag (1896–1906) |
| 1906–1933 | Naval ensign (1906–1933 (Note: 1906–1907, 1910–1933)) | Civil flag (1906–1933) | State flag (1906–1933) |
| 1933–1964 | Naval ensign (1933–1964) | Civil flag (1933–1964) | State flag (1933–1964) |
| 1964–1979 | Naval ensign (1964–1979) | Civil flag (1964–1980) | State flag (1964-1979) |
| 1979–1980 | Naval ensign (1979–1980) | Civil flag (1964–1980) | State flag (1980) |
| 1980–present | Naval ensign (1980–present) | Civil flag (1980–present) | State flag (1980–present) |

== Gallery ==
Islamic Republic of Iran flag

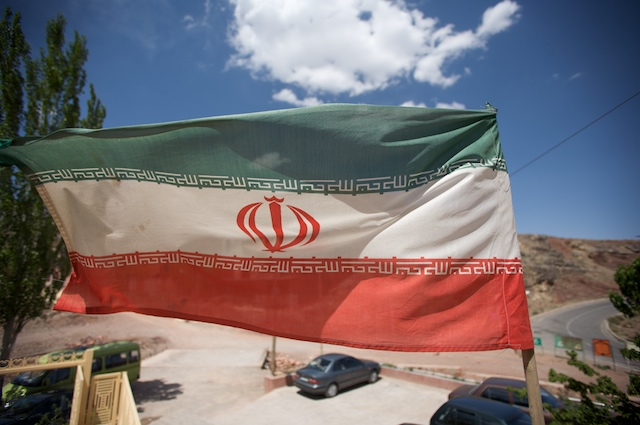
Flag in Abyaneh, Isfahan province

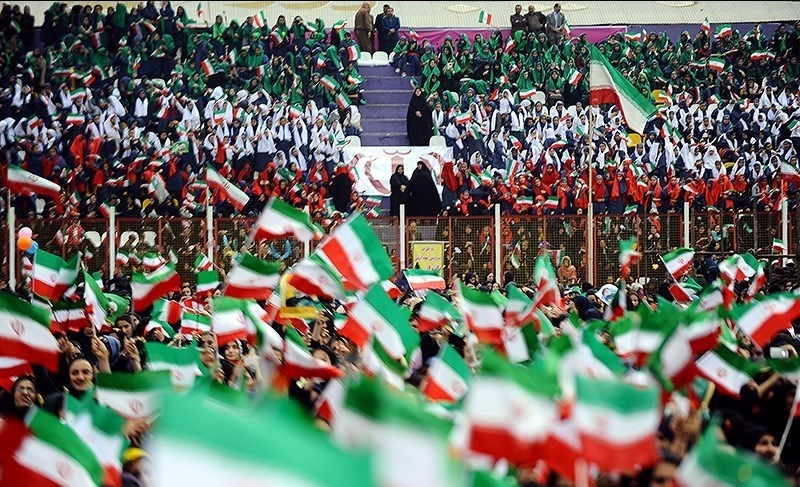
Supporters of Hassan Rouhani waving flags

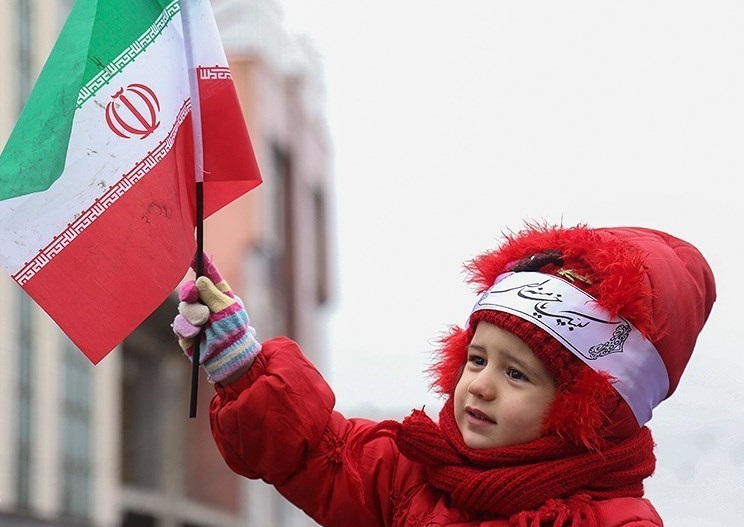
Child with the flag during the 38th anniversary of the Islamic Revolution

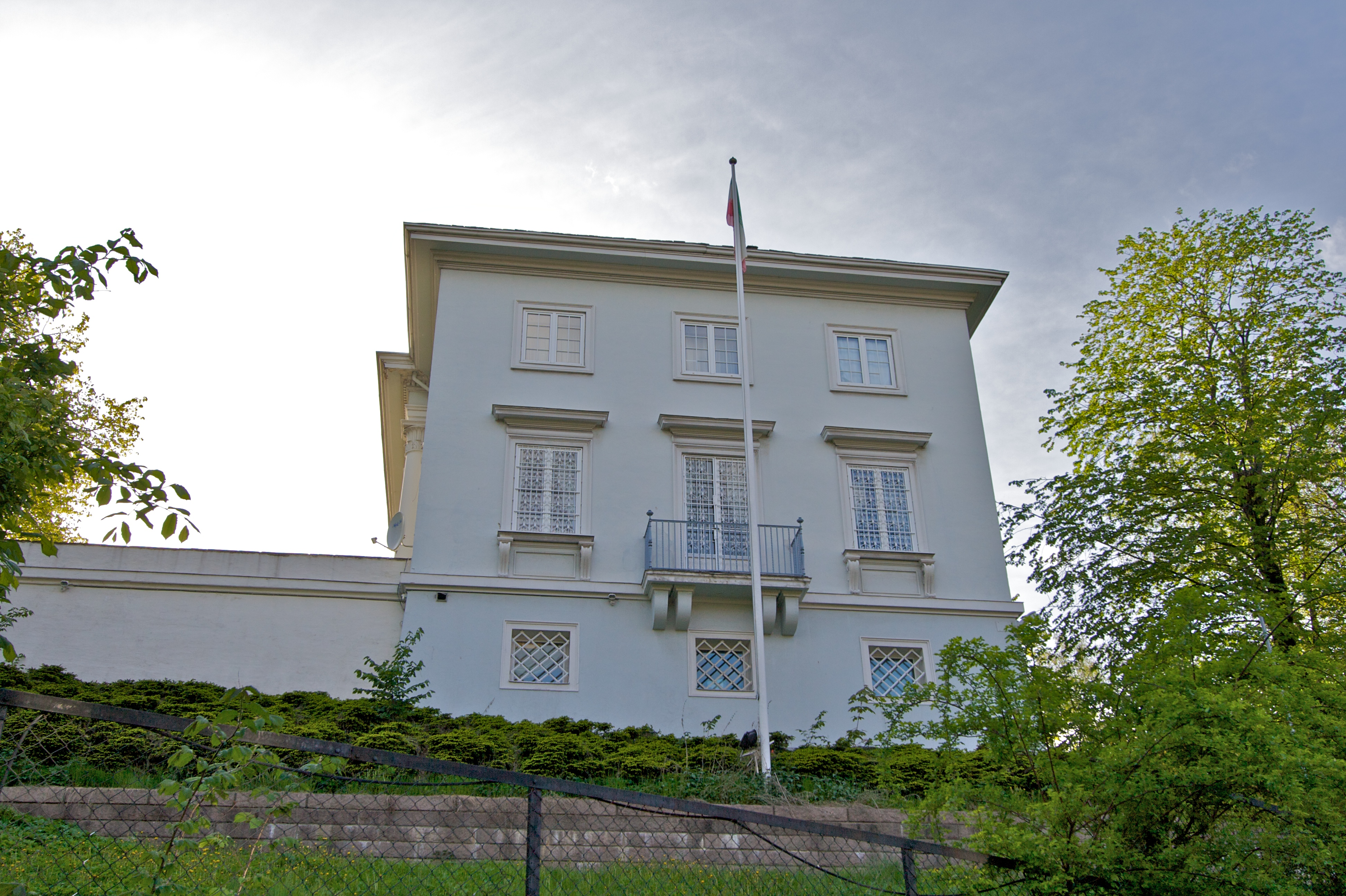
Flag at the Iranian Embassy in Oslo.

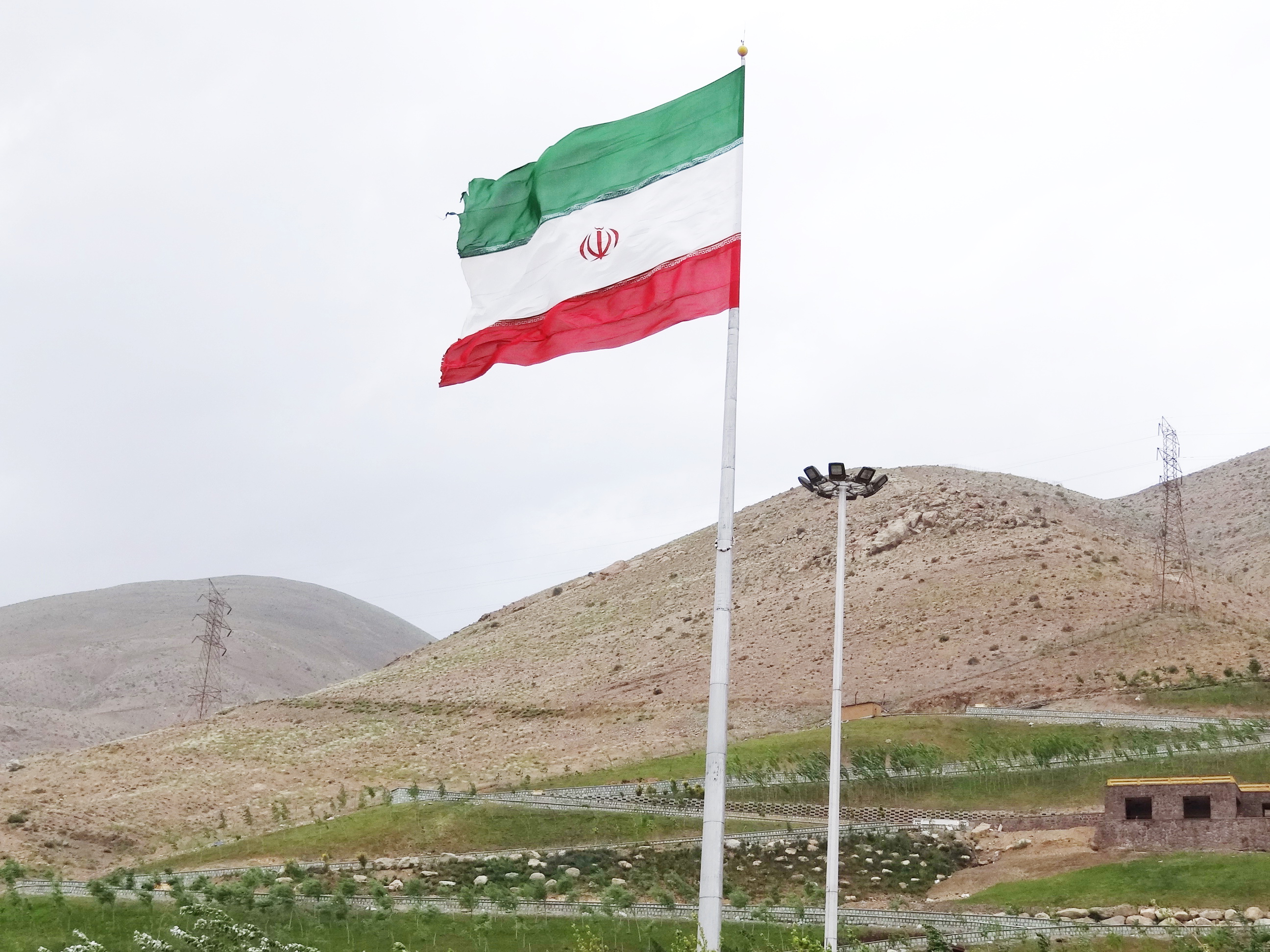
Flag flown at Abshar Park

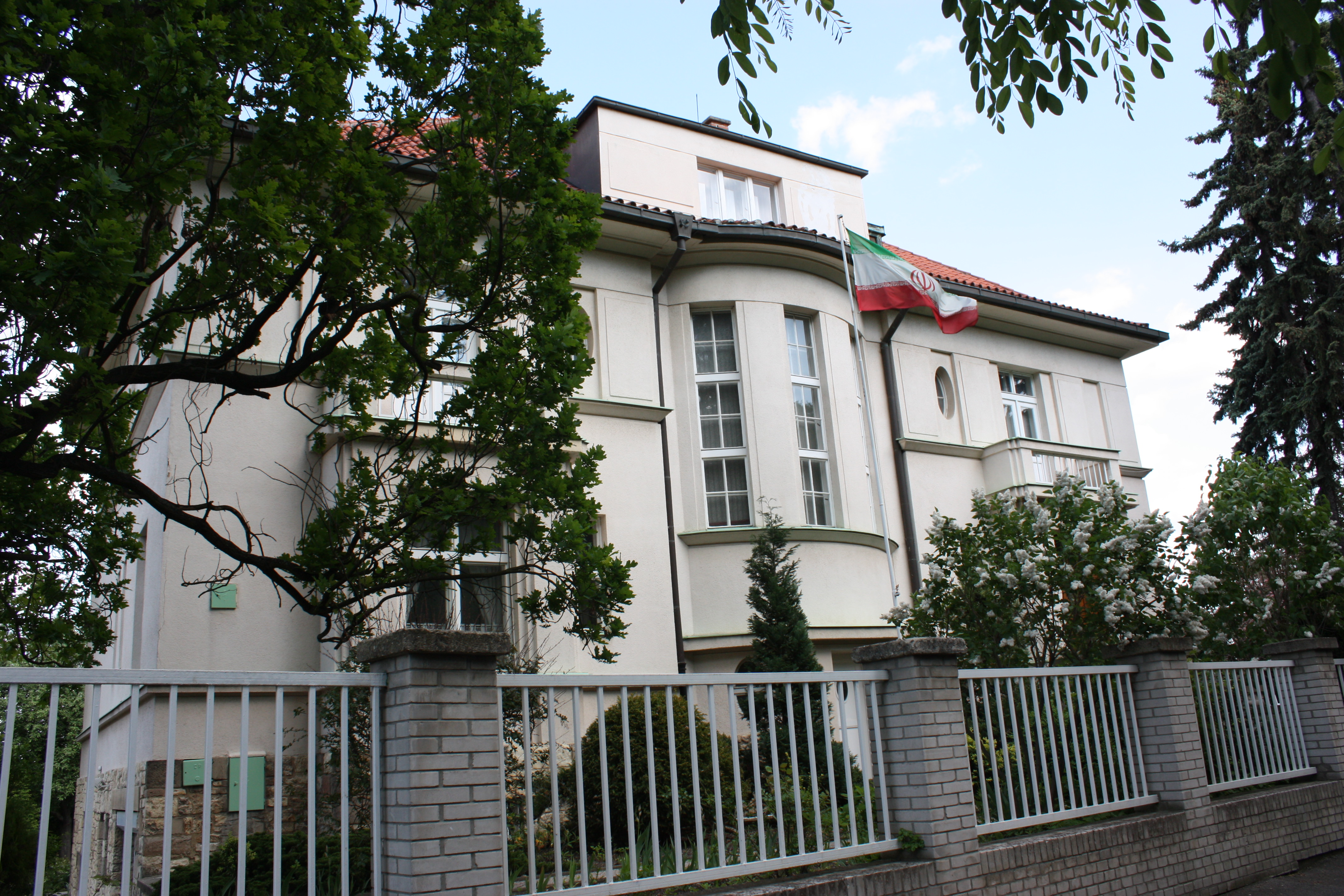
Residential Embassy of the Islamic Republic of Iran in Prague with the flag

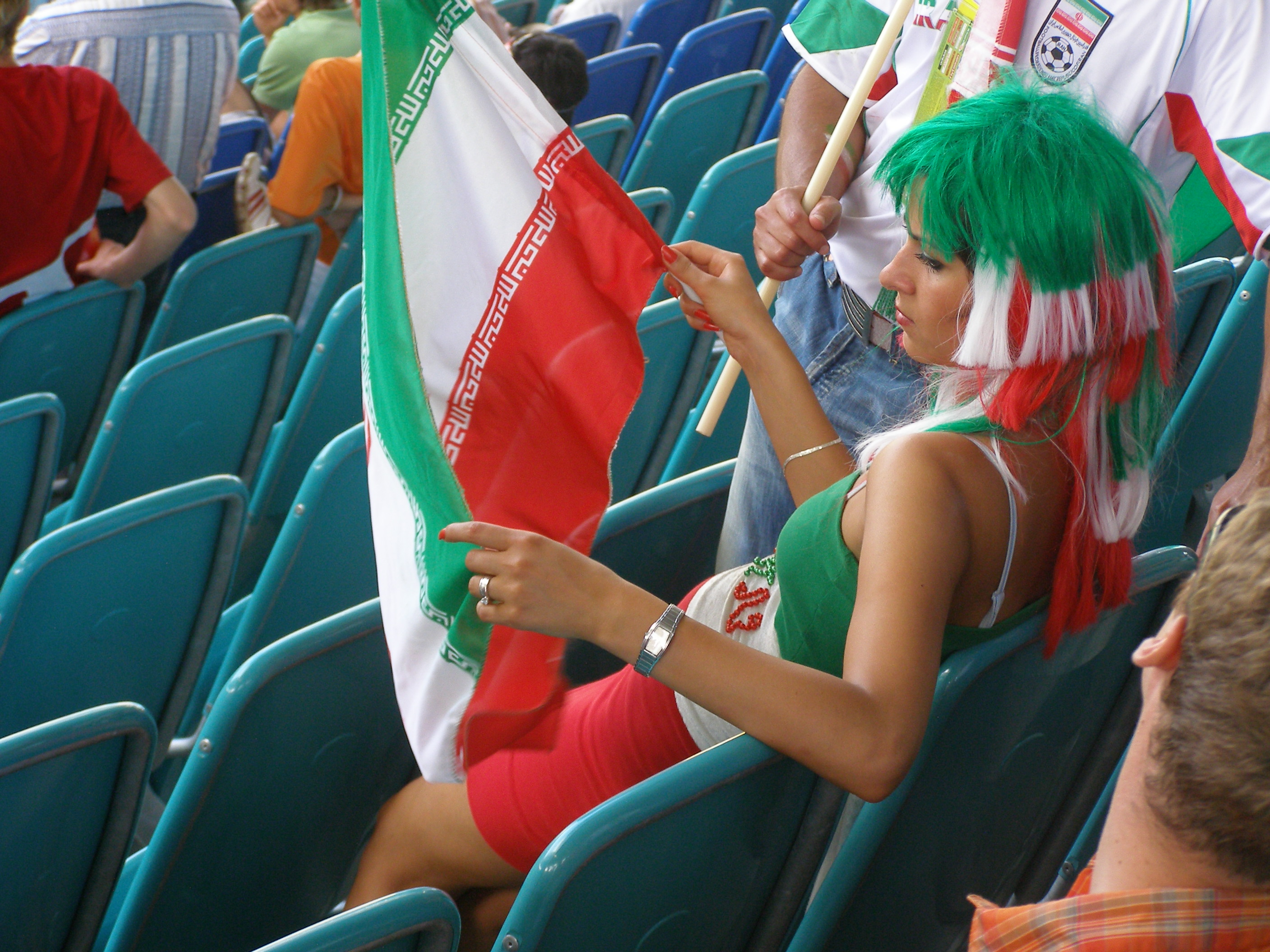
Football fan holding the flag during a match

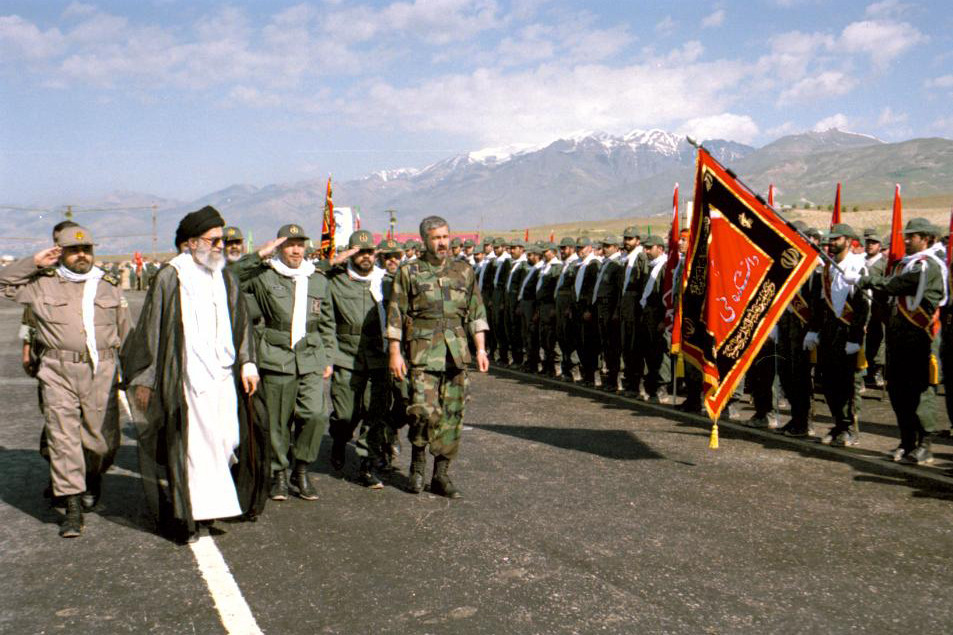
Ali Khamenei inspecting troops with the Islamic Republic military colours during a special ceremony

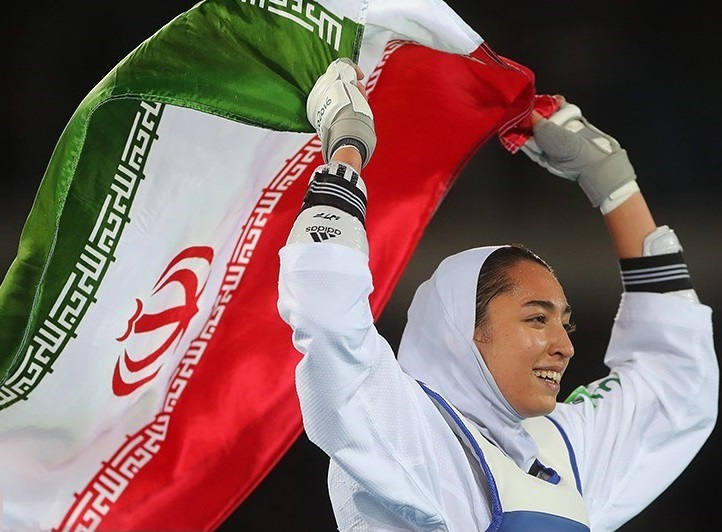
Lap of Honour of Kimia Alizade during 2016 Summer Olympics with the flag

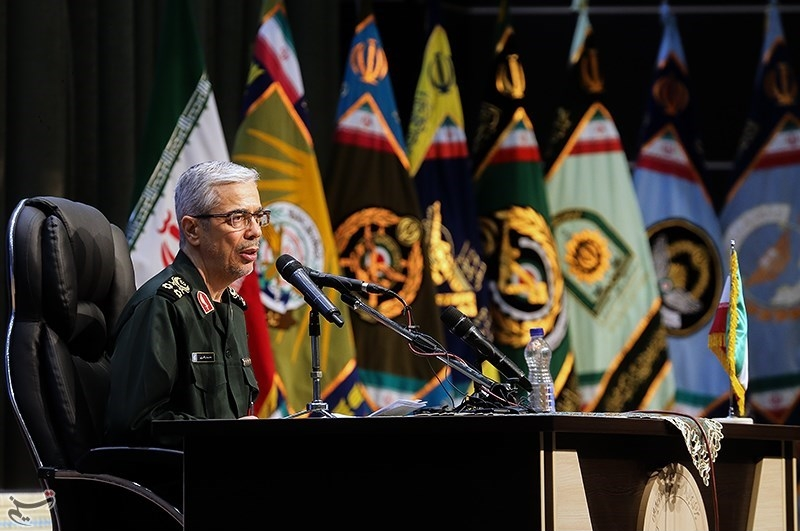
Mohammad Bagheri speaking with the Islamic Republic and military flags at the background.
Lion and Sun flag (main page)

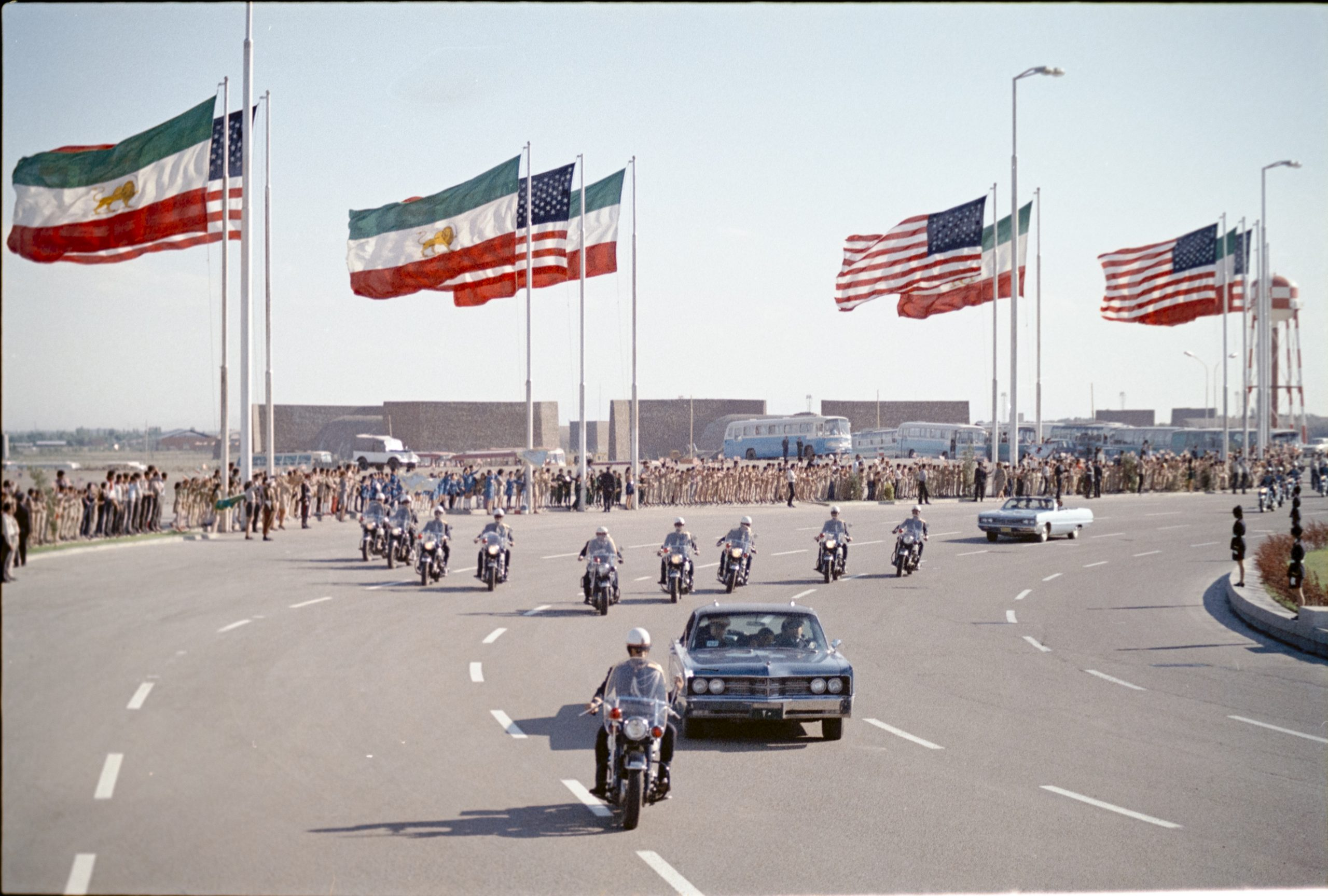
U.S. presidential motorcade in Tehran on 30 May 1972, with large contemporary Iranian and U.S. flags in the background

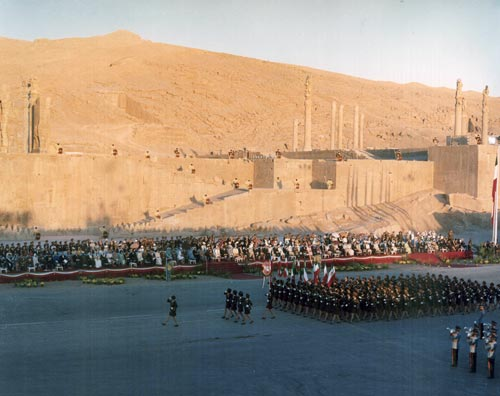
Soldiers in the parade with flags during the 2,500 year celebration of the Persian Empire

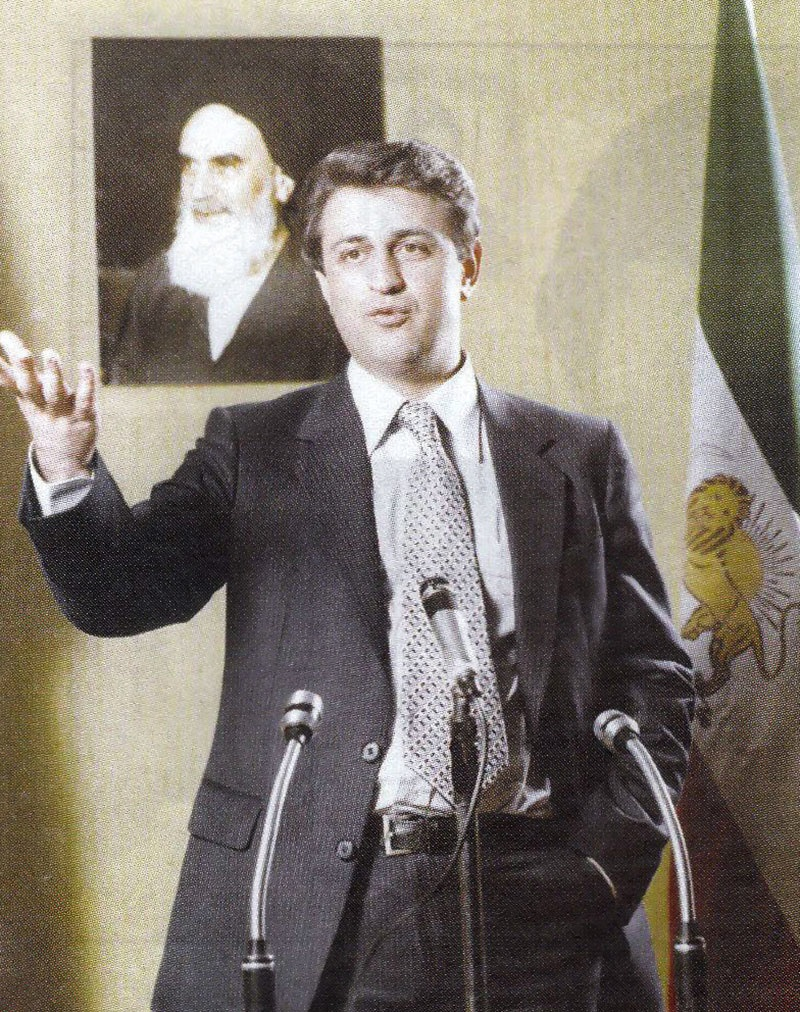
Sadeq Tabatabaei speaking at a post-revolution press conference with the flag behind him

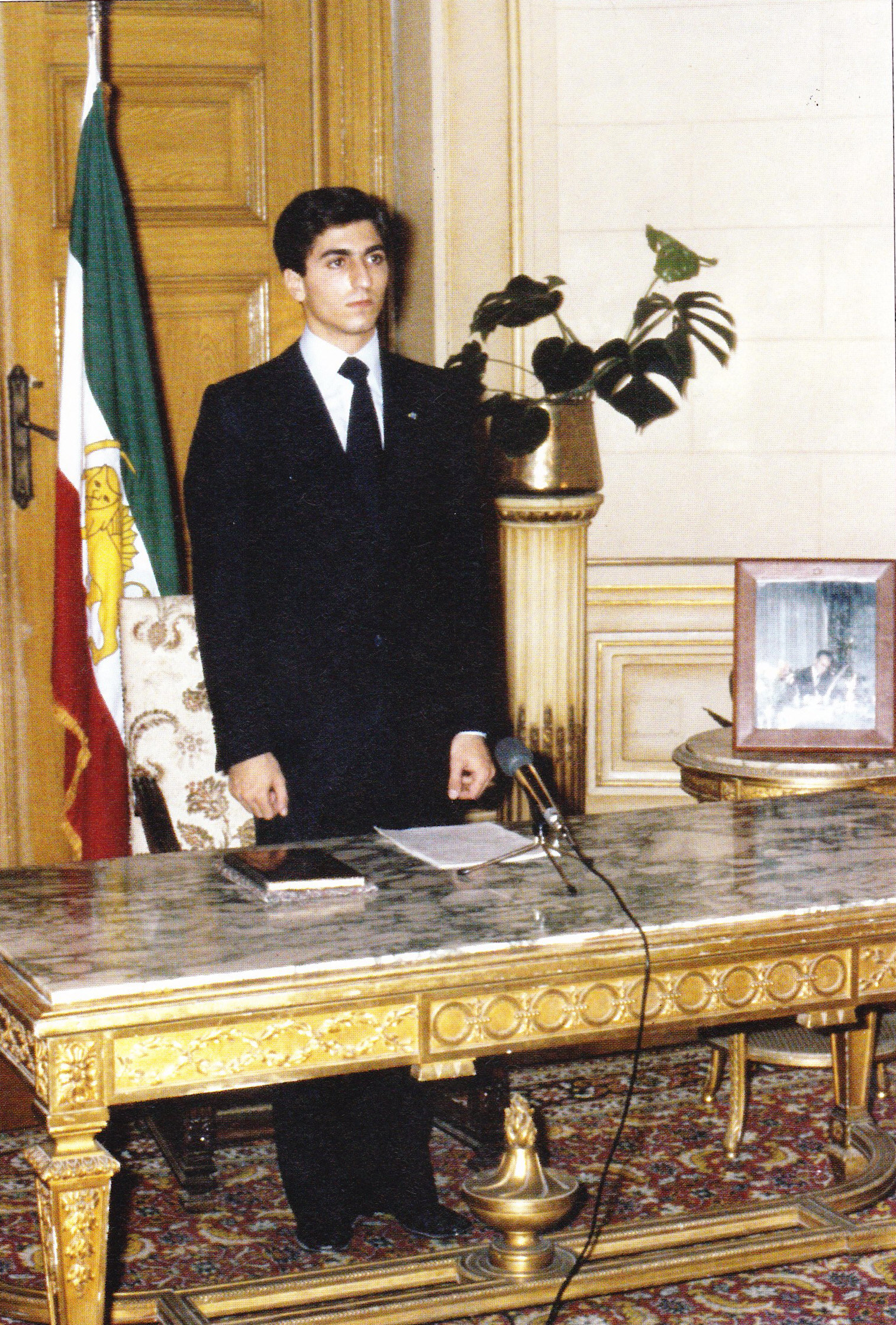
Reza Pahlavi, Crown Prince of Iran being sworn in with the flag behind him

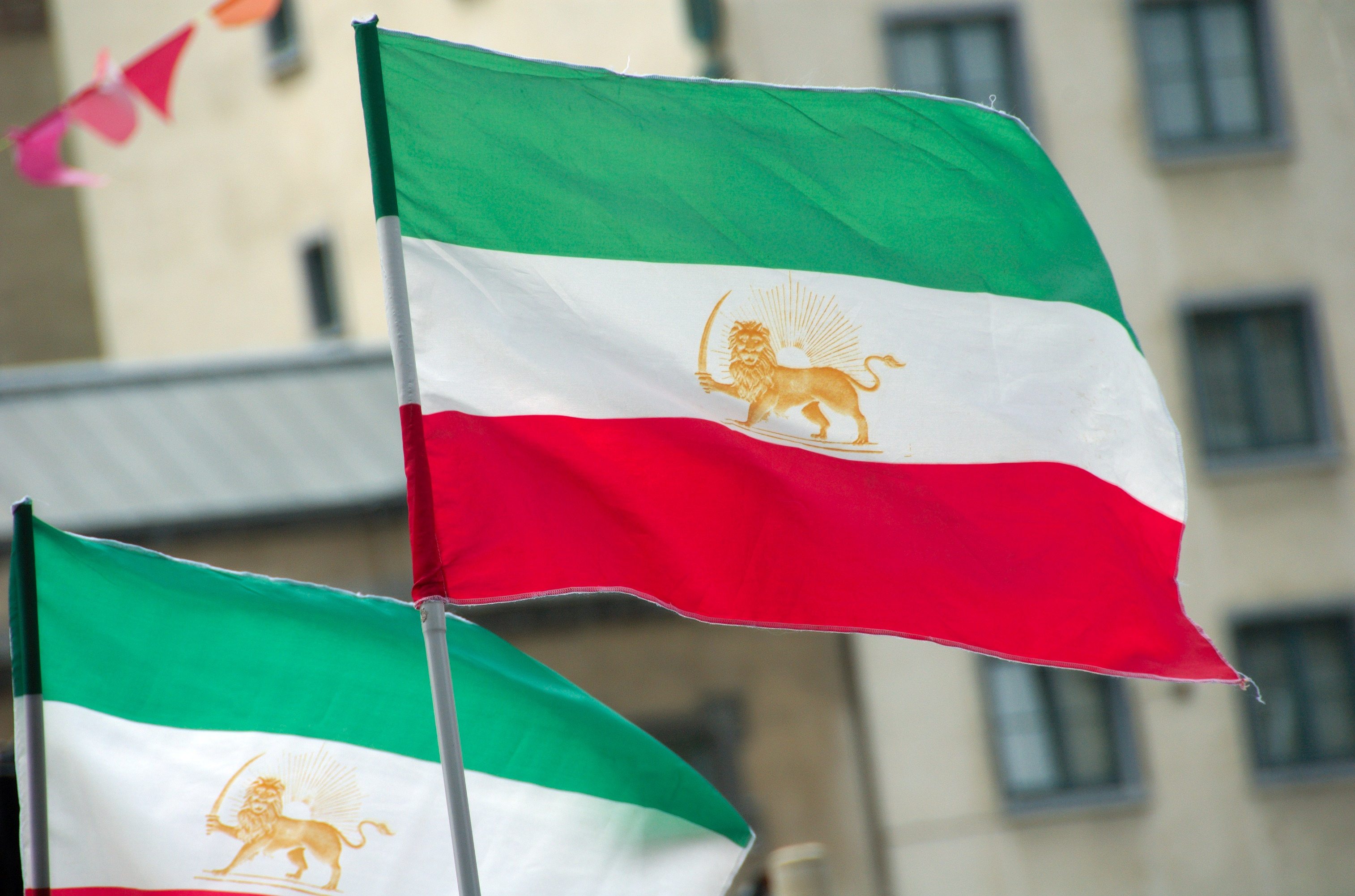
Two flags waved in a protest in Brussels

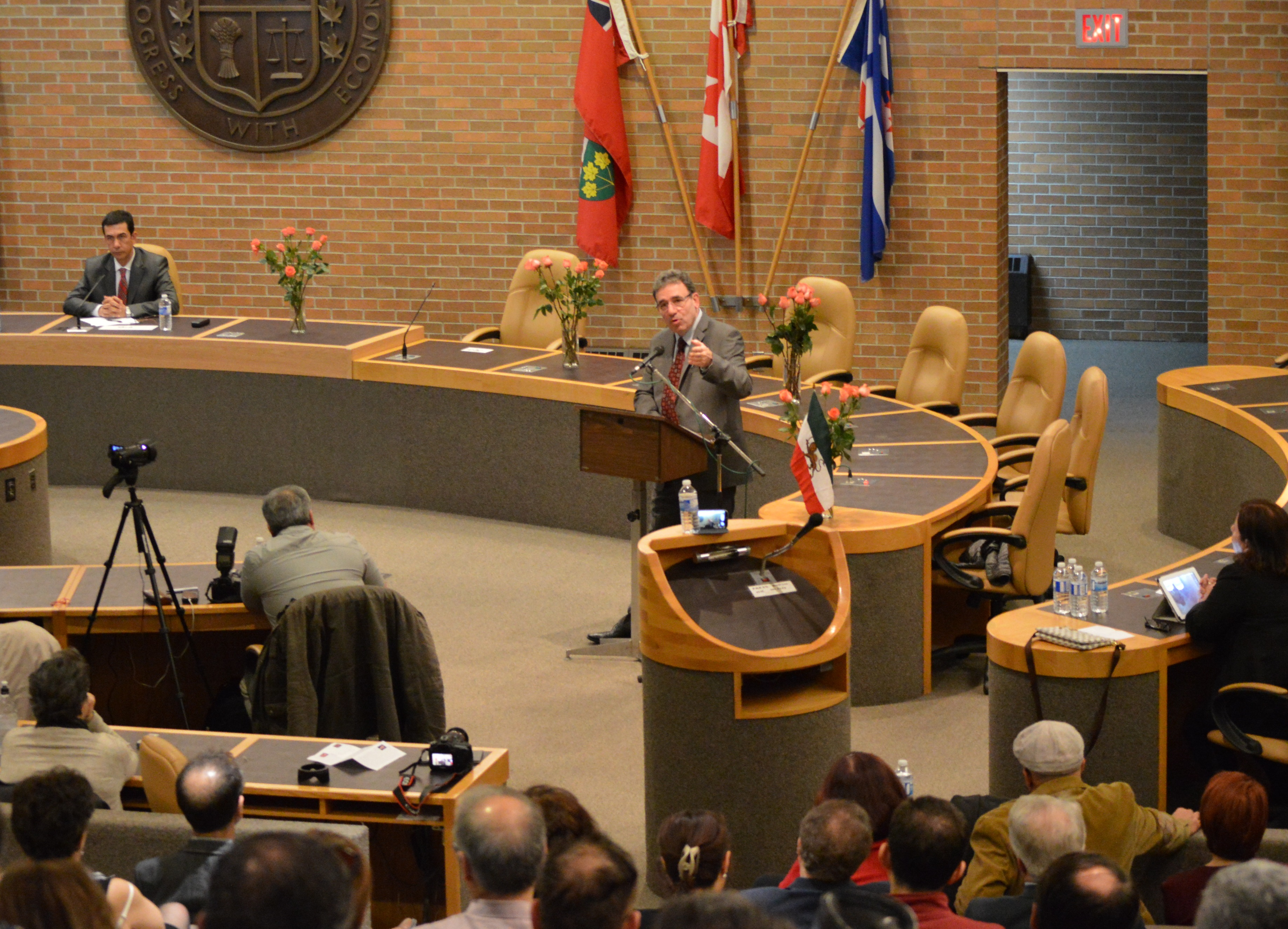
Political activist Hassan Dai addressing in Toronto with the flag

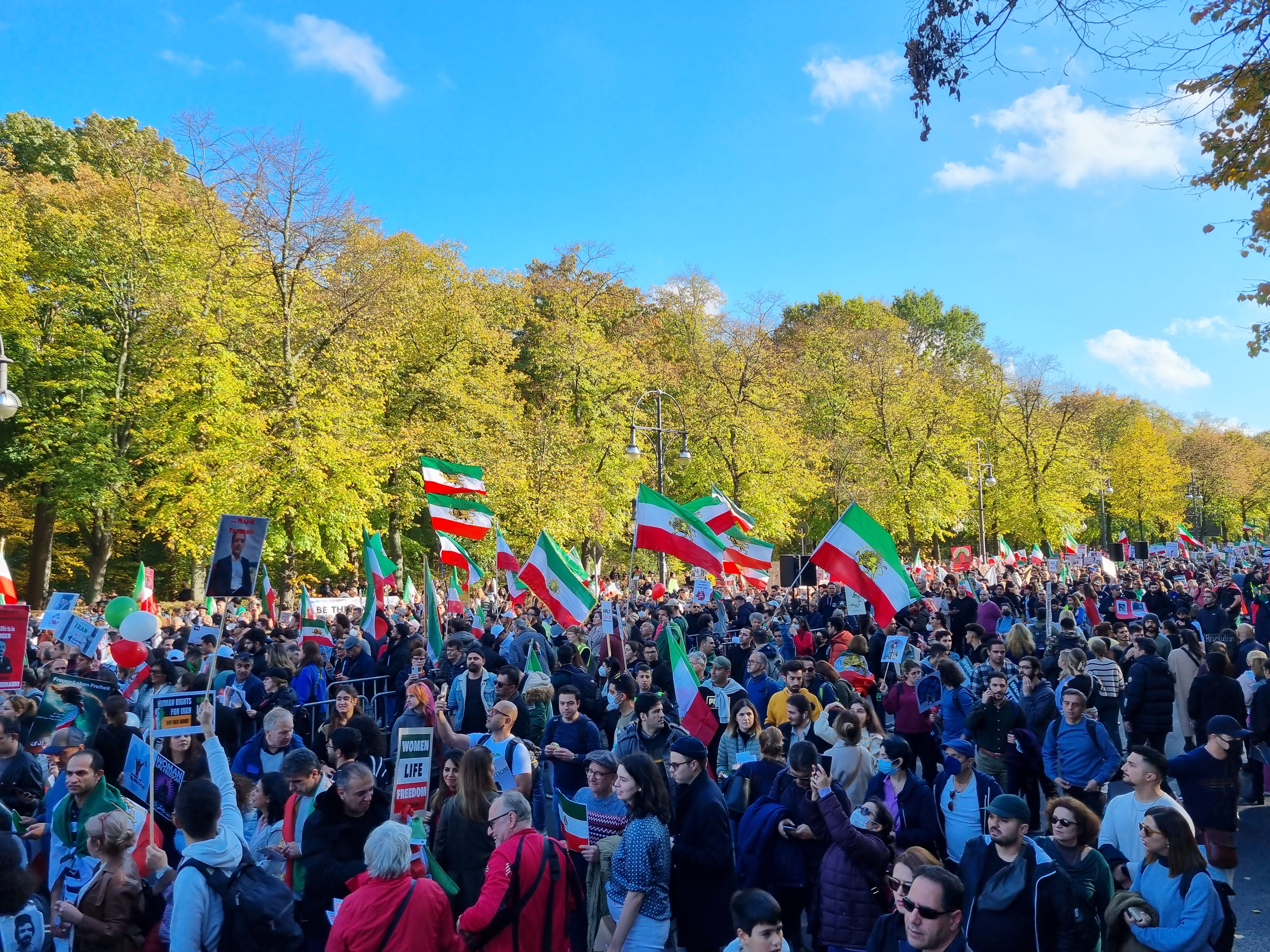
A number of flags seen in Germany in solidarity during the Mahsa Amini protests, October 2022

== See also ==
- Imperial Standards of Iran
- List of flags used by Iranian peoples
- List of Iranian flags
- Flags of the Islamic Republic of Iran Armed Forces
