= Estehlal Headquarters =

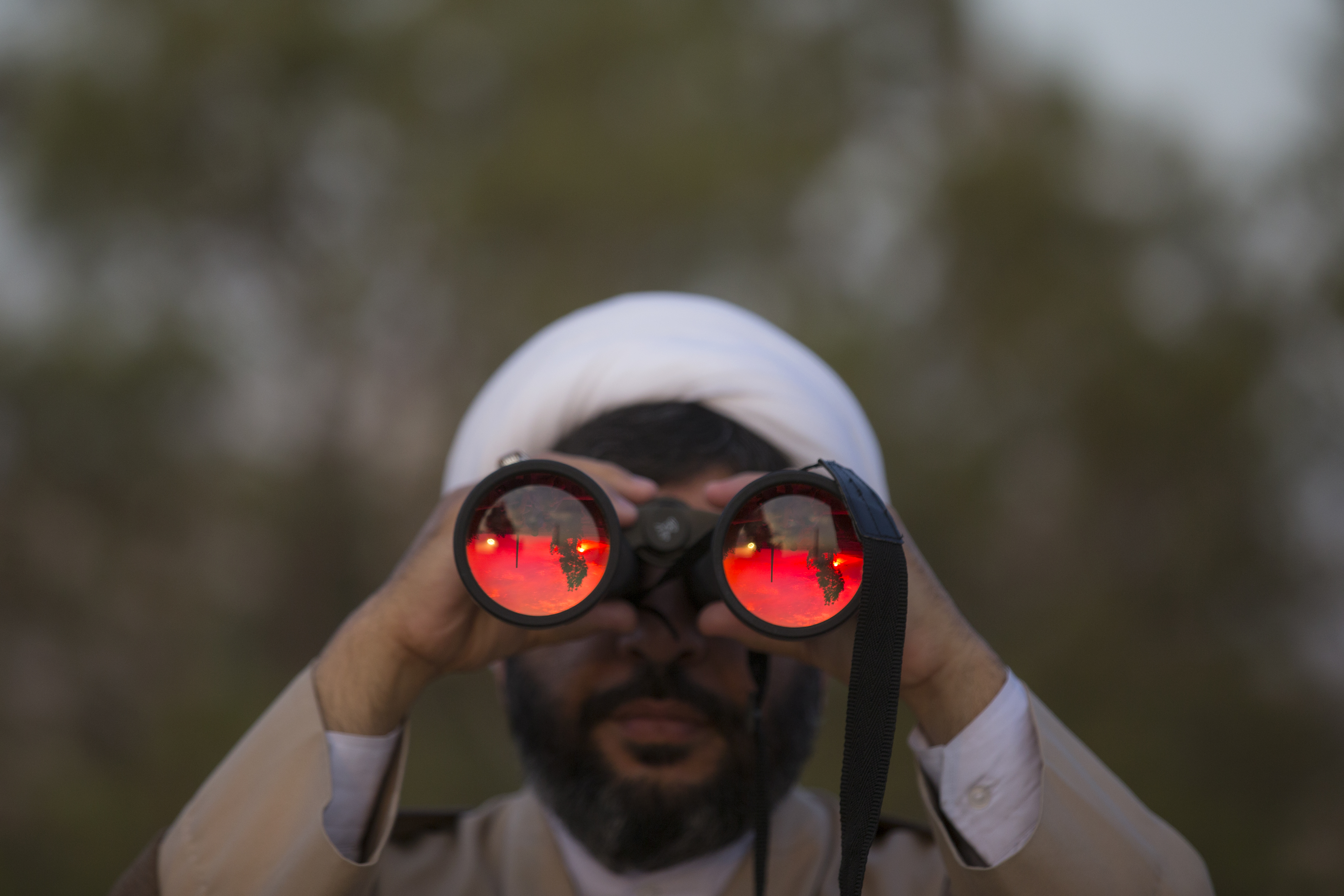
- Company type: Headquarters
- Founded: 1989
- Founder: Seyyed Ali Khamenei
- Headquarters: Tehran, Iran
- Area served: Throughout Iran
- Key people: Ahmad Marvi
- Number of employees: 150 groups with 700 members

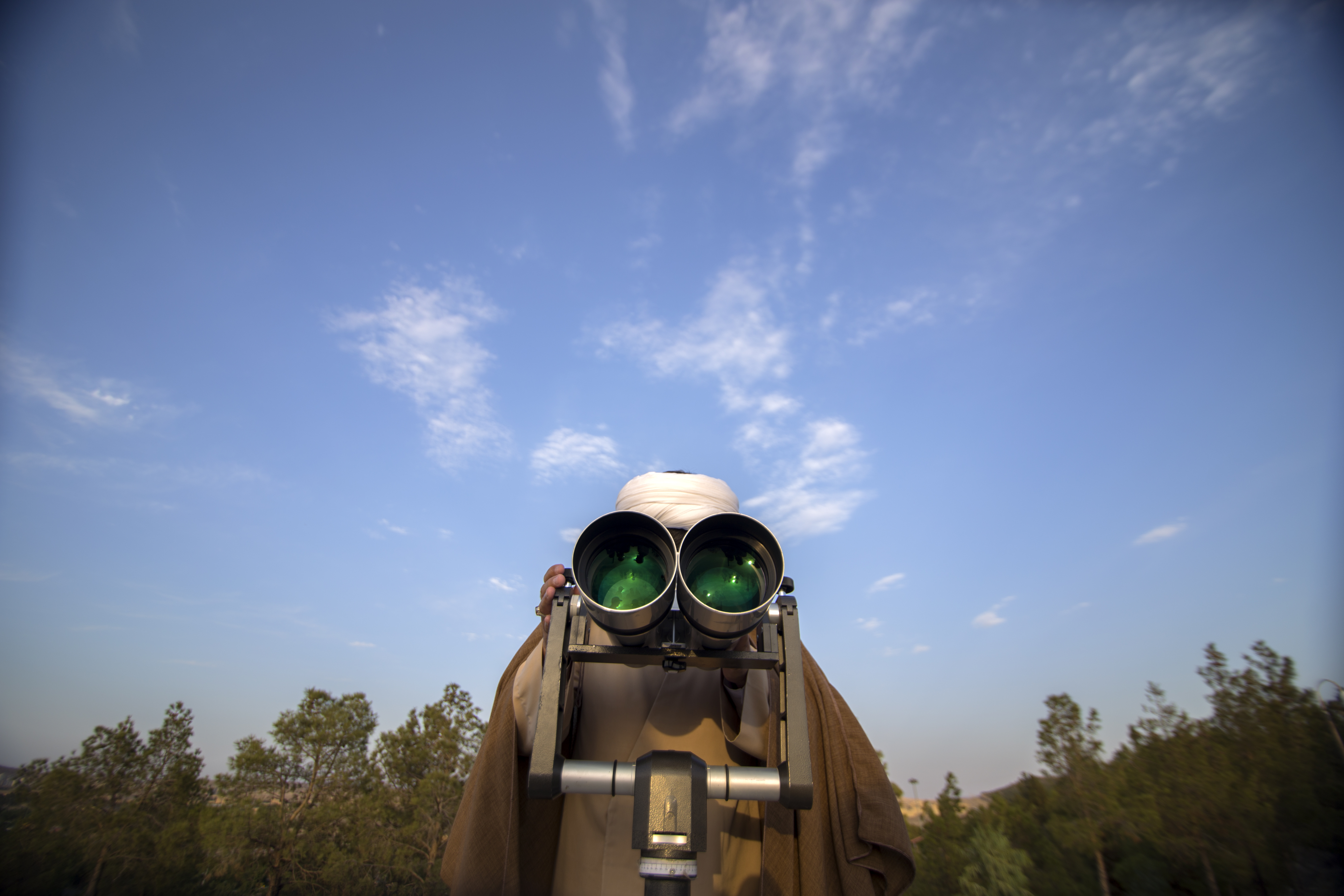
The practice of Estehlal (seeking the Moon); by an Iranian Shia cleric

Estehlal Headquarters (Persian: ستاد استهلال, romanised: Setade Estehlal) is an organization and command post based in Iran, that deploys groups to monitor the sky and identify the crescent of the moon on the first night(s) of the Lunar month, as per the Islamic tradition of Estehlal. This is undertaken to mark the first day of each month in the lunar calendar. Estehlal Headquarters was established by the decree of Iran's supreme leader, Seyyed Ali Khamenei, to regulate the practice of Estehlal. The Center consists of 150 groups with 700 members.

== Similar headquarters ==
Along with Iran's supreme leader, other Shia Marja' al-Taqlids have paid heed to the practice of Estehlal. Among them is Seyyed Ali Sistani, who established a related center in the city of Qom, and Mohammad Mohammadi Reishahri (the trusteeship of Shah Abdol-Azim Shrine), who established a similar center in Tehran.

== Significance ==
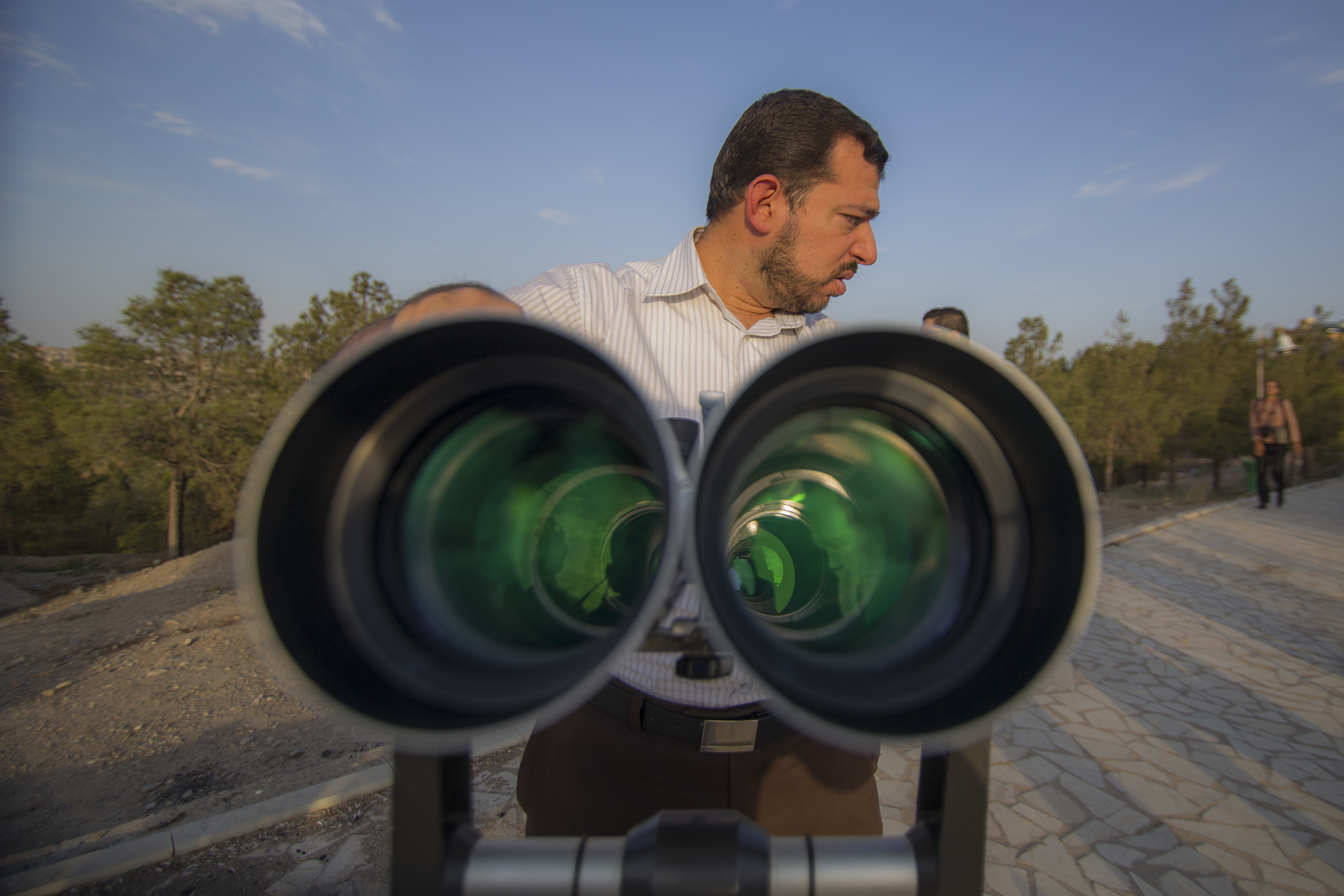
An observer conducting Estehlal.

The significance of Estehlal pertains to the observation of the Moon's crescent, referred to as Hilal. This practice is most notable at the annual beginning and end of Ramadan. Estehlal headquarters was established to clarify the existing disparities between similar organizations regarding the discernment of the beginning of lunar months; i.e. the Qamari months such as Ramadan, Shawwal, etc.

== See also ==
- Office of the Supreme Leader of Iran
- Islamic calendar
- Eid al-Fitr
- New moon
