= Amin Police Academy =

Coordinates: 35.7615°N 51.2488°E

- دانشگاه علوم انتظامی امین
- Flag of the Amin Police Academy
- Affiliations: Law Enforcement Force of Islamic Republic of Iran
- Officer in charge: Second Brigadier General Amir-Hossein Yavari
- Location: Tehran, Iran
- Website: apu.ac.ir

Graduation ceremony of Amin police academy in 2017

Amin Police Academy (Persian: دانشگاه علوم انتظامی امین) is a police academy in Iran affiliated with the Law Enforcement Command of Islamic Republic of Iran. The academy has provided training courses for police forces from 16 countries.
