= Riot police =

Police trained to confront crowds or riots

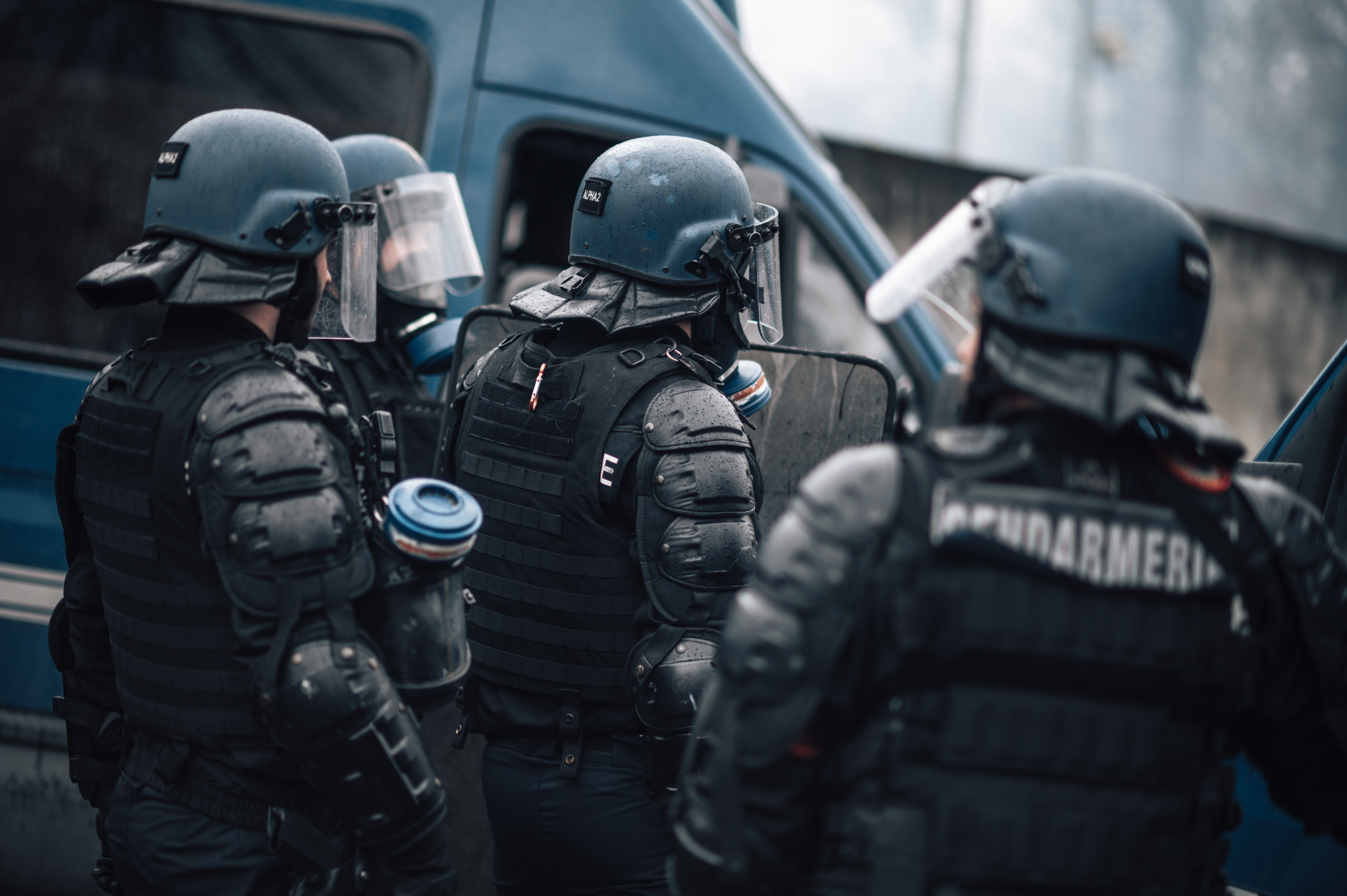
French Mobile Gendarmerie riot police officers during training

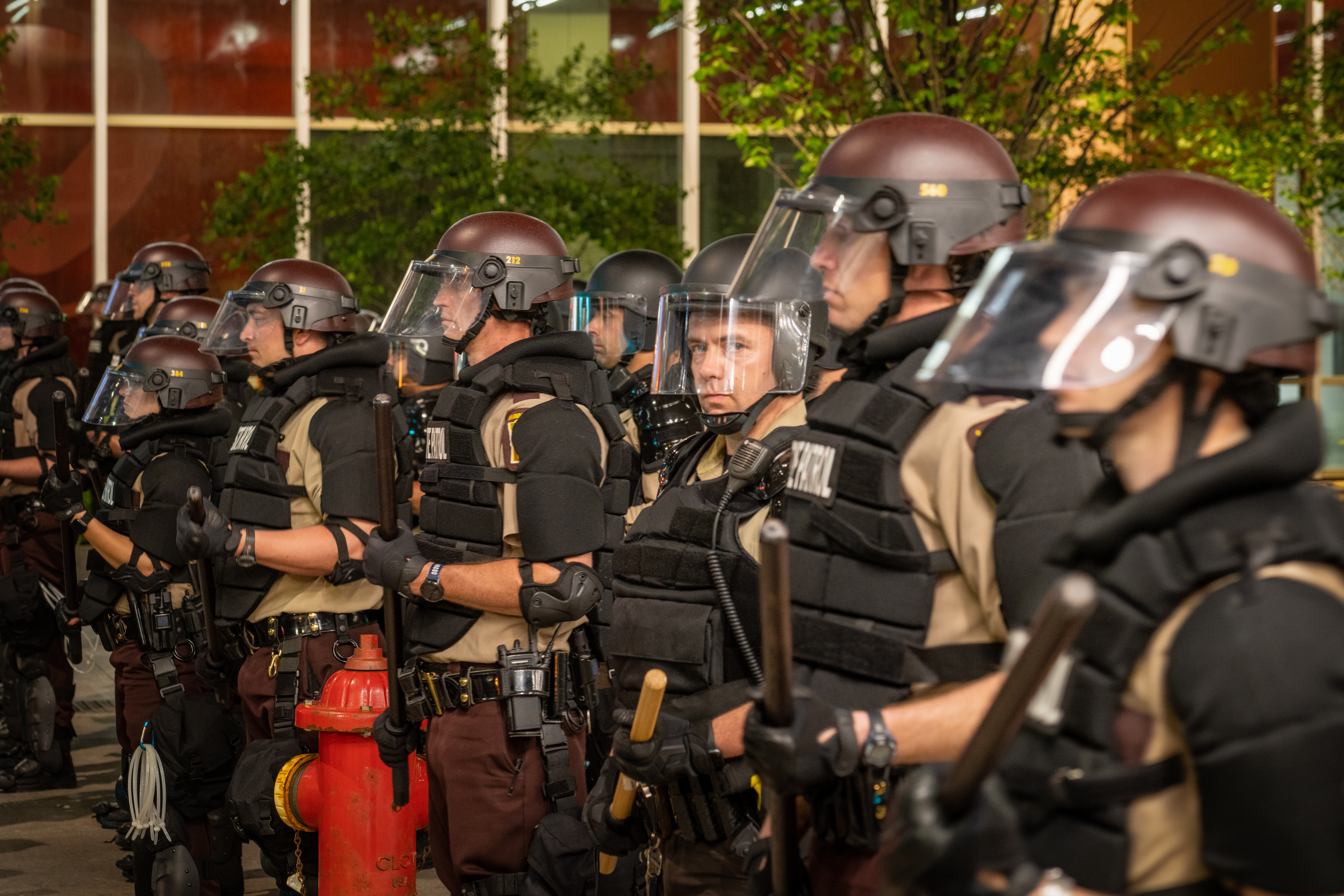
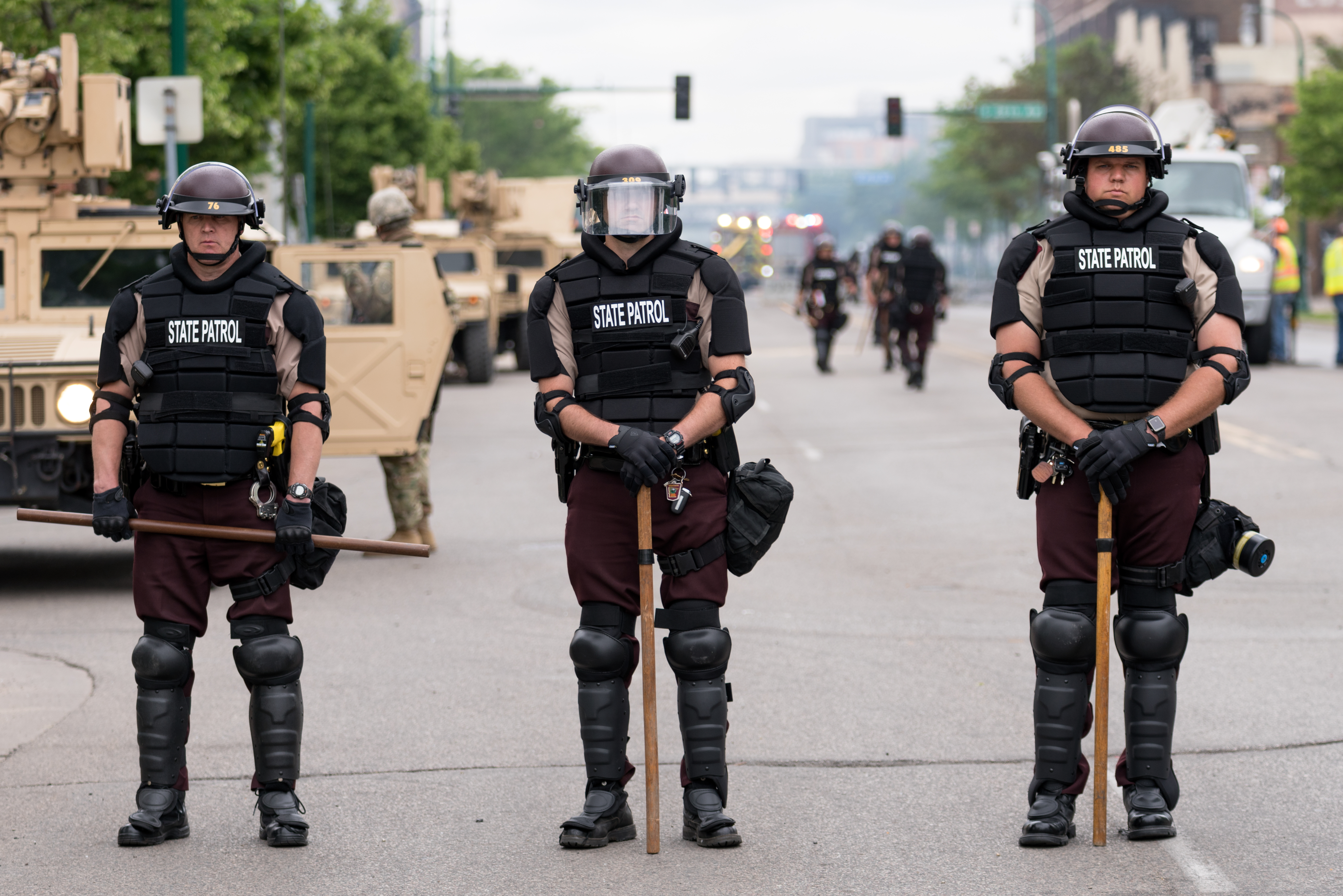
Minnesota State Patrol during the George Floyd protests on Friday, May 29, 2020, equipped with stab vests, helmets with face guards, and large wooden batons for use at protests.

Riot police are police who are organized, deployed, trained or equipped to confront crowds, protests or riots.

Riot police may be regular police officers who act in the role of riot police in particular situations, or they may be separate units organized within or in parallel to regular police forces. Riot police are used in a variety of different situations and purposes. They may be employed to control riots as their name suggests, to disperse or control crowds, to maintain public order or discourage criminality, or to protect people or property. The militarization of modern police has brought militaristic riot gear and new technologies that allow for their duties to expand above normal police duties.

== Riot gear ==
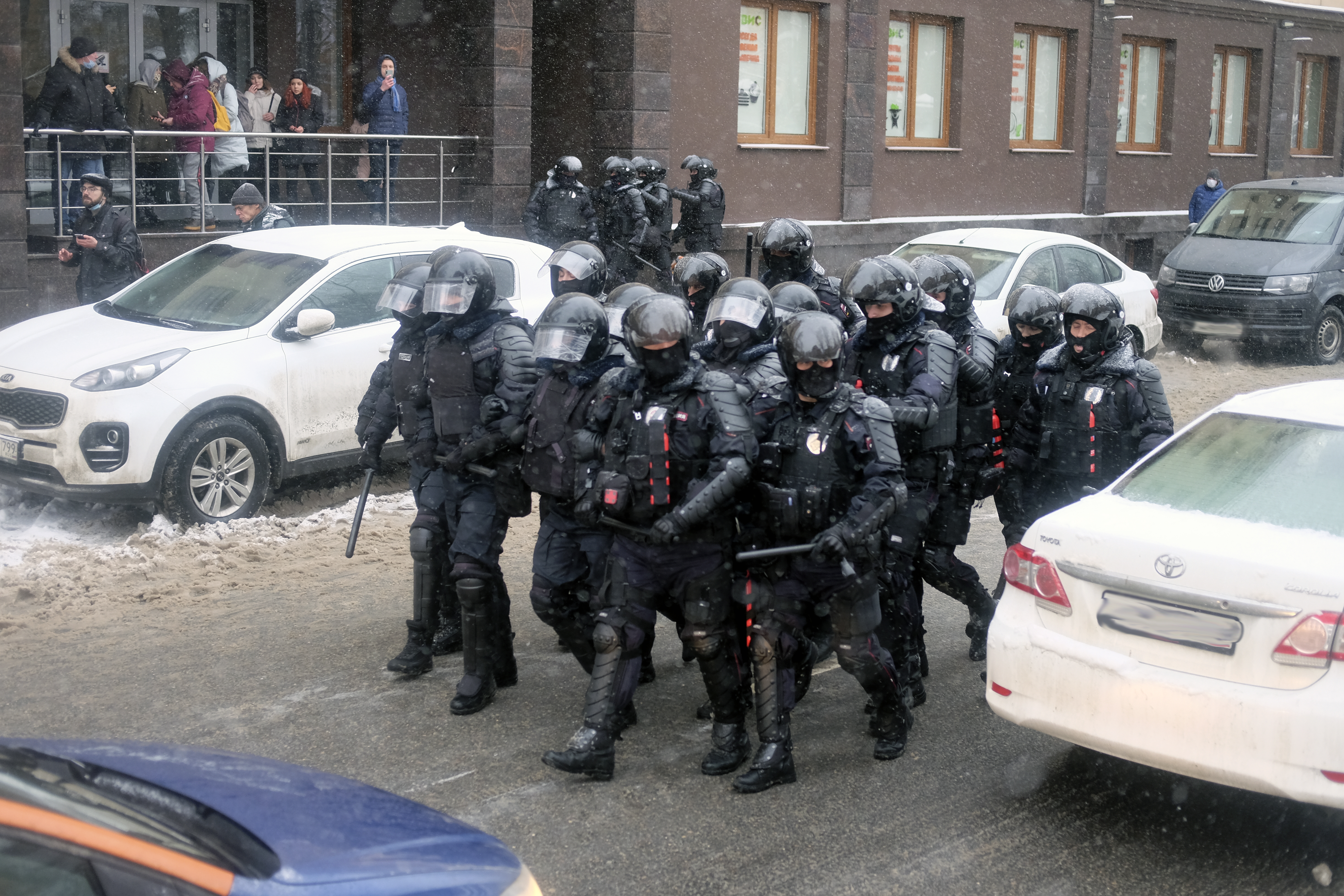
Russian riot police at a protest, 2021

Riot police often use special equipment called riot gear to help protect themselves and for offensive use in riot control. Riot gear typically includes personal armor, batons, tactical shield, riot shields, and riot helmets. Many riot police teams also deploy specialized non-lethal weapons, such as: baton rounds, sponge grenade, pepper spray, tear gas, riot guns, rubber bullets, stun grenades, water cannons, and Long Range Acoustic Devices. Mounted police have also been used for riot control.

Through the 1900s and into the 2000s, riot gear technology has advanced with the help of the militarization of riot police organizations. Some riot gear technology, including tear gas, was originally created for its use in the military, specifically the First World War. In the United States in 1969, it was recorded that the riot police had extensive militarized gear including bulletproof vests, multiple-purpose grenades, water cannons, helicopters, batons, radio communication, barbed wire, police shields, and riot vehicles. In 2017, economic and political protests in Venezuela brought upon a new era of Venezuelan riot police gear with military vehicles that included features like tear gas launchers and water cannons. The military vehicles were used as perimeter defense lines to contain the protests, and provide the riot police with enough power to inhibit the advancing violence. These military vehicles used by riot police around the world are commonly sourced from military product companies including Norinco, a Chinese military product manufacturer.

In the United States, the federal 1033 program allows for police departments, including riot police units, to request military equipment for circumstances that have arrived or that may arrive in the future. Because of this program, police militarization has expanded across each state allowing state riot police to receive military style gear similar to that of the Special Weapons and Tactics teams. The police departments that received 1033 program funding are primarily smaller police departments.

Riot gear became the key tools for police forces to combat large demonstrations, including political and economic protests and labor demonstrations, that sought change without the explicit consent of the presiding government.

== Riot police duties ==
Riot police are tasked with police operations that require advanced tactics and equipment to control crowds and maintain public order. These duties may differ between riot police organizations in different countries, but they are often similar in that they are tasked with maintaining order that is decided on by the presiding government.

In Poland, for example, riot police are used in a variety of different ways including but not limited to:

- Maintaining public order when threats from risk assessed sources are present.
- Searching and assisting police forces in capturing wanted fugitives.
- In case of widespread emergency, acting as a mobile force to protect and serve the public.
- Securing government officials, particularly from foreign countries, during their travels.
- Maintaining public order during demonstrations including political protests.
- Supporting police forces in apprehending and suppressing criminal group activities.
- Acting as backup police force for any police units that may need assistance in their everyday duties.
- Participating and overseeing training for riot police units and non-riot police units.

== List of riot police organizations ==
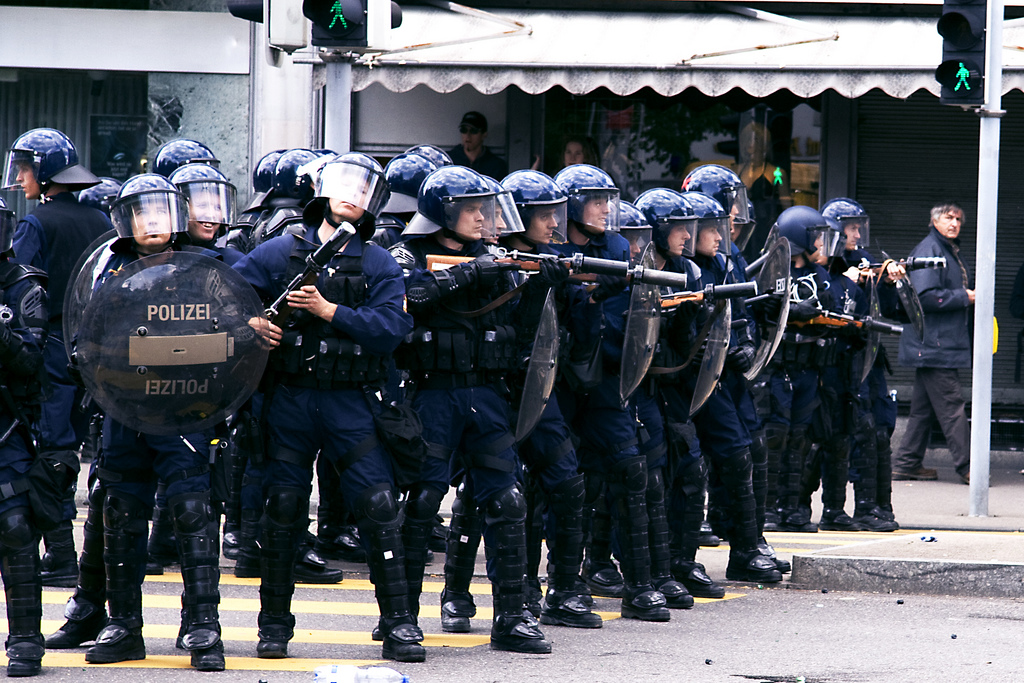
Swiss Kantonspolizei Zürich riot police officers attempting to control May Day riots in 2008

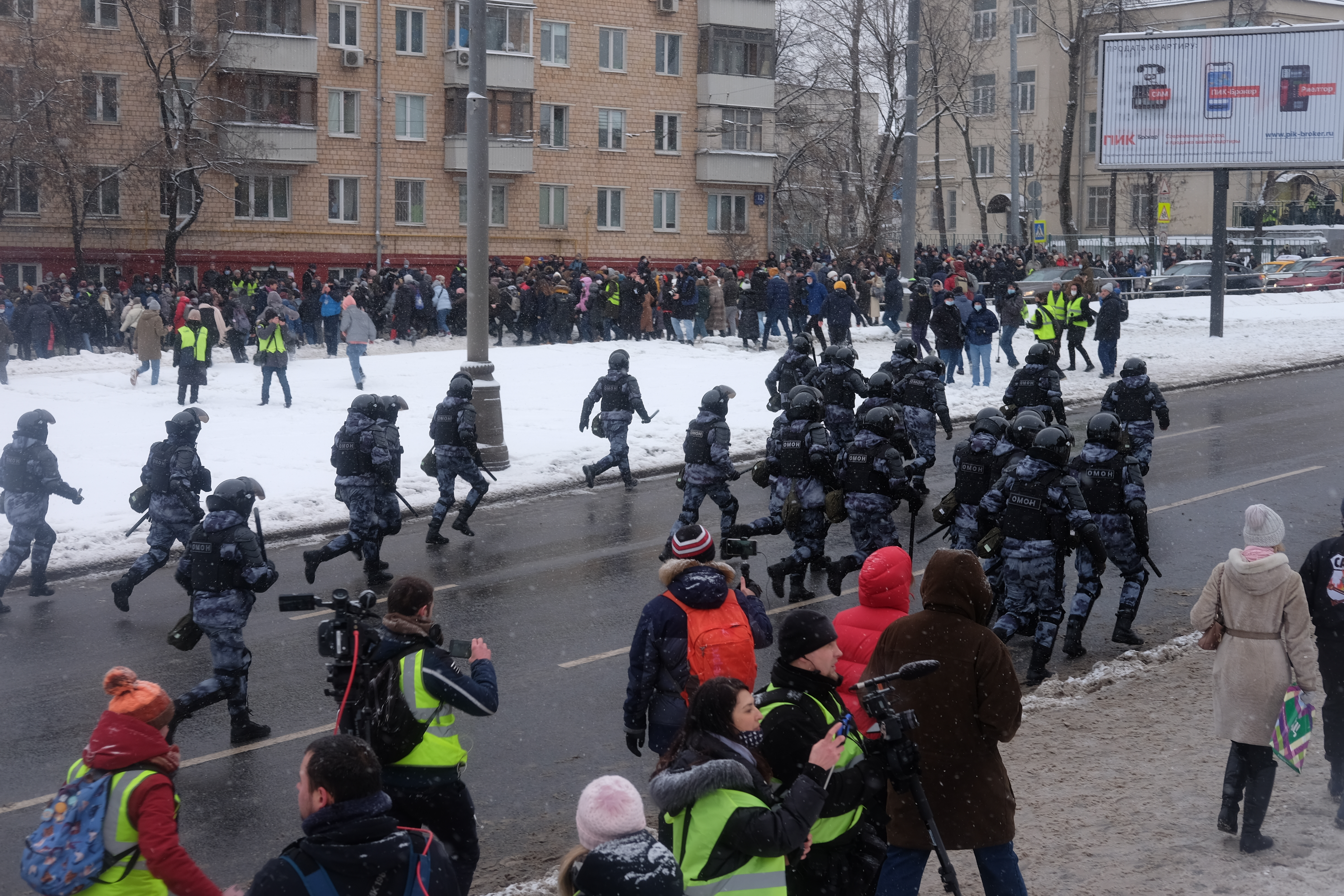
Russian OMON officers advancing on protesters in Moscow during the 2021 Russian protests

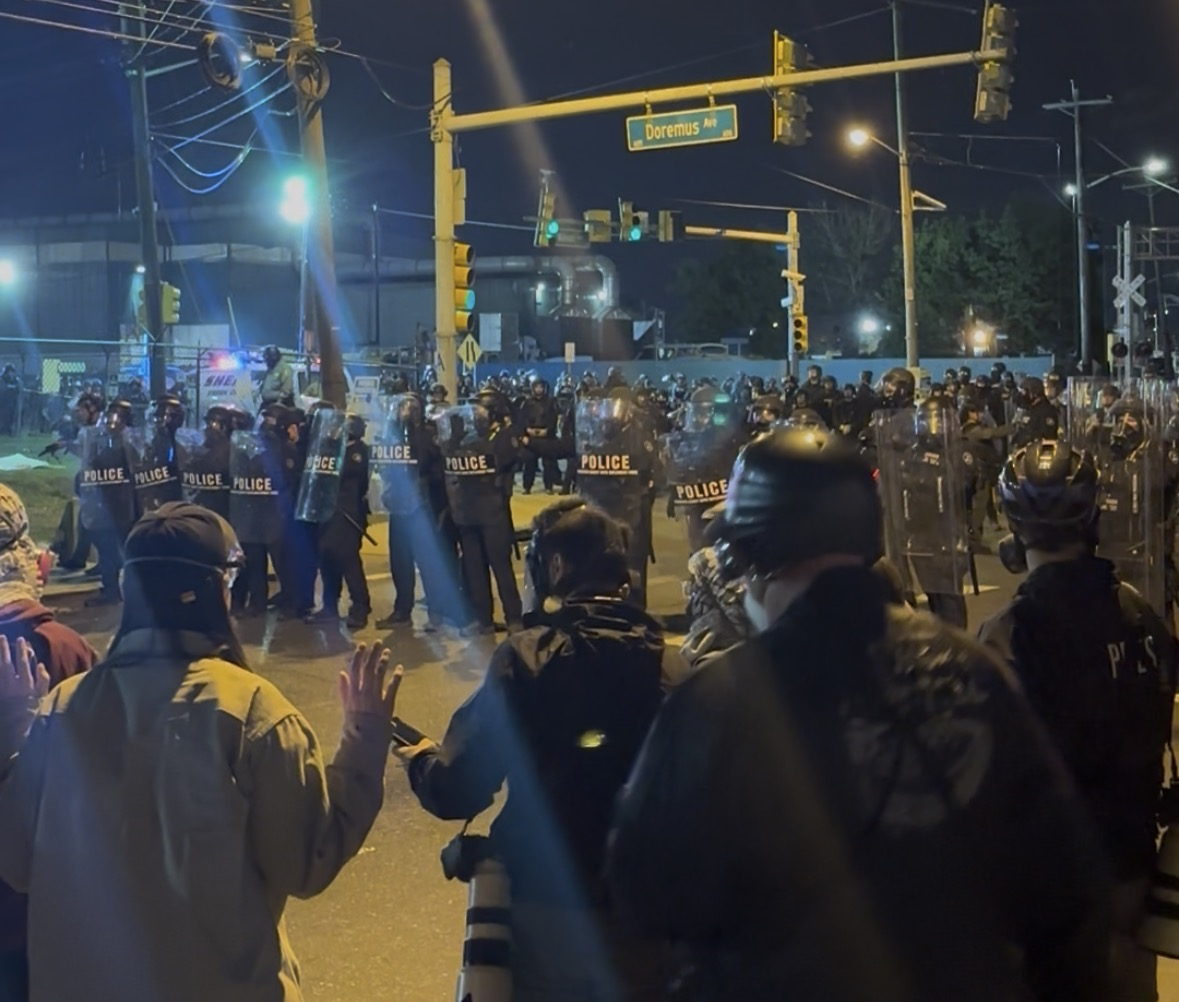
US New Jersey State Police shortly before kettling and making mass arrests on protesters and journalists at the 2026 Delaney Hall protests

- Albania – Rapid Intervention Force (Albania)
- Argentina – Policía Federal Argentina D.O.U.C.A.D/ Infantry Guard Corp Gendarmeria Nacional Argentina Prefectura Naval Argentina
- Australia – Public Order and Riot Squad (New South Wales); Public Order Response Team (Victoria); Public Safety Response Team (Queensland)
- Austria – Bereitschaftseinheit Wien of the Federal Police
- Azerbaijan – Azərbaycan Respublikası Daxili Qoşunları (Interior Troops)
- Bahrain – Special Security Force Command (SSFC)
- Belarus – OMON, Internal Troops of Belarus
- Belgium – Directie Openbare Veiligheid (DAS)/Direction Securité Public (DAS) (since 2016)
- Brazil – Rondas Ostensivas Tobias de Aguiar (São Paulo)
- Bulgaria – National Gendarmerie Service
- Canada – Emergency Response Teams and Public Order Units of the Royal Canadian Mounted Police, Ontario Provincial Police, Sûreté du Québec, and various regional police services
- Chile – Control de Orden Público
- China – People's Armed Police
- Colombia – ESMAD (since 1999)
- Czech Republic – Public Order Units
- France – Compagnies Républicaines de Sécurité (CRS) and Gendarmerie Mobile
- Germany – Bereitschaftspolizei units of the 16 Landespolizei (state police) forces and the Bundespolizei (federal police)
- Georgia - Special Tasks Department with Facilities Protection Department (Mostly Conscripts)
- Greece – Units for the Reinstatement of Order
- Hong Kong – Police Tactical Unit and Special Tactical Squad
- Hungary –Intervention Police (Hungary) Készenléti Rendőrség
- Indonesia – Mobile Brigade Corps (Brimob)
- India – Central Reserve Police Force, including Rapid Action Force units, Malabar Special Police unit of Kerala Police, State Armed Police Forces, Central Armed Police Forces
- Iran - Basij, Iranian Public Security and Intelligence Police (PAVA), Iranian Police Special Units (YEGUP), Counter-terrorism Special Force (NOPO)، Women's Special Unit
- Ireland – Garda Public Order Unit
- Israel – Yasam
- Italy – Reparto Mobile Polizia di Stato; Carabinieri (1st and 2nd Carabinieri Mobile Brigades, Multinational Specialized Unit)
- Japan – Riot Police Unit
- Kenya – General Service Unit
- Kazakhstan - Internal Troops of the Ministry of Internal Affairs
- Kyrgyzstan – Internal Troops of the Ministry of the Interior
- Latvia – Special Tasks Battalion of State Police (Latvia) (Speciālo Uzdevumu Bataljons)
- Lithuania – Public Security Service (VST)
- Malaysia – Federal Reserve Unit
- Moldova - Trupele de Carabinieri (Moldovan Carabinier Troops), since 1991
- Mongolia – Internal Troops
- Myanmar – Lon Htein
- Netherlands – Mobiele Eenheid (since 1936), Bijstandseenheid
- Philippines - Special Action Force, Mobile Force Battalions/Companies
- Poland – ZOMO (1956 – 1989), Oddziały Prewencji Policji (OPP), Samodzielne Pododdziały Prewencji Policji (SPPP)
- Portugal – Corpo de Intervenção | Unidade Especial de Polícia | Polícia de Segurança Pública and Grupo de Intervenção e Ordem Publica/ Guarda Nacional Republicana
- Romania – Trupele de Securitate (1948 – 1989), Romanian Gendarmerie (1893 – 1948 and again since 1990)
- Russia – OMON, National Guard of Russia
- Serbia – Gendarmery, Police Brigade
- Spain – Unidad de Intervención Policial (UIP), Unidad de Prevención y Reacción (UPR), Grupos de Reserva y Seguridad (GRS),
- Singapore – Police Tactical Unit (Singapore)
- South Africa – Public Order Police
- Seychelles – Public Security Support Wing (PSSW)
- South Korea – Mobile Police, a division of National Police Agency
- Taiwan – Special Police, NPASOG
- Tajikistan – Tajik Internal Troops
- Turkey – Çevik Kuvvet
- Turkmenistan – Türkmenistanyň içeri işler edaralarynyň işgärlerine (Internal Troops)
- Thailand – Protection and Crowds Control Division , Metropolitan Police Bureau
- Ukraine – Berkut (1992 – 2014), Patrol Police (since 2006)
- United Kingdom – Territorial Support Group (Metropolitan Police area)
- United States – SWAT/SRT, Strategic Response Group (New York City Police Department), Texas Ranger Division (Texas)
- Uzbekistan – Internal Troops of the Ministry of Internal Affairs
- Venezuela – Bolivarian National Guard and Bolivarian National Police
- Vietnam – Mobile Police Command

== See also ==
- Formed Police Unit
- Internal Troops
- List of riots
- Mobile Field Force
- Police tactical unit
