= Rendőrség =

Civil law enforcement agency in Hungary

Police Rendőrség
- Coat of arms of the Hungarian Police
- Abbreviation: ORFK
- Motto: Szolgálunk és Védünk "We Serve and Protect"

Agency overview
- Formed: 1955 (Communist era); 1990 (Current)
- Dissolved: 1990 (Communist era)
- Employees: 45,000 (2023)
- Annual budget: $50 million

Jurisdictional structure
- Operations jurisdiction: Hungary
- Governing body: Ministry of Interior

Operational structure
- Headquarters: Budapest
- Elected officer responsible: Gábor Pósfai, Interior Minister
- Agency executive: Brigadier general Dr. Tamás Mecser, Police Commissioner
- Child agency: Intervention Police
- Province Police Commands: 20: Budapest; Baranya; Bács-Kiskun; Békés; Borsod-Abaúj-Zemplén; Csongrád-Csanád; Fejér; Győr-Moson-Sopron; Hajdú-Bihar; Heves; Jász-Nagykun-Szolnok; Komárom-Esztergom; Nógrád; Pest; Somogy; Szabolcs-Szatmár-Bereg; Tolna; Vas; Veszprém; Zala

Website
- www.police.hu

The Rendőrség (Hungarian pronunciation: [ˈrɛndøːrʃeːɡ], English: Police, lit. 'Order Guardian') is the national civil law enforcement agency of Hungary and is governed by the Interior Ministry. It was formerly established under the Hungarian People's Republic in 1955, formally known as the Magyar Népköztársaság Rendőrsége (lit. 'Police of the Hungarian People's Republic').

From the establishment of the Hungarian People's Republic in 1949 to the democratic era after 1989, Hungary’s law enforcement institutions evolved significantly. During the socialist period, law enforcement was a tool of political repression under direct party control. After the fall of communism, democratic reforms led to the restructuring of police and internal security agencies, culminating in the emergence of modern institutions by the early 2000s.

== History ==
=== Socialist Era (1949–1989) ===
==== Regular Police (Rendőrség) ====
The Rendőrség (Police) served as Hungary’s primary law enforcement agency. Although tasked with typical duties such as crime prevention, investigations, and public order, it operated under the Ministry of Interior (Belügyminisztérium) and was heavily politicized. Officers were expected to uphold the ruling party’s ideology, and political loyalty often outweighed professional qualifications.

==== Államvédelmi Hatóság (ÁVH) ====
The ÁVH (State Protection Authority) functioned as Hungary’s secret police from 1945 to 1956. Modeled after the Soviet NKVD, it was responsible for suppressing dissent, conducting surveillance, staging show trials, and executing perceived enemies of the state. Its methods included torture, intimidation, and extrajudicial actions. The ÁVH became widely hated, and during the 1956 Revolution, its members were specifically targeted by protestors.

==== Department III/III ====
After the revolution and the dissolution of the ÁVH, internal security functions were transferred to the III/III Department within the Ministry of Interior. This department focused on domestic surveillance, infiltrating religious groups, universities, and dissident intellectual circles. It used a large network of informants and secret collaborators to monitor the population, continuing the repressive functions of its predecessor in a more discreet manner.

==== Control over Economy and Borders ====
During this period, economic crimes and customs violations were addressed by internal departments within the Ministry of Interior and the party-controlled State Office for Price Control and State Planning Office. Institutions like the NAV (Nemzeti Adó- és Vámhivatal, National Tax and Customs Administration) did not exist yet. Border control and smuggling enforcement were handled by the Border Guard (Határőrség), a separate military-style force until 2007.

=== Transition Period (1989–1994) ===
Following the peaceful transition to a multi-party democracy in 1989–1990, Hungary began overhauling its law enforcement and intelligence services:

- The Rendőrség was placed under democratic civilian control and restructured along Western models.
- The III/III Department and other internal surveillance bodies were disbanded.
- Files from the Communist secret police became accessible to historians and researchers, though debates over full transparency continued.
- New laws were passed to protect civil rights, limit police powers, and ensure judicial oversight.

The 1990s also saw the creation of specialized units within the police for organized crime, drug enforcement, and economic crimes, laying the groundwork for agencies like NAV.

=== Law Enforcement in the Early 2000s (1994–2006) ===
By the early 2000s, Hungary's police system had largely aligned with European standards, though challenges remained, particularly in corruption, efficiency, and public trust.

==== National Police Headquarters (ORFK) ====
The Országos Rendőr-főkapitányság (National Police Headquarters) served as the central command of the Hungarian Police, overseeing regional and specialized units. Within the ORFK, departments were formed to combat organized crime, human trafficking, cybercrime, and terrorism-related threats.

==== Financial and Customs Enforcement ====
The modern NAV did not exist yet, but its predecessor agencies—such as the Adó- és Pénzügyi Ellenőrzési Hivatal (APEH – Tax and Financial Control Administration) and the Vám- és Pénzügyőrség (Customs and Finance Guard)—handled taxation and customs enforcement.

These institutions were merged into NAV in 2011, but their roots trace back to post-communist financial oversight reforms in the 1990s.

==== Counter-Terrorism ====
Hungary did not have a dedicated counter-terrorism unit until after 2006. During this time, counter-terrorism operations were handled by specialized units within the police, often in coordination with international agencies like Interpol and Europol.

The Counter Terrorism Centre (TEK) was established only in 2010, following increasing global concern over terrorism and Hungary’s need for a rapid-response elite unit. Its creation was partly inspired by the 2006 protests and riots in Budapest, which highlighted the limitations of existing police capabilities.

=== 2006 Protests and Policing Crisis ===
In September–October 2006, massive protests erupted in Budapest following the leak of Prime Minister Ferenc Gyurcsány’s private speech admitting to government dishonesty. On October 23, 2006 (the 50th anniversary of the 1956 revolution), police used excessive force against peaceful demonstrators and bystanders.

The events triggered a national scandal and widespread criticism of police leadership, including allegations of:

- Arbitrary arrests
- Use of rubber bullets and tear gas
- Lack of identification on officers
- Political interference in policing

The crisis significantly eroded public trust in law enforcement and led to internal reforms. It also influenced the later decision to form TEK in 2010 and to reorganize parts of the police. Until 2006, the police operated under the authority of the Ministry of Interior. From 2006 to 2010, the Ministry of Justice and Law Enforcement was the governing body of the police, which absorbed the Border Guard on December 31, 2007.

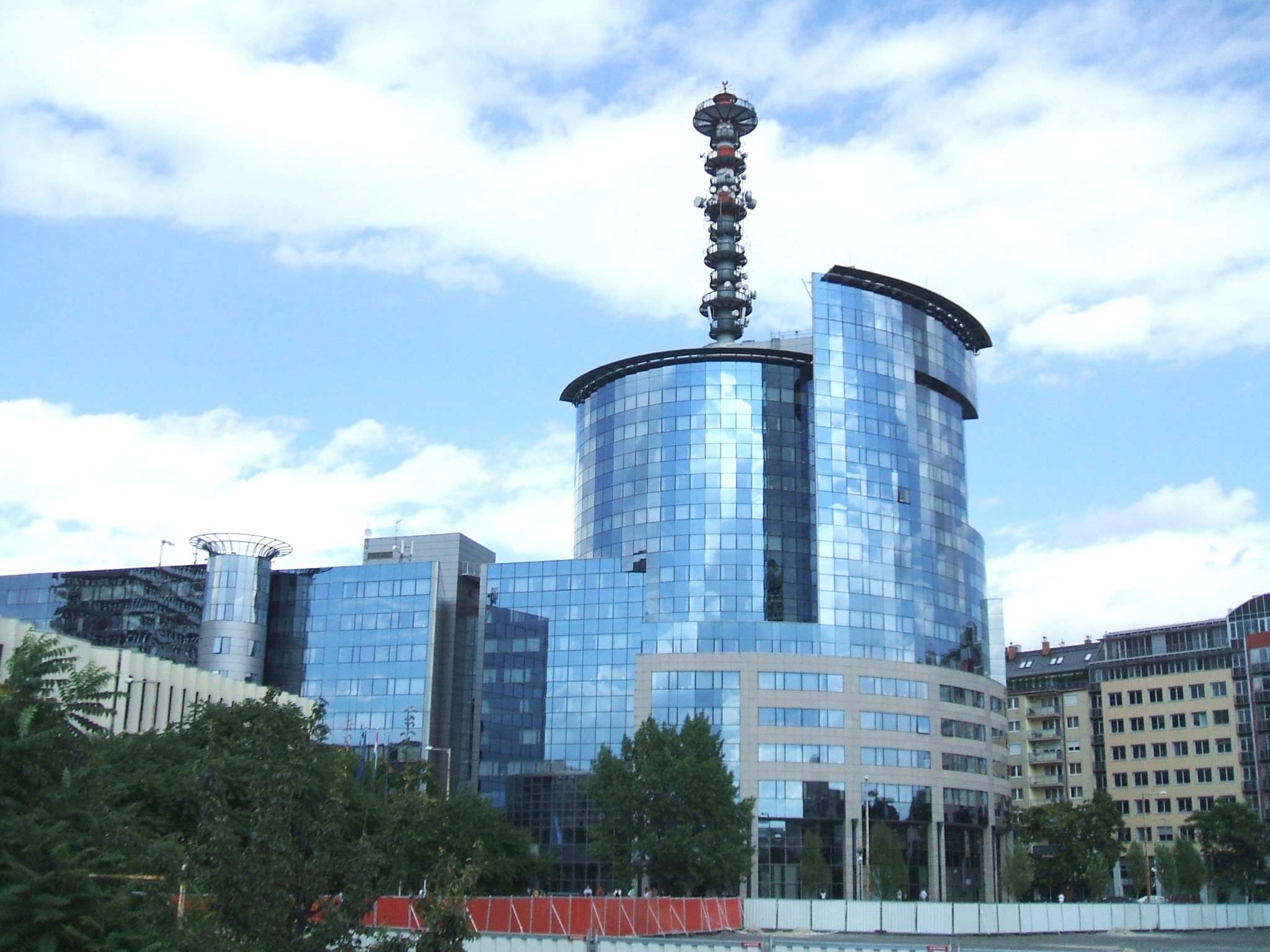
Headquarters of The Police in Budapest

In 2010, the government reinstated the Interior Ministry.

The police have national headquarters in the capital but otherwise operate through its county commands. Other national bodies include the National Bureau of Investigation (modeled after the FBI), Counter-terrorism Centre (TEK, an elite commando of heavily armed officers), and KR (Riot police and Rapid Response Unit, Propaganda bureau a civil law enforcement agency).

On July 1, 2010, the government decided to set up the Counter-terrorism Center, which was responsible for preventing terrorist attacks, protecting government officials, and serving as an intelligence service. In 2011, the government established the Office for the Protection of the Constitution (AH), the Counter-terrorism Center, the National Security Service (NBSZ), and the National Defense Service (NVSZ). The Interior Ministry governs all of these new agencies.

On July 1, 2012, the government disbanded the Republican Regiment, which was responsible for protecting government officials.

== Agencies under the police ==
The Customs and Finance Guard is under the control of the Ministry of Finance, which is the successor for both the Tax and Financial Control Office and the National Tax and Customs Office (NAV.)

The Directorate-General for Crime is a separate tax police within the NAV that investigates financial crimes.

Other law enforcement agencies include the Prisons Enforcement Agency, the Disaster Protection Agency, and the Parliamentary Guard. The Ministry of Interior controls both the Counter-terrorism Center and the controversial National Defense Service.

The Office for the Protection of the Constitution usually does secret investigations on organized crime groups that threaten national security. However, it is also starting to arrest people.

Former logo of the Border Guard

On January 1, 2008, the parliament passed an amendment that merged the Border Guard into the National Police and transferred Border Guard's property, vehicles, and other assets to the National Police.

The National Police later established the Border Police Department, which secures the border by detecting and preventing illegal immigration.

The Hungarian Emergency Police is the Riot Police Unit, used for crowd control.

== Workforce statistics of selected law enforcement agencies ==
Organization	Employees
Police (Rendőrség)	44,923
Counter-terrorism Center (Terrorelhárítási Központ)	400–600
National Defense Service (Nemzeti Védelmi Szolgálat)	415
National Security Service (Nemzetbiztonsági Szakszolgálat)	~2000
Office for the Protection of the Constitution (Alkotmányvédelmi Hivatal)	~1200

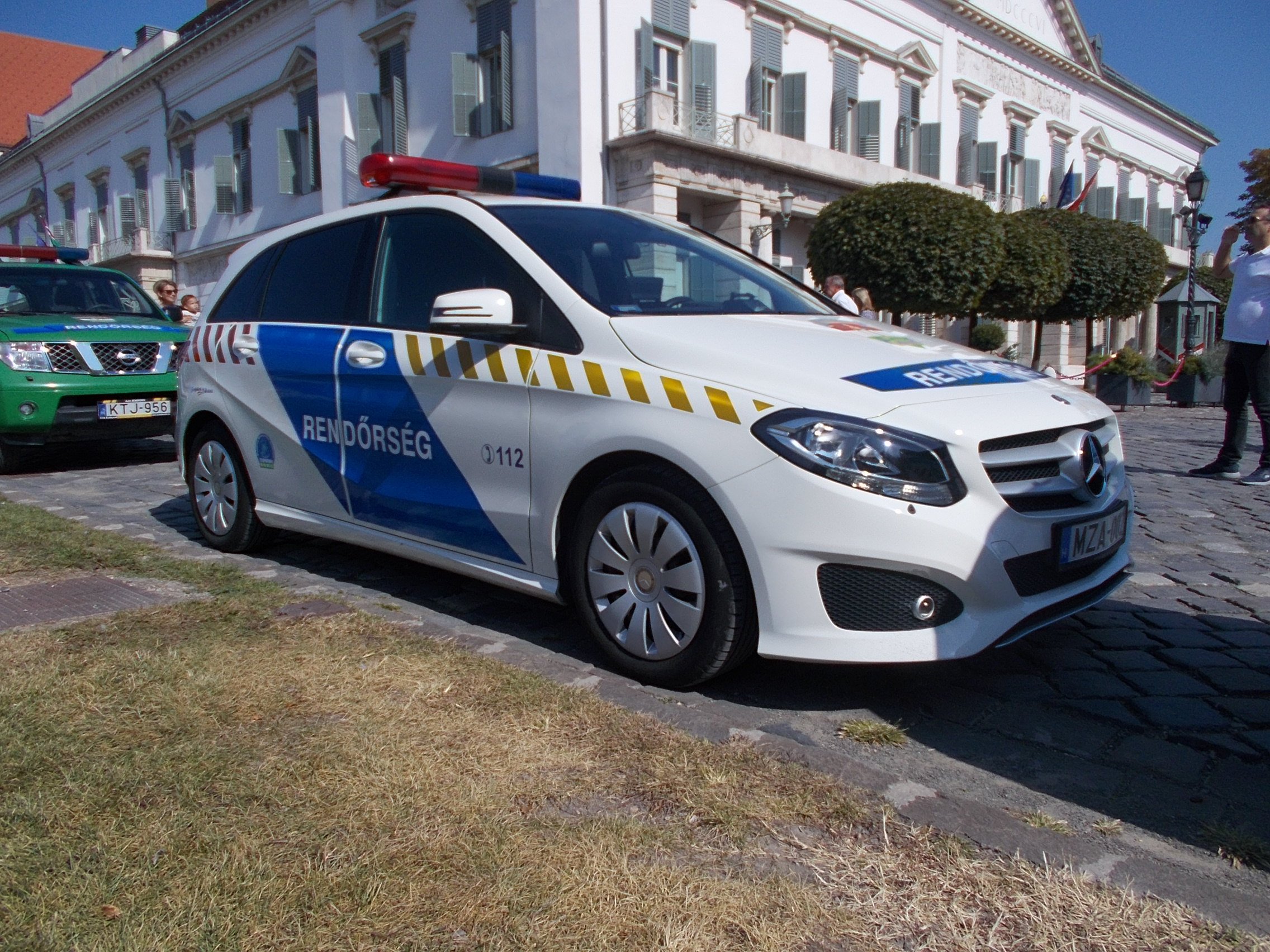
Mercedes-Benz B-Class Patrol Car

== Ranks ==
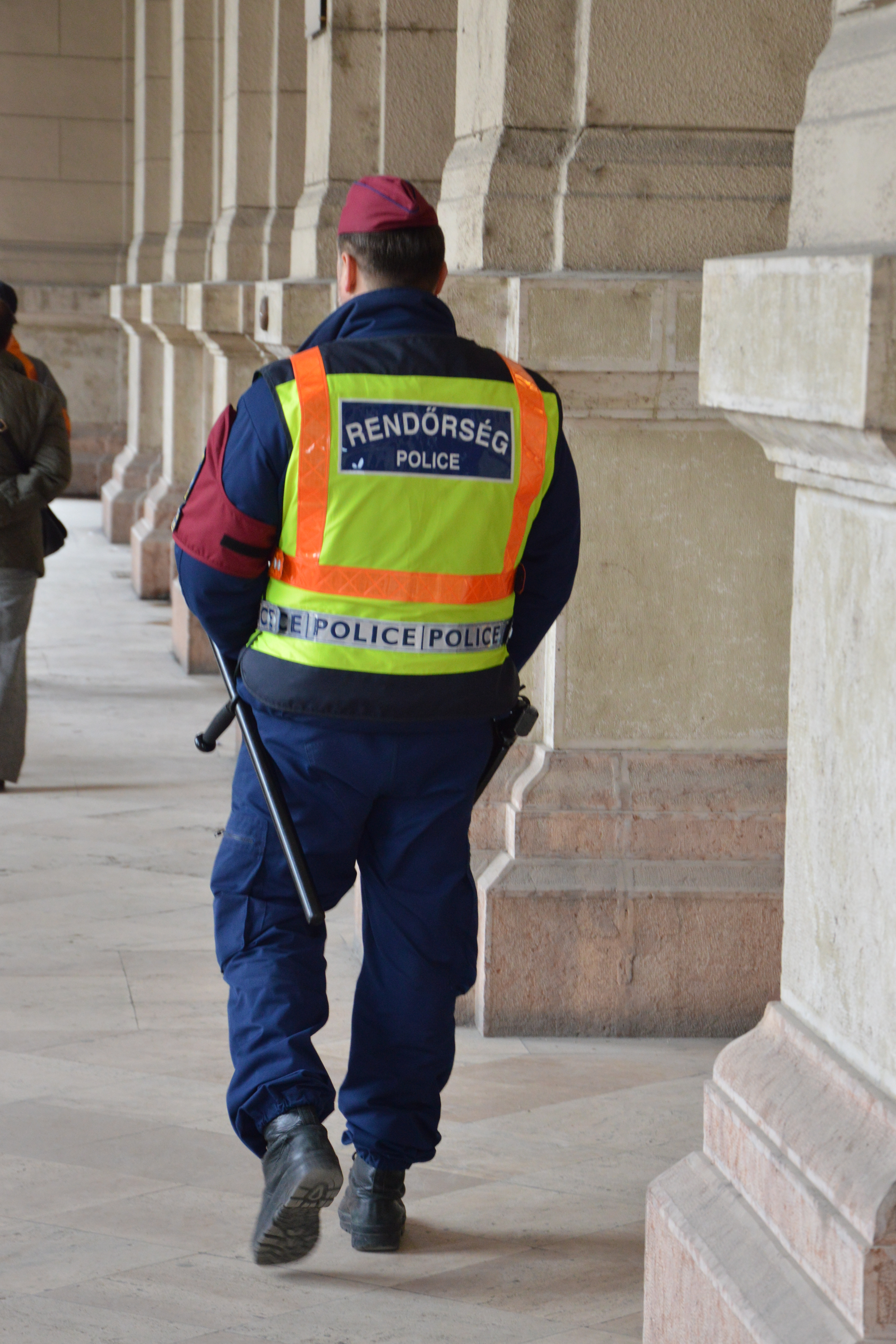
This picture shows a police officer in Budapest wearing a burgundy cap, which indicates his status as a member of the Rapid Response Unit (KR.) Members of this unit sometimes also wear a burgundy armband. The government usually uses the KR to restore civil order on the streets.

Officers

Rank group	General / flag officers				Senior officers			Junior officers
(Hungary) Rendőrség	No equivalent										No insignia
(Hungary) Rendőrség	No equivalent	Altábornagy; Lieutenant general	Vezérőrnagy; Major general	Dandártábornok; Brigadier general	Ezredes; Colonel	Alezredes; Lieutenant colonel	Őrnagy; Major	Százados; Captain	Főhadnagy; First lieutenant	Hadnagy; Second lieutenant	Honvédtisztjelölt

Others

Rank group	Senior NCOs						Junior NCOs	Enlisted
(Hungary) Rendőrség							No equivalent
(Hungary) Rendőrség	Főtörzszászlós; Chief warrant officer	Törzszászlós; Master warrant officer	Zászlós; Warrant officer	Főtörzsőrmester; Sergeant first class	Törzsőrmester; Staff sergeant	Őrmester; Sergeant	No equivalent

== Equipment ==
Model	Origin	Type
TT-30	Soviet Union	Semi-automatic pistol
Makarov	Soviet Union	Semi-automatic pistol
CZ P-07	Czech Republic	Semi-automatic pistol
CZ P-09	Czech Republic	Semi-automatic pistol
CZ 75 SP-01 Tactical	Czech Republic	Semi-automatic pistol
FEG P9R	Hungary	Semi-automatic pistol
Jericho 941	Israel	Semi-automatic pistol
Heckler & Koch USP	Germany	Semi-automatic pistol
Heckler & Koch MP5	Germany	Submachine gun
IMI Uzi	Israel	Submachine gun
AMD-65	Hungary	Assault rifle
Dragunov SVD	Soviet Union	Sniper rifle
Gepárd	Hungary	Sniper rifle
Unique Alpine TPG-1	France	Sniper rifle
PKM	Soviet Union	Machine gun

== Current vehicles ==
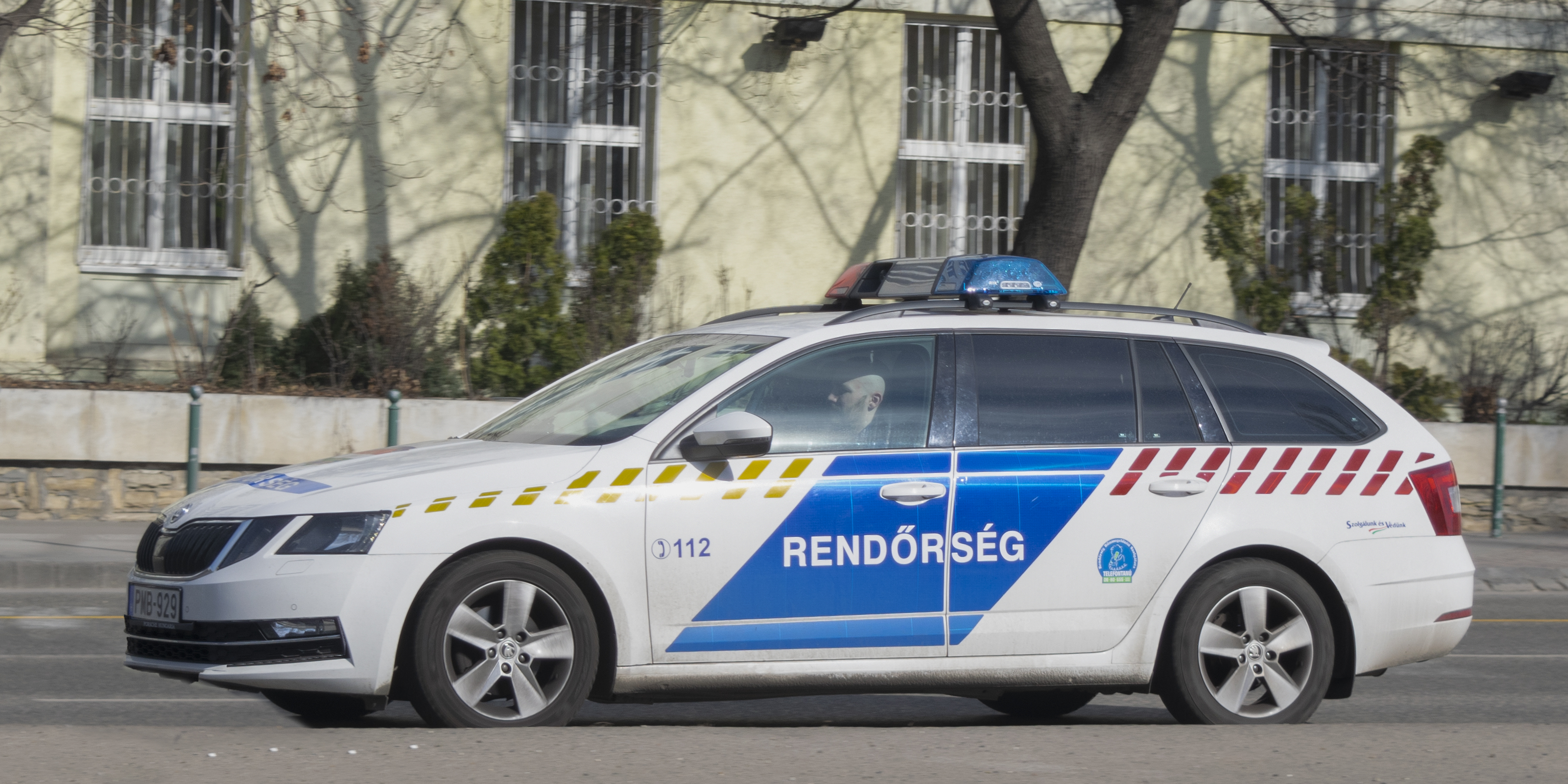
Škoda Octavia III

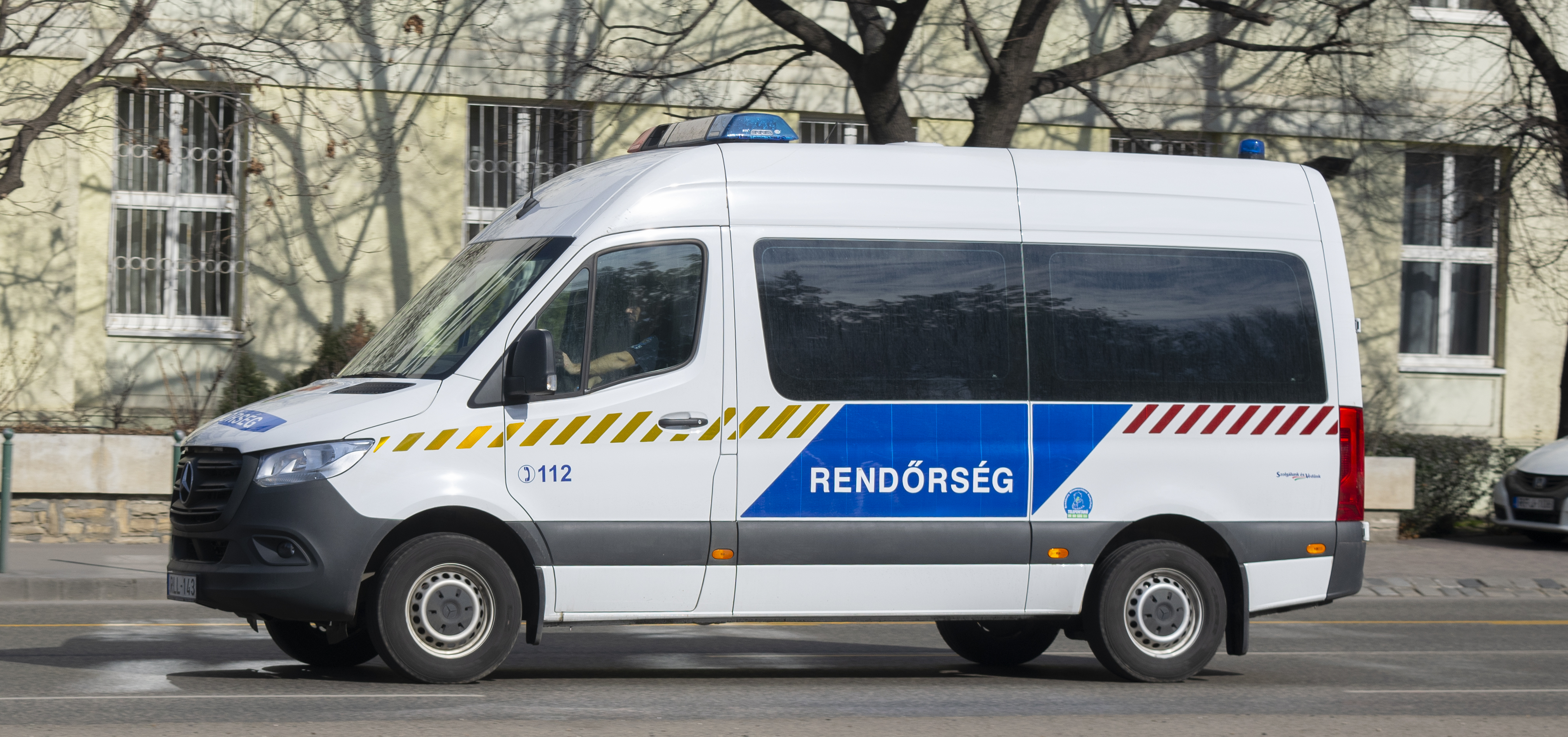
Mercedes Sprinter III

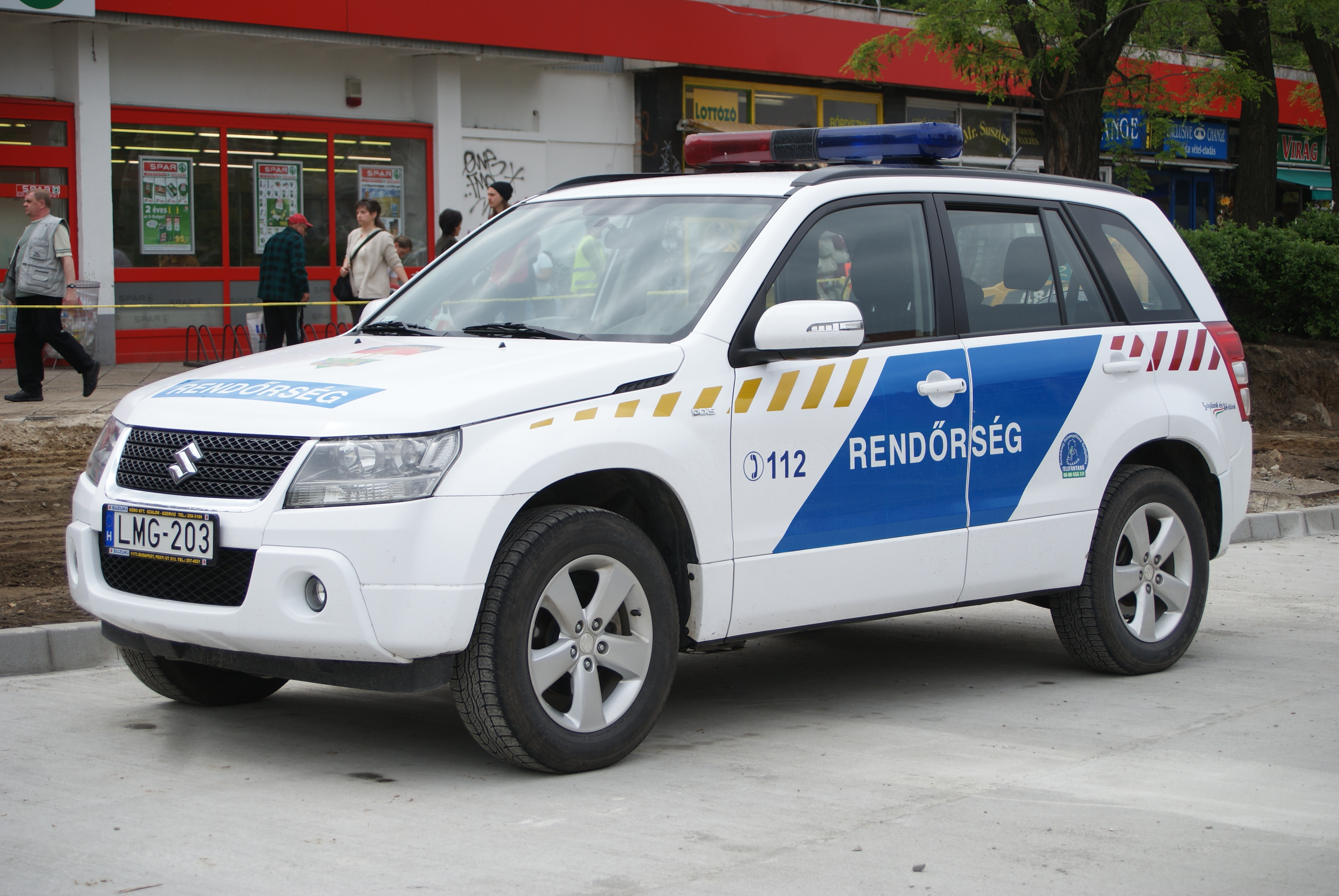
Suzuki Grand Vitara

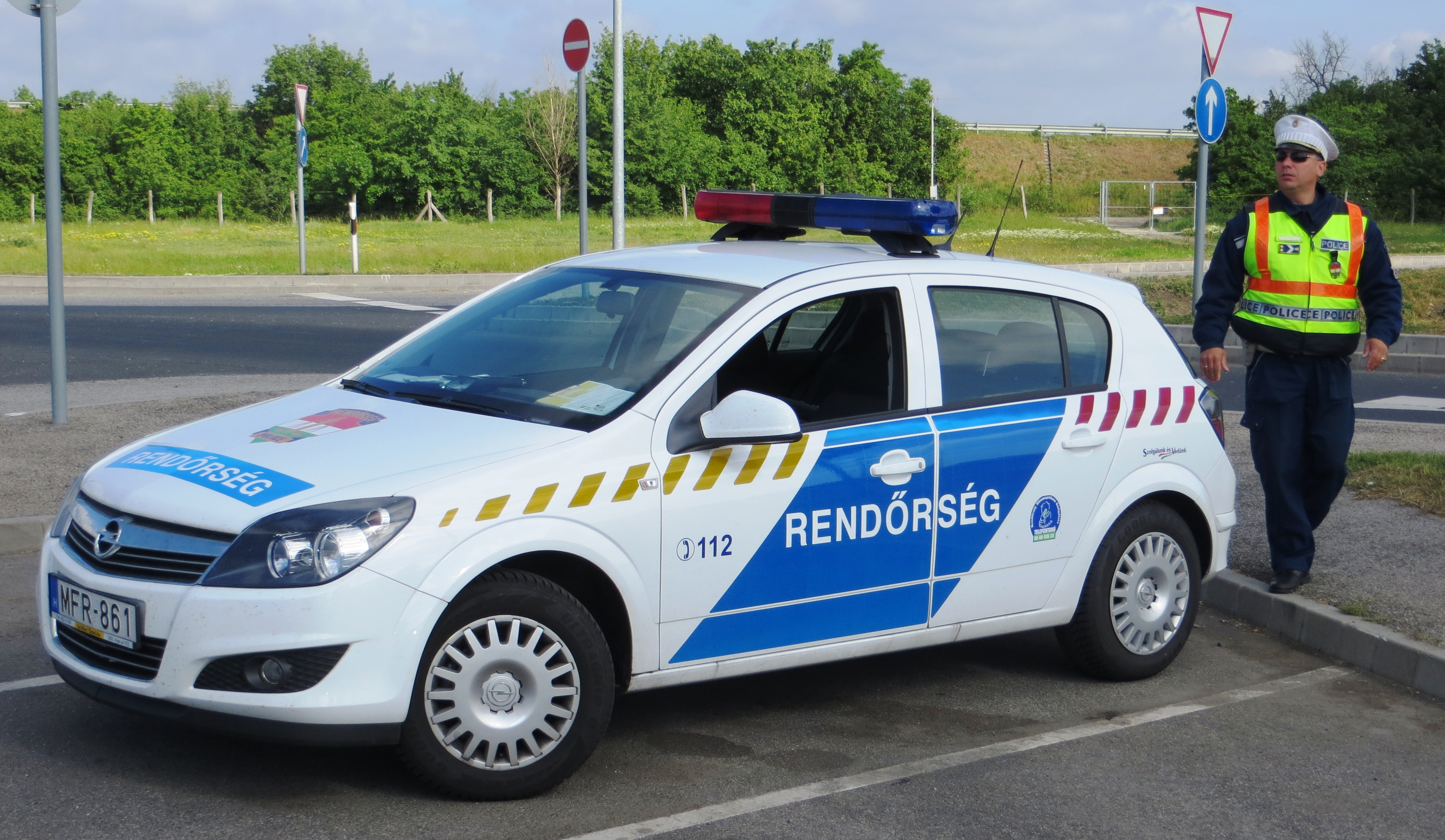
Opel Astra H

- Dacia Duster
- Audi A3
- Audi A6 Avant
- Audi A4
- Audi TT
- BMW R1200RT
- Mercedes-Benz B-Class
- Mercedes-Benz E-Class
- Mercedes-Benz Sprinter
- Mercedes-Benz Vito
- Nissan Pathfinder
- Nissan Patrol
- Opel Astra
- Opel Vivaro
- Škoda Octavia
- Skoda Octavia RS
- Škoda Superb
- Škoda Yeti
- Suzuki Vitara
- Volkswagen Amarok
- Volkswagen Transporter
- Volkswagen Caddy
- Yamaha FJR1300
- Mil Mi-2
- MD Helicopters MD 500
- MD Helicopters MD 902

== Retired vehicles ==
- Lada 2101
- Lada 2105
- Lada 2107

== See also ==
- Law Enforcement and Public Safety Service
