= SAPCA =

SAPCA (Persian: سپکا, acronym officially standing for Crowd Control Police Dogs, Persian: سگ‌های پلیس کنترل اجتماعات and Iran Detectives Police Dogs, Persian: سگ‌های پلیس کارآگاهان ایران;) is the search and rescue and police dog unit of Law Enforcement Command of Islamic Republic of Iran and a subdivision of its Special Units Command. The unit was established in 2013.
