= Counter-terrorism Special Force =

Iranian police tactical unit

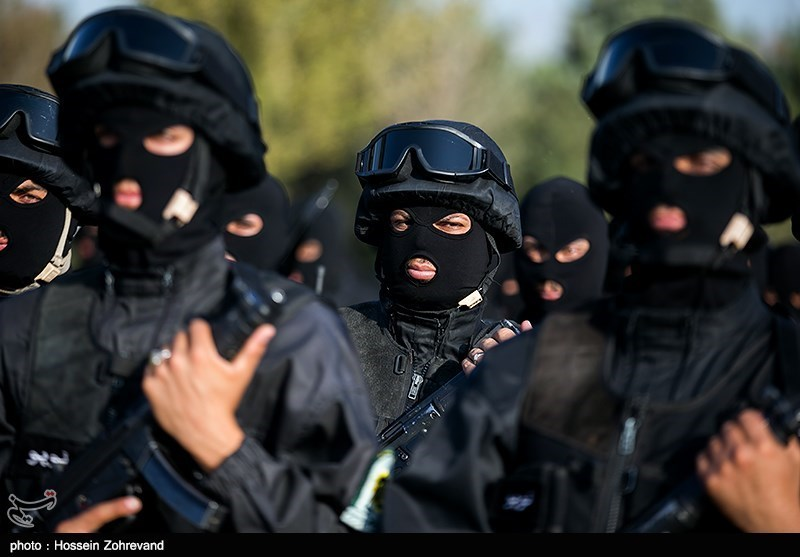
NOPO members

NOPO (Persian: نوپو), officially standing for Counter-terrorism Special Force (Persian: نیروی ویژه پاد وحشت, romanized: Nīrū-yi Vizhe-yi Pād Vahshat), is an Iranian riot police force acting under Amīr al-Mu'minīn Unit of the Special Units Command, and is responsible for serious human rights violations in Iran.

NOPO's duty is usually mentioned as hostage rescue, but it is argued that the unit is a riot police, as it was involved in Iran student protests, July 1999 according to a report by Supreme National Security Council, as well as the violent suppression of the 2019 protests, and the Mahsa Amini protests of 2022.

The NOPO acronym had been claimed to be an acronym for "Wilayat Guardian Special Force" (Persian: نیروی ویژه پاسدار ولایت, romanized: Nīrū-yi Vizhe-yi Pāsdār-i Vilāyat) by reformist media in late 1990s; the association was denied.

== History ==
The operational history of the Anti-Terror Special Forces includes deployments against internal security threats, and is often called upon to suppress protests.

After large-scale protests in 1993 and 1994, NAJA reorganised riot-control capabilities and established the Counterterrorism Special Force in 1996.

After the controversial election of Mahmoud Ahmedinejad in 2009, NOPO played a major role in the post-election forceful crackdown of the resulting nation-wide protests.

During the 2019 protests in Iran over rising gasoline prices, the NOPO unit reportedly fired automatic weapons at unarmed protesters, including women and children. It was also reported that they blocked roads, and using heavy machine guns, fired live ammunition at the assembled crowds at random. Hundreds of protesters were reportedly killed.

During the 2022-2023 Mahsa Amini protests NOPO similarly used "excessive violence and lethal force against unarmed protestors, including women and children", again by firing automatic weapons at them.

During the 2026 Iran war, by 2 March, according to the wife of Mostafa Mohammadhasan, a political prisoner in Evin Prison, NOPO had taken over control of the prison from the usual prison staff.

== Sanctions ==
In 2021, the US Treasury Department imposed sanctions on NOPO for its part in committing "serious human rights abuses against persons in Iran or Iranian citizens or residents, or the family members of the foregoing."

In 2023, the European Union implemented restrictive measures on NOPO for using "excessive violence and lethal force against unarmed protestors" adding that it was "responsible for serious human rights violations in Iran".
