= Iranian Police Special Units =

Special Units Command
- فرماندهی یگان‌های ویژه فراجا
- Seal of Special Units Command
- Active: 1991-present
- Country: Iran
- Branch: Police Command of the Islamic Republic of Iran
- Role: Riot police, police tactical unit
- Garrison/HQ: Tehran
- Nickname: YEGUP

Commanders
- Current commander: Brigadier general Masoud Mosaddegh
- Notable commanders: Mojtaba Abdollahi

Insignia
- Insignia of Special Units

The Special Units Command (Persian: فرماندهی یگان‌های ویژه فراجا, romanized: Yegānhā-ye vīzheh-ye pāsdārān), acronymed YEGUP (یگوپ), is a subdivision of the Police Command of the Islamic Republic of Iran in charge of its special units.

The Special Units were involved in the post-election protest suppression in 2009 and have forcefully put down multiple nationwide protests.

According to identifications carried out by opposition sources, Special Units wear black military uniforms.

== History ==
Iranian Police Special Units were established in 1991, after the disbanding of the previous law enforcement forces and the establishment of the then-Law Enforcement Force of the Islamic Republic of Iran.

The Special Units, with roots in the Islamic Revolution Committees, were led by Mojtaba Abdollahi from their establishment until 2012.

The Special were deployed for the first time in Mashhad in 1992. In 1994, the Special Units quelled riots in Qazvin, and in 1995 they confronted a major protest by bus and truck drivers in Eslamshahr. In 1999 Special Units were involved in confronting the 1999 protest movement.

The disputed 2009 Iranian presidential election led to the 2009 Iranian presidential election protests and to the massive deployment of Special Units.

In 2012, Mojtaba Abdollahi left the command to Second Brigadier General Hassan Karami. During massive nationwide protests that rocked Iran between December 2017 and January 2018, the Special Units were again massively deployed.

In on 7 December 2021, Iranian Police Special Units were sanctioned by the United States.

=== Brutality and massacres ===
The Special Unit has been described as the "most repressive anti-riot force of the Islamic Republic”. The history of the unit roughly corresponds to the span of street uprisings during the Islamic Republic. While the affiliated committees had gained notoriety for arrests, raids on private parties, and street checkpoints, the Special Unit transformed all these activities into armed confrontations with protesters and critics—into shootings and massacres of such people in the streets. According to statistics from organizations such as Amnesty International, at least 304 people were killed by security forces in just three days during the November 2019 protests, and the forces deployed by the government to the streets were mostly members of the Special Unit and plainclothes agents. By 2021, the Special Unit of the Law Enforcement Command had taken part in eight major crackdowns on protests. In one of the bloodiest street suppressions in the history of the Islamic Republic, which occurred over just three days between November 15 and 17, 2019, the Special Unit was the principal force deployed to the streets for repression. Esmaeil Ahmadi-Moghaddam, former commander of the Law Enforcement Force, stated that during the Tasua and Ashura demonstrations of 2009 by supporters of the Green Movement, a police vehicle ran over civilians.

These killings and acts of violence have been accompanied by human rights sanctions. For instance, in April 2021, Hassan Karami, commander of the Special Units of Iran’s Law Enforcement Force (NAJA); Hossein Ashtari, commander of the Law Enforcement Command of the Islamic Republic; Gholamreza Ziaei, head of Evin Prison; and several others were added to the European Union’s human rights sanctions list for their role in the violent suppression of the November 2019 protests in Iran.

On the other hand, in August 2014, Hassan Karami, commander of the Special Units of Iran’s Law Enforcement Force, acknowledged that “mistakes” had been committed by the Special Unit during the post-election protests of 2009. Karami described the “non-popular nature of the Special Units” as the reason for these “incidents.” In one video released on the internet, Special Unit officers are seen attacking a civilian vehicle with batons, until another officer (apparently from a different agency) intervenes to stop them.

==== Other reports ====
- In June 2020, residents of the Gheyzaniyeh district in Khuzestan Province gathered in front of the district governor’s office to protest the lack of water and the negligence of the district office and managers, and then blocked the old Ahvaz–Mahshahr road. Following the protest, the Law Enforcement Force and the Special Unit intervened and carried out a “severe” crackdown on the demonstrators. Images were published showing injuries to some protesters’ legs as a result of the gunfire.
- In October 2020, a large number of mourners for Shajarian, the Iranian musician and singer, gathered in front of Jam Hospital. After some time, as the crowd’s chants took on a political tone, Special Unit forces attacked the mourners.
- In May 2021, it was reported that Special Unit forces, under the pretext of “reclaiming national lands,” raided the homes and orchards of residents in the villages of the Kuhman area and Dartang-e Olya of Alishtar, Lorestan Province, prompting local protests; the forces opened fire on the people, wounding a number of them. Elsewhere it was stated that gunfire by the Special Unit and the Law Enforcement Force at residents of Dartang-e Olya resulted in several injuries. Videos that circulated showed repeated shooting by officers and, subsequently, several villagers wounded; in one of the images, people can be seen throwing stones at the forces.

=== Sexual Violence Against Protesters ===
Following the nationwide protests of 2022 and the death of Mahsa Amini, several human rights researchers reported that the Special Unit systematically used sexual violence against detained protesters. A December 2023 report by Amnesty International documented multiple cases in which detainees were subjected to sexual assault, including gang rape, during arrest, inside transport vehicles, and within detention facilities. These abuses affected both women and men, including minors, and involved severe sexual torture.

One detainee, named Zahra, told Amnesty International that while inside a van operated by the Special Unit, an officer pulled down her pants in the presence of other female prisoners and raped her. She added that she witnessed another officer ordering two handcuffed women in the same van to perform oral sexual acts, and when one of the women refused, the officer dragged her out of the van by her hair. Independent investigations found that these violations were not isolated incidents but part of a deliberate strategy by the Special Unit to punish, intimidate, and humiliate protesters, with sexual violence employed as a deliberate tool of repression.

=== Deliberate and systematic shooting at protesters' eyes ===
During the 2022 Iran uprising, the Islamic Republic systematically and deliberately wounded hundreds of people in the streets of Iran with pellet and paintball bullets. Now, more than a year later, protesters injured in their eyes continue to suffer in agony, left without proper medication or treatment, enduring what can be described as torture.

==== Reports ====
- Mohammad Hossein Erfan, 24 years old, on September 21, 2023, shared a photo on his Instagram of a map of Iran in black, with the names of those killed in the 2022 protests written in blood-red ink. He wrote, "I wish the next tear is one of joy." Mohammad Hossein passed away on February 19, 2024, due to an infection in both of his eyes, which had been blinded by pellet gunshots in November 2019. The pellets, fired by security forces suppressing the protests, tortured Mohammad Hossein for four years, and no doctor, hospital, or medication could save him from the constant pain and the looming threat of death. On his Instagram bio, where people usually write a short description about themselves, Mohammad Hossein had written, "Do not see this winter, we too had a spring." In the last photo on his Instagram, it was written: "The trigger was pulled by someone who had orders from a villain... Damn the hand that pulled the trigger."
- Parsa Ghavadi, 18 years old, lost both of his eyes on the night of November 21, 2022, during the protests in Kermanshah, when security forces shot him with pellet gunshots. In an interview with Iran International, he says: “The pellets are inside my skull, close to my brain, each one about three centimeters away from my eyeball. The security forces targeted my pupil, cornea, and retina, all of which were pierced.” On September 3, 2023, just before the anniversary of Mahsa Jina Amini's death, and during a time when the government was arresting families seeking justice out of fear of street protests, Parsa was arrested. He recounts: "I was arrested in my father’s shop and taken to solitary confinement in Dizelabad prison in Kermanshah. There, under torture, because I didn’t say that 'Salam Commander' had been sung for Khamenei, they chained my legs and hung me from the ceiling, beating me for hours." After 17 days in solitary confinement and four days in the general prison, he was released on heavy bail. To avoid further arrest, he left Iran. Speaking about his situation in Turkey, Parsa says: "Since my passport expired, I couldn’t leave the house for fear of being deported, and my eye drops had run out. My eye pressure rose, and when I arrived in Germany, I was immediately hospitalized. The doctor said if I had come a few days later, my eye would have burst." He constantly emphasizes that since the day his eye was shot, he has not experienced a single day without pain: "I go about my daily tasks, but the pain is always with me. My right eye has 40% vision and my left eye has 15%. I have had 10 surgeries on my eyes, and if this last surgery doesn't succeed, I will have to remove my left eye."
- Mohammad Hossein Liriayi, a 34-year-old young man, was blinded in both eyes by pellet gunshots fired by security forces during the May 2021 protests in Dorud, Iran. An informed source told Iran International about his condition: "He has been blind for 22 months, and after undergoing initial treatment, he has not been able to regain even a small portion of his vision." The source also mentioned that Mohammad Liriayi has been banned from leaving the country and has no hope for treatment outside Iran. They added, "In addition to his eyes, Mohammad has seventy pellet bullets lodged in his body, which have become infected, and due to a lack of financial resources, he has been unable to seek appropriate treatment for them." The source also described the day Mohammad was injured on a street in Dorud: "Mohammad was standing at a corner of the street, among the protesters, when suddenly government forces arrived and shot him with pellet guns, hitting his eyes and body."
- Ghazal Ranjkash, Hossein Nouriniko, Doaa Mousavi, Mohammad Farzi, Niloufar Aghaei, and Matin Hosseini were all shot by government forces across different parts of Iran and are currently undergoing treatment. One of them, still in Iran, told Iran International: "For a long time, we were not provided with medication. Our medicine was not delivered to the pharmacy so that we could be tortured with our pain. We face pressure, eye pain, and constant suffering every day." Amir Shah-Valayi, Hossein Jafari, Ali Zarei, Matin Hosseini, and Hossein Hosseinpour were protesters who were deliberately blinded by government forces and were detained for long periods. In prison, they were tortured by being denied their medications.

== Role ==
The Iranian police special units command groups units and organizations tasked with crowd and riot control and protest suppression. They also assist territorial or other specialist police units.

== Organisation ==
The Special Units Command consists of riot units as well as of specialist units for hostage rescue, mounted police, riot police, police dog, airborne, etc.

The Special Units Command headquarters are in Tehran, and its commander is Brigadier General Hasan Karami since 2012. The number of Special Units Command troops has never been disclosed. According to Brigadier General Karami, 20,000 troops were deployed to provide security to the Arba'een ceremony in 2019.

Individual special units throughout Iran depend on the Special Units Command for administrative and training purposes. Nearly half of the personnel of the Special Units are based in Tehran, either in the national-level units and in the Tehran provincial Special Unit.

=== National-level units ===
There are three Special Units with tasks extending to the whole Iranian territory. These units have names dwawn from Shia tradition: Mûsâ ibn Ja‘far, Imam Hussein, and Amīr al-Mu'minīn.

- 1st Amir al-Momenin Brigade: based in Tehran;
- 2nd Musa Bin Jafar Brigade: based in Tehran;
- 3rd Imam Hossein Brigade: based in Tehran.

==== 1st Amir al-Momenin Brigade ====
The 1st Amir al-Momenin Brigade is considered the premier Special Unit within FARAJA. The operational jurisdiction is the whole national territory of Iran. Its headquarters are in Afsarieh, Tehran. Currently, the command of the 1st Amir al-Momenin Brigade is under the responsibility of Colonel Yahya Hasikhani.

=== Territorial organization ===
A Special unit exists in all the 31 provinces of Iran. The special unit is under the operational control of the police command of the relevant province and, in terms of training and general command, under the national-level command.

In Tehran area, the special units are under the operational control of the police command in charge for Greater Tehran. There are three units based in Tehran:

- 4th Imam Khomeini Brigade: based in Tehran, its operational area is Greater Tehran;
- Special unit of the special police command in the West of Tehran province (Shahriar);
- Special unit of special police command of East Tehran province (Javadabad and Varamin).

=== Subordinate units ===
Under the Iranian Police Special Units Command there are some specialist units:

- Police tactical unit: Counter-terrorism Special Force (NOPO);
- Mounted police (ASVARAN), established in 2013;
- K-9 unit: Crowd Control Police Dogs (SAPCA), established in 2013.
- Women's unit, established in 2013;
- Police paratroopers unit;
- Explosive Disposal Unit.

== Operational approach ==
The operational approach of the Special Units is complex and it involves and integrated cooperation with other branches, as well as other governmental or quasi-governmental organizations. Overall, the ultimate aim is to anticipate and prevent, or neutralise, protests and their potential harm.

Riot-control operations are organised according the intelligence-led policing model, with special attention placed on demography and geography of the target areas, as well as potential tactical threats posed by the operation with specific regard to the operational area itself.

According to Brigadier General Hassan Karami, then-Commander of the Special Units Command, the tactical approach of riot police forces is to conduct ostensive patrols while fully equipped and deployed for engagement with rioters and protesters. This approach is aimed to lower the protesters' morale and resolve to confront police.

The cooperation with other organizations, such as the Basij, is key to perform plainclothes infiltration and snatch arrests of the riot leaders.

== Ideology of the Special Units ==
The Special Units Command is one of the most ideologized in the Iranian armed forces. According to Prague-based journalist Behnam Gholipour, field commanders motivate actions of their subordinate personnel by using religious justifications.

== See also ==
- Iran protests
- Islamic Revolution Committees
