= ASVARAN =

Iranian mounted police force

ASVARAN (Persian: اسواران; officially blend word for "Asb Savaran", Persian: اسب‌سواران, Hoursemounters; the word Asvaran itself also means Cavalries) is the mounted police unit of Law Enforcement Command of Islamic Republic of Iran and a subdivision of its Special Units Command. The unit specializes in crowd control and riot control.

The mounted police, part of the Iranian Police Special Units, was established in 2013, following the reorganisation after the suppression of the Green Movement.

== See also ==
- Aswaran, cavalry unit in the Sassanian army
