= Intervention Police (Hungary) =

Intervention Police Készenléti Rendőrség
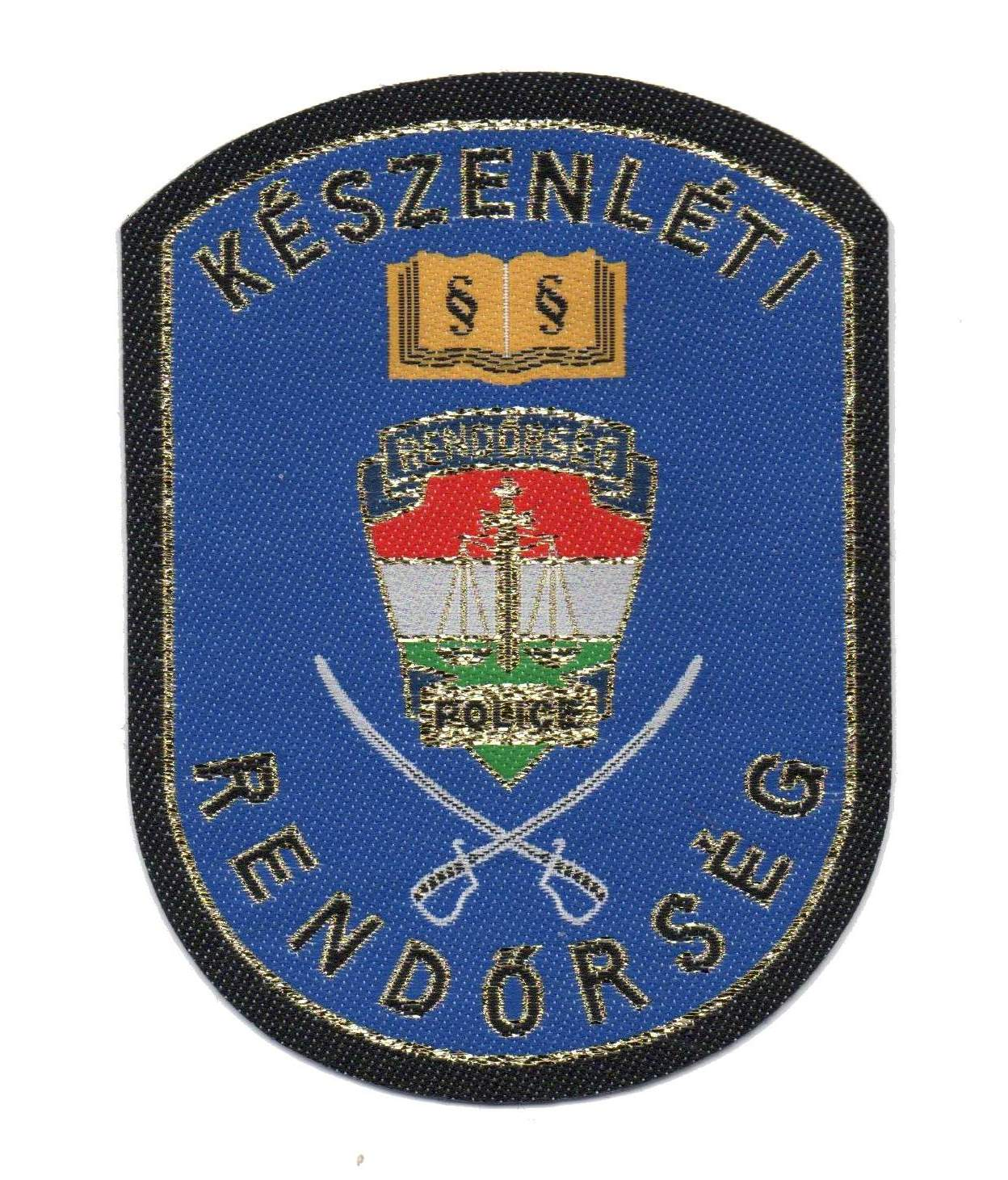

Agency overview
- Formed: 1948
- Preceding agency: Internal Troops of Hungary

Jurisdictional structure
- Operations jurisdiction: Hungary
- Governing body: Ministry of Interior
- General nature: Gendarmerie; Civilian police

Operational structure
- Headquarters: Budapest
- Parent agency: Police of Hungary

Intervention Police (Hungarian: Készenléti Rendőrség); also translated as Reaction Police, Response Police and Emergency Police, is the principal tactical unit and gendarmerie force of the Police of Hungary, dedicated to deal with serious crimes, riots and crowd control. The modern Intervention Police units trace their origin to the Interior Ministry Forces (Belügyminisztérium Karhatalma), known colloquially as Internal Forces (BM Belső Karhatalom).

== History ==
During the existence of Kingdom of Hungary, the principal gendarmerie force was the Royal Hungarian Gendarmerie. They were disbanded following the end of World War II and the establishment of the Hungarian People's Republic. The first Internal Troops units were formed in 1949 as part of the State Protection Authority. These units ensured order and security of government buildings and strategic installations, personal protection of state officials, protection of public transport and Prisoners escort. In addition to performing security, guarding and armed forces tasks, they participated in the search for and capture of fugitives and border violators, in the prevention of natural disasters, in the elimination of harmful consequences, and in ensuring the fulfilment of mandatory reporting. A police and a guard battalion were established in Budapest in 1949–1950, and guard squadrons were established in six county seats, in the big cities and in key facilities. During the 1953 reform it was transferred to the Ministry of Interior and called Internal Troops (Hungarian: BM Belső Karhatalom). On October 21, 1954, the Minister of the Interior ordered the establishment of a 350-person armed forces battalion and subordinate to the head of the Budapest department of the Ministry of Interior, which consisted of three companies and a motorcycle platoon.

In October 1956 it actively participated in the Hungarian Revolution. On 30 October 1956, the Nagy government ordered the disbandment of the Internal Troops Division of the Interior Ministry (Hungarian: BM Belső Karhatalom Hadosztály), yet during the suppression of the rebellion, scattered units of the division fought on the side of the Soviet troops. In the aftermath of the failure of the uprising the units were again reorganized and the legal basis to their activities was laid by a law adopted by the Hungarian parliament in May 1957 on the basis of the Presidential Council resolution. In 1957, in accordance with decree 25/1957 issued on 5 July 1957, the Internal Troops were organized under the Interior Troops Command (Hungarian: BM Karhatalmi Parancsnokság). In the period that followed the number of security units increased and by 1962 included 2 security regiments, 5 security battalions and a motorized company. Furthermore, in 1962, 4 artillery and 8 anti-tank batteries, an engineer company and 7 chemical protection platoons were created. During 1963–1967, the 2nd Security Regiment was transformed into the 6th Battalion.

In September 1973, based on the resolution of the National Defense Committee and in accordance with a decree No. 16/1973 of 11 September 1973 signed by the Minister of Interior, Internal Forces were reformed into the Intervention Police Regiment (Hungarian: Készenléti Rendőri Ezred) and the Internal Troops Command was abolished. The new regulations reaffirmed the unit's responsibility for solving internal security task, and if needed it could be supplemented by the Workers' Militia and the Hungarian People's Army.

The 1973 regulations gave the unit the following responsibilities:

- Preventing and suppressing internal hostile activity;
- Restoring order in the event of a major disruption of public order and public safety;
- Search and capture of armed enemies or persons suspected of serious crimes, who have escaped from custody, or who are wanted;
- Search for missing persons and objects in cases of outstanding importance;
- Major public security operations;
- Public security patrol service;
- Securing the travel of party and state leaders by rail and road;
- Ensuring the safety of the scene of a mass accident or major natural disaster and the smooth running of rescue operations, in maintaining public order and public safety;
- Securing major political, cultural and sports events.

As part of professionalization efforts, in the 70s and 80s officers of the command staff who graduated from military colleges participated in a six-month retraining, while the others acquired law enforcement knowledge at the Police Officers' College of the Ministry of the Interior. In 1981 the unit's name changed to the Revolutionary Reaction Police (Hungarian: BM Forradalmi Rendőri Ezred). A decree issued in 1983 by the minister of interior further specified the unit's responsibilities. On November 24, 1986, the Revolutionary Intervention Police Regiment was awarded the Order of the Red Star by the Presidential Council of the Hungarian People's Republic on the fifteenth anniversary of its existence.

On 1 July 2012, the Republic Guard Regiment with its 1,200 personnel, was merged into the Emergency Police.

== Duties and operations ==
The Hungarian Intervention Police is an organized and trained in a military manner. Its motto is: “Unity, Loyalty, Honor”. Its predecessor organization was the Ministry of the Interior Troops.

The Emergency Police is used to secure mass events, demonstrations, football matches, concerts and to reinforce police units. All police forces around the world have specially trained emergency police units. The task of the Emergency Police is to protect public order and maintain public safety, protect those present at mass events, disperse demonstrations that have turned violent if necessary, and remove persons committing unlawful acts from the crowd.

Members of emergency police units are usually equipped with special body protection clothing, such as a protective helmet, plastic shield, body protection suit, tonfa and sword blade. The members of the Emergency Police can be recognized by their deployment (practice) uniforms and the color of their vehicles:

They do not wear a flat cap. Their deployment pilot cap is burgundy they wear a burgundy armband on their left upper arm, on the back of their outerwear, the inscription "KÉSZENLÉTI RENDORSÉG" can be read above the inscription "POLICE" and their vehicles are painted silver metallic instead of white. The Budapest barracks of the Emergency Police have approximately four to five hundred police officers who can be immediately deployed as riot police, which is why the organization is particularly effective as an emergency police force in the capital. There are also barracks in larger cities (Miskolc, Nyírbátor, Debrecen, Orosháza, Szeged, Kiskunhalas, Pécs, Kaposvár, Szombathely and Győr).

The unit's commander is Major General Dr. Csaba Tarcsa.

As of 1 September 2012, the National Investigation Bureau continues to operate as a directorate of the Emergency Police, and the commander of the Emergency Police has become the national deputy chief of police.
