= List of law enforcement agencies =

A law enforcement agency (LEA) is any agency which enforces the law. This may be a local police, county sheriff, state trooper, and FBI in the United States. Also, it can be used to describe an international organization such as Interpol and UNPOL, and the military police and gendarmerie by other countries.

International – Africa – Asia – Europe – North America – Oceania – South America – Disbanded

== International ==
- Ameripol, (Police Community of the Americas)
- ASEANAPOL, (Inter-ASEAN Police)
- EUROGENDFOR (European Gendarmerie Force)
- European Union Police Mission in Bosnia and Herzegovina
- European Union Rule of Law Mission in Kosovo
- Europol (European Union Agency for Law Enforcement Cooperation)
- Interpol (International Criminal Police Organization)
- Law Enforcement Intelligence Unit
- United Nations Interim Administration Mission in Kosovo
- GCCPOL, (Gulf Cooperation Council Police)
- SELEC (Southeast European Law enforcement Center), for the region of Balkan Countries, Police and customs regional international cooperation and joint activities.
- United Nations Police (UNPOL)

== Africa ==
=== Algeria ===
- Gendarmerie Nationale
- Algerian police

=== Angola ===
- The National Police Force ( Angola )

=== Benin ===
- Gendarmerie Nationale
- Republican Police of Benin

=== Botswana ===
- Botswana Police Service

=== Burkina Faso ===
- Gendarmerie Nationale

=== Burundi ===
- Nationale Police of Burundi

=== Cameroon ===
- Cameroonian Police

=== Cape Verde ===
- Polícia Judiciária
- Polícia Nacional

=== Central African Republic ===
- Sûreté Nationale
- Central African Gendarmerie

=== Chad ===
- National Police of Chad
- Gendarmerie Nationale

=== Democratic Republic of the Congo ===
- Police nationale congolaise
- Détection Militaire des Activités Anti-Patrie
- Agence nationale de renseignements

=== Republic of the Congo ===
- Congolese national gendarmerie
- Congolese national police

=== Djibouti ===
- Gendarmerie Nationale

=== Egypt ===
- Egyptian National Police

=== Eritrea ===
- Eritrea Police Force

=== Ethiopia ===
- Ethiopian Federal Police

=== Gabon ===
- Gendarmerie Nationale
- National Police Force of Gabon

=== Gambia ===
- Gambia Police Force

=== Ghana ===
- Ghana Police Service

=== Guinea-Bissau ===
- Judicial Police
- National Republic Guards (Gendarmerie or Police)

=== Kenya ===
- National Police Service
  - Kenya Police Service
  - Administration Police Service
  - Directorate of Criminal Investigations
  - Kenya Police Reserve

=== Lesotho ===
- Lesotho Mounted Police Service

=== Liberia ===
- Liberia National Police

=== Libya ===
- Libyan National Police

=== Madagascar ===
- Gendarmerie Nationale
- Presidential Security Regiment
- Police Publique

=== Malawi ===
- Malawi Police Service

=== Mali ===
- Gendarmerie Nationale

=== Mauritania ===
- Gendarmerie Nationale
- Police Nationale

=== Mauritius ===
- Mauritius Police Force

=== Morocco ===
- Gendarmerie Royale du Maroc (paramilitary national police force)
- Sûreté Nationale du Maroc (civilian national police force)
- Moroccan Auxiliary Forces

=== Mozambique ===
- Mozambique Republic Police

=== Namibia ===
Nationwide

- Namibian Police Force
  - Special Reserve Force
  - Special Field Force

Municipalities

- City Police (in some municipalities)

=== Niger ===
- National Police
- Gendarmerie Nationale

=== Nigeria ===
- Nigeria Police Force
- Nigeria Security and Civil Defence Corps
- Economic and Financial Crimes Commission
- National Drug Law Enforcement Agency
- National agencies for food and drugs administration and control

=== Rwanda ===
- Rwanda National Police

=== Senegal ===
- Police Force
- Senegalese Gendarmerie
  - Red Guard

=== Seychelles ===
- Seychelles Police Force

=== Sierra Leone ===
- Sierra Leone Police

=== Somalia ===
- Somali Police Force

=== South Africa ===
- South African Police Service (SAPS)
- Provincial Traffic Police
- Municipal Police
- Special Investigation Unit (SIU)

=== South Sudan ===
- South Sudan Police Service

=== Sudan ===
- Sudanese Police Service

=== Eswatini ===
- Royal Eswatini Police Service

=== Tanzania ===
- Tanzania Police Force
- Prevention and Combating of Corruption Bureau
- local police (mgambo and sungusungu)
- special jurisdiction police
- Tanzania Intelligence and Security Service

=== Togo ===
- Gendarmerie Nationale

=== Tunisia ===
- Ministry of Interior
  - Direction Générale de la Sûreté Nationale (Police)
  - Direction Générale de la Garde Nationale (National Guard)
  - Office National de la Protection Civile (Firefighter)
- Ministry of Finance
  - Direction Générale des Douanes (Customs)
- Ministry of Justice
  - Direction Générale des Prisons et de la Rééducation (Prisons Guards)
- Presidency
  - Direction Générale de la Sécurité du Chef de l'Etat et des Personnalités Officielles (Presidential Guards)

=== Uganda ===
- Uganda Police Force
- Internal Security Organisation

=== Zambia ===
- Zambia Police Service
- Zambia Correctional Service

=== Zimbabwe ===
- Zimbabwe Republic Police

== Asia ==
=== Afghanistan ===
- Afghan National Police

=== Bahrain ===
- Royal Bahrain Police
- National Security Agency (Bahrain)
- Special Security Force Command
- Public Security Forces

=== Bangladesh ===
- Bangladesh Police
- Range Police
- Metropolitan Police Commissionerates
- Traffic Police
- Airport Armed Police (AAP)
- Diplomatic Security Division
- Tourist Police
- Highway Police
- Industrial Police (IP)
- River Police
- Railway Police (RP)
- Police Air Wing
- Mountain Police Battalion
- Immigration Police
- Gram Police
- Mass Rapid Transit (MRT) Police Force
- Special Security and Protection Battalion (SPBn)
- Special Armed Force (SAF)
- Range Reserve Force (RRF)
- Rapid Action Battalion (RAB)
- Rapid Action Battalion Intillegence Wing
- Rapid Action Battalion Special Force
- Armed Police Battalion (APBn)
- SWAT (Bangladesh)
- Special Women Police Contingent
- Crisis Response Team (CRT)
- Anti-Terrorism Unit (ATU)
- Bomb Disposal Unit (BDU)
- Canine Unit (CU)
- Special Branch (SB)
- Detective Branch (DB)
- Intelligence & Analysis Division
- Counter Terrorism and Transnational Crime (CTTC)
- Counter Terrorism and Transnational Intelligence (CTTI)
- Police Internal Oversight (PIO)
- Cyber Security Directorate
- Prosecution Division
- Protection Division
- Telecommunication and Information Management (T&IM)
- Criminal Investigation Department (CID)
- Police Bureau of Investigation (PBI)
- Serious Crime Investigation
- Women Support & Investigation Division
- Professional Standard & Internal Investigation Division
- Women Support & Investigation Division
- Victim Support Center
- Border Guard Bangladesh
- Border Guard Police
- Border Security Bureau
- Bangladesh Coast Guard
- Bangladesh Ansar
- Battalion Ansar
- Ansar Guard Battalion
- Ansar Strike Force
- Village Defence Party
- Town Defence Party
- Regimental police
- Bangladesh Customs
- Department of Narcotics Control
- Department of Immigration & Passport
- Avsec
- Department of Prison
- Department of Forest
- VAT Audit, Intelligence and Investigation Directorate
- Financial Intelligence Unit
- Customs Intelligence and Investigation Directorate
- Central Intelligence Cell
- Railway Nirapotta Bahini
- National Security Intelligence
- Directorate General of Forces Intelligence
- National Telecommunication Monitoring Centre
- Cyber Security Agency (Bangladesh)
- Bangladesh Prisons
- Prison Intelligence Unit
- Anti-Corruption Commission (Bangladesh)

=== Bhutan ===
- Royal Bhutan Police

=== Brunei ===
- Royal Brunei Police Force

=== Cambodia ===
- Cambodian National Police

=== People's Republic of China ===
==== Mainland China ====
- Ministry of Public Security
  - People’s Police
  - State Immigration Administration
- Ministry of State Security
- People's Armed Police
  - China Coast Guard
  - Special Police Unit
  - Beijing SWAT
- China Maritime Safety Administration
- General Administration of Customs
- Urban Management (Chengguan)

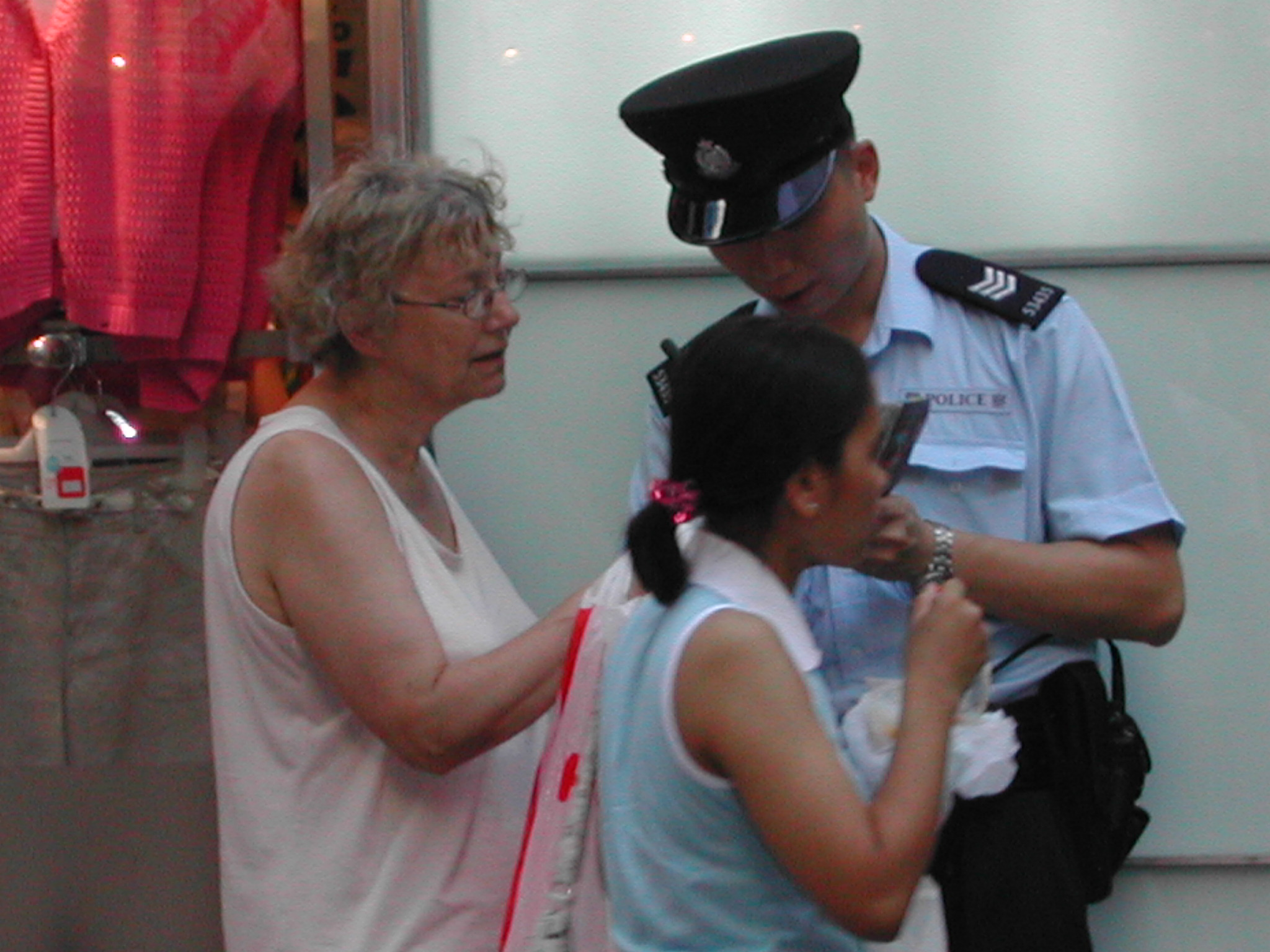
A woman asking a Hong Kong policeman for directions.

==== Hong Kong ====
- Hong Kong Police Force
- Independent Commission Against Corruption
- Hong Kong Correctional Services Department
- Immigration Department
- Customs and Excise Department

==== Macau ====
- Macau Security Force

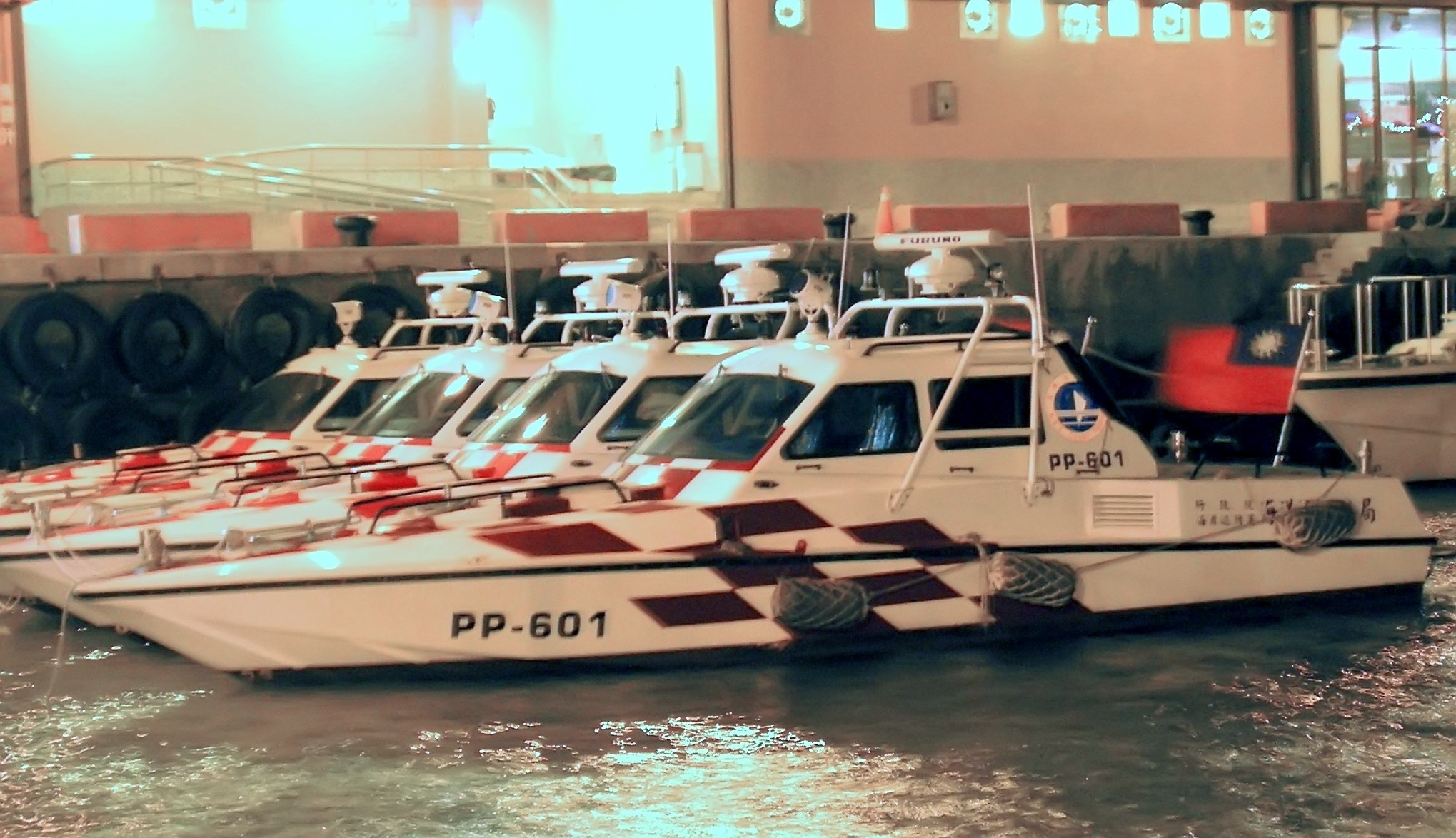
ROC Coast Guard patrol boats

=== Republic of China (Taiwan) ===
- National Police Agency
- National Immigration Agency
- Bureau of Investigation
- Coast Guard Administration
- Military Police Command

=== India ===
- Indian Police Service (IPS) - is a civil service under the All India Service. The IPS officers provide senior level leadership to law enforcement agencies both federal and state levels.

==== Central (federal) law enforcement agencies ====
- Central Bureau of Investigation
- National Investigation Agency
- Narcotics Control Bureau

==== Central armed police/security agencies ====
- Central Armed Police Forces
  - Assam Rifles
  - Border Security Force
  - Central Reserve Police Force
  - Central Industrial Security Force
  - Indo-Tibetan Border Police
  - Sashastra Seema Bal
  - National Security Guard
- Railway Protection Force

==== Maritime law enforcement agencies ====
- Indian Coast Guard

==== Central financial and economic enforcement agencies ====
- Enforcement Directorate (ED)
- Directorate of Revenue Intelligence
- Indian Customs (CBIC)
- Serious Fraud Investigation Office
- Central Board of Direct Taxes

==== State law enforcement agencies ====
- Andhra Pradesh Police
- Arunachal Pradesh Police
- Bihar Police
- Chhattisgarh Police
- Delhi Police
- Goa Police
- Gujarat Police
- Haryana Police
- Himachal Pradesh Police
- Jammu and Kashmir Police
- Jharkhand Police
- Karnataka Police
- Kerala Police
  - Thiruvananthapuram City Police
  - Kochi City Police
- Madhya Pradesh Police
- Maharashtra Police
  - Mumbai Police
- Manipur Police
- Meghalaya Police
- Mizoram Police
- Nagaland Police
- Odisha Police
- Punjab Police
- Rajasthan Police
- Sikkim Police
- Tamil Nadu Police
  - Chennai Police
- Telangana Police
- Tripura Police
- Uttarakhand Police
- Uttar Pradesh Police
- West Bengal Police
  - Kolkata Police
- State Armed Police Forces

==== State special jurisdiction law enforcement agencies ====
- Kerala Excise
- Kerala Forest and Wildlife Department
- Kerala Motor Vehicles Department
- Andhra Pradesh Prohibition and Excise Department
- Department of Excise & Taxation, Haryana
- Telangana Excise
- Tamil Nadu Forest Department
- Maharashtra Forest Department
- Forests Department, Haryana
- Department of Forest and Wildlife (Punjab)
- Telangana Forest Department
- Uttarakhand Forest Department
- Environment and Forests Department (Assam)
- Environment and Forests Department (Arunachal Pradesh)
- Department of Transport (Tamil Nadu)
- Vigilance and Anti-Corruption Bureau (Kerala)
- Anti-Corruption Bureau (Maharashtra) (ACB)
- Anti-Corruption Bureau (Andhra Pradesh)

=== Indonesia ===
- Indonesian National Police
  - Detachment 88
  - Mobile Brigade Corps
- Municipal Police (Indonesia)
- Indonesia Forest Rangers
- Military Police Corps (Indonesia)
- National Anti-Narcotics Agency (Indonesia)
- National Agency for Combating Terrorism
- Directorate General of Customs and Excise

=== Iran ===
- Islamic Revolutionary Guard Corps
- Iran Police Force
- Ministry of Intelligence

=== Iraq ===
- Iraqi National Police Force (paramilitary)
- Iraqi Police Service (civilian)

=== Israel ===
- Israel Police
  - Israel Border Police
- Military Police Corps

=== Japan ===
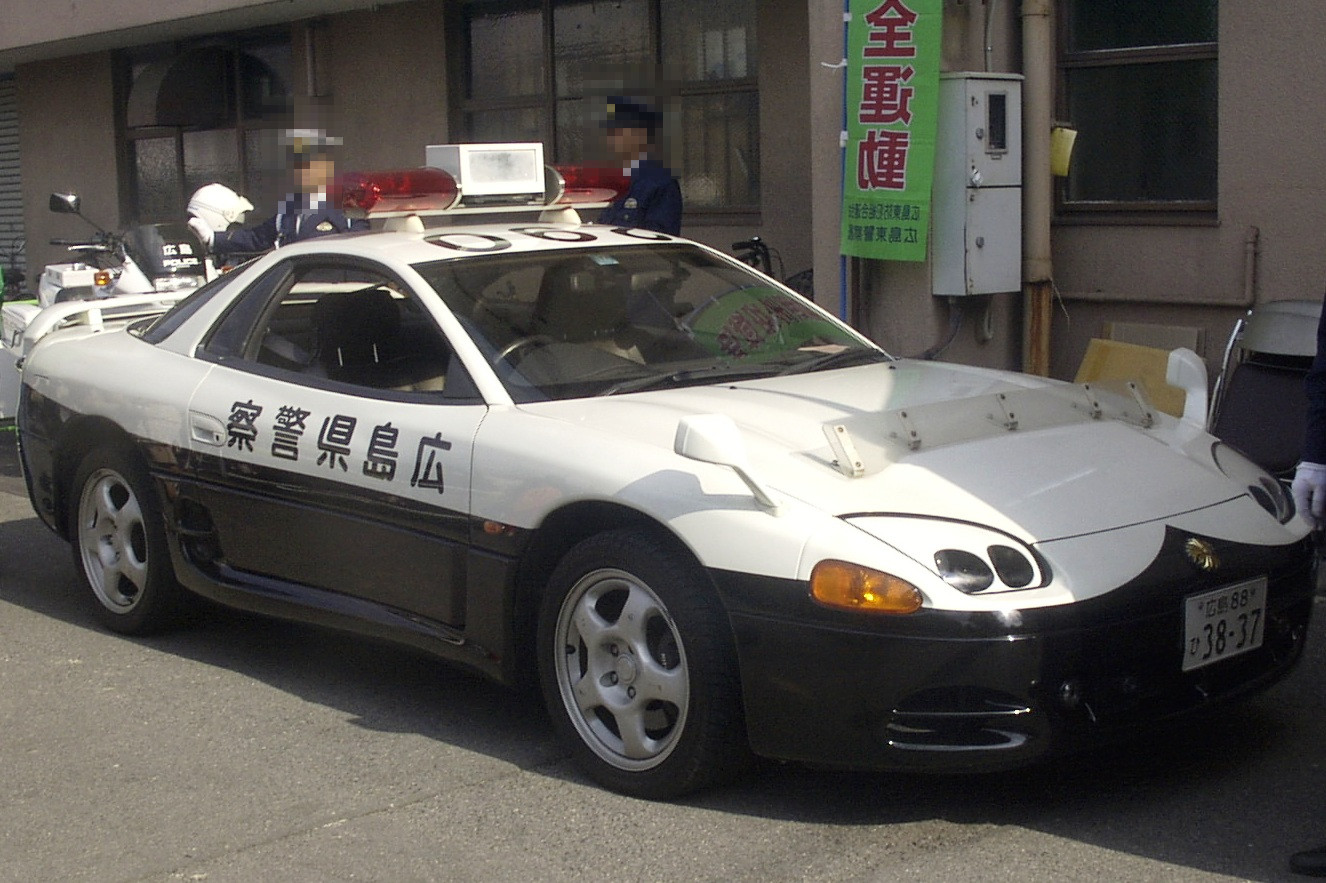
Japanese Mitsubishi GTO patrol car

- National Public Safety Commission
  - National Police Agency
    - Imperial Guard of Japan
    - Tokyo Metropolitan Police Department
    - 46 prefecture police departments
- Japan Coast Guard (known as the Japanese Maritime Safety Agency from 1949 to 2000)
- Ministry of Finance
  - Japan Customs
- Ministry of Justice
  - Correctional Bureau
  - Immigration Services Agency

=== Jordan ===
- Law enforcement in Jordan
- Public Security Directorate (PSD)
- General Directorate of Gendarmerie

=== Kazakhstan ===
- (National Police • Kazak Militsiya • Полиция Казахстана)

=== Democratic People's Republic of Korea (North Korea) ===
- Police of North Korea
- Social Security Forces

=== Republic of Korea (South Korea) ===
- Republic of Korea National Public Safety Commission
  - Republic of Korea National Police Agency
    - Seoul Metropolitan Police Agency
- Korea Correctional Service
- Korea Customs Service
- Korea Coast Guard (formerly known as the Republic of Korea Maritime Police)
- Korea Immigration Service
- Corruption Investigation Office for High-ranking Officials
- Jeju Municipal Police
- Korea Railway Police

=== Kuwait ===
- Kuwait Police

=== Kyrgyzstan ===
- Law enforcement in Kyrgyzstan
- Ministry of the Interior Kyrgyzstan National Police

=== Laos ===
- Ministry of Security

=== Lebanon ===
- Internal Security Forces

=== Malaysia ===
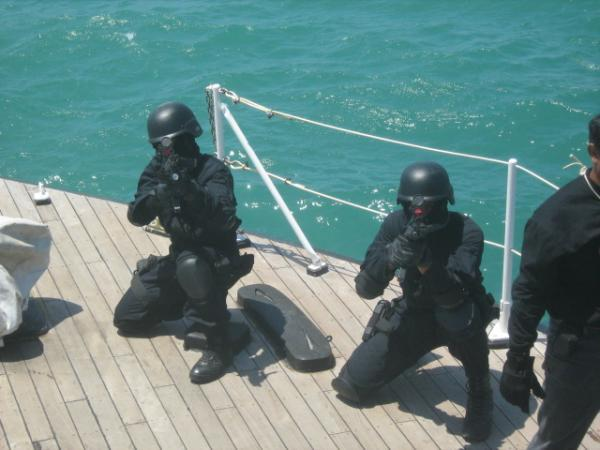
Police Counter-terrorist Force Pasukan Gerakan Khas during stormed the patrol vessel drill.

Malaysian Ministry of Home Affairs

- Royal Malaysia Police (Malay: Polis Diraja Malaysia – PDRM)
- National Anti-Drug Agency (Malay: Agensi Anti-Dadah Kebangsaan – AADK)
- Malaysian Prison Department (Malay: Jabatan Penjara Malaysia)
- RELA Corps
- Immigration Department of Malaysia (Malay: Jabatan Imigresen Malaysia)
- Pasukan Gerakan Khas (PGK)
- Special Actions Unit (UTK)
- General Operations Force
- Senoi Praaq
- Counter Smuggling Unit
- UNGERIN
- Federal Reserve Unit
- Marine Operations Force
- Royal Malaysian Police Air Wing Unit

Malaysian Ministry of Finance

- Royal Malaysian Custom (Malay: Jabatan Kastam Diraja Malaysia)
- Customs Operational Battle Force Response Assault
- Pasukan Tindakan Khas
- Pasukan Kawalan Khas
- Trup Tindakan Cepat
- Pauskan Taktikal Khas Jabatan Imigresen
- Special Tactical Response and Investigation Key Enforcers

Prime Minister's Department (Malaysia)

- Malaysian Maritime Enforcement Agency (Malay: Agensi Penguatkuasaan Maritim Malaysia)
- Malaysian Anti-Corruption Commission (Malay: Suruhanjaya Pencegahan Rasuah Malaysia – SPRM)

Military of Malaysia

- Kor Polis Tentera DiRaja (Royal Military Police Corps)

=== Maldives ===
- Maldives Police Force
- Maldives National Defence Force
  - Maldivian Coast Guard

=== Mongolia ===
- Law enforcement in Mongolia
- Ministry of Justice and Internal Affairs (Mongolia)
  - National Police Agency (Mongolia)
  - General Authority for Border Protection
  - Internal Troops of Mongolia

=== Myanmar ===
- Myanmar Police Force

=== Nepal ===
- Nepal Police
- Armed Police Force

=== Oman ===
- Royal Oman Police

=== Pakistan ===
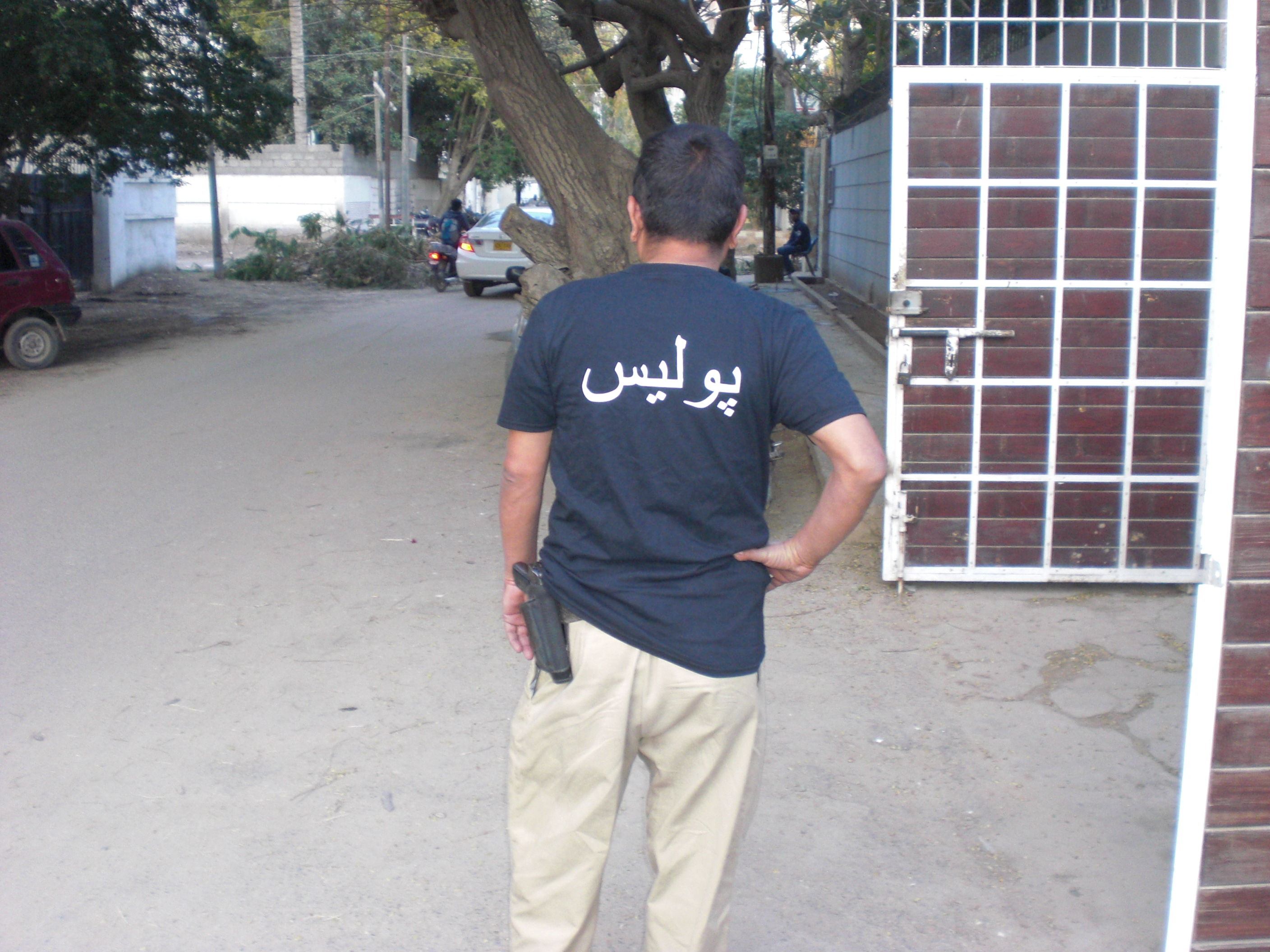
A personnel of the Sindh Police in uniform with a handgun on his belt.

==== Federal ====
- Anti-Narcotics Force
- Airports Security Force
- Federal Investigation Agency
- Frontier Constabulary
- National Accountability Bureau
- National Highways & Motorway Police
- Pakistan Customs
- Pakistan Railways Police
- Capital Territory Police
- Civil Armed Forces
- Islamabad Traffic Police

==== Provincial ====
- Azad Jammu and Kashmir Police
- Balochistan Police
- Khyber Pakhtunkhwa Police
- Gilgit-Baltistan Police
- Punjab Police
- Sindh Police

==== Joint Army & Federal ====
- Pakistan Rangers (Sindh and Punjab)
- Frontier Corps Balochistan (North)
- Frontier Corps Balochistan (South)
- Frontier Corps Khyber Pakhtunkhwa (North)
- Frontier Corps Khyber Pakhtunkhwa (South)
- Gilgit Baltistan Scouts (Gilgit-Baltistan)
- Pakistan Maritime Security Agency
- Pakistan Coast Guards
- Frontier Corps
- Sindh Rangers
- Punjab Rangers

=== Palestine ===
- Palestinian Civil Police Force
- Palestinian Preventive Security
- Palestinian Security Services
- Palestinian National Security Forces

=== Philippines ===
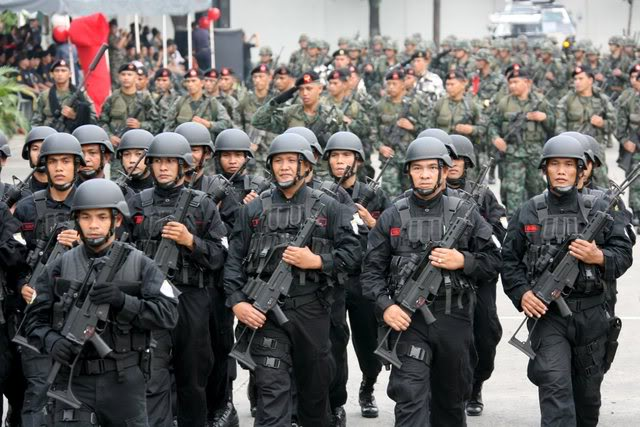
PSG SRU operators march during a parade in counter-terrorist combat gear. Note that they're marching with a mix of G36 and G36C assault rifles.

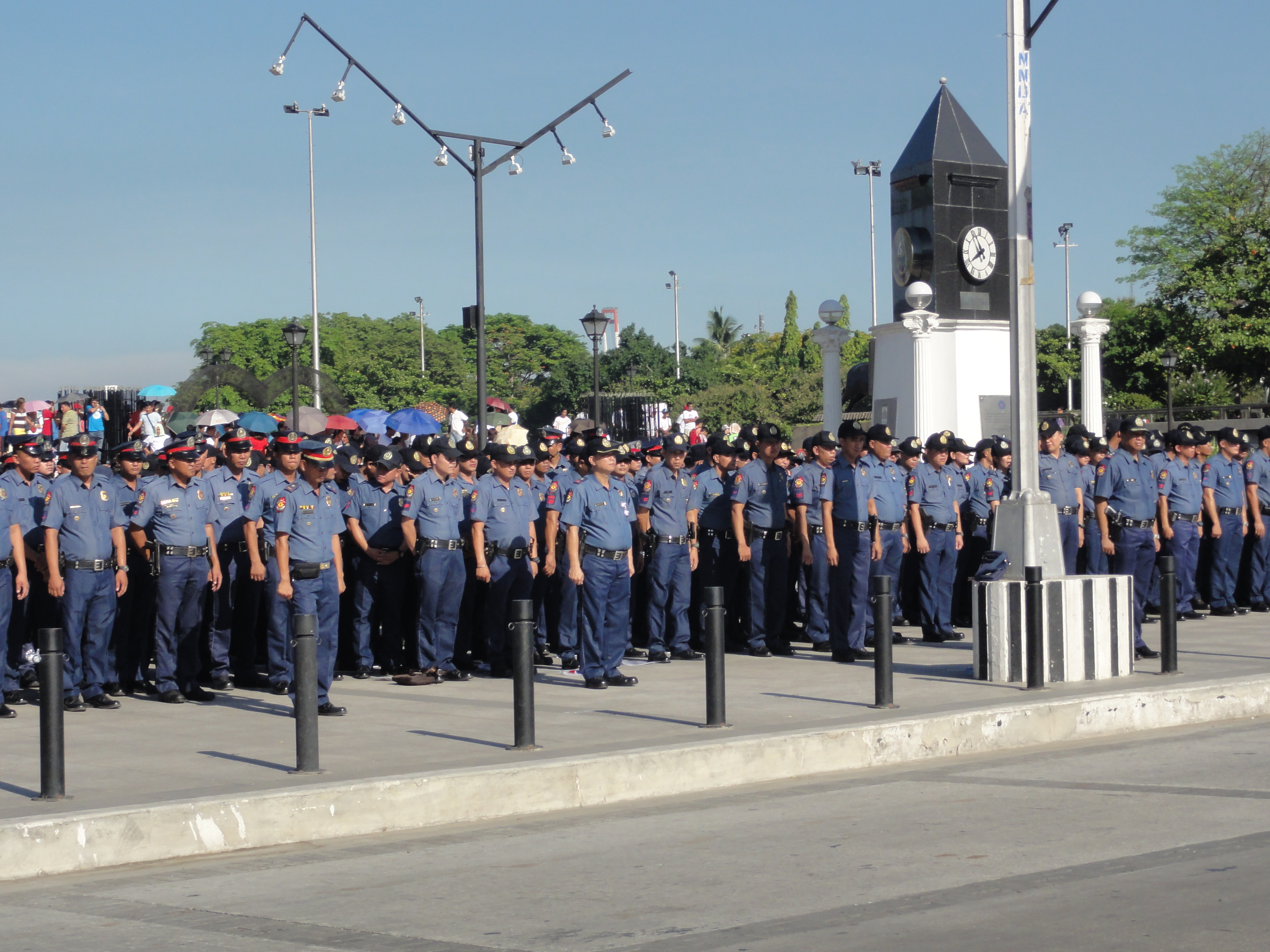
Philippine National Police Members on Rizal Park, Manila

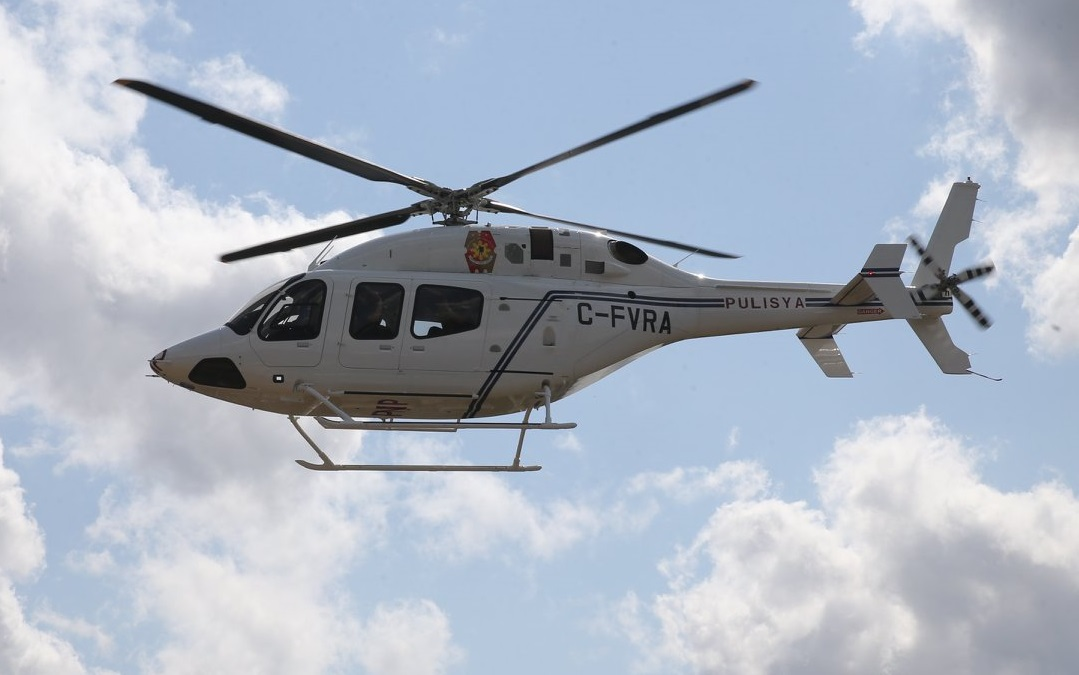
Bell 429 Helicopter of the Philippine National Police

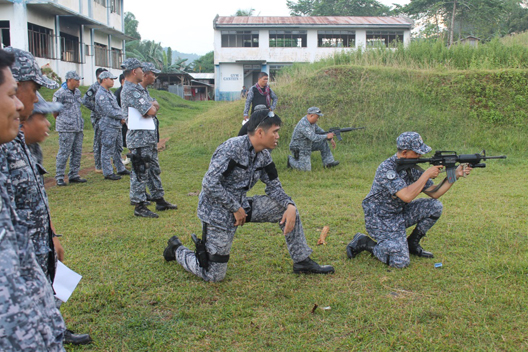
Bureau of Jail Management and Penology members in a Firearms Safety and Proficiency Training

- Office of the President
  - Presidential Security Group (PSG)
    - Special Reaction Unit (SRU)
  - Dangerous Drugs Board (DDB)
    - Philippine Drug Enforcement Agency (PDEA)
  - Optical Media Board (OMB) Enforcement and Investigation Division (EID)
  - Metropolitan Manila Development Authority – Traffic Enforcement Division (MMDA-TED)
  - Movie and Television Review and Classification Board (MTRCB)
  - Bases Conversion Development Authority
    - Clark Development Corporation - Public Safety Division (CDC-PSD)
    - Subic Bay Metropolitan Authority - Law Enforcement Department (SBMA-LED)
- Department of the Interior and Local Government
  - National Police Commission (NAPOLCOM)
    - Philippine National Police (PNP)
  - Bureau of Jail Management and Penology (BJMP)
  - Bureau of Fire Protection (BFP)
  - Local Government Unit
    - Public Order and Safety Office (POSO)
    - Traffic Management Office (TMO)
    - Barangay Public Safety Office (BPSO)
- Department of Justice
  - National Bureau of Investigation (NBI)
  - Bureau of Immigration—Law Enforcement Division (BI-LED)
  - Bureau of Corrections (BuCor)
- Department of Transportation
  - Philippine Ports Authority – Port Police Department (PPA-PPD)
  - Land Transportation Office – Law Enforcement Service (LTO-LES)
  - Land Transportation Franchising and Regulatory Board (LTFRB)
  - Office for Transportation Security (OTS)
    - Manila International Airport Authority - Airport Police Department (MIAA-APD)
  - Philippine Coast Guard (PCG)
  - Maritime Industry Authority (MARINA)
  - Civil Aviation Authority of the Philippines (CAAP)
- Department of Finance
  - Bureau of Internal Revenue (BIR)
    - Collection Enforcement Division (CED)
    - Enforcement Service (ES)
    - Large Taxpayers Collection and Enforcement Division (LTCED)
  - Bureau of Customs—Enforcement Group (BOC-EG)
  - Bangko Sentral ng Pilipinas - Security Force (BSP-SF)
- Department of Health
  - Food and Drug Administration (FDA)
    - Office of Regulatory Enforcement Unit (OREU)
- Department of Trade and Industry
  - Consumer Welfare and Trade Regulation Group (DTI-CWTRG)
- Department of Environment and National Resources
  - Law Enforcement and Licenses Division (DENR-LELD)
- Department of National Defense
  - Armed Forces of the Philippines (AFP)
    - Military Police (MP)
- Department of Agriculture
  - Bureau of Fisheries and Aquatic Resources (BFAR)
    - Bantay Dagat (Sea Patrol)

=== Qatar ===
- Law enforcement in Qatar
- Rescue Police Department (Ai-Fazza)
- Juvenile Police Department
- Airport Security Department
- Qatar State Security

=== Saudi Arabia ===
- Royal Saudi Arabian Police Force
- Saudi Arabian Traffic Police Force
- Saudi Arabian Border Guard
- Saudi Arabian Coast Guard
- Saudi Arabian Customs and Immigration Department
- Mabahith (Secret Service)
- Hay'ah (Religious Police)

=== Singapore ===
- Singapore Police Force
  - Special Operations Command
    - Crisis Negotiation Unit
  - Police K-9 Unit
    - Police National Service Full-time Light Strike Force
    - Police Tactical Unit (PTUs)
    - Special Tactics and Rescue
  - Police Coast Guard
  - Volunteer Special Constabulary
- Auxiliary Police Forces
  - Aetos Security Management
  - Certis CISCO Security Private Limited
  - SATS Security Services
- Corrupt Practices Investigation Bureau
- Immigration and Checkpoints Authority
- Central Narcotics Bureau
- Internal Security Department
- Singapore Armed Forces Military Police Command

=== Sri Lanka ===
- Sri Lanka Police
  - Special Task Force
  - Criminal Investigation Department
- Sri Lanka Corps of Military Police
- Naval Provost Branch
- Air Force Police
- Commission to Investigate Allegation of Bribery or Corruption (Bribery Commission)
- Sri Lanka Civil Security Force

=== Syria ===
- Law enforcement in Syria
- Internal Security Command (Syria)
- General Intelligence Service (Syria)

=== Tajikistan ===
- Law enforcement in Tajikistan
- Drug Control Agency
- Tajik Internal Troops
- Ministry of Internal Affairs (Tajikistan)

=== Thailand ===
- Royal Thai Police
- Department of Special Investigation
- Special Branch Bureau is the Special Branch of the Royal Thai Police
- Narcotics Control Board

=== East Timor ===
- East Timor National Police

=== Turkmenistan ===
- Law enforcement in Turkmenistan
- Ministry of Internal Affairs (Turkmenistan)
- Ministry for National Security (Turkmenistan)

=== United Arab Emirates ===
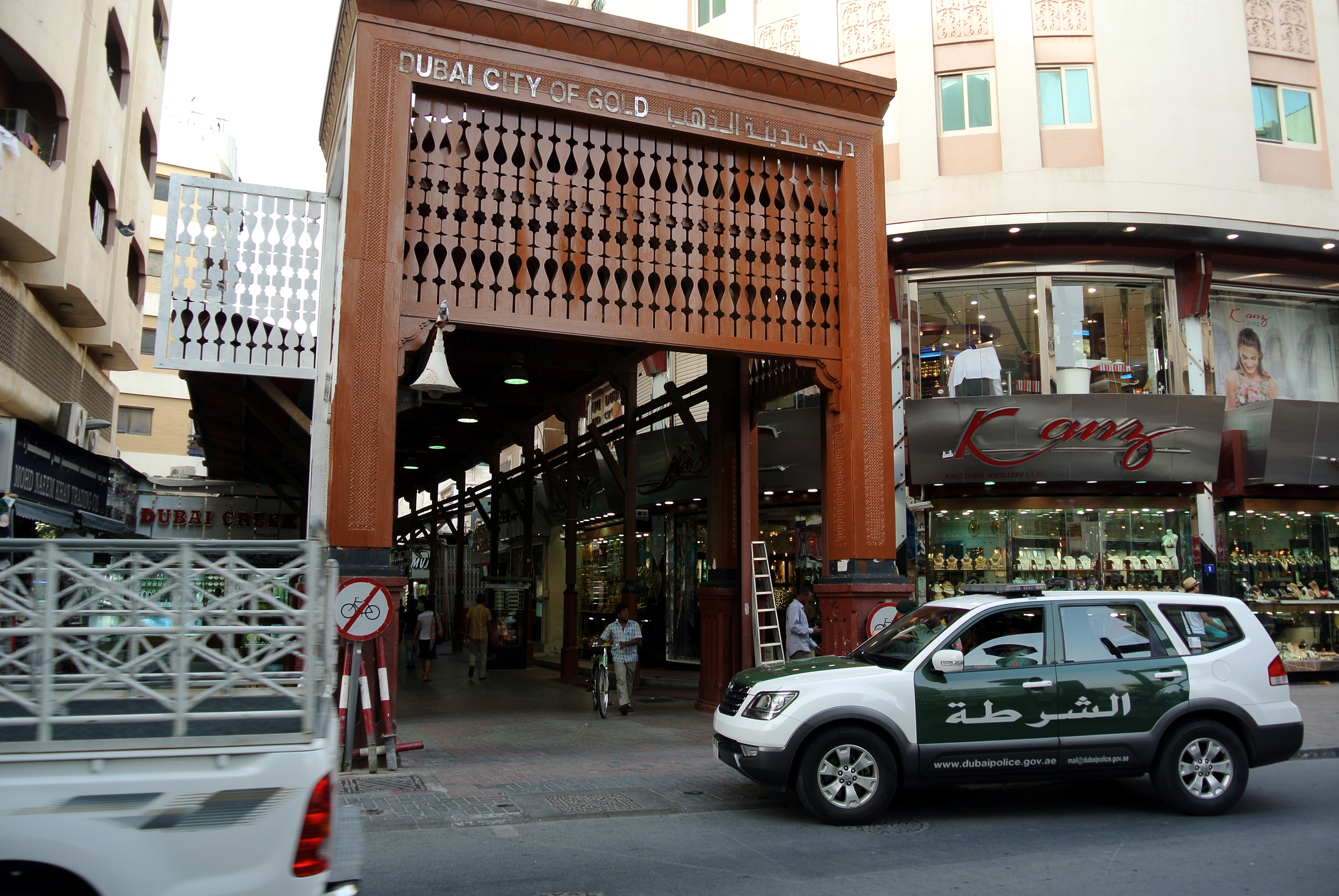
Dubai Police vehicle at the entrance of Dubai Gold Souk

Emirati level

- Abu Dhabi Police
- Dubai Police Force
- Sharjah Police Force
- Special Police Unit (SWAT)

=== Uzbekistan ===
- Law enforcement in Uzbekistan

Ministry of Internal Affairs (Uzbekistan)

- National Security Service (Uzbekistan)
  - Uzbekistan Frontier Service
  - Uzbekistan Customs Service

=== Vietnam ===
National

- Vietnam People's Public Security (Công an Nhân dân Việt Nam) under the Ministry of Public Security (Bộ Công an Việt Nam), divides into:
  - Vietnam People's Police (Cảnh sát Nhân dân Việt Nam) consists of:
    - Traffic Police (Cảnh sát Giao thông), for traffic control and enforcement
    - Judiciary Police (Cảnh sát Bảo vệ và Hỗ trợ Tư pháp), for judiciary and executive enforcement
    - Rapid Response Police - also known as 113 Police (Cảnh sát Phản ứng Nhanh/Cảnh sát 113), for rapid criminal countering
    - Criminal Investigation Police (Cảnh sát Hình sự), for criminal investigation
    - Drug Investigation Police (Cảnh sát Điều tra Ma túy), for drug countering and investigation
    - Corruption Investigation Police (Cảnh sát Điều tra Tham nhũng), for corruption investigation
    - High Tech Investigation Police (Cảnh sát Điều tra Công nghệ cao), for high tech criminal investigation
    - Administrative Police (Cảnh sát Quản lý Hành chính), for administrative and resident services
    - Environmental Police (Cảnh sát Môi trường), for environmental law enforcement
    - Fire and Rescue Police (Cảnh sát Phòng cháy Chữa cháy và Cứu nạn Cứu hộ), for firefighting, search and rescue missions
    - Prison Guard (Cảnh sát Trại giam), for prison management and control
    - Mobile Police command ( Bộ tư lệnh Cảnh sát Cơ động), for riot and terrorist countering
    - Order Police (Cảnh sát Trật tự), for public order response
    - Protective Police (Cảnh sát Bảo vệ Mục tiêu), for protective services of properties and personnel
  - Vietnam People's Security (An ninh Nhân dân Việt Nam) consists of:
    - Cyber Security (An ninh Mạng), for cyber and internet affairs
    - Immigration Security (An ninh Xuất nhập cảnh), for immigration management, airport and seaport entry
    - Intelligence Service (Tình báo), for intelligence collection and investigation
    - Ciphering Service (Cơ yếu), for protection of top secret documents
    - Border Checkpoint Security (An ninh Cửa khẩu), for border checkpoint entry
    - Protective Guard command (Bộ tư lệnh Cảnh vệ), for protective services of the State and Communist Party leaders
    - Social Security (An ninh Xã hội), for social issues
    - Secret Service (Ngoại tuyến), for intelligence collection in secrecy
    - Political Security (An ninh Chính trị), for political protection
    - Financial and Monetary Security (An ninh Tài chính và Tiền tệ), for financial investigation
    - Economical Security (An ninh Kinh tế), for economical investigation
    - Agricultural and Rural Security (An ninh Nông nghiệp Nông thôn), for rural issues
    - Information and Communication Security (An ninh Thông tin và Truyền thông), for information, press and media investigation
  - Vietnam Customs under the Ministry of Finance
  - Vietnam Border Guard and Vietnam Coast Guard under the Ministry of Defence
  - Vietnam Forest Ranger and Vietnam Fishery Surveillance under the Ministry of Agriculture and Rural Development

Local

- Provincial/Municipal Public Security (Công an Tỉnh/Thành phố Trực thuộc Trung ương)
  - District/Town/Provincial City Public Security (Công an Quận/Huyện/Thị xã/Thành phố Trực thuộc Tỉnh)
    - Commune/Ward/Township Public Security (Công an Xã/Phường/Thị trấn)

=== Yemen ===
- Law enforcement in Yemen

== Europe ==
=== Albania ===
- Law Enforcement in Albania
  - Albanian Police
  - RENEA
  - Internal Affairs and Complaints Service
  - Coast Guard (Albania)
  - Intelligence and Security Agency
  - Republican Guard (Albania)

=== Andorra ===
- Andorran Police Service and traffic police (local police) divided by communes

=== Armenia ===
- Police of Armenia

=== Austria ===
Federal

- Bundesamt zur Korruptionsprävention und Korruptionsbekämpfung (BAK): Federal Bureau to prevent and to fight corruption

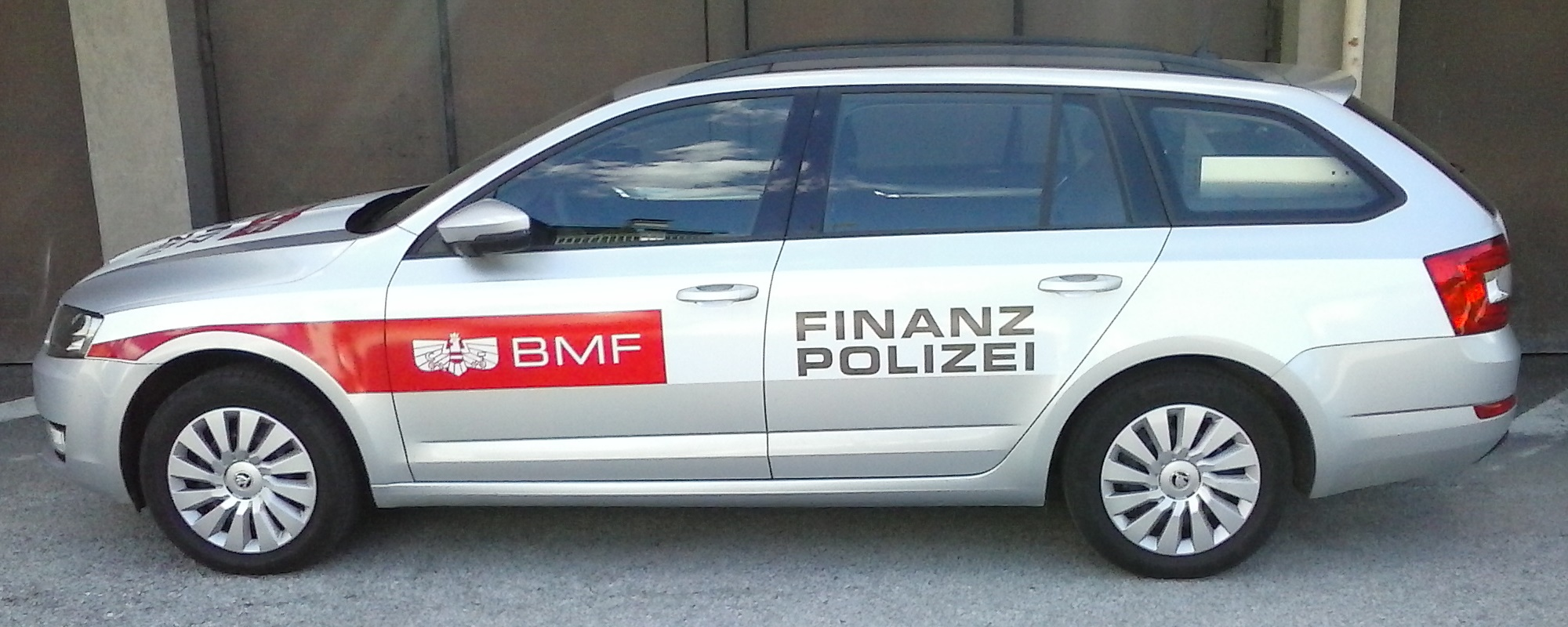
Car of the Austrian Finanzpolizei

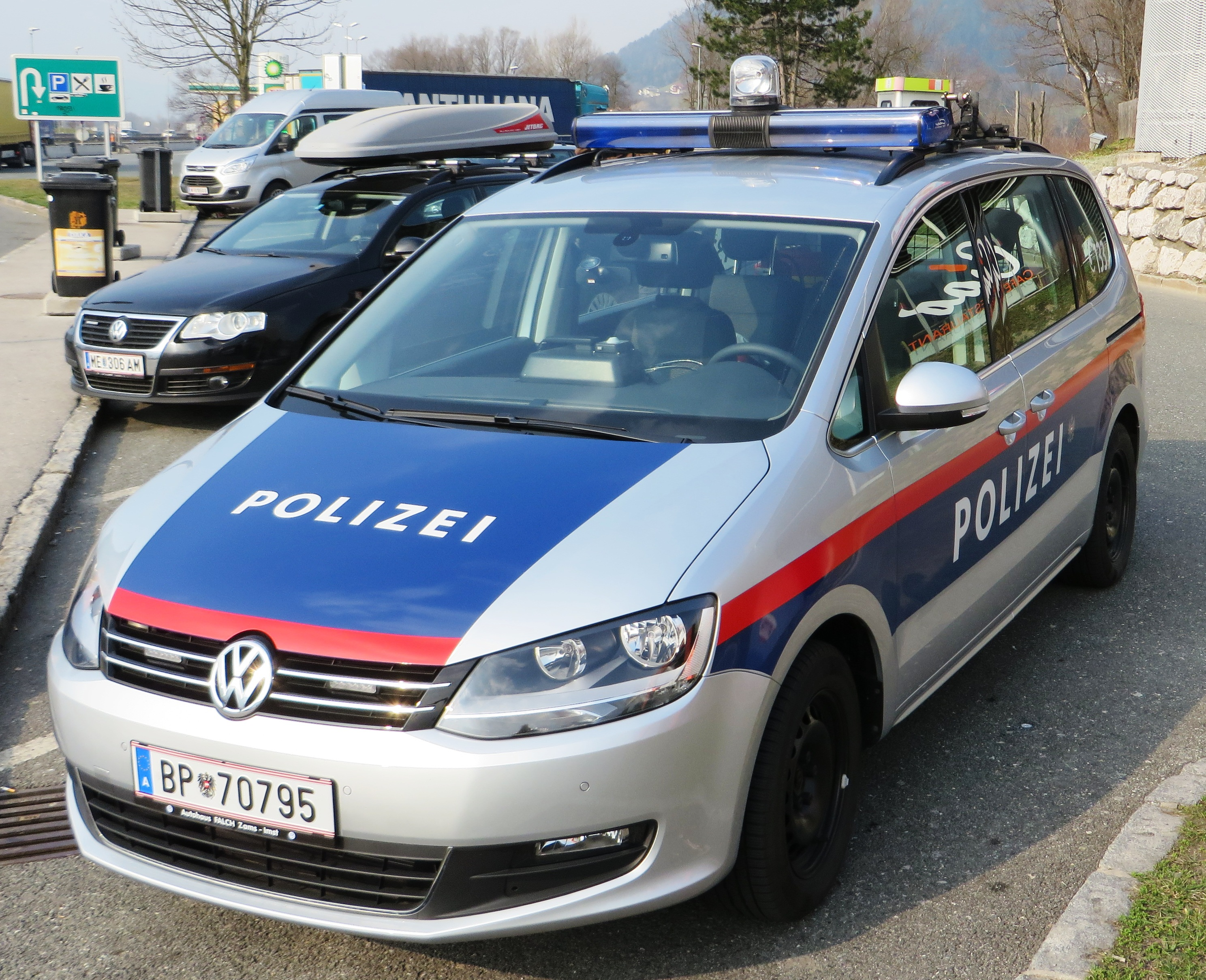
VW Touran in the Austrian Police livery

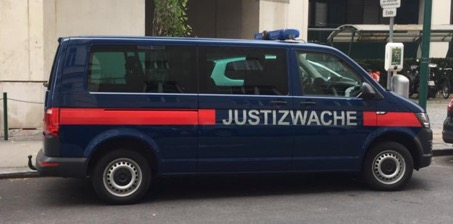
Standard vehicle of the Austrian Justizwache

- Bundeskriminalamt (BK): Federal Criminal Police Office
- Bundespolizei: Federal Police Service
  - Alpine Einsatzgruppen (AEG): Mountain Police, part of Federal Police
  - Bereitschaftseinheit Wien (BE): Standby Police Unit for Vienna
  - Einsatzeinheit (EE): Riot Police of Federal Police
  - See- und Strompolizei: River branch of Federal Police
  - Sonderdienste Sektor Graz (SEKTOR): SWAT unit of Federal Police in Graz
  - WEGA (only short version in use, originally from Wiener Einsatz-Gruppe Alarmabteilung): SWAT unit of Federal Police in Vienna
- Einsatzkommando Cobra (EKO Cobra): Federal SWAT and special forces unit, which is not part of the Federal Police, part of the Ministry of the Interior (BMI)
- Finanzpolizei: Financial Guard
- Flugpolizei: Air Police, which is not part of the Federal Police, part of the Ministry of the Interior (BMI)
- Justizwache (JW): Penitentiary Police
  - Justizwache Einsatzgruppe (JEG): SWAT Team of Penitentiary Police
- Militärpolizei: Military Police of the Austrian Armed Forces
- Operative Zollaufsicht (OZA): Customs Service
- Sondereinheit für Observation (SEO): Special Unit for Covered Technical Surveillance, which is not part of the Federal Police, part of the Ministry of the Interior (BMI)

Municipalities

- Stadtpolizei: Local or City Police
- Ordnungswache or Ordnungsamt: municipal law enforcement, in unincorporated cities, that are not allowed to have a Stadtpolizei, like Graz and Klagenfurt
- Straßenaufsicht: municipal traffic enforcement

=== Azerbaijan ===
- Azerbaijani National Police
- Internal Troops of Azerbaijan
- Rapid Police Unit
- Ministry of Internal Affairs (Azerbaijan)

=== Belarus ===
- Belarusian Militsiya (National Police)
- Belarusian Presidential Guard
- Belarusian State Security Agency
- OMON (Belarus)

=== Belgium ===
- Federal police (1 federal force for the entire country, responsible for specialized and supra-local policing as well as support to the local police)
- Local police (189 local forces for 189 police zones that encompass either one muninicipality or multiple municipalities, responsible for basic policing)

=== Bosnia and Herzegovina ===
- Bosnia and Herzegovina Federal Police

=== Bulgaria ===
- National Investigative Service, legally part of the judiciary and under the Ministry of Justice
- State Agency for National Security
- General Directorate of the Police
  - Specialized Police Forces
- General Directorate of the Border Police

=== Channel Islands ===
- Guernsey Police
- Guernsey Border Agency
- States of Jersey Police
- States of Jersey Customs and Immigration Service

=== Croatia ===
- Croatian Police

=== Cyprus ===
- Cyprus Police Force

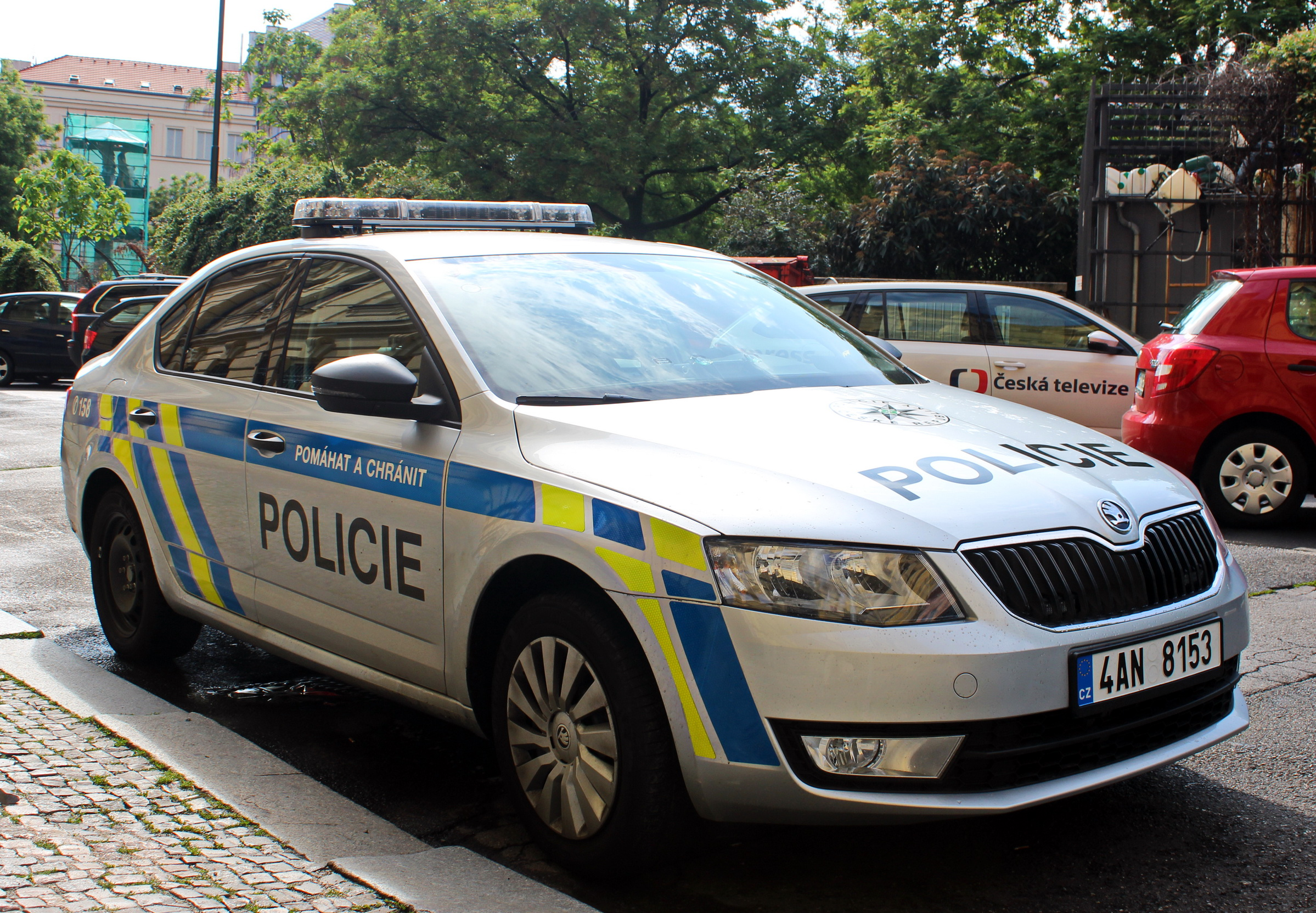
Czech police car in Prague in 2016.

=== Czech Republic ===
National

- Czech Republic National Police
- The Customs Administration of the Czech Republic
- General Inspection of Security Forces
- Prison Service of the Czech Republic (Mainly within buildings under its authority)

Municipal

- Městská policie (Municipal police)

=== Denmark ===
- Danish National Police
  - Rigspolitiet
- Danish Security and Intelligence Service

=== Estonia ===
- Police and Border Guard Board
- Estonian Internal Security Service

=== Finland ===
- Police of Finland
- Finnish Border Guard
- Finnish Customs
- Finnish Security Intelligence Service
- National Bureau of Investigation

=== France ===
==== National ====
- Administration pénitentiaire (Department of Corrections)
  - Équipe régionale d’intervention et de sécurité (SWAT teams)
- Douane (Customs)

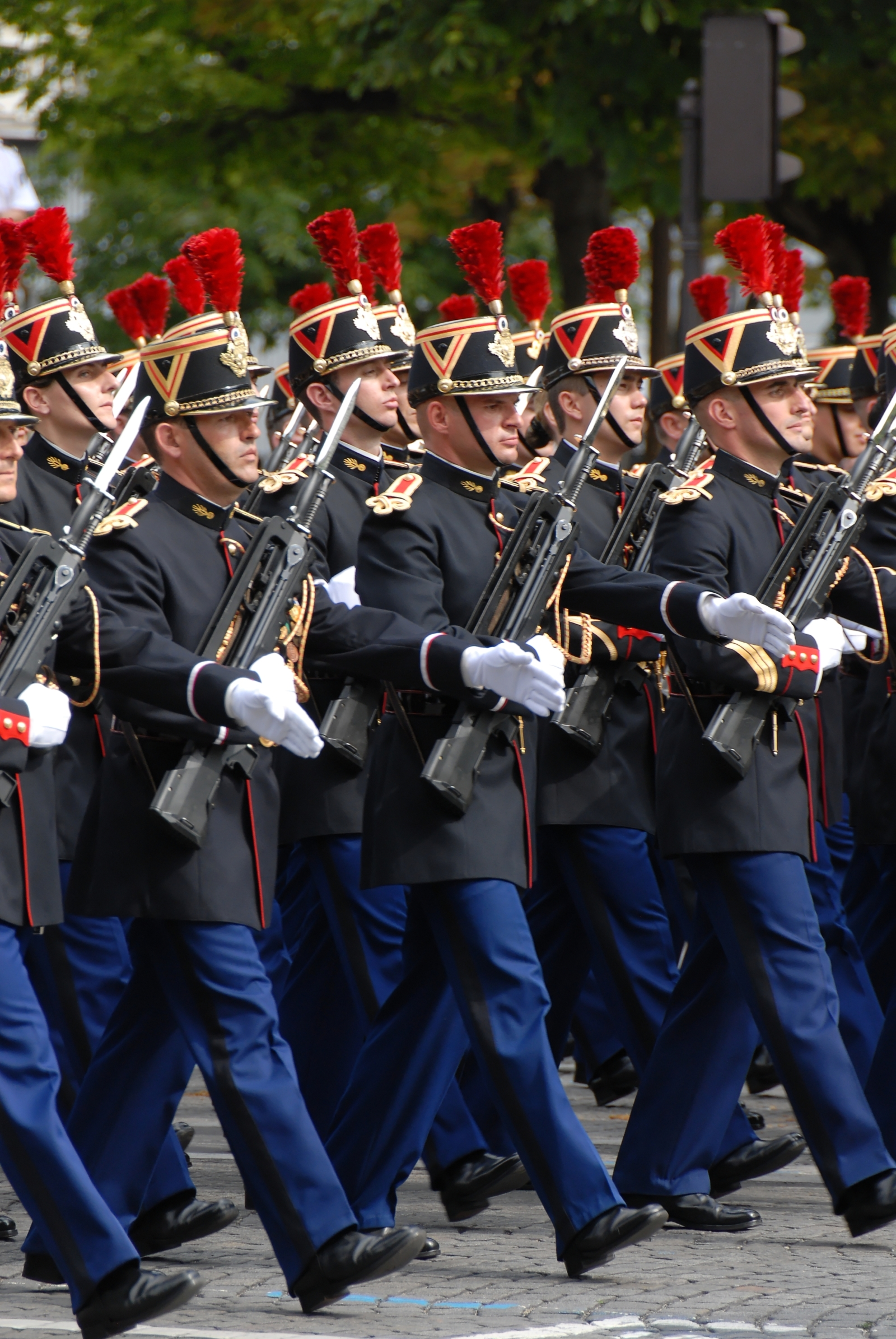
Republican Guard Infantry in ceremonial uniform.

- Gendarmerie Nationale
  - Garde républicaine (Republican Guard): Guard of honour
    - Republican Guard Cavalry Regiment
    - Republican Guard Infantry Regiment
  - Gendarmerie de l'Air (air police)
  - Gendarmerie Maritime (maritime police)
  - Gendarmerie Départementale
  - Gendarmerie Mobile
    - Groupe d'intervention de la gendarmerie nationale (GIGN)
- Police Nationale
  - Compagnies Républicaines de Sécurité (riot control force)
  - Prefecture of Police Paris Police Service

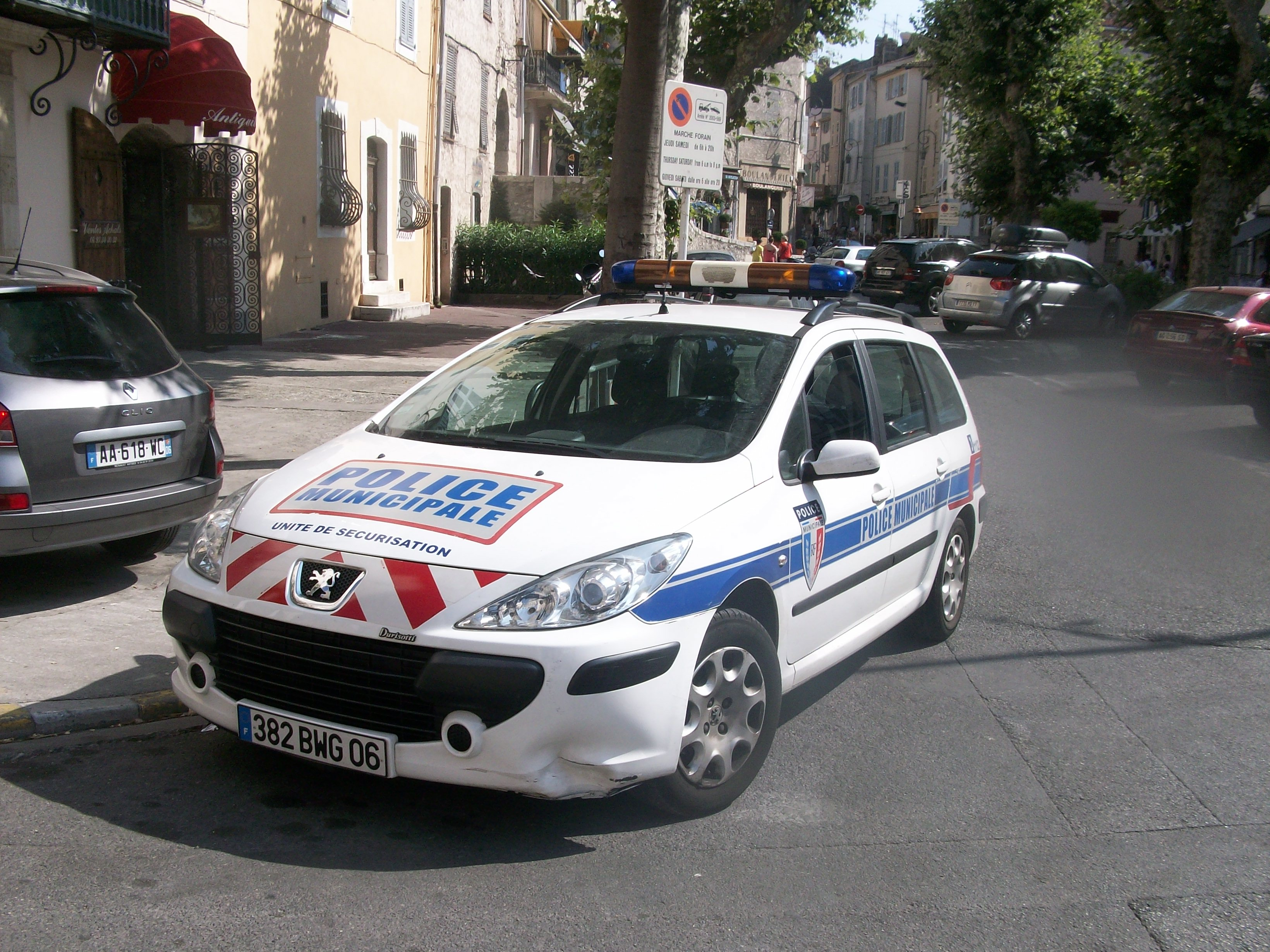
Police municipale Peugeot car in Antibes, Provence-Alpes-Côte d'Azur.

- General Directorate for Internal Security
- Municipal Police (France)

==== Municipal ====
- Garde champêtre (Park Rangers/Game Wardens)
- Police Municipale (Local Police)

==== Overseas France ====
- Royal police and territorial guard (Wallis and Futuna)

=== Georgia ===
- Law enforcement in Georgia
  - Ministry of Internal Affairs of Georgia

=== Germany ===
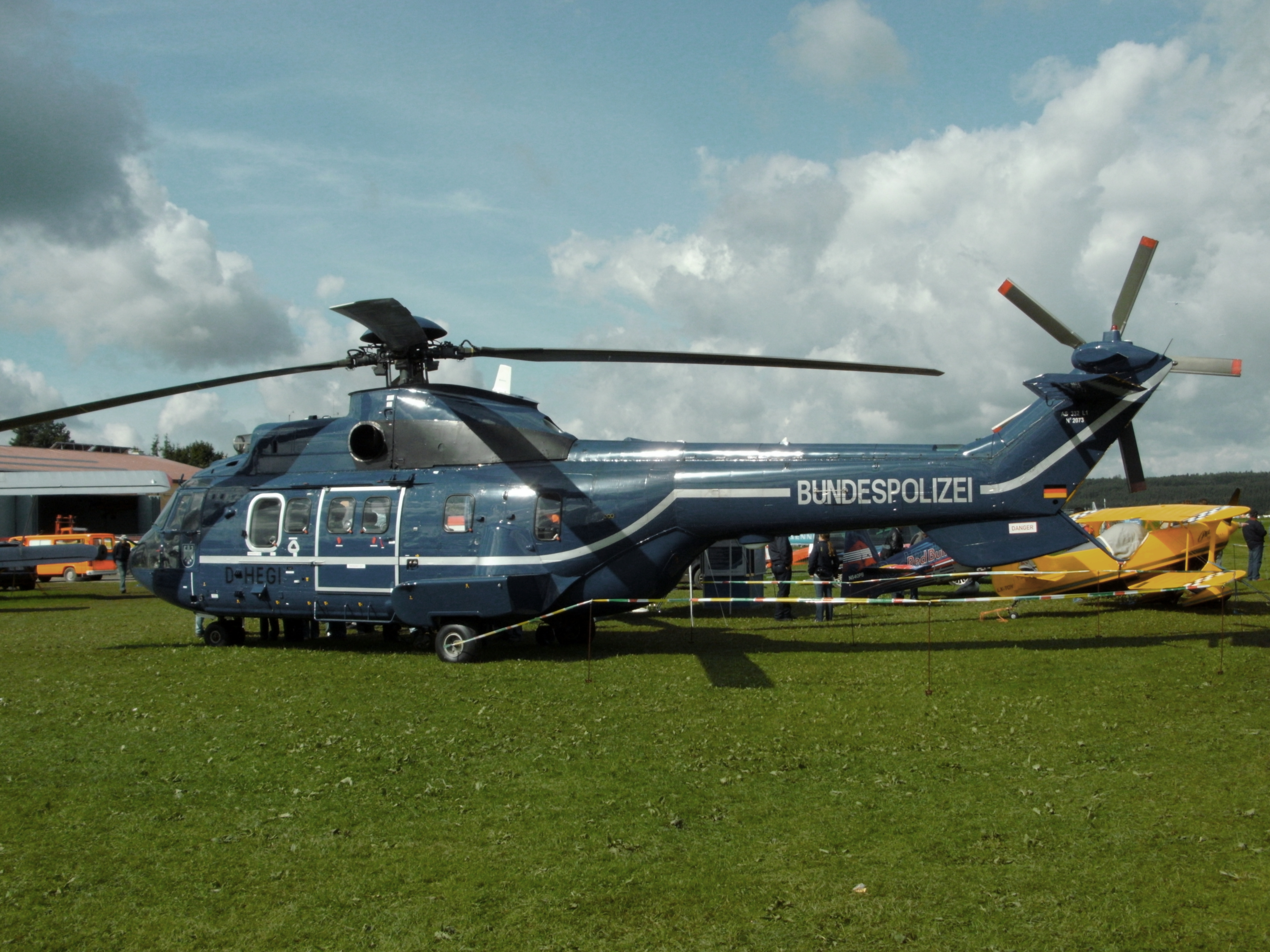
German Bundespolizei (federal police) Eurocopter Super Puma

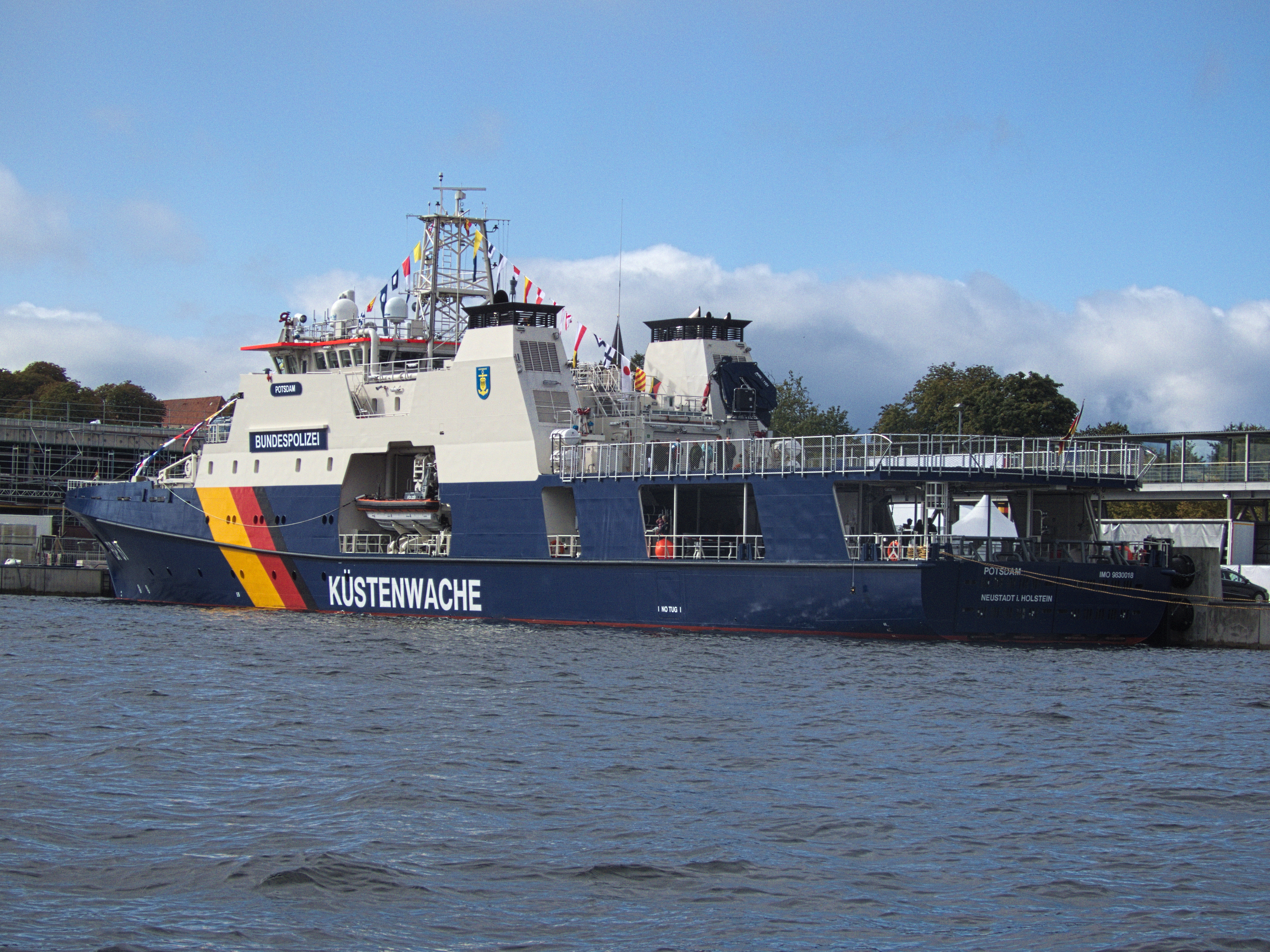
New Bundespolizei offshore patrol vessel BP 81 Potsdam

==== Federal ====
- Bundeskriminalamt (BKA): Federal Criminal Office
  - MEK (Mobiles Einsatzkommando): Special Unit for Surveillance and Detention
- Bundespolizei (BPOL): Federal police
  - Bereitschaftspolizei (BePo): Riot Police Branch of Federal police
    - Beweissicherungs- und Festnahmeeinheit plus (BFE+): Federal Police anti-terror unit for long-lasting operations
    - Beweissicherungs- und Festnahmeeinheit (BFE): Federal Police Special Detention Unit
  - Bundespolizei-Fliegerstaffel (BPOLFLG): Federal Police Air Group
  - Grenzschutzgruppe 9 der Bundespolizei (GSG 9): Federal Police Special Forces Group
  - Mobile Fahndungseinheit (MFE): Special Unit for Covered (Individual and Technical) Surveillance
  - Polizeiliche Schutzaufgaben Ausland (PSA BPOL): Protection force for the security of German diplomatic missions
- Bundeszollverwaltung: Federal Customs Service
  - Zollkriminalamt (ZKA): Customs Investigation Bureau
    - Zentrale Unterstützungsgruppe Zoll (ZUZ): Customs SWAT Unit
- Feldjägertruppe: Military Police of the Federal Defense Force
- Küstenwache: Coast Guard, it is not separate agency, it consists of units compiled of ships and personnel of the Federal Police, Customs Service, the Wasser und Schifffahrtsverwaltung des Bundes (WSV) (Federal Waterways and Shipping Administration) and the Bundesanstalt für Landwirtschaft und Ernährung (BLE) (Federal Agency for Agriculture and Nutrition)
- Polizei beim Deutschen Bundestag (Polizei DBT): Federal Parliament Police

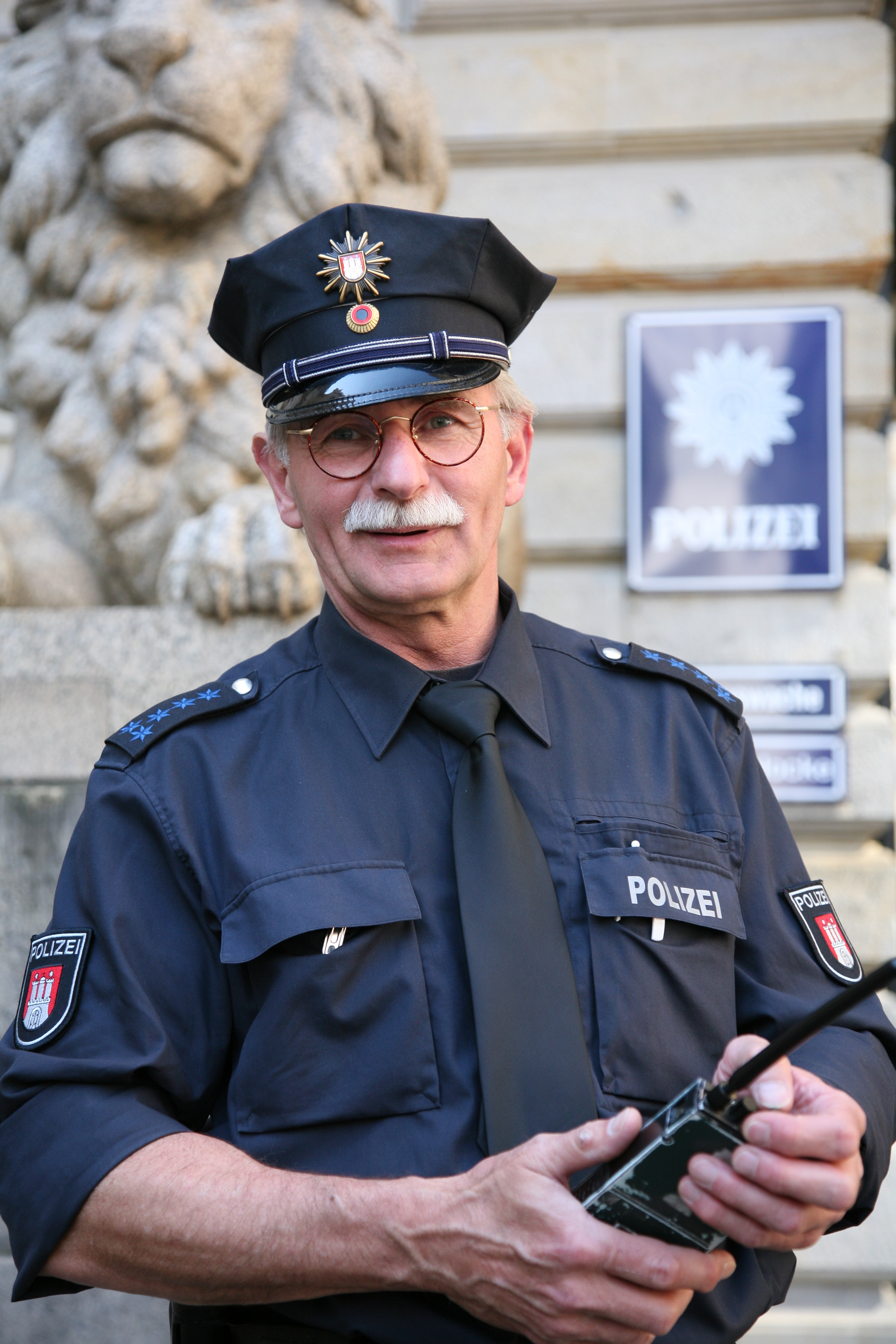
Landespolizei (state police) officer in Hamburg (Germany)

==== State ====
- Landespolizei: State Police
  - Schutzpolizei (SchuPo): Uniformed branch of state police
  - Landeskriminalamt (LKA): State criminal office / state investigative service
    - Mobiles Einsatzkommando (MEK): Special Unit for Surveillance and Detention
  - Kriminalpolizei (Kripo): Detective branch of state police
  - Bereitschaftspolizei (BePo): Riot police branch of state police
    - Beweissicherungs- und Festnahmeeinheit (BFE): State Police Special Detention Unit
  - Spezialeinsatzkommando (SEK): SWAT unit of State Police
  - Autobahnpolizei: Highway patrol of state police
  - Wasserschutzpolizei (WSP): River branch of state police
  - Wachpolizei (WaPol): Branch of state police for the security of state government buildings or diplomatic facilities, only in the states of Berlin and Hesse
  - Freiwilliger Polizeidienst: Auxiliary police force, only in the states of Baden-Württemberg and Hesse
  - Sicherheitspartner: Auxiliary police force, only in the state of Brandenburg
  - Sicherheitswacht: Auxiliary police force, only in the states of Bavaria and Saxony
- Justiz: Penitentiary police

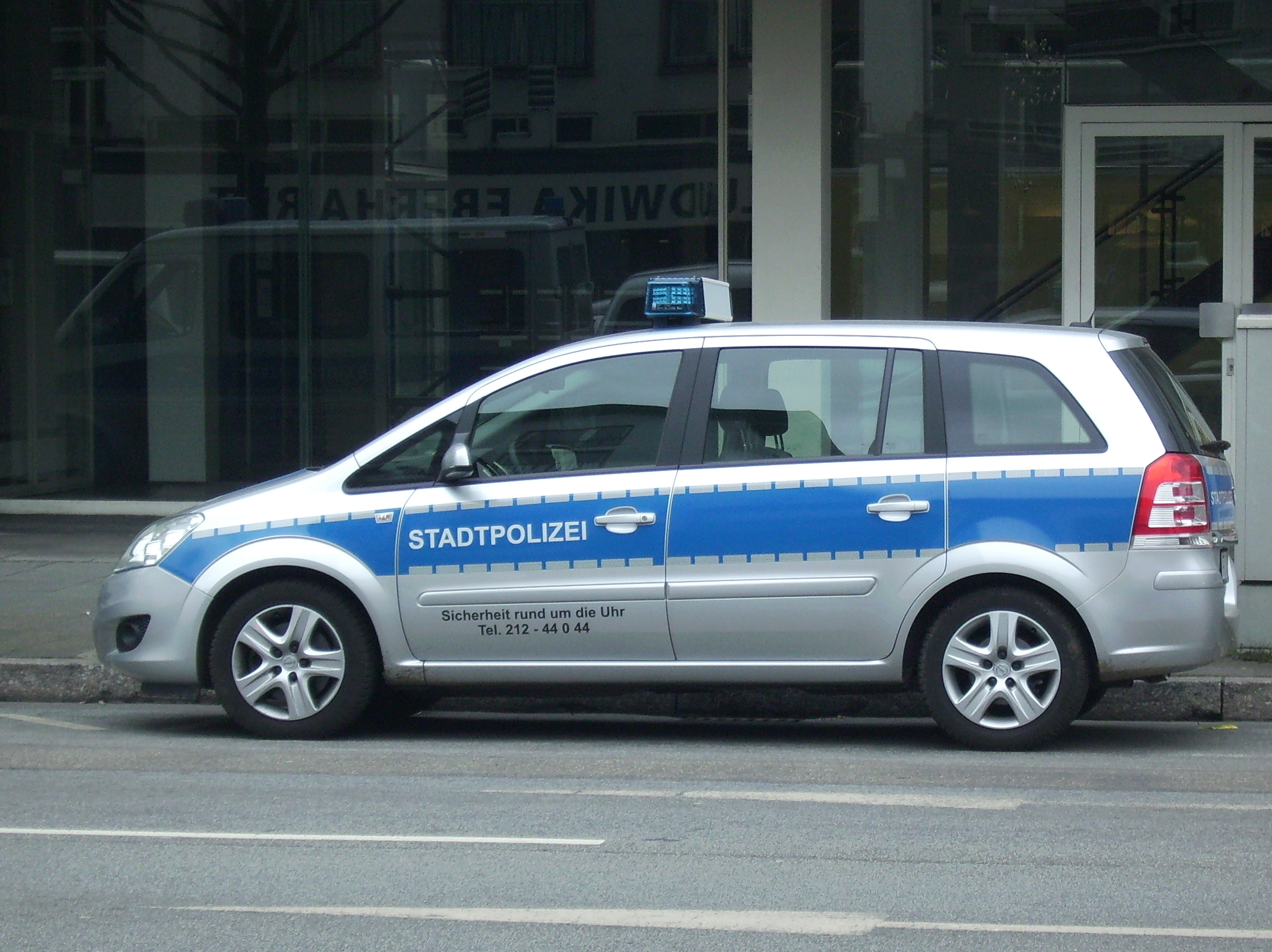
Car of the Stadtpolizei in Frankfurt

- in Bavaria solely
  - Bayerische Grenzpolizei (GrePo): Border police of the state of Bavaria from 1946 until 1998 and re-established in 2018
  - Unterstützungskommando (USK): State police support commando, similar tasks like the BFE of other states

==== Municipalities ====
- Kommunaler Ordnungsdienst (KOD): Municipal law enforcement, different regulations by state and local laws
- Kommunalpolizei or Stadtpolizei: Municipal police in cities of the state of Hesse
- Gemeindevollzugsdienst (GVD): Municipal police in the state of Baden-Württemberg
- Ordnungsamt (OA): Municipal police or municipal law enforcement, different regulations by state and local laws
- Polizeibehörde: municipal law enforcement, different regulations by state and local laws
- Stadtwacht: municipal law enforcement in the state of North Rhine-Westphalia (NRW)
- North Rhine-Westphalia Police

=== Greece ===
- Hellenic Police Service – created in 1984 from the below agencies:
  - Hellenic Gendarmerie (1833–1984)
  - Cities Police (1920– 1984)
- Hellenic Coast Guard
- Hellenic Fire Service
- Municipal Police
- Y.E.F.K.K ( Greek prison guard)
- Greek Military Police

=== Hungary ===
- Hungarian National Police
- Hungarian Border Guard
- Hungarian Customs and Excise Authority

=== Iceland ===
- Directorate of Customs
- National Police of Iceland
- Icelandic Prison Service

=== Ireland ===
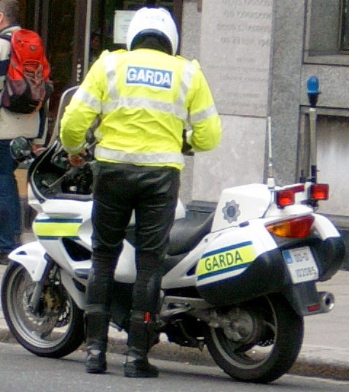
A member of the motorcycle unit of the Garda Síochána.

- Garda Síochána
  - Criminal Assets Bureau (joint unit between the Garda and Irish Sheriff Service)
  - Civic Guard (disbanded and merged into the Garda Síochána in 1923)
  - Dublin Metropolitan Police (disbanded and merged into the Garda Síochána in 1925)
- Garda Síochána Reserve (Reserve police force that works with and assists regular Police)
- Irish Revenue
  - Irish Customs Service
  - Irish Sheriff Service
- Irish security forces
- Irish Prison Service
- Irish Naturalisation and Immigration Service
  - Border Management Unit
- Airport Police (Ireland) Irish Aviation Police Service in Irish state owned airports
- Irish Military Police (Corps of the Irish Defence Forces which enforce military law)

=== Isle of Man ===
- Isle of Man Constabulary
- Isle of Man Airport Police

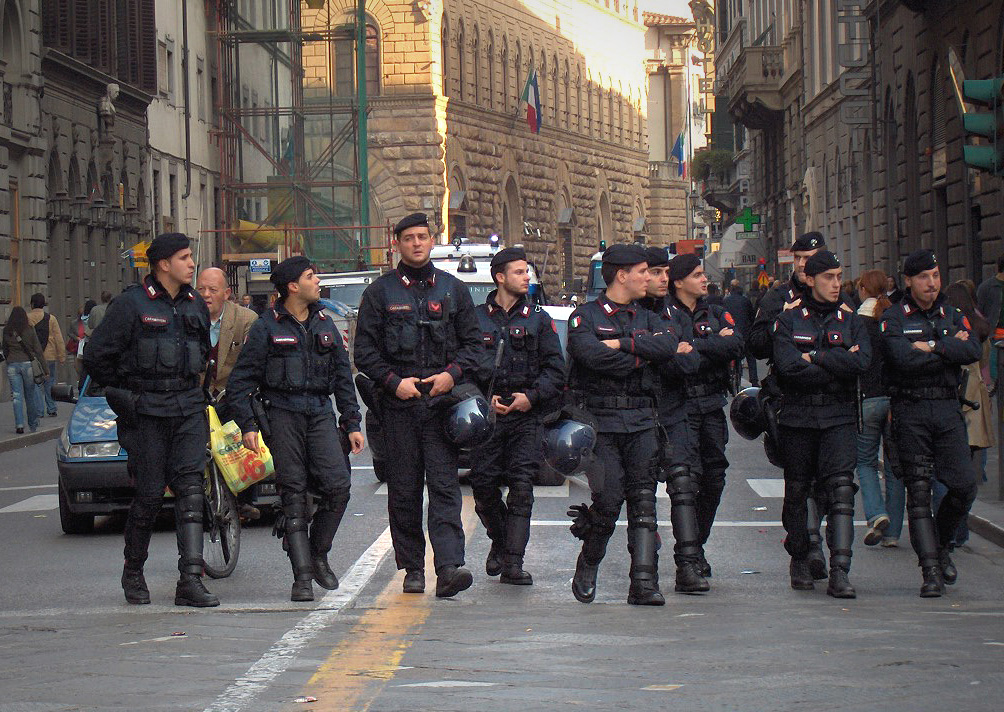
"Carabinieri" in Florence, Italy

=== Italy ===
National

- Carabinieri (Paramilitary Police – military corps)
  - Corazzieri (Cuirassiers): Guard of honour
  - Gruppo di intervento speciale (Special Intervention Group)
  - Raggruppamento Operativo Speciale (Special Operations Group)

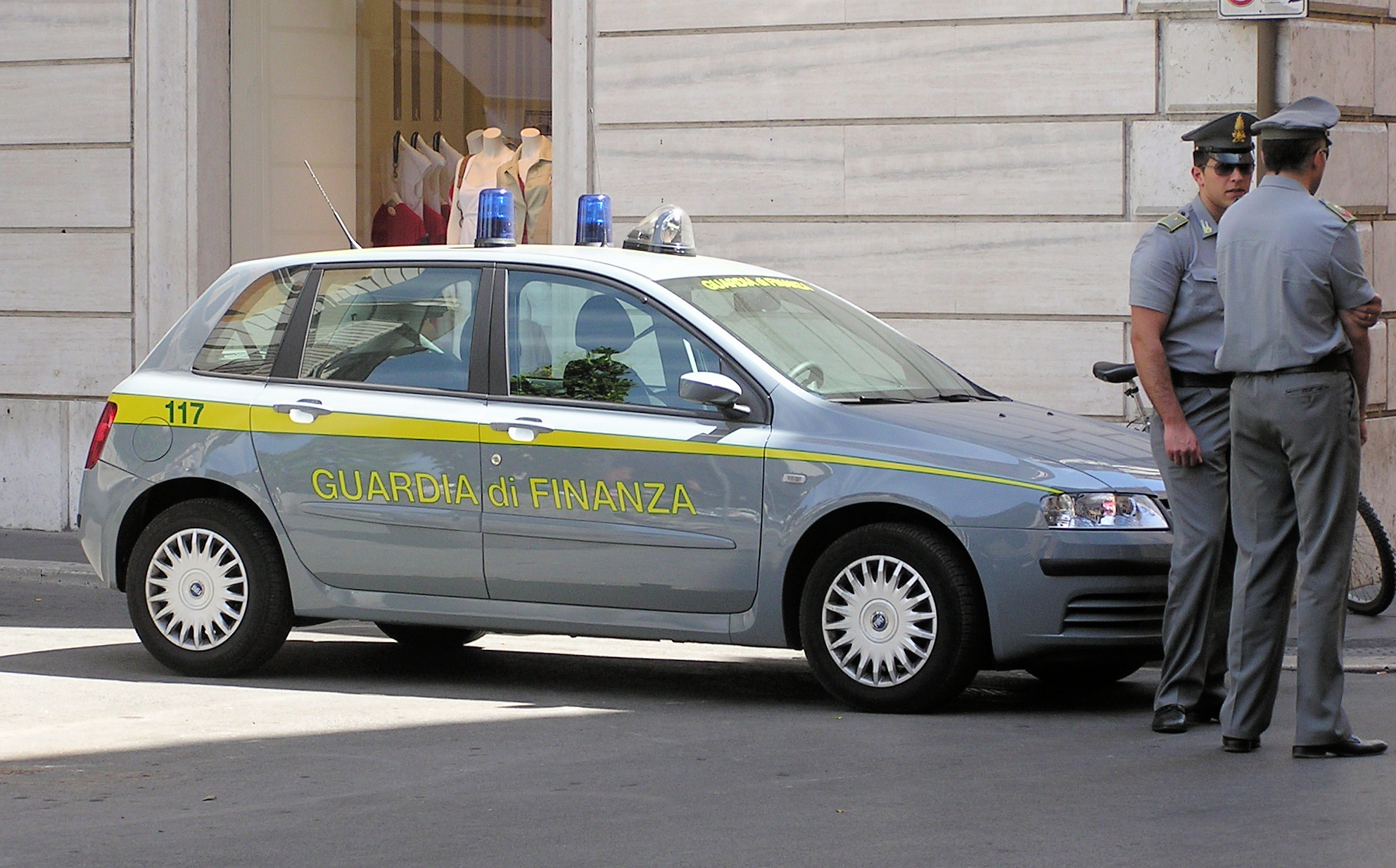
Guardia di Finanza police in central Rome.

- Guardia di Finanza (Border Police, Financial and Customs Police, is also a military corps)
  - Antiterrorismo Pronto Impiego (Anti-Terrorism)
  - Gruppo di investigazione criminalità organizzata (Organized Crime Investigation Group)
  - Gruppo Operativo Antidroga (Counter-narcotics Group)
  - Gruppo Anticrimine Tecnologico (Counter-cybercrime Group)
  - Comando Operativo Aeronavale (Air-Naval Operational Command)
  - Servizio Cinofili (Police Dog Division K9)

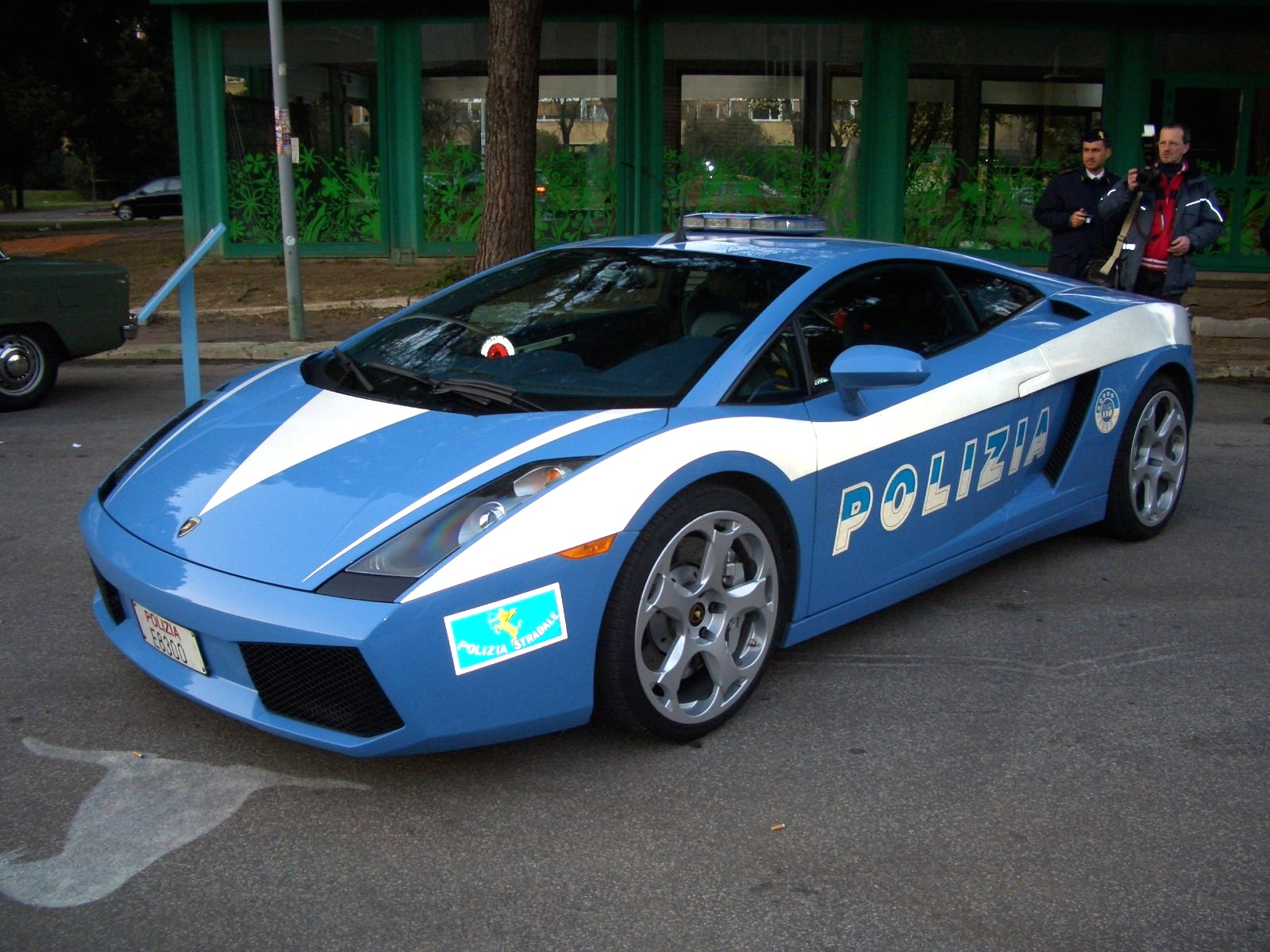
Polizia di Stato Lamborghini Gallardo

- Polizia di Stato (State Police)
  - Nucleo Operativo Centrale di Sicurezza (Central Security Operations Service)
  - Polizia Stradale (Traffic Police)
  - Polizia Ferroviaria (Railroad Police)
- Polizia Penitenziaria (Penitentiary Police), part of the Ministry of Justice (Ministero della Giustizia)

Provincial

- Polizia Provinciale (Provincial Police) that mainly enforce hunting and fishing laws, it consists of several organizations (not a LEA by itself)

Municipal

- Polizia Municipale (Municipal Police; originally called the Vigiles or Vigili Urbani), it consists of several organizations (not a LEA by itself)

=== Kosovo ===
- Kosovo Police

=== Latvia ===
- Latvian State Police
- Latvian State Security Police
- Latvian State Border Guard

=== Lichtenstein ===
- Liechtenstein Police

=== Lithuania ===
- Lithuanian National Police
- Special Investigation Service
- Lithuanian State Border Guard Service
- Public Security Service
- Lithuanian Military Police
- Financial Crime Investigation Service

=== Luxembourg ===
- Grand Ducal Police

=== Malta ===
- Malta Police Force

=== Moldova ===
- Moldovan Ministry of the Interior
  - Moldovan National Police

=== Monaco ===
- Sûreté Publique de Monaco (Police)
- Compagnie des Carabiniers du Prince de Monaco (Prince's Guard)

=== Montenegro ===
- Montenegro Civil Police

=== The Netherlands ===
- Royal Marechaussee (military police/gendarmerie)
- National police corps
- Fiscal Information and Investigation Service

=== North Macedonia ===
- Macedonian Police Service

=== Norway ===
- Norwegian Police Service

=== Poland ===
- Policja (Police)
- Żandarmeria Wojskowa (Military Gendarmerie)
- Straż Graniczna (Border Guard)
- Agencja Bezpieczeństwa Wewnętrznego (Internal Security Agency)
- Centralne Biuro Antykorupcyjne (Central Anti-corruption Bureau)
- Służba Celno-Skarbowa (Customs and Revenue Service)
- Straż Miejska (City Guard)

=== Portugal ===
Civilian

- Ministério da Administração Interna
- Guarda Nacional Republicana (gendarmerie)
- Polícia de Segurança Pública (civilian police)
  - Grupo de Operações Especiais
- Polícia Judiciária (investigation police)
- Serviço de Estrangeiros e Fronteiras (equivalent to US ICE)
- Autoridade Segurança Alimentar e Economica ASAE (a mix equivalent to US FDA and an Economic crime police)

Military

- Ministério da Defesa Nacional
- Polícia do Exército (Portuguese Army military police)
- Unidade de Polícia Naval (Portuguese Navy military police, part of the Portuguese Marine Corps)
- Polícia Aérea (Portuguese Air Force military police)
- Polícia Marítima (maritime police, part of the Portuguese Navy)

=== Romania ===
- Poliția Română (Romanian Police, national police force)
- Poliția de Frontieră (Border Police)
- Jandarmeria Română (Romanian Gendarmerie, has military status)
- Poliția Locală (Local Police)
- Direcția Generală Anticorupție (Internal Affairs)
- Direcția Națională Anticorupție (anti-corruption agency)
- Financial Guard

=== Russia ===
- Ministry of Internal Affairs
  - Police of Russia
- Rosgvardia (National Guard of Russia)
- Federal Protective Service – protection of high rank officials
  - Presidential Security Service – concerned with the tasks related to the protection of the President of Russia.
- Federal Security Service – Federal anti-terror and counter-espionnage Service
  - The Federal Border Guard Service is subordinate to the FSB and responsible for Maritime surveillance.
- The Ministry of Russia for Civil Defense, Emergencies and Elimination of Consequences of Natural Disasters ("EMERCOM") is responsible for the civil defence regulation, protection from fire and has own troops.
- The Ministry of Justice of Russia
  - Federal service of Punishment Execution (FSIN) is responsible for the penal correction and prison system.
- The Ministry of Defence of Russia
  - Russian Military Police
- Investigative Committee of Russia – Investigative body, struggling the Corruption and High Criminal Affairs ("The Russian FBI"). Created on 15 January 2011.

=== San Marino ===
- Gendarmeria (paramilitary police)
- Polizia Civile (civilian police)
- Guardia di Rocca (border patrol and permanent military force)

=== Serbia ===
- Bezbednosno Informativna Agencija (BIA)
- Serbian Ministry of the Interior (MUP)
- Gendarmery (Serbia)

=== Slovakia ===
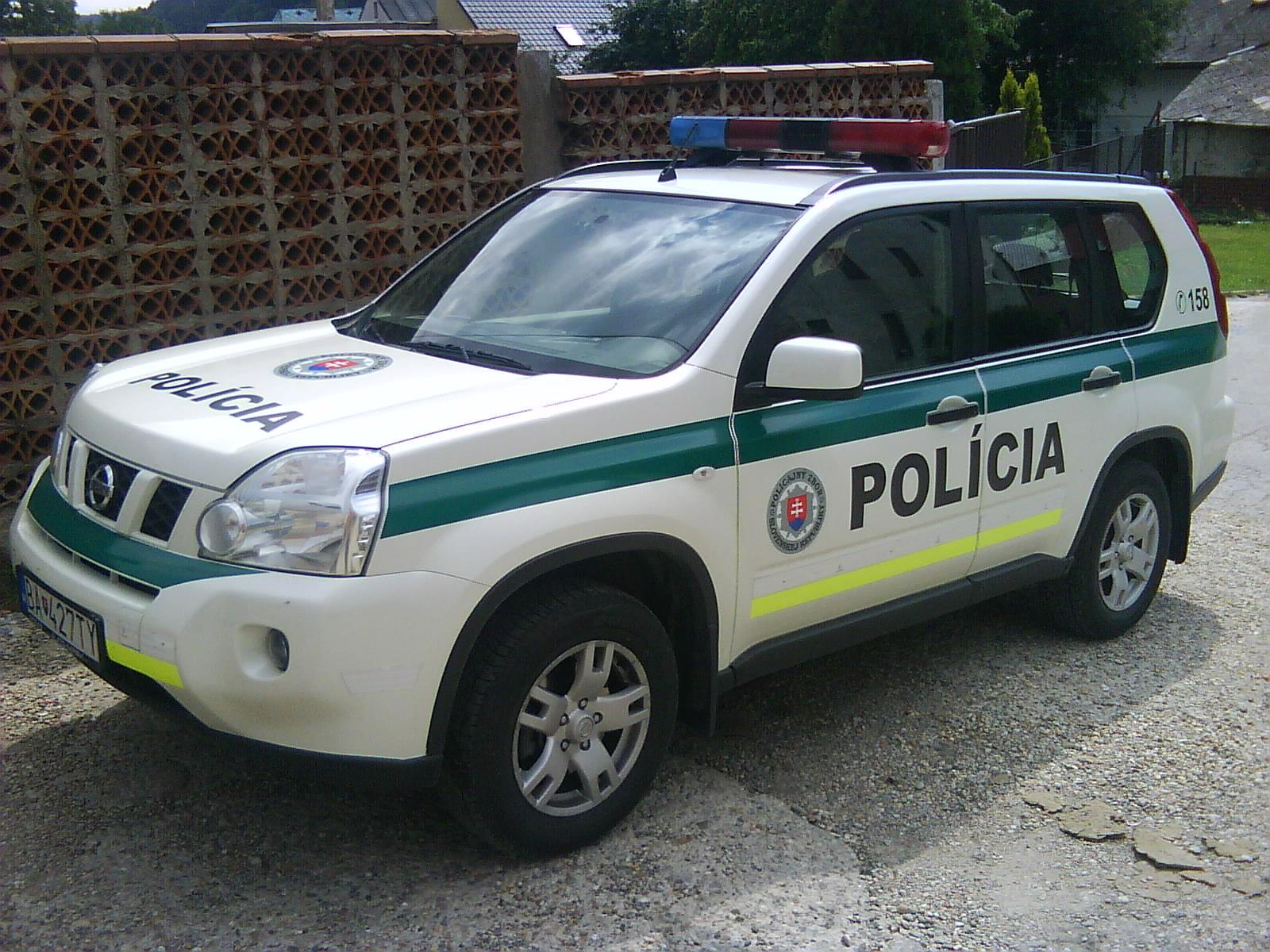
Car of National Police in Slovakia

National

- Slovak Police Force

Municipal

- mestská polícia (Municipal police)

=== Slovenia ===
- Slovenian National Police
- Specialna Enota Policije

=== Spain ===
National

- Guardia Civil
- Cuerpo Nacional de Policía (National Police Corps)
- Dirección de Instituciones Penitenciarias (Directorate of Penitentiary Institutions)
- Servicio de Vigilancia Aduanera (Customs Surveillance Service)

Autonomous communities

- Ertzaintza in the Basque Country
- Mossos d'Esquadra in Catalonia
- Policía Foral in Navarre

Municipal

- Policía Municipal (also known as Policía Local or Guardia Urbana) in every town and city.
- Autoridad Portuaria (Port Police)

=== Sweden ===
- Ministry of Justice
  - Polismyndigheten
  - Säkerhetspolisen
  - Ekobrottsmyndigheten
  - Kustbevakningen
  - Kriminalvården
- Ministry of Finance
  - Tullverket
- Ministry of Defence
  - Militärpolisen

=== Switzerland ===
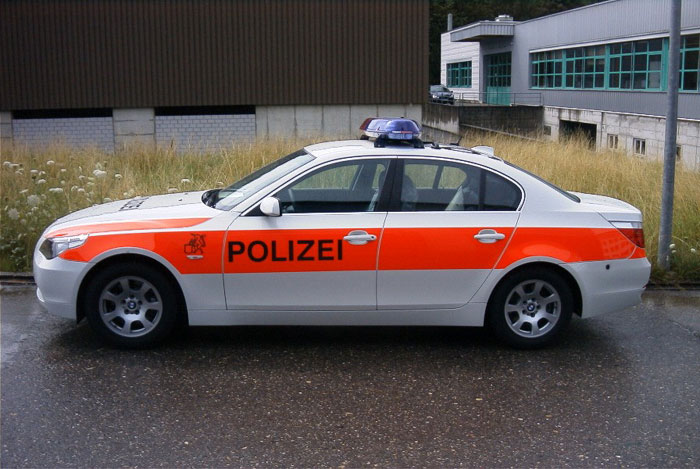
Swiss police car

- Border Guard Corps
- Federal Office of Police
  - Cybercrime Coordination Unit Switzerland (CYCO) German: Koordinationsstelle zur Bekämpfung der Internetkriminalität (KOBIC), (French: Service de coordination de la lutte contre la criminalité sur Internet (SCOCI), Italian: Servizio di coordinazione per la lotta contro la criminalità su Internet (SCOCI))
- Cantonal police (French: Police cantonale, German: Kantonspolizei, Romansh: Polizia Chantunala, Italian: Polizia cantonale)
- Municipal police (French: Police municipale, German: Stadtpolizei, Romansh: Polizia Cumûnala, Italian: Polizia Municipale)

=== Türkiye ===
- General Directorate of Security (Turkish: Emniyet Genel Müdürlüğü)
- Gendarmerie General Command(Turkey) (Turkish: Jandarma)
- Military Police (Turkey) (Turkish: Askeri İnzibat)
- National Intelligence Organization (Turkish: Millî İstihbarat Teşkilâtı)
- Coast Guard Command (Turkish: Sahil Güvenlik Komutanlığı)
- Municipal Police (Turkish: Zabıta)
- General Directorate of Customs Protection (Turkish: Gümrükler Muhafaza Genel Müdürlüğü)
- General Directorate of Forest Protection (Turkish: Orman Muhafaza)
- General Directorate of Prisons and Detention Houses
- National Parks Game Enforcement (Turkish: Milli Parklar Av Muhafaza)
- Gendarmerie Intelligence Organization (Turkish: Jandarma İstihbarat ve Terörle Mücadele)

=== Ukraine ===
- National Police of Ukraine
- National Guard of Ukraine
- State Border Guard Service of Ukraine
- National Anti-corruption Bureau of Ukraine
- Economic Security Bureau of Ukraine
- Military Police
- State Criminal-Executive Service of Ukraine
- Prosecution of Ukraine
- State Bureau of Investigation
- Security Service of Ukraine
- State Security Administration
- State Customs Service of Ukraine
- Court Security Service
- Fish patrol
- State forest protection
- Special Police Forces (Ukraine)

=== United Kingdom ===
Territorial police forces

Territorial police forces' area in the UK

- Avon and Somerset Constabulary
- Bedfordshire Police
- Cambridgeshire Constabulary
- Cheshire Constabulary
- City of London Police
- Cleveland Police
- Cumbria Constabulary
- Derbyshire Constabulary
- Devon and Cornwall Police
- Dorset Police
- Durham Constabulary
- Dyfed-Powys Police (Heddlu Dyfed Powys)
- Essex Police
- Gloucestershire Constabulary
- Greater Manchester Police
- Gwent Police (Heddlu Gwent)
- Hampshire Constabulary
- Hertfordshire Constabulary
- Humberside Police
- Kent Police
- Lancashire Constabulary
- Leicestershire Police
- Lincolnshire Police
- Merseyside Police
- Metropolitan Police (London, excluding the City of London)
- Norfolk Constabulary
- Northamptonshire Police
- North Wales Police (Heddlu Gogledd Cymru)
- Northumbria Police
- North Yorkshire Police
- Nottinghamshire Police
- Police Scotland
- Police Service of Northern Ireland
- South Wales Police (Heddlu De Cymru)
- South Yorkshire Police
- Staffordshire Police
- Suffolk Constabulary
- Surrey Police
- Sussex Police
- Thames Valley Police
- Warwickshire Police
- West Mercia Police
- West Midlands Police
- West Yorkshire Police
- Wiltshire Police

National police forces

- National Crime Agency
- Ministry of Defence Police
- National Wildlife Crime Unit
- National Domestic Extremism and Disorder Intelligence Unit
- National Counter Terrorism Security Office
- Protection Command
- National Fraud Intelligence Bureau
- National Vehicle Crime Intelligence Service
- British Transport Police (Great Britain)
- Civil Nuclear Constabulary (Great Britain)
- National Ballistics Intelligence Service (Great Britain)
- National Police Air Service (England and Wales)

National non-police law enforcement forces

- Office for Security and Counter-Terrorism
- Security Service
- Border Force
- Immigration Enforcement
- His Majesty's Revenue and Customs
- Driver and Vehicle Standards Agency (Great Britain)
- Driver and Vehicle Agency (Northern Ireland)
- Serious Fraud Office (England, Wales and Northern Ireland)
- Independent Police Complaints Commission (England and Wales)

Military Service police forces

- Royal Navy Police
- Royal Military Police
- Royal Air Force Police
- Royal Marines Police
- Regimental Police

British Overseas Territories police forces

- Bermuda Police Service
- British Indian Ocean Territory Police
- Pitcairn Islands Police
- Royal Cayman Islands Police Service
- Royal Falkland Islands Police
- Royal Montserrat Police Service
- Royal Virgin Islands Police Force
- Saint Helena Police Service
- Royal Gibraltar Police

MOD overseas police forces

- Sovereign Base Areas Police
- Gibraltar Defence Police

Overseas service police forces

- British Indian Ocean Territory Joint Service Police Unit
- Cyprus Joint Police Unit
- Falkland Islands Joint Service Police Security Unit
- Gibraltar Joint Provost and Security Unit

=== Vatican ===
- Corpo della Gendarmeria (known as the Corpo di Vigilanza until 2002)
- Swiss Guard

== North America ==
=== Antigua and Barbuda ===
- Royal Police Force of Antigua and Barbuda
- Antigua and Barbuda Defence Force
  - Antigua and Barbuda Regiment
  - Antigua and Barbuda Coast Guard

=== Bahamas ===
- Royal Bahamas Defence Force
- Royal Bahamas Police Force
- Bahamas Department of Correctional Services
- Bahamas Customs Service
- Bahamas Immigration Service

=== Barbados ===
- Barbados Defence Force
  - Barbados Regiment
  - Barbados Coast Guard
- Barbados Police Service

=== Belize ===
- Belize Defence Force
  - Ground Forces
  - Air Wing
  - Maritime Wing
  - Volunteer Guard
- Royal Belize Police Force

=== Bermuda ===
- Bermuda Police Service
- Bermuda Reserve Police
- Bermuda International Airport Security Police

=== Canada ===
A Royal Canadian Mounted Police officer stands watch over detained migrants aboard R-V Strait Hunter, which was simulating a migrant vessel, 8 May 2012, in Sydney, Nova Scotia, Canada, during exercise 120508-N-IL267-082

==== Federal ====
- Canada Border Services Agency
- Canadian Coast Guard
- Canadian Forces Military Police
- Royal Canadian Mounted Police
- Canadian National Railway Police
- Parliamentary Protective Service
- Environment Canada Federal Game Officers
- Parks Canada Park Wardens
- Fisheries and Oceans Canada Fishery Enforcement Officers
- Correctional Service of Canada
- Canadian Pacific Railway Police
- Transport Canada Enforcement
  - Ports Canada Police
  - Combined Forces Special Enforcement Unit-British Columbia

==== Provincial ====
- Ontario Provincial Police
- Royal Newfoundland Constabulary
- Sûreté du Québec
- Alberta Sheriffs Branch
- British Columbia Sheriff Service
- Ontario Correctional Services
- Ontario Highway Carrier Safety and Enforcement
- Yukon Sheriffs Office
- Saskatchewan Sheriff Service
- Prince Edward Island Sheriff Services
- Niagara Parks Police Service
- Nova Scotia Sheriff Office
- NorthWest Territories Sheriff Office
- Manitoba Sheriff Service
- New Brunswick Sheriff’s Service
- Nunavut Sheriff Office

==== Municipal ====
- Abbotsford Police Department
- Aymler Police
- Altona Police Service
- Barrie Police Service
- Belleville Police Service
- Brantford Police Service
- Bathurst City Police Service
- Beresford, Nigadoo, Petit-Rocher and Pointe-Verte Regional Police Service
- Service de police de la Ville de Bromont
- Brandon Police Service
- Brockville Police Service
- Service de police de la Ville de Blainville
- Service de police de la MRC des Collines-de-I'Outaouais
- Charlottetown Police Department
- Cornwallis Police Service
- Cobourg Police Service
- Cornwall Police Service
- Corman Park Police Service
- Calgary Police Service
- Camrose Police Service
- Central Saanich Police Service
- Service de police de la Chateauguay
- Chatham-Kent Police Service
- Charlottetown Police Service
- Dalmeny Police Service
- Deep River Police Service
- Durham Regional Police Service
- Delta Police Department
- Regie de police de Lac des Deux-Montagnes
- Edmonton Police Service
- Edmondton Police Service
- Estevan Police Service
- Fredericton Police Force
- Fire Hills First Nation Police Service
- Service de police la Ville de Granby
- Gananoque Police Service
- Greater Sudbury Police Service
- Grand Falls Police Service
- Gatineau Police
- Halifax Regional Police
- Halton Regional Police Service
- Hamilton Police Service
- Hanover Police Service
- Kensington Police Service
- Kennebecasis Regional Police Service
- Kingston Police Service
- Kawartha Lakes Police Service
- Longuenuil Police Service
- Laval Police Service
- Service de police de la Ville de Levis
- Luseland Police Service
- Lethbridge Police Service
- LaSallee Police Service
- Lacombe Police Service
- London Police Service
- Lakeland Districts Protective Services
- Service de la securite publique Ville de Mascouche
- Regie de police de Memphremagog
- Moose Jaw Police Service
- Miramichi Police Service
- Morden Police Service
- Medicine Hat Police Service
- Service de police Mercier
- Service de police Mirabel
- Montreal Police Service
- Nelson Police Department
- Niagara Parks Police Service
- Niagara Regional Police Service
- New Westminster Police Department
- North Bay Police Service
- Ottawa Police Service
- Owen Sound Police Service
- Oak Bay Police Department
- Peterborough Police Service
- Port Moody Police Department
- Port Hope Police Service
- Peel Regional Police
- Quebec City Police
- Regie intermuniciple de police de Roussillon
- Rivière-du-Nord Police
- Regie intermuniciple de police Richelieu-Saint-Laurent
- Regina Police Service
- Service de securite publique de la Ville de Repentigny
- Regie intermuniciple de police Saint-Jean-sur-Richelieu
- Saskatoon Police Service
- Sarnia Police Service
- Service de police de la Ville de Saint-Jerome
- Springfield Police Service
- Service de securite publique de Saguenay
- Sault Ste. Marie Police Service
- Securite publique de Saint-Eustache
- Saugeen Shores Police Service
- Summerside Police Department
- Saint-Anne Police Service
- Saint John Police Service
- Sainthead Police Service
- Surrey Police Service
- Saanich Police Department
- Saskatoon Police Service
- Smiths Falls Police Service
- South Coast British Columbia Transportation Authority Police Service
- South Simcoe Police Service
- Strafford Police Service
- St. Thomas Police Service
- Service de police de I'Assomption/St-Sulpice
- Strathroy-Caradoc Police Service
- Service de police de la Ville de Sherbrooke
- Service de police de la Terrbonne
- Timmins Police Service
- Regie intermuniciplae de police de Therese-de-Blanville
- Service de securite publique de Trois-Rivieres
- Taber Police Service
- Toronto Police Service
- Thunder Bay Police Service
- Vancouver Police Department
- Victoria Police Department
- Victoria Beach Police
- Vancoy Police Service
- Windsor Police Service
- Whitehead Police Service
- Waterloo Regional Police Service
- West Grey Police
- Woodstock Police Force
- Woodstock Police Service
- Winkler Police Service
- Weyburn Police Service
- West Vancouver Police Department
- Winnipeg Police Service
- York Regional Police

=== Costa Rica ===
- Public Force of Costa Rica

=== Cuba ===
- National Revolutionary Police Force (PNR)

=== Dominica, Commonwealth of ===
- Commonwealth of Dominica Police Force (CDPF)

=== Dominican Republic ===
- Policia Nacional Dominicana
- Dirección Nacional de Control de Drogas (DNCD)
- Departamento Nacional de Investigaciones (DNI)

=== El Salvador ===
- Policía Nacional civil de El Salvador

=== Grenada ===
- Royal Grenada Police Force

=== Guatemala ===
- Guatemalan Policía Nacional

=== Haiti ===
- Haitian National Police
  - Haitian Coast Guard Commission
- United Nations Stabilisation Mission in Haiti
- Army Force of Haiti (FAd'H)

=== Honduras ===
- Honduran National Police

=== Jamaica ===
- Jamaica Constabulary Force
- Jamaica Defence Force
- Department of Correctional Services Jamaica
- Major Organised Crime and Anti-Corruption Agency (MOCA)
- Financial Services Commission (FSC)
- Municipal Police
- Financial Investigations Division(FID)
- Jamaica Customs Agency (JCA)
- Passport, Immigration and Citizenship Agency (PICA)

=== Mexico ===
- Law enforcement in Mexico

==== Federal ====
- Federales (former federal law enforcement agencies of Mexico):
  - Federal Police (Policía Federal), former Policía Federal Preventiva (Federal Preventive Police, 1999–2009), disbanded in 2019
  - 3rd Military Police Brigade from the Mexican Army
  - Policía Federal de Caminos (Federal Highway Police, 1928–1999)
- Guardia Nacional, since 2019, a gendarmerie that replaced the former civilian agency
- Policía Federal Ministerial (Federal Ministerial Police; since 2019, Coordinación de Métodos de Investigación, Investigative Methods Coordination), federal investigative agency under the authority of Fiscalía General de la República (Attorney General of Mexico)

==== State and local ====
- State police (Policía Estatal, its official name may vary from state to state), 32 independent agencies under each State's governor authority
- State Ministerial Police (Policía Estatal Ministerial, its mame also may vary), under each State's Attorney authority
- Local or Municipal Police (Policía municipal). Most of 2,454 Municipalities of Mexico have its own Police Department under mayor's (presidente municipal) authority
- Mexico City Police in both state and municipal duties throughout the 16 boroughs of Mexico City

=== Nicaragua ===
- Nicaraguan Policía Nacional

=== Panama ===
- Panamanian Public Forces
  - National Border Service
  - National Aeronaval Service
  - Panamanian National Police
  - Institutional Protection Service

=== Saint Kitts and Nevis ===
- Royal Saint Kitts and Nevis Police Force
- Saint Kitts and Nevis Defence Force

=== Saint Lucia ===
- Royal Saint Lucia Police Force
- Regional Security System

=== Saint Vincent and the Grenadines ===
- Royal Saint Vincent and the Grenadines Police Force
- Regional Security System

=== Trinidad and Tobago ===
- Trinidad and Tobago Police Service

=== United States ===
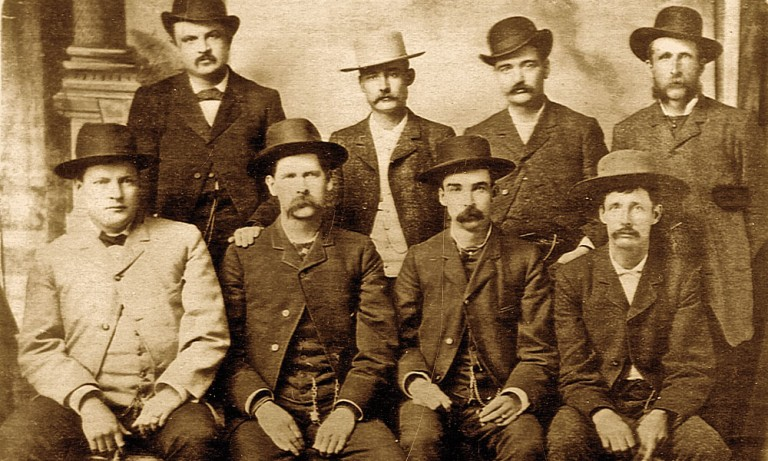
Bat Masterson (standing second from right), Wyatt Earp (sitting second from left), and other Deputy Marshals during the Wild West era. Some of the earliest types of law enforcement in the U.S.

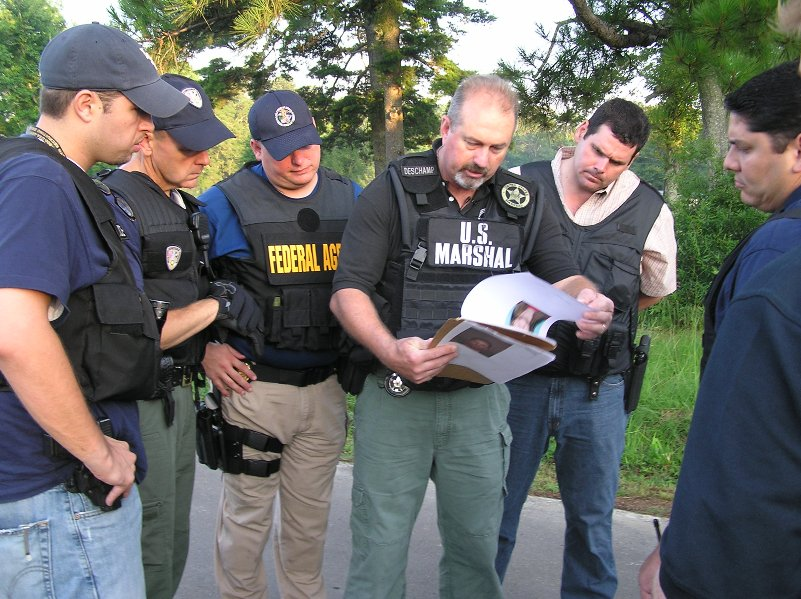
Modern day Deputy Marshals getting prepared for a raid.

- Law enforcement in the United States

==== Federal ====
===== United States Department of State (DOS) =====
- Bureau of Diplomatic Security
  - Diplomatic Security Service (DSS)

===== United States Department of the Treasury =====
- Internal Revenue Service, Criminal Investigation (IRS-CI)
- Office of the Treasury Inspector General for Tax Administration (TIGTA)
- Office of the Special Inspector General for the Troubled Asset Relief Program (SIGTARP)
- Office of the Special Inspector General for Pandemic Recovery (SIGPR)
- United States Mint Police (USMP)
- Bureau of Engraving and Printing Police (BEP Police)

===== United States Department of Defense (DOD) =====
- Defense Criminal Investigative Service (DCIS)
- Pentagon Force Protection Agency
- Defense Logistics Agency Police

Department of the Army

- United States Army Criminal Investigation Division (Army CID)
- United States Army Military Police Corps
- United States Army Counterintelligence (ACI)
- Department of the Army Civilian Police (DACP)
- Department of the Army Civilian Security Guards (DASG)

Department of the Navy

- Naval Criminal Investigative Service (NCIS)
- Master-at-arms (United States Navy)
- Shore Patrol
- Office of Naval Intelligence Police (ONI Police)
- Marine Corps Provost Marshal's Office
  - United States Marine Corps Criminal Investigation Division (USMC CID)
- United States Marine Corps Civilian Police

Department of the Air and Space Force

- United States Air Force Office of Special Investigations (Airforce OSI)
- United States Air Force Security Forces
- Department of the Air Force Police

National Security Agency

- National Security Agency Police (NSA Police)
- Defense Intelligence Agency Police

===== United States Department of Justice (DOJ) =====
- Bureau of Alcohol, Tobacco, Firearms and Explosives (ATF)
- Drug Enforcement Administration (DEA) (since 1973)
  - Bureau of Narcotics and Dangerous Drugs (1968–73)
    - Federal Bureau of Narcotics (1930–68)
      - Bureau of Prohibition (1927–33)
    - Bureau of Drug Abuse Control (1966–68)
- Federal Bureau of Investigation (FBI)
  - Bureau of Investigation (BOI) (1908–35)
- Federal Bureau of Prisons (BOP)
- United States Marshals Service (USMS)

===== United States Department of the Interior (USDI) =====
- Bureau of Indian Affairs Police
- Bureau of Land Management Office of Law Enforcement & Security
- National Park Service
  - National Park Service Rangers
  - United States Park Police
- United States Fish and Wildlife Service Office of Law Enforcement

===== United States Department of Agriculture (USDA) =====
- U.S. Forest Service Law Enforcement and Investigations
- Office of Inspector General

===== United States Department of Commerce (DOC) =====
- National Oceanic and Atmospheric Administration Fisheries Office of Law Enforcement

===== United States Department of Health and Human Services (HHS) =====
- Food and Drug Administration (FDA)
  - Office of Criminal Investigations

===== United States Department of Education (ED) =====
- Office of the Inspector General (OIG)

===== United States Department of Veterans Affairs (VA) =====
- United States Department of Veterans Affairs Police

===== United States Department of Homeland Security (DHS) =====
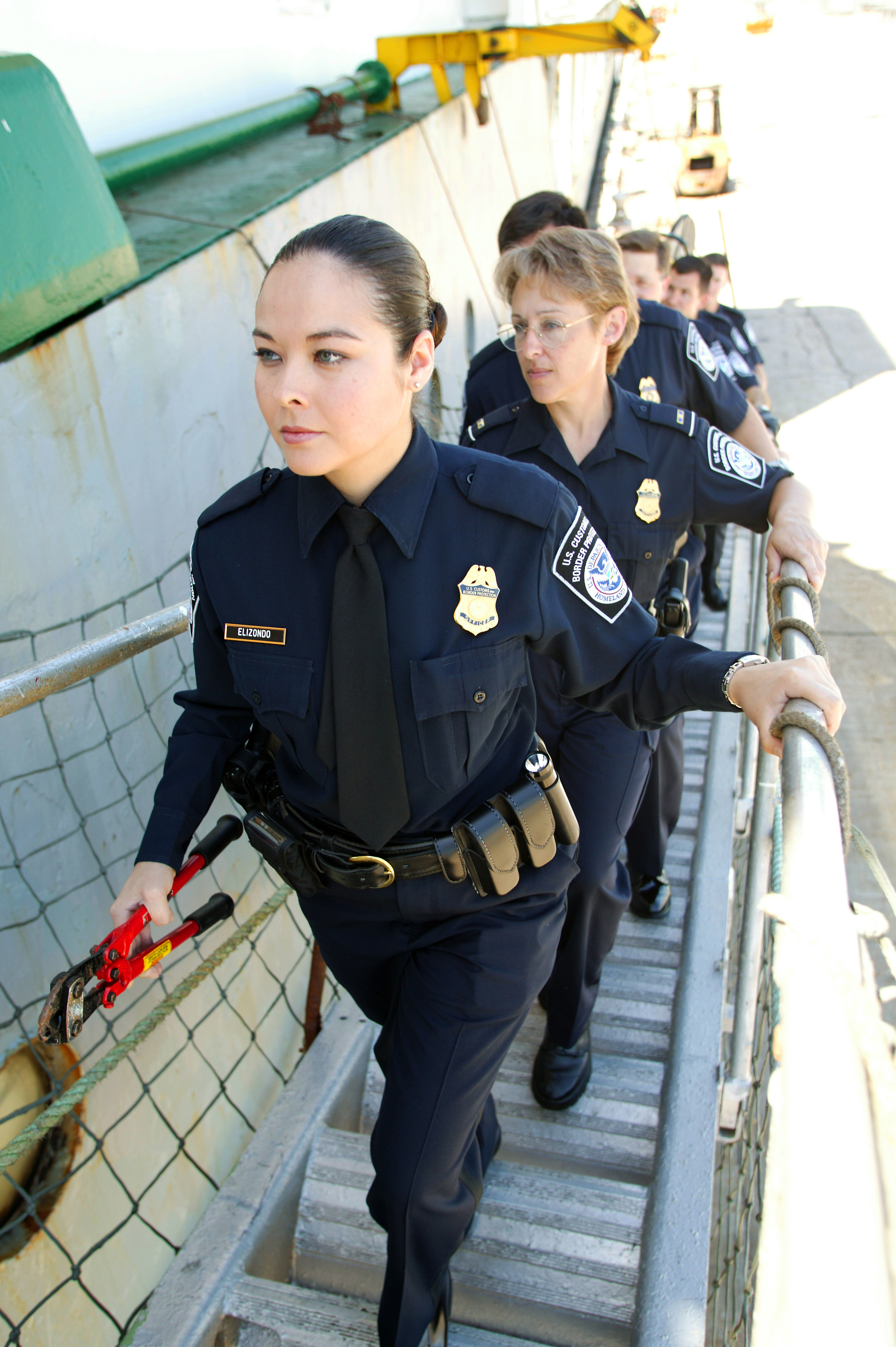
Customs officers board a ship at the US Canada border

- Federal Protective Service (FPS)
- U.S. Coast Guard (USCG)
  - United States Coast Guard Police (CGPD)
  - Coast Guard Investigative Service (CGIS)
  - Deployable Specialized Forces (DSF)
- U.S. Customs and Border Protection (CBP)
  - U.S. Border Patrol (USBP)
- U.S. Immigration and Customs Enforcement (ICE)
- U.S. Secret Service (USSS)
- Transportation Security Administration (TSA)

===== United States Department of Transportation (DOT) =====
- Federal Aviation Administration (FAA)

===== Other federal law enforcement agencies =====
- Central Intelligence Agency Security Protective Service (CIA SPS)
- Federal Reserve Police
- Smithsonian National Zoological Park Police
- United States Capitol Police (USCP)
- United States Postal Inspection Service (USPIS)
- United States Postal Service Office of Inspector General (USPS OIG)
- United States Probation Service (USPO)
- United States Supreme Court Police

==== State, county and municipal ====
- State trooper (United States)
- County sheriff (United States)
- Municipal police (United States)
  - Metropolitan Police Department of the District of Columbia (MPDC)

==== Territorial police ====
===== Commonwealth of Puerto Rico =====
- Puerto Rico Department of Justice
  - Special Investigations Bureau
- Puerto Rico Commonwealth Police (also known as the Policia de Puerto Rico or the Puerto Rico Police Department)
- Puerto Rico Commonwealth Marshal's Office
- Puerto Rico Department of Natural Resources Conservation Rangers
- Puerto Rico Department of Parks and Recreation Park Rangers
- Puerto Rico Ports Authority
  - Puerto Rico Port Authority Police Department (Policia de los Puertos)
- Puerto Rico Department of Corrections and Rehabilitation

===== Territory of Guam =====
- Guam Police Department
- Supreme Court of Guam Deputy Marshals
- Guam Superior Court Deputy Marshals
- Guam Customs and Quarantine Agency
- Port Authority of Guam
  - Guam Port Authority Police
- Antonio B. Won Pat Guam International Airport Police Department
- Guam Department of Agriculture Conservation Officers
- Guam Department of Parks and Recreation Park Patrol Officers
- Guam Department of Corrections

===== Commonwealth of the Northern Mariana Islands =====
- Commonwealth of the Northern Mariana Islands Department of Public Safety
  - Police Division
  - Fire/Rescue Division
- Commonwealth of the Northern Mariana Islands Department of Corrections
- Commonwealth of the Northern Mariana Islands Department of Conservation Conservation Officers
- Commonwealth of the Northern Mariana Islands Ports Authority Police Department

===== Territory of American Samoa =====
- American Samoa Department of Public Safety
  - American Samoa Territorial Police
- Pago Pago International Airport Police Department
- American Samoa Ports Authority Police Department
- American Samoa Community College Police Department

===== Territory of the United States Virgin Islands =====
- United States Virgin Islands Police Department
- United States Virgin Islands Territorial Marshal's Office

==== Railroad Police ====
- Union Pacific Police Department
- BNSF Police Department
- CSX Police Department
- Norfolk Southern Police Department
- Amtrak Police Department (government-owned passenger train service)
- Canadian National Railway Police
- Canadian Northern Railway Police
- Canadian Pacific Kansas City Police Service

== Oceania ==
=== Australia ===
==== Federal ====
- Australian Federal Police (AFP) (includes ACT Police)
- Australian Border Force (ABF)
- Australian Crime Commission (ACC) (ex. National Crime Authority)
- Australian Government Attorney General's Department
  - Director of Public Prosecutions
- Australian Securities and Investments Commission (ASIC)
- Australian Security Intelligence Organisation (ASIO) (domestic intelligence)

==== Service Police ====
- Royal Australian Corps of Military Police
- Naval Police Coxswain
- Air Force Police
- Australian Defence Force Investigative Service

==== State ====
- New South Wales Police Force
- Northern Territory Police
- Office of the Sheriff of New South Wales
- Queensland Police Service
- RailCorp Transit Officer
- South Australia Police
- Tasmania Police
- Victoria Police
- Western Australia Police
- Crime and Corruption Commission, Western Australia
- Crime and Misconduct Commission, Queensland
- Independent Commission Against Corruption, New South Wales
- New South Wales Crime Commission
- New South Wales Police Integrity Commission
- Office of Police Integrity, Victoria
- Local Government Council Ranger

=== Fiji ===
- Fiji Police

=== Kiribati ===
- Kiribati Police Force

=== Marshall Islands ===
- Marshall Islands National Police

=== Federated States of Micronesia ===
- Federated States of Micronesia National Police

=== Nauru ===
- Nauru Police Force

=== New Zealand ===
- New Zealand Police
  - Armed Offenders Squad
  - Diplomatic Protection Service
  - Organised Crime Agency
    - Serious Fraud Office
  - Royal New Zealand Police College
  - Special Tactics Group
- New Zealand Security Intelligence Service
  - Government Communications Security Bureau
- New Zealand Customs Service
- New Zealand Department of Corrections
- Ministry of Agriculture and Forestry
- Ministry of Fisheries
- Immigration New Zealand
- Military Police

=== Palau ===
- Palau National Police

=== Papua New Guinea ===
- Royal Papua New Guinea Constabulary

=== Pitcairn Islands ===
- Law enforcement in the Pitcairn Islands

=== Samoa ===
- Samoa Police Service

=== Solomon Islands ===
- Royal Solomon Islands Police Force

=== Tonga ===
- Tonga Police

=== Tuvalu ===
- Tuvalu Police Force

=== Vanuatu ===
- Vanuatu Police Force

== South America ==
=== Argentina ===
==== Federal ====
- Gendarmería Nacional Argentina (GNA) (Argentine National Gendarmerie)
- Prefectura Naval Argentina (PNA) (Argentine Naval Prefecture)
- Policía de Seguridad Aeroportuaria (PSA) (Airport Security Police)
- Policía Federal Argentina (PFA) (Argentine Federal Police)
- Servicio Penitenciario Federal (SPF) (Federal Penitentiary Service)
- Oficina Anticorrupción (OA) (Counter Corruption Bureau)
- Agencia Federal de Inteligencia (AFI) (Federal Intelligence Agency)

==== Armed Forces of Argentina ====
- Military Police
- Naval Infrastructure Police

==== Provincial ====
Each one of Argentina's twenty-three provinces has its own Provincial Police force.

- Buenos Aires Provincial Police (Policía Bonaerense)
- Santa Fe Provincial Police (Policía de la Provincia de Santa Fe)
- Córdoba Provincial Police (Policía de la Provincia de Córdoba)
- Tucumán Provincial Police (Policía de la Provincia de Tucumán)
- Chaco Provincial Police (Policia de la Provincia del Chaco)
- San Juan Provincial Police (Policia de la Provincia de San Juan)
- San Luis Provincial Police (Policia de la Provincia de San Luis)
- Formosa Provincial Police (Policia de la Provincia de Formosa)
- Neuquén Provincial Police (Policia de la Provincia de Neuquén)
- Chubut Provincial Police (Policia de la Provincia de Chubut)
- Santa Cruz Provincial Police (Policia de la Provincia de Santa Cruz)
- Tierra del Fuego Provincial Police (Policia de la Provincia de Tieraa del Fuego)
- Rio Negro Provincial Police (Policia de la Provincia de Río Negro)
- La Pampa Provincial Police (Policia de la Provincia de la Pampa)
- Catamarca Provincial Police (Policia de la Provincia de Catamarca)
- Santiago del Estero Provincial Police (Policia de la Provincia de Santiago del Estero)
- Salta Provincial Police (Policia de la Provincia de Salta)
- Jujuy Provincial Police (Policia de la Provincia de Jujuy)
- Misiones Provincial Police (Policia de la Provincia de Misiones)
- La Rioja Provincial Police (Policia de la Provincia de La Rioja)
- Entre Ríos Provincial Police (Policia de la Provincia de Entre Ríos)
- Corrientes Provincial Police (Policia de la Provincia de Corrientes)
- Mendoza Provincial Police (Policia de la Provincia de Mendoza)

==== Local ====
- Buenos Aires Metropolitan Police
- Buenos Aires City Police

=== Bolivia ===
- Bolivian Policia Nacional

=== Brazil ===
- Law enforcement in Brazil
- Brazilian Federal Police
- Brazilian Federal Highway Police
- Brazilian Military Police
- Brazilian Civil Police
- Brazilian Intelligence Agency
- Municipal Guards
- National Public Security Force

=== Chile ===
- Carabineros de Chile
- Policía de Investigaciones de Chile (PDI)
- Gendarmería de Chile

=== Colombia ===
- National Police of Colombia
  - Highway Police
  - Directorate of Criminal Investigation and Interpol (DIJIN)
  - Directorate of Carabineers and Rural Security
  - Fiscal and Customs Police
  - Mobile Anti-Disturbance Squadron
  - Mobile Carabinier Squadrons
- Cuerpo Tecnico de Investigacion (CTI)
- Migración Colombia

=== Ecuador ===
- National Police of Ecuador

=== Guyana ===
- Law enforcement in Guyana

=== Panama ===
- Law enforcement in Panama

=== Paraguay ===
- Law enforcement in Paraguay

=== Peru ===
- Policia Nacional del Peru

=== Suriname ===
- Law enforcement in Suriname

=== Uruguay ===
- Law enforcement in Uruguay

=== Venezuela ===
- Law enforcement in Venezuela
- Bolivarian Intelligence Service
- Policía Nacional Bolivariana

== Disbanded agencies ==
Note: Many of these fall under the definition of secret police and derive from that list.

=== Austria ===
- B-Gendarmerie (paramilitary security force from ca. 1950 until 1955)
- Bundesgendarmerie (Federal Constabulary until 2005)

=== Costa Rica ===
- Guardia Civil

=== Czechoslovakia ===
- Veřejná bezpečnost (Public security)
- StB (State Security)

=== Germany ===
Federal Republic of Germany

- Bundesgrenzschutz (BGS) (Federal Border Guard until 2005)
- Freiwillige Polizei-Reserve (FPR) (Voluntary paramilitary special police of the state of Berlin until 2002)

East Germany

- Volkspolizei (VoPo) (People's Police)
- Ministerium für Staatssicherheit (StaSi) (Ministry for State Security)
- Grenztruppen der DDR (Border Troops of East Germany)

Nazi Germany

- Police forces of Nazi Germany
- Ordnungspolizei (OrPo) (Order Police)
- Kriminalpolizei (KriPo) (Criminal Police)
- Sicherheitspolizei (SiPo) (Security Police)
- Geheime Staatspolizei (Gestapo) (Secret State Police)
- Zollgrenzschutz (ZGS) (Customs Border Guards)
- Feldgendarmerie (Field Military Police)
- Feldjägerkorps (Field Police Corps)
- Wehrmachtstreifendienst (Army's Patrol Service)
- Geheime Feldpolizei (GFP) (Secret Field Police)
- Reichssicherheitshauptamt (RSHA) (Reich Security Main Office)
- Reichssicherheitsdienst (RSD) (Reich Security Service)
- Sicherheitsdienst (SD) (Security Service)
- Feuerschutzpolizei (FSP) (Fire Protection Police)
- Bahnschutzpolizei (BSP) (Railway Protection Police)
- Luftschutzpolizei (LSP) (Air Raid Protection Police)
- Schutzpolizei (Schupo) (State Protection Police)
- Gemeindepolizei (GemPo) (Municipal Protection Police)
- Schutzmannschaft (SchuMa) (Protective Teams)
- Hilfspolizei (HiPo) (Auxiliary Police)
- Verwaltungspolizei (Administrative Police)

=== Fascist Italy ===
- Milizia Volontaria per la Sicurezza Nazionale (Voluntary Militia for National Security; Blackshirts) (MVSN)
- Guardia Nazionale Repubblicana (National Republican Guard)
- Corpo di Polizia Repubblicana (Republican Police Corps)
- Organizzazione per la Vigilanza e la Repressione dell'Antifascismo (OVRA) (Organisation for Vigilance and Repression of Anti-Fascism)
- Polizia dell'Africa Italiana (PAI) (Italian African Police)
- Guardia alla Frontiera (Border Guards)

=== Empire of Japan ===
- Police services of the Empire of Japan
- Kempeitai (Military Police Corps)
- Tokubetsu Keisatsutai (Naval Secret Police)
- Tokkō (Special Higher Police)

=== Panama Canal Zone ===
- Canal Zone Police

=== Second Polish Republic ===
- Policja Państwowa (State Police)

=== People's Republic of Poland ===
- Milicja Obywatelska (Citizens' Militia)
  - Zmotoryzowane Odwody Milicji Obywatelskiej (Motorized Reserves of the Citizens' Militia)
  - Ochotnicza Rezerwa Milicji Obywatelskiej (Volunteer Reserve Militia)
- Wojskowa Służba Wewnętrzna (Internal Military Service)
- Ministerstwo Bezpieczeństwa Publicznego (Ministry of Public Security)
- Służba Bezpieczeństwa MSW (Security Service of the Ministry of Internal Affairs)

=== Philippines ===
- Philippine Constabulary
  - Integrated National Police
- Philippine National Guard
- Civil Guard

=== Communist Romania ===
- Securitate

=== Former Soviet Union/Russia ===
- Soviet secret police
- KGB (Committee for State Security)
- Militsiya (Militia)
- Federal Tax Police Service of the Russian Federation
- Federal Migration Service
- Federal Narcotics Control Service
- Ministry of Police of the Russian Empire

=== South Vietnam ===
- Republic of Vietnam National Police

== See also ==
- Anti-corruption agency
- Auxiliary police
- Law enforcement by country
- List of intelligence agencies
- List of protective service agencies
- List of national border guard agencies
- List of gendarmeries
- List of historical secret police organizations
- List of special police units
- Vigilante
