= Carabinier (disambiguation) =

Carabinier originally a cavalry soldier armed with a carbine, may also refer to the following:

== Army ==
- 150th Battalion (Carabiniers Mont-Royal), CEF, was a unit in the Canadian Expeditionary Force during the First World War.
- 2nd Carabinier Regiment (France), was a French cavalry regiment.
- 3rd Carabiniers, a cavalry regiment of the British Army.
- Carabiniers (6th Dragoon Guards), was a cavalry regiment of the British Army.
- Carabiniers-à-Cheval, were mounted troops in the service of France.
- Compagnie des Carabiniers du Prince, is the Infantry division of the Force Publique of Monaco.
- Mobile Carabinier Squadrons, specialised units of the Colombian National Police, part of its Directorate of Carabineers and Rural Security (Dirección de Carabineros y Seguridad Rural or DICAR).
- Regiment Carabiniers Prins Boudewijn – Grenadiers, is an infantry regiment in the Land Component of the Belgian Armed Forces.

== Culture ==
- Carabinier, a traditional folk dance of Haiti.
- The Carabineers, French: Les Carabiniers, a French 1963 film and was the fifth narrative feature by French filmmaker Jean-Luc Godard.

== See also ==
- Carabiner, a safety device used in rock climbing.
- Carabinieri, is the national military police of Italy.
