= Colombian National Police Directorate for Citizens Security =

The Directorate for Citizens Security or Dirección de Seguridad Ciudadana is a branch of the Colombian National Police, currently led by Operative Director Brigadier General Luis Alberto Gómez, controls strategic police services in cities, metropolitan areas, police departments and decentralized units.. It was formerly known as the Direccion Operativa or Operations Directorate. The Directorate for Citizens Security is responsible for the general supervision of the 8 National Police regions

== Organization ==
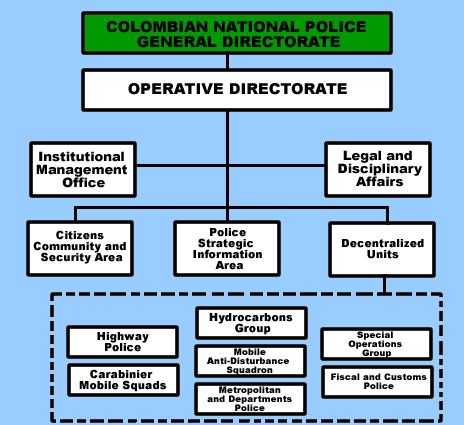
Colombian National Police Operative Directorate.

== Units under command ==
- Hydrocarbons Group
- Colombian National Police Special Operations Command
- Highway Police
- Mobile Anti-Disturbance Squadron
- Citizens Security
- Community Management

The Carabinier Mobile Squads have been moved to the Directorate of Carabineers and Rural Security
