= General Santander National Police Academy =

Police academy in Colombia

Coordinates: 4°35′25″N 74°07′49″W

Flag of the General Santander National Police Academy.

Coat of arms of the General Santander National Police Academy.

General Santander National Police Academy (Spanish: Escuela General Santander de la Policia Nacional) is the main educational center for the Colombian National Police. The academy functions as a university for the formation of its force.

== History ==
The institution was created by the Colombian National Police with the main function of instructing recruits to become officers, enlisted, agents, detectives and other technical and administrative services. It was formally restructured by the presidential Decree 343 of 21 February 1940 during the mandate of president Eduardo Santos in an effort to shape the institution into a more efficient entity with the support of Decree 776 of 14 April which set the dotation needed per personnel, unified and assigned more objective functions to the police force. Decree 343 also set Luis Andrés Gómez as the first director of the institution, who assigned the staff personnel for it, as also established in the Decree 77610. One of his main purposes was to achieve a status of university for the Colombian policemen.

The institution initially offered four courses with the requirement of having a previous intellectual preparation, professional attitude, moral attitude and the vocation to become a policeman. Gómez also initiates a selection process to hire highly prepared Professors from the Law Faculty of the National University of Colombia, selecting Copete Lizarralde, Arturo Valencia Zea, Adolfo Vélez Echeverri, Augusto Sastre, Alfonso Ruiz Ojeda, Moisés Spath Nerel, Guillermo Meléndez Ramírez, José Alejandro Mantilla and Guillermo Fernández. Luis Alberto Pinzón directed the Studies Prefecture along with Ricardo Rodríguez Aranza, Francisco Bruno, Miguel Lleras Pizarro, Roberto Pineda Castillo, Ernesto Antolínez, José Manuel Mosquera, Enrique Vargas and Jorge Valencia. The first class was named Simon Bolivar in honor of El Libertador. Emiliano Camargo Rodríguez was assigned as the class commander and Luis A. Cárdenas and Rey Prato as section commanders.

The courses focused on instruction on civility, Colombian geography, Colombian constitution, Police code, Penal code and proceedings, typing, topography, Forensics, organisation and documentation, leadership school, military doctrine, Equestrianism and Hippology.

With the Decree 421 of 28 February, the Alumni Department is organized and assigned to the General Santander National Police Academy with the mission of forming professional National Police functionaries in its different areas, everything ruled by the Alumni Council.

Decree 1187 of 15 May established National Police ranks for detectives, in an ascendant order and depending on time in rank. Fourth Class detectives, 2 years in rank; Third Class detectives, 3 years in rank; Second Class detectives, 4 years in rank; First Class Detectives and Detective in Chief with an additional requirement of a major in law or previously been an Instructional Judge. Non-commissioned officers and sub-lieutenants were allowed as Fourth Class detectives if they reached the condition needed of being younger than 35 years old. By this same time a Detective Promotions board was established and conformed by the Director of the National Police, the Secretary of the National Police, the Director of the National Department of Security, the Director of the General Santander Academy and the Personnel Department Chief. These detectives were sorted internally into different promotional categories taking in consideration the time in grade, professional aptitudes, instruction and conduct observed in the institution.

On 5 August 1938, President Alfonso López Pumarejo officially inaugurates the General Santander National Police Academy Buildings. In 1939 the Alumni Department is created to lead the preparation, formation and education of the National Police regular personnel and improve administrative and technical services. By Decree 343 of 21 February 1940 the Academy is finally organized.

Since the Colombian National Ministry of Education approved the academic programs of "Police Studies" and "Police Administration" by resolution Number 9354 of 25 October 1976 the Academy is authorized to operate as a Higher Education Institution. Initially the Police Administrator formation was designed to go through a system of cycles lasting 20 weeks each. By the end of the fourth cycle the recruit changed of status, from cadet to sub-lieutenant (aka alférez) rank that would be held for 40 weeks more in order to receive the grade of "Police Administrator technician", then return to classes and go through the last three cycles in order to receive the title of "Professional Police Administrator" and receive further promotion to advanced rank grades; captain, major, etc.

The Academy always considers three fields for formation in its plan of study; professional, scientific/investigative and humane/social. Each field divided into subfields and subjects in order to achieve a speciality knowledge. by mandate of the Colombian Institute for the Promotion of Higher Education (ICFES) in resolution 1721 of 1982 the academy's license remains effective until 1987. By resolution 0161 of January 26 the National Police Directorate approves a new "Study Plan" which includes a renovated University formation program featuring an extension to the length of formation time to total an entire year.

By 1991 the Academy begins and develops the Police "professionalization". By resolution 02891 of October 2, 1991, The ICFES approves a reform to the "Study Plan" to change the name of "Police Studies Technology" into "Criminalistics and Police Technology", plan that would last until 11 September 1997 when by resolution 02668, the Colombian Ministry of Defense and the National Police Directorate approve a new "Study Plan" that remains in effect. The new "Study Plan" program lasts for three years and it is distributed into six academic semesters. It contains two indoctrine fields: Police fundamentals and the complementary, this last one subdivided into legal, administrative and investigative areas.

The current curriculum is focused on improving essentially the professional police indoctrination on human rights, ethical and legal principles focused on civil liberties and warranties for Colombian citizens. By resolution 2252 of 17 August 2000 the Academy was authorized to credit the Criminalistic (Forensic Sciences) Program.

== Organization ==
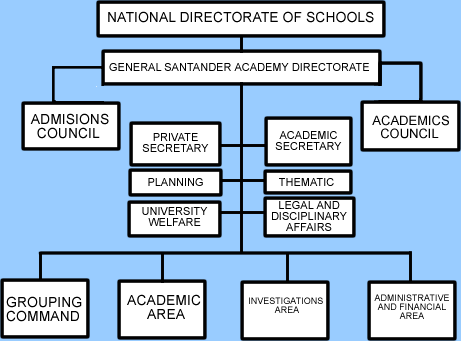
General Santander National Police Academy organisational chart

=== Faculties ===
The General Santander Academy is divided into four faculties:

==== Police Administration Faculty ====
Its mission is to develop undergraduate and graduate programs to form ideal and efficient professional policemen that can effectively contribute to the benefit of the community.

The faculty is subdivided into four advising groups:

1. The Continuing Education Center: its main objective is to improve educational and labor quality through policies and administrative capacitation processes in accordance with the Institutional Capacitation Plan. This group also seeks academic exchanges with other institutions and plans, executes, follows up and evaluates the different academic events.
2. The Pedagogic Management Group: Created in 2004 with the main purpose of support the academic processes related to capacitation and formation of students. This team is formed by professional knowledge in police fields, administration, evaluation and pedagogy.
3. Evaluation and Quality Center: In 2005 two entities, the Accreditation and Statistics Offices to create the Evaluation and Quality Center operating from the Academic Vice-Principal Office in the National Directorate of Academies. Its approval is currently pending. Its mission will be to administer and develop the measuring and evaluating proceedings through objective and reliable statistics that would allow a compilation, evaluation and projection of the variable behaviours that conform the police educational system with the intention of recommending actions that would facilitate improvement plans and educational vision.
4. Research and Technological Development Center: This group was created in 2004 as a group with certain autonomy from the Academic Vice-Principal Office of the National Directorate of Academies and subdivided into two groups: Institutional Research and the Spreading and Follow Up. Its mission is to lead and promote research and development in the undergraduate and graduate programs, institutional and academic research of uniformed and non-uniformed personnel and the Academy's Alumni.

==== Criminal Investigation Faculty ====
Seal of the Criminal Investigation Faculty.

This Faculty began activities in June 1988 with a class of 30 junior officers. Its main purpose is to develop programs in undergraduate, graduate and further studies in Criminal Investigation, Forensics and Judicial Police. This faculty has an undergraduate program on Criminal Investigation and four specialisations

1. Criminal Investigation Specialisation: the main purpose of this course is to educate students in the scientific, technical, legal and human fields of the Criminal Investigation by developing research processes with emphasis for Professionals in Law, Administration, Medicine, Humanities, Chemistry and Biology.
2. Traffic Accident Investigations Specialty: with an emphasis on specializing agents in the field of traffic accidents through the reconstruction of events using scientific and technical resources.
3. Criminalistic Technologies: The purpose of this faculty is to educate students in technologies needed to solve criminal affairs and bring probatory outcomes and support for the different judicial organisms, also to coordinate different field processes in criminal investigations areas.
4. Adversarial system, Judicial Police and Criminalistic Courses: Its main purpose is to instruct non-policemen and policemen students in the Adversarial system being introduced into the Colombian Judicial System along with the already established inquisitorial system, and also in Judicial Police and Criminalistics as required by the democratic security.

==== Technical and Technological Studies Faculty ====
This Faculty offers six subfields:

1. Professional Police Service Technician: Mainly intended for Bachelor Policemen who want to join the active regular police force in the executive ranks. The course functions as a "basic training" mostly covering police servility tasks. The course lasts 9 semesters and one year of practice in theJudicial Police.
2. Police Studies in Technology: The main objective of this course is to identify different technological tools and apply them to police activities.
3. Road Security Professional Technician: The objective of this course is to instruct policemen on Highway and street patrols actions, proceedings and activities to maintain vehicular traffic order.
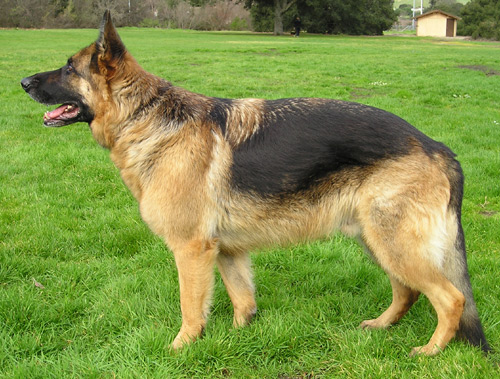
4. Police Canine Guiding and Training: this course endures a year of training on raising canines in their development, education, training, procreation and welfare. Officers trained in this course will be able to technically assist in development and instruction for national, international Canine Training Schools and other organisations. Within the functions of the police canine are officers support, narcotics and explosives detection, search and rescue, trailing and intervention.
5. Police Air Pilots Formation: this course trains officers in piloting the Colombian National Police aircraft which include medium and small planes and helicopters. a period of ten months
6. Aeronautical Technician Formation: this course trains police non-commissioned officers, police executives and agents personnel in maintenance and repair of the National Police Aircraft.

==== Specialties Faculty ====
This faculty crosstrains with most of the other faculties, mostly with the Police Air Pilots Formation, Aeronautical Technician Formation and Road Security Professional Technician, and others, but also studies subjects more in depth to achieve specialties like the Judicial Police School which contains different programs in Documentology, Dactyloscopy, Judicial Photography, Ballistics, Explosives, Planimetry, Vehicle identification and judicial police. Personnel from the National Police, Departamento Administrativo de Seguridad or Administrative Department of Security (DAS), Attorney General of Colombia and its unit Cuerpo Técnico de Investigación (CTI).

=== Strategic alliances ===
The General Santander Academy holds strategic alliances primarily with the United States agencies Federal Bureau of Investigation (FBI) and the Drug Enforcement Administration (DEA) due to the recent war on drugs and the implementation of the Plan Colombia which has become part of the war on terror and because of its experience on these it has become as one of the most apt educational centers for law enforcement in Latin America.

Other countries also hold exchange programs with the Academy, most of them from Latin America; Bolivia, Chile, Costa Rica, Ecuador, El Salvador, Guatemala, Honduras, Panama, Peru and Venezuela. From Europe only Spain maintains an exchange program through the Complutense University of Madrid.

== See also ==
- Colombian National Police
