= Rosso José Serrano =

Colombian ex-law enforcement officer and politician

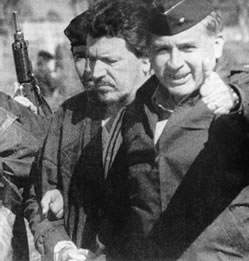
- Then General of the Colombian National Police, Rosso José Serrano personally escorts arrested Cali Cartel drug lord Miguel Rodríguez Orejuela.
- Born: Rosso José Serrano Cadena; 30 August 1942 (age 84); Vélez, Santander
- Education: General Santander Police Cadet School
- Known for: Policeman
- Police career
- Department: Colombian National Police
- Service years: 1960–2000
- Rank: Lieutenant General

Rosso José Serrano Cadena (August 30, 1942) is a former General of the Colombian National Police from 1994 to 2000 during Ernesto Samper's presidency and was one of the masterminds behind the dismantling of the Cali Cartel and Medellín Cartel. Serrano received numerous national and international decorations for his work against illicit drugs, drug-trafficking and the restructuring of the Colombian Police. He was also formerly a diplomat in Austria.

== Early years ==
Born in Vélez, Santander, Serrano joined the Colombian National Police in 1960, attended classes in the "General Santander Police Academy" graduating in Police Administration and also received a doctorate in law and political sciences from La Gran Colombia University.

== Public image and recognition ==
Serrano was described with words like "hero" in international media outlets. The American Congressman Bob Barr called him a "true hero in the War on Drugs". Serrano was twice chosen as the World's Top Cop by the International Association of Police Chiefs.

The Los Angeles Times wrote in 2000:

Serrano’s ability to anticipate change and respond has allowed him to survive four defense ministers and two presidents during his more than five years as police director. That’s impressive for a kid from the little town of Velez who admits that he joined the police at age 17 because he liked the uniform. “Serrano is more than a great policeman,” said Myles Frechette, former U.S. ambassador to Colombia.

== Parapolitics Scandal ==
On May 16, 2007 in a court hearing in Medellín, former paramilitary warlord and commander of the United Self-Defense Forces of Colombia (AUC) Salvatore Mancuso declared that the former director in chief of the Colombian National Police and current ambassador of Colombia to Austria Rosso José Serrano had intervened on behalf of the AUC leaders captured in La Guajira Department which included Rodrigo Tovar Pupo (aka "Jorge 40").

== Popular culture ==
- In TV Series El cartel is portrayed by the colombian actor Germán Quintero as the character of Javier Ibarra.
- In the American crime thriller drama Narcos he is portrayed by the actor Gaston Velandia.
