= Diego Fernando Ramírez =

Colombian murderer and suspected serial killer

- Born: Diego Fernando Ramírez Hernández
- Other name: "The Butcher of Buga"

Details
- Victims: 2–8+
- Span of crimes: 2006 – 2007 (suspected)
- Country: Colombia
- State: Valle del Cauca
- Date apprehended: March 6, 2007

Diego Fernando Ramírez Hernández (place and date of birth unknown) is a former Colombian cattle rancher, murderer and suspected serial killer. The authorities, who've investigated the mysterious disappearances of people in the town of Buga, believe that Ramírez has carried out several killings following the same pattern and modus operandi.

Nicknamed The Butcher of Buga, Ramírez was directly tied to two murders, with the bodies of his victims located in a one a half meters mass grave in his own home. He is suspected of at least 6 similar murders.

== Murders ==
During the time of the murders, Ramírez worked at a butcher shop in the town of Buga. It is believed that one of his victims was a vet named Evangelista Cruz Reyes, whom he had met when the doctor was called to vaccinate some pigs on his property. After this encounter, both parties agreed to meet again on January 2, 2007, at Ramírez's property for him to return the money, but Cruz Reyes was never heard from again.

In December 2006, Ramírez proposed a business deal to Gonzalo Díaz Gómez, a renowned rancher from the city of Cali, selling him 60 pigs at the cost of $10,000,000 pesos. Díaz Gómez accepted the deal and offered an advance payment of $5,000,000 pesos, but Ramírez never gave him his property. Due to this, he summoned the rancher to return the money since, according to him, the business wasn't prospering due to a series of inconveniences. On January 5, 2007, they met at a path known as La Palomera, very close to the Cauca River. On that day, Díaz Gómez, who was carrying large sums of money with him, disappeared.

The bodies of both men were later found by authorities on the Ramírez estate, buried in a mass grave more than a meter deep.

Faced with these crimes and other similar disappearances in Buga at the time of the murders, the CTI, a specialized body of the Office of the Attorney General of Colombia, investigated the cases of 6 other persons who were directly related to Ramírez, since they all had had contact with the murderer. Of these, two hotel businessmen (Luis Ángel Rodríguez and Ana Lucía Calderón) were seen talking with him. The conclusion drawn by the authorities is that in most cases, large sums of money were involved.

== See also ==
- List of serial killers by country
