= Jorge Daniel Castro =

Jorge Daniel Castro Castro (born 1950 in Mocoa, Putumayo) is a Colombian former General of the Colombian National Police and business administrator graduated from the Cooperative University and the Inter-American Defense College. Castro served in the National Police for 38 years and worked in many National Police post around Colombia, including Bolívar, Tolima, Quindío, Nariño, Magdalena and Risaralda, and San Andres Island, .

He was Department Police Commander in Amazonas, Caldas, Santander and the Metropolitan Area of Medellín this last one for nine months. On September 3, 2002, Castro was then assigned commander of the Metropolitan Area of Bogotá and on November 12, 2003, he became General Director of the National Police.

== Wire tapping scandal ==
Castro was forced into early retirement after a wire tapping scandal. Subordinates of Castro performed unauthorized wiretapping on members of the opposition party, journalists, members of the government and people related to the Parapolitica scandal. Teodoro Campo and other generales in his direct line of succession were also forced into early retirement. Castro was also one of Colombian President Álvaro Uribe's closest allies.
