= Colombian National Police Special Operations Command =

Rapid reaction force

Seal of the Special Operations Command

Colombian National Police Special Operations Command (Spanish: Comando de Operaciones Especiales, COPES) is a subdivision of the Colombian National Police under the Directorate for Citizens Security. This Special Operations unit functions as a Quick reaction force (QRF) for Police operations and as a permanent training field for personnel.

== History ==
Founded in 1984 with the main purpose of having a highly trained, capable and equipped group for quick reaction to high risk or crisis situations. Officers in the grade of lieutenants and captains in the Colombian National Police were selected to receive training in Europe and the United States. Its first operation was in 1986 during the Palace of Justice siege, taken over by the M-19 guerrilla. The Urban Interdiction Group (Grupo de Interdiccion Urbano) was heavily trained in urban assault techniques. This unit also became part of operations involving the war on drugs against the Colombian drug cartels like the Medellín Cartel between 1989 and 1994 and the Cali Cartel between 1996 and 1999 with very positive outcomes. The Special Operations Command constantly improves techniques and equipment in order to maintain an advantage over possible criminal actions against civilians and infrastructure.

== Functions ==
- Support Police Units needs that imply high risks tasks.
- Instruct special operations classes to different Police units, Military units or any other international or national organization requiring it.
- Serve as an advising organization to the Operative Directorate of the Colombian National Police on issues regarding insurgency and organized crime. It also advises the Administrative Directorate of the Colombian National Police on Armament and Equipment.

== Organization ==
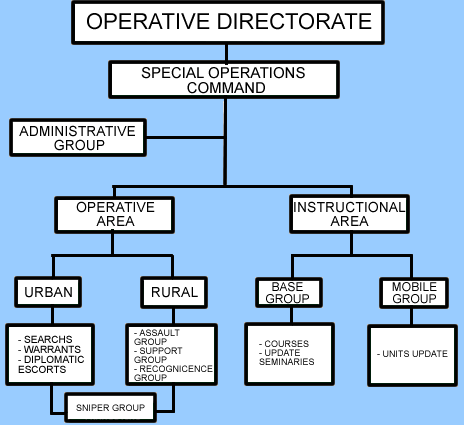
Colombian National Police Special Operations Command organizational chart.
