= Mobile Carabinier Squadrons =

Specialized unit of the Colombian National Police

Emblem of the Mobile Carabinier Squadrons

The Mobile Carabinier Squadrons (Escuadrones Móviles de Carabineros in Spanish) (EMCAR) are specialised units of the Colombian National Police, part of its Directorate of Carabineers and Rural Security (Dirección de Carabineros y Seguridad Rural or DICAR). The mission of these mobile squadrons is to provide highway security, control traffic and prevent accidents. Among their objectives is to interact and socialize with civilians to create neighborhood watch and collaboration.

== History ==
Implemented during the presidency of Álvaro Uribe Vélez (2002 - 2010), this unit was intended to support the democratic security plan, whose main objective was to restore order and establish police presence in lawless towns and rural areas. They were a special rural police force that carried out counterinsurgency missions, frequently in conjunction with army units. Headquartered at the department and national territory capitals, the Carabineros were maintained in squadrons that were separate from those of the regular police; they wore distinctive uniforms and often traveled as mounted and/or motorized units.

== Unit organization ==
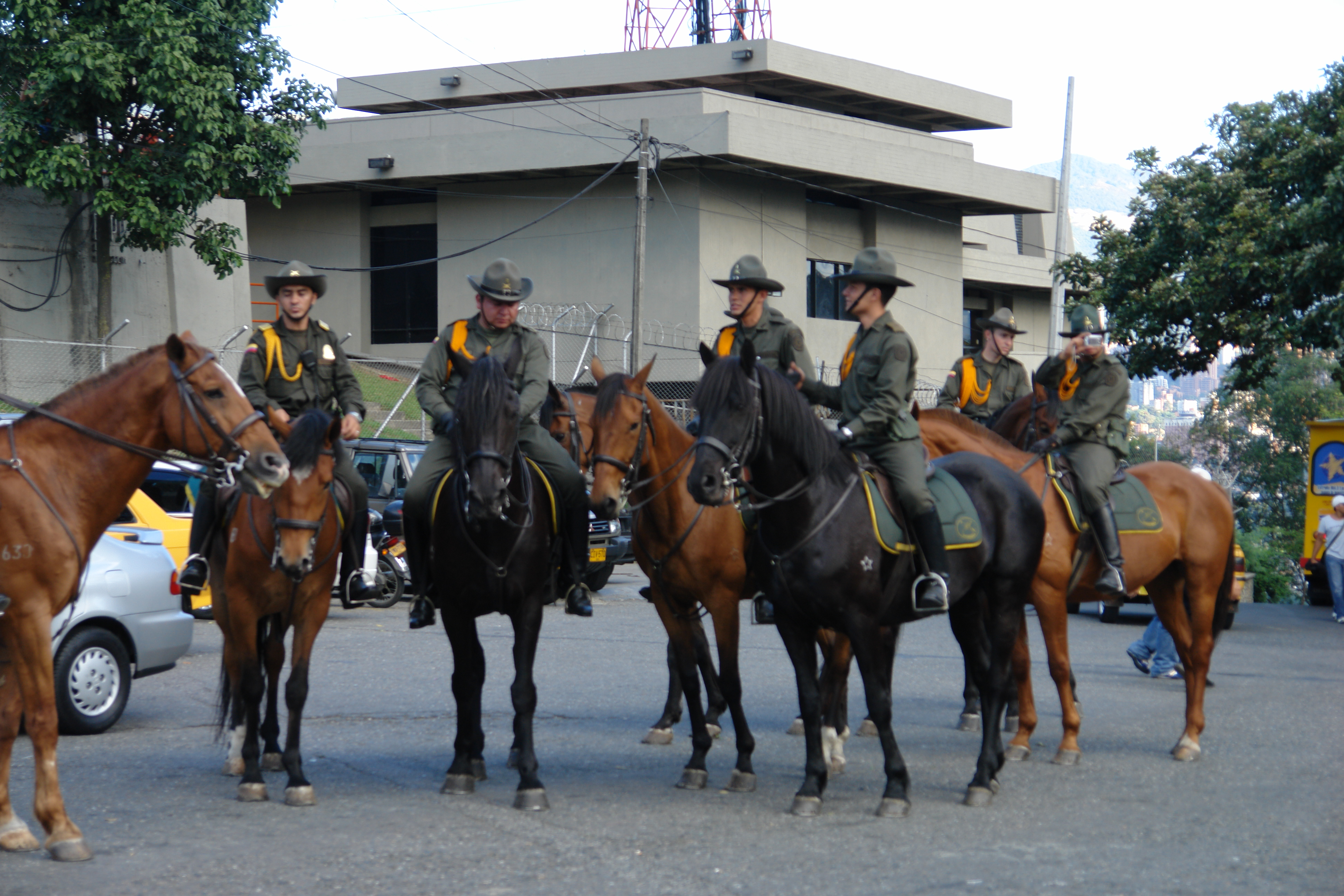
Mounted Carabineros in Medellín.

The EMCAR were initially organized into 62 Mobile Squadrons of 150 Carabiniers each between 2002 and 2006.

Each Carabinier Mobile Squadron is usually composed of four National Police Officers, 12 non-commissioned officers and 134 patrolmen or agents.
