= Bachelor Police =

The Bachelor Police (Spanish: Policias Bachilleres) is an auxiliary or police support organisation in the Colombian National Police, consisting of adolescents and young adults over 18 years old and/or those who have completed their high school leaving certificate and need to complete their obligatory military service.

According to the Constitutional Law 48 of March 3, 1993, which controls recruitment and mobilisation in the military forces of Colombia, potential recruits have the option of completing their obligatory military service after graduating from high school and/or achieving legal age. This may be in the Colombian National Police for 12 months instead of the serving in the Colombian Armed Forces. "Bachelor Policemen" do not carry firearms but wear basic National Police uniform without insignias, usually supporting the regular police in surveillance and traffic duties with whistles, two-way radios, bicycles and batons.

== See also ==
- Colombian National Police
