= Carabinier =

Type of light cavalry armed with a carbine

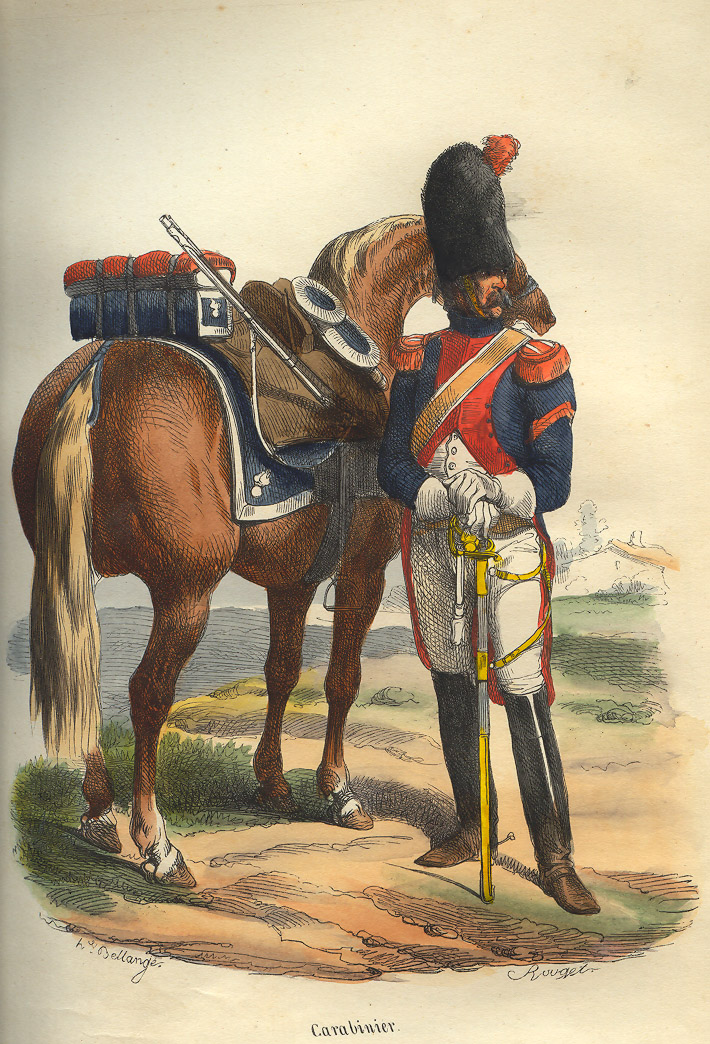
Napoleonic French Carabinier, 1810

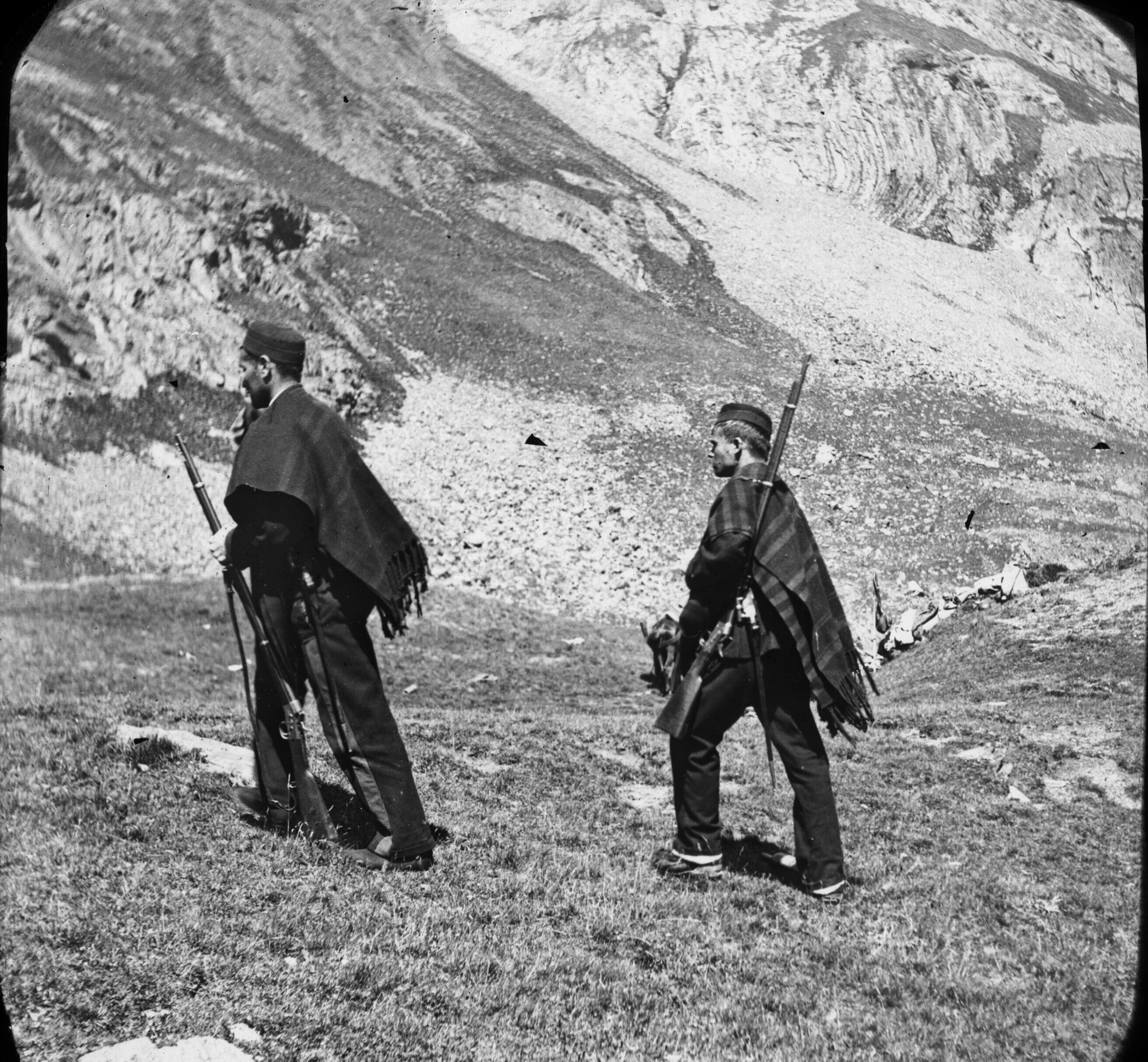
Spanish Carabiniers in the Pyrenees, 1892.

A carabinier (also sometimes spelled carabineer or carbineer) is in principle a soldier armed with a carbine, musket, or rifle, which became commonplace by the beginning of the Napoleonic Wars in Europe. The word is derived from the identical French word carabinier.

Historically, carabiniers were generally (but not always) horse soldiers. The carbine was considered a more appropriate firearm for a horseman than a full-length musket, since it was shorter in length, weighed less, and was easier to manipulate on horseback. Light infantry sometimes carried carbines because they are less encumbering when moving rapidly, especially through vegetation, but in most armies the tendency was to equip light infantry with longer-range weapons such as rifles rather than shorter-range weapons such as carbines. In Italy and Spain, carbines were considered suitable equipment for soldiers with policing roles, so the term carabinier evolved to sometimes denote gendarmes and border guards.

Today, the term is used by some countries in military, law enforcement, and gendarmerie roles.

== Background ==
Carabiniers differed from army to army and over time, but typically were medium cavalry, similar in armament and tactical role to dragoons.

Napoleon inherited two French carabinier regiments of heavy cavalry (the two most senior cavalry regiments in the army), which gained some prestige in his wars. In 1810, French Carabiniers were equipped like cuirassiers, with helmets and cuirasses (though these were of brass and brass-skinned iron), and they were no longer issued carbines. The French army has no carabinier regiments today. The British army raised regiments of carabiniers in the late 17th century. The descendants of one such regiment survived as the 3rd Carabiniers (Prince of Wales's Dragoon Guards) until 1971, when it was amalgamated with the Royal Scots Greys. Accordingly, no regiment bears the title today, although the Royal Scots Dragoon Guards are sub-titled "Carabiniers and Greys".

Italy has a famous force of carabiniers, a gendarmerie known by the Italian name Carabinieri. Chile also has a force of gendarme carabiniers, the Carabineros de Chile, and the National Police of Colombia has mobile road-based units called Mobile Carabinier Squadrons. The Belgian Land Component includes a Regiment des Carabiniers, which saw service against the German invaders in August 1914 still dressed in its 19th century uniform complete with a form of top hat. The Spanish Army formerly maintained a corps of Carabineros who served as frontier guards. This force was, however, disbanded following the Spanish Civil War of 1936–1939 and replaced by units of the Civil Guard.

== Infantry Carabiniers ==
The use of carabinier to refer to infantry troops comes from the French light infantry battalions of 1794, where it denoted troops of the elite company known as grenadiers in line infantry.

Other infantry units with the title of carabiniers included:

- The military of Monaco includes an infantry unit called the Compagnie des Carabiniers du Prince, which has been active since at least 1817.
- In the Imperial Russian Army during the Napoleonic Wars, the sections on the right flank of yeger battalions deployed in line were called carabiniers.
  - Quite apart from the elite yeger platoons, foot carabinier regiments existed for a brief time after 12 February 1816 when the six grenadier-yeger Regiments were renamed as carabiniers. These included the oldest regular infantry regiment in the Russian Army, the Yerivan Leib-Grenadier regiment as the former 7th Carabinier Regiment. Foot Carabinier regiments were renamed rifles (Russian: стрелки) in 1857 following the Crimean War.
- Bavarian Volunteer Jäger Corps in 1813

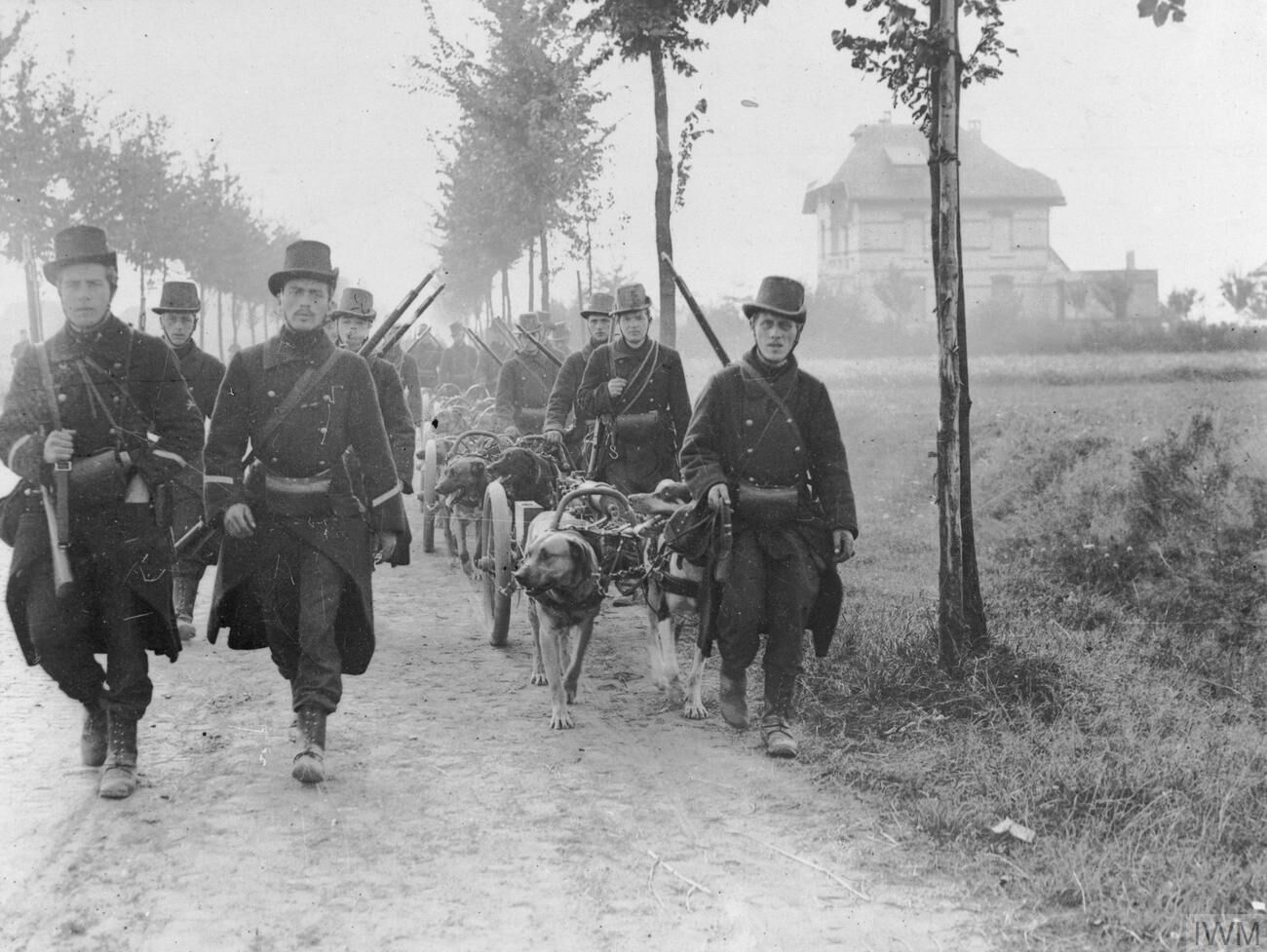
Belgian Carabiniers with dog drawn machine gun carts during the Battle of the Frontiers in 1914

- The Belgian Chasseurs included an infantry Regiment des Carabiniers, which saw service against the German Army in August 1914 still dressed in its 19th century uniform complete with a form of top hat. Following a merger in 1992, the unit became the Regiment Carabiniers Prins Boudewijn – Grenadiers.
- Waldeck, Lippe-Detmold, Shaumburg-Lippe contingents in the 2nd battalion, 6th Rheinbund Regiment of the Confederation of the Rhine.
- Nassau 2nd Light Infantry Regiment
- Legion Irlandaise (Irish Legion) in French service
- Westphalian voltigeurs-carabiniers created by Jérôme Bonaparte, and after 1811 renamed Jäger Carabinier d'Elite
- Papal States Carabinieri indigeni formed from Italian recruits, and Carabinieri esteri formed from foreign recruits
- Kingdom of Italy under Viceroy Eugène de Beauharnais (1805–1814) had Velites Carabiniers of the Guard.
- One of the three light infantry battalions of the reorganised Royal Spanish Army in 1812 was called Carabiniers.

== Mounted Carabiniers ==
=== Royal Spanish carabineros ===
Although the Spanish Crown was the first to raise carbine armed cavalry regiments, the Spanish Army is not known for its cavalry carabiniers. The la Brigada de Carabineros Reales, though dressed as hussars, did however participate in several of Spain's wars, including the Peninsular War against Napoleon (part of the Napoleonic Wars), where they distinguished themselves at Sepúlveda (28 November 1808), along with the Alcántara and Montesa cavalry regiments, against Lasalle's French 10th Chasseurs à cheval and 9th Dragoons. One notable officer serving with the brigade was Carlos María de Alvear. The regiment, along with the cavalry of the Spanish Royal Guard, was reformed at Valladolid by General Gregorio García de la Cuesta by which time they were numbered scarcely more than a squadron, and were given the pick of some 5,000 volunteers. They later participated in the Carlist Wars, notably at Bilbao. See also the separate section on the frontier guard Carabineros of the Spanish Army below.

=== French Carabiniers-à-Cheval ===
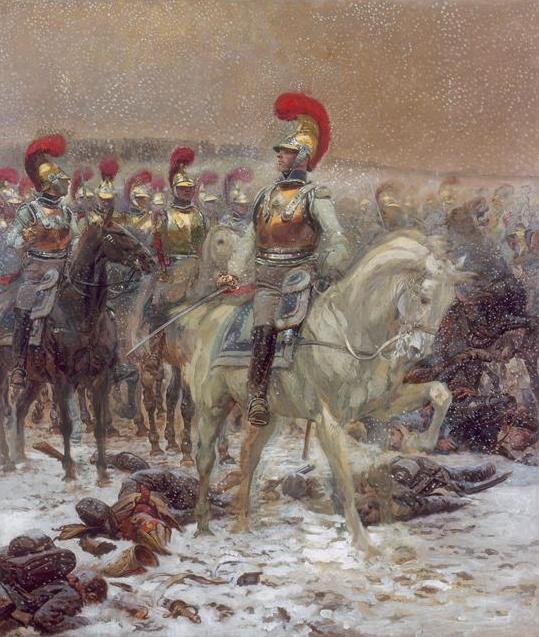
French carabiniers of 1812

In 1690, one company of carabiniers was maintained in each regiment of the French army's cavalry. Their duties were analogous to those of grenadiers in infantry regiments: scouting, detached work, and, in general, all duties requiring special activity and address. They fought mounted and dismounted alike, and even took part in siege warfare in the trenches. The French carabiniers were mentioned at the battle of Neerwinden in 1693 commanded by Prince de Conti. Although their original role was that of a mounted police similar to the Gendarmes, as combat troops they first took the form of separate companies within each cavalry regiments on 29 October 1691 under Louis XIV. Only later was an independent regiment or cavalerie de reserve established in 1693 under the command of Duc du Maine. However at that time all French cavalry other than the gendarmes were called light cavalry, and their first name was Corps royal des carabiniers, organised by brigading of four squadrons commanded by a lieutenant-colonel.

The Corps was enlarged to ten squadrons by the start of the Seven Years' War. Their depot was in Strasbourg, where it remained for a century. On 13 May 1758, the Corps was renamed Royal carabiniers de monsieur le Comte de Provence. By 1762, the Corps was enlarged to five brigades of thirty squadrons, but was reduced to two regiments in 1788. However, the events of the French Revolution affected all of the French Army and the cavalry Arm in particular, and the carabiniers were reduced to two regiments of four squadrons each, later serving in the Army of the Rhine. The regiments retained their distinctive bearskin headwear until 1810 when it was replaced by even more distinctive helmets with scarlet combs. They were also distinguished by Napoleon with a brass overlay on the iron cuirasses after suffering heavy casualties in the 1809 campaign, but were no longer equipped with carbines.

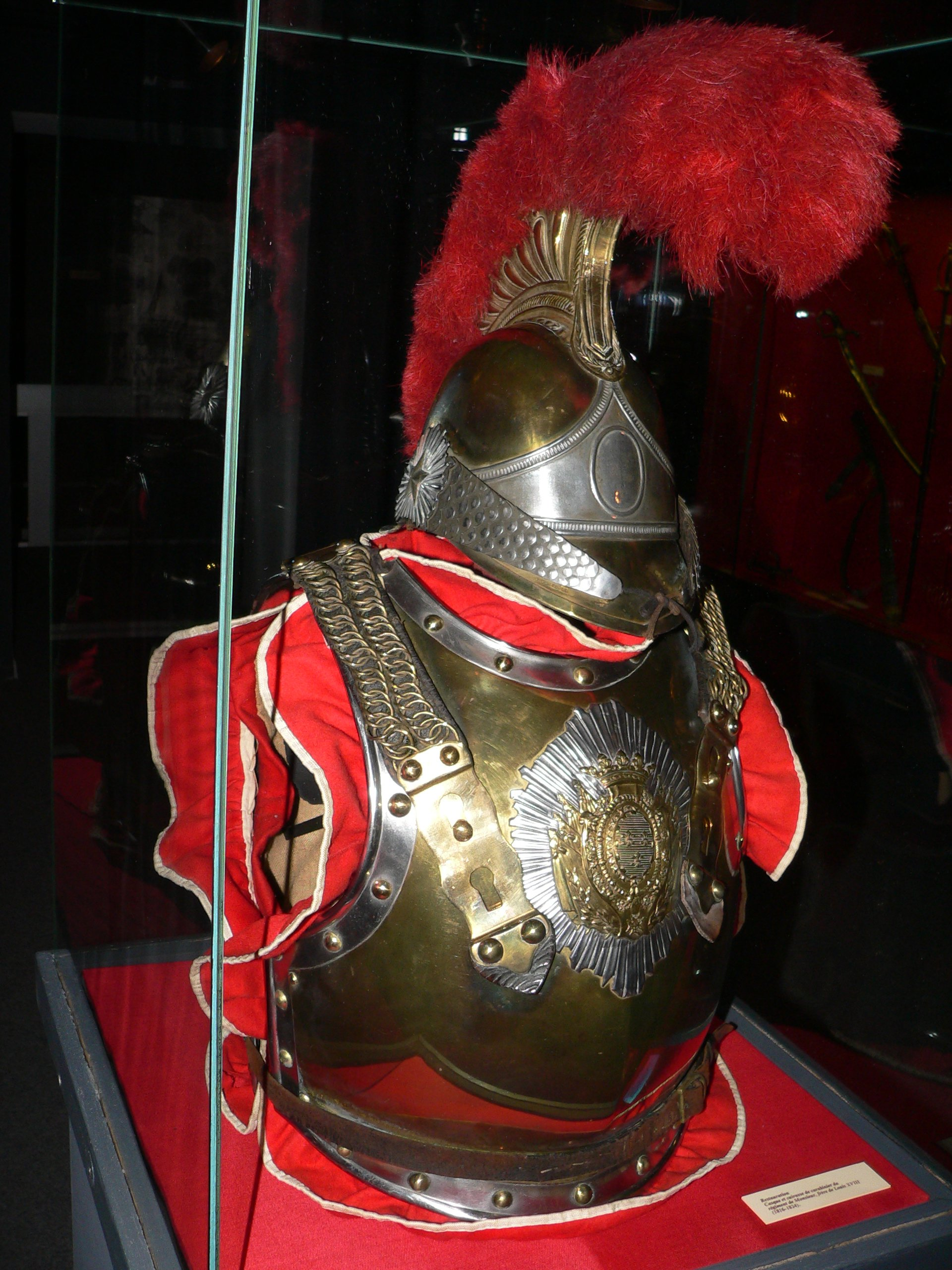
Cuirass and helmet of the French Horse Carabinier, during the Bourbon Restoration (1816–1824).

The two Carabiniers regiments, brigaded together and as a part of General of Division Nansouty's 1st Heavy Cavalry Division saw action during the Napoleonic Wars, including in the Battle of Austerlitz, Battle of Friedland, Battle of Wagram, Battle of Borodino (commanded by General of Brigade Defrance), Battle of Leipzig, Battle of Laon, and Battle of Waterloo. The Carabiniers were restored as a single régiment de Monsieur after the second Bourbon restoration.

By 1814, there were two regiments of Carabiniers with their distinctive style of helmet, which was temporarily adopted by the cuirassiers. The Carabiniers were present in Paris in June 1848 for the creation of the Republic, when nine regiments were brought in to maintain peace, the first time in 200 years that carabiniers were again serving as military police. From 1852 the Carabiniers were a part of the Army of the Second French Empire, but did not serve in the Crimean War. In 1870, they saw service again as a single regiment, but now as part of the Imperial Guard. Following the Franco-Prussian War, the Carabiniers were amalgamated with the 11th Cuirassier regiment on 4 February 1871.

The 1-11e Régiment de Cuirassiers of the modern French Army can accordingly trace its origin, in part, to the 19th Century Carabiniers. By coincidence the present day regiment is stationed in Carpiagne within Provence, once the domain of their former commander.

=== British Carabiniers ===
The Carabiniers (6th Dragoon Guards) was a cavalry regiment of the British Army. The regiment was descended from the Ninth Horse regiment, raised in response to the Duke of Monmouth's rebellion in 1685, the first year of the reign of King James II. Colonelcy of the Ninth Horse was given to Richard, 2nd Viscount Lumley of Waterford. In accordance with tradition of the time, the regiment became known as Lord Lumley's Horse. In 1691, during King William's Irish Campaign, the regiment distinguished itself, as a result of which it was posted to London and renamed The King's Carabiniers. However, in 1741 the regiment became known as the 3rd Regiment of Horse, and in 1756 became the 3rd Horse. Through the Napoleonic Wars period the regiment was called the 6th Dragoon Guards, becoming 3rd Dragoon Guards (Carabiniers) in 1826. In 1920, the regiment briefly became known as The Carabiniers (6th Dragoon Guards) again before being amalgamated in 1922. Although the regiment's first battle honour is for the Battle of Blenheim, it did not take a notable part in any major battle of the British Army during the Napoleonic Wars, but did serve in the Crimean War. The regiment also served in the Boer Wars, although by far most of its battle honours come from the First World War. Known in the British Army as "The Carbs", the regiment survived as the 3rd Carabiniers (Prince of Wales's Dragoon Guards) until 1971 when it was amalgamated with the Royal Scots Greys during the Palace of Holyrood House parade in July 1971. In attendance was Her Majesty The Queen, who is the regimental Colonel-in-Chief. At the same time the role of the regiment changed from cavalry to mechanised infantry. As a result of the amalgamation, no regiment bears the title of Carabiniers in the British Army today, although the Royal Scots Dragoon Guards are sub-titled "Carabiniers and Greys".

There also existed the Hampshire Carabiniers as a Yeomanry cavalry regiment that was formed during the French Revolutionary Wars, and remained known as the Carabiniers late in the Victorian era. The regiment served in the Boer Wars, and the First World War, after which the Hampshire Yeomanry was re-roled as an Artillery Regiment and then amalgamated with the Hampshire Royal Horse Artillery to become the 95th (Hampshire Yeomanry) Field Brigade, Royal Artillery.

=== Saxon Carabiniers ===
The Saxon Carabiniers were formed after the reorganisation of the Royal Saxon Army in 1765, and survived in the Imperial German Army until 1918. The regiment was known to have used lances in its pre-First World War service.

=== Prussian carabiniers ===
- Life Carabinier Regiment (German: 11. regiment Leib-Karabiniers)
- von der Marwitzsches Volunteer Corps 1807, Carabiniers of the Uhlan Squadron

=== Netherlands karabiniers ===
The Dutch mounted karabiniers date back to 2nd (Heavy) Cavalry regiment raised in the 1680s, however they briefly ceased to exist during the period of the Batavian Republic. The Allied order of battle at the Battle of Waterloo included the Netherlands Cavalry Division (Divisie Cavalerie) commanded by Lieutenant-Generaal Jean Alphonse Baron de Collaert, which, in turn, included a brigade of three Karabinier regiments newly raised from the cuirassiers of the Dutch contribution to the Napoleonic La Grande Armée:

- 1st Heavy Cavalry Brigade (Brigade Zware Cavalerie) Generaal-Majoor Jonkheer A. D. Trip

1st Carabiniers (Regiment karabiniers No. 1) Luitenant-Kolonel L. P. Coenegracht
2nd Carabiniers (Regiment karabiniers No. 2) Kolonel J. B. de Bruijn
3rd Carabiniers (Regiment karabiniers No. 3) Luitenant-Kolonel C. M. Lechleitner

All three regiments along with the dragoons of the Guard became dragoons in 1849.

=== Russian Karabinery ===
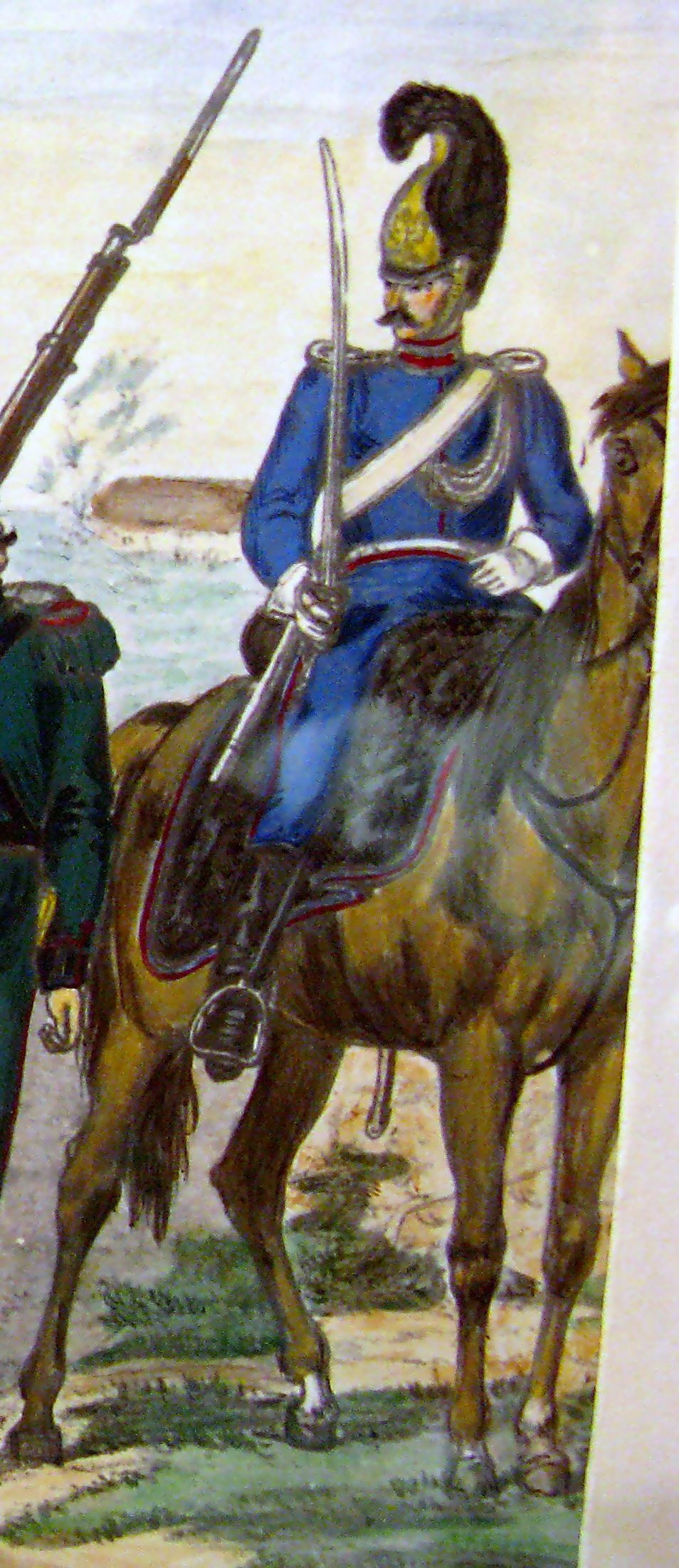
A Pole from a Russian Army carabinier regiment that joined the Polish November Uprising forces.

Carabiniers first appeared in the Russian Army during the reign of Catherine II in 1763, and eventually numbered sixteen regiments. However, Emperor Paul I, who intensely disliked any reminder of his mother’s reign, renamed six into dragoons and the remainder into cuirassiers. The carabiniers did return to the Russian cavalry after 1803 as the four select marksmen called flankers in each platoon armed with carbines in all cavalry regiments for the first part of Napoleonic wars, before being reinvented as infantry regiments in Nicolas I time.

=== Swedish Carabiniers ===
Swedish Kungliga Skånska Karabinierregementet ("Cavallerie de Scanie") were created in 1791 before the Napoleonic Wars by renaming the Skånska Kavalleriregemente and numbered eight squadrons of about 1,000 officers and troopers organised in two battalions serving in the 4th Swedish Division of the Walmoden Corps for the 1813-1814 campaign. The regiment was renamed into the Skånska Hussars by 1914.

=== Westphalian Carabiniers ===
The short-lived Westphalian army of 1807–14 created by Napoleon as an allied force for service with the Grande Armée, included a unit of the Royal Guard designated as the Jäger Carabiniers Battalion.

=== Piedmont-Savoy Carabinieri ===
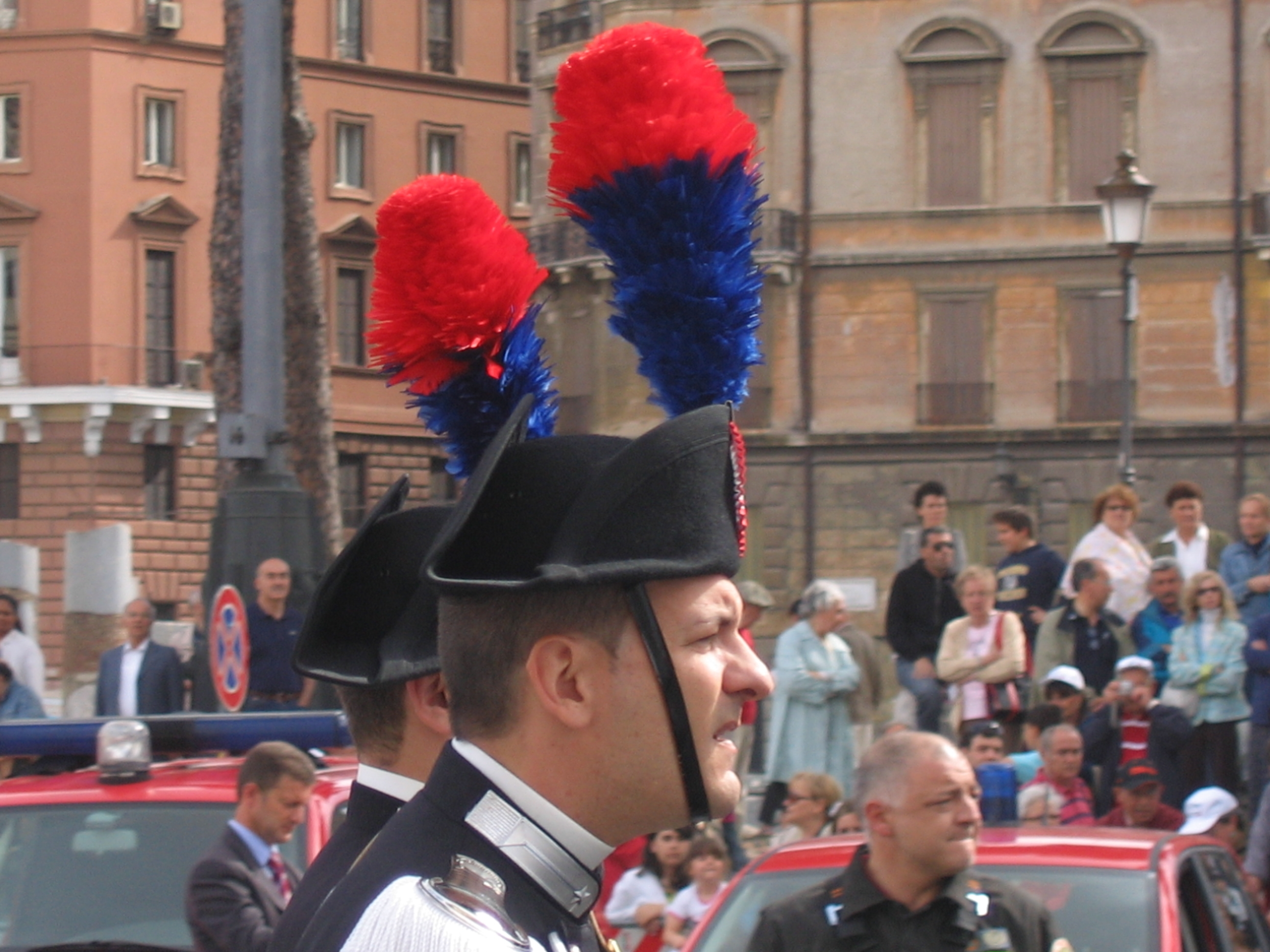

The Carabinieri corps was created by King Victor Emmanuel I of Savoy, with the aim of providing Piedmont with a police corps similar to the French Gendarmerie, which was both a combat regiment and a mounted military police force.

After French soldiers had occupied Turin at the end of the 18th century and later abandoned it to the Kingdom of Piedmont-Savoy, the corps of Carabinieri Reali (Royal Carabiniers) was instituted under the Regie Patenti (Royal Patents) of July 13, 1814 within the Kingdom of Sardinia Guard.

=== Naples Carabiniers ===
The Carabiniers of the Kingdom of Naples were a cavalry regiment formed in the early 1820s.

=== South African Carabiniers ===
Originating from the 1st and 2nd Royal Natal Carabiniers, the South African Carabiniers served during the Boer Wars as mounted infantry, and infantry during the First World War's South-West Africa campaign, and later as the 1st Royal Natal Carbineers in the Second World War, notably participating with the 8th Army at the Second Battle of El Alamein in October 1942 as part of the Commonwealth Union Defence Force contingent's 1st South African Division and later in the Italian Campaign. The Natal Carbineers saw service in a counter-insurgency capacity in northern Namibia (South West Africa) for three months from August 1976, and thereafter in numerous modular deployments over the next decade until 1989.

=== Australian Carbineers ===
The Bushveldt Carbineers (BVC) were a short-lived, multinational mounted infantry regiment of the British Army, raised in South Africa during the Second Boer War.

The 320-strong regiment was formed in February 1901 and commanded by an Australian, Colonel R. W. Lenehan. It was based at Pietersburg, 180 miles north of Pretoria, and saw action in the Spelonken region of the Northern Transvaal during 1901-1902. About forty percent of the men in the BVC were Australians, and the regiment also included about forty surrendered Boers who had been recruited from the internment camps.

The unit was made infamous by the trial and execution of Harry 'Breaker' Morant and Peter Handcock, who were serving members of the unit at the time of their arrest and who were charged with war crimes committed while they were in the unit.

== Law enforcement carabiniers ==
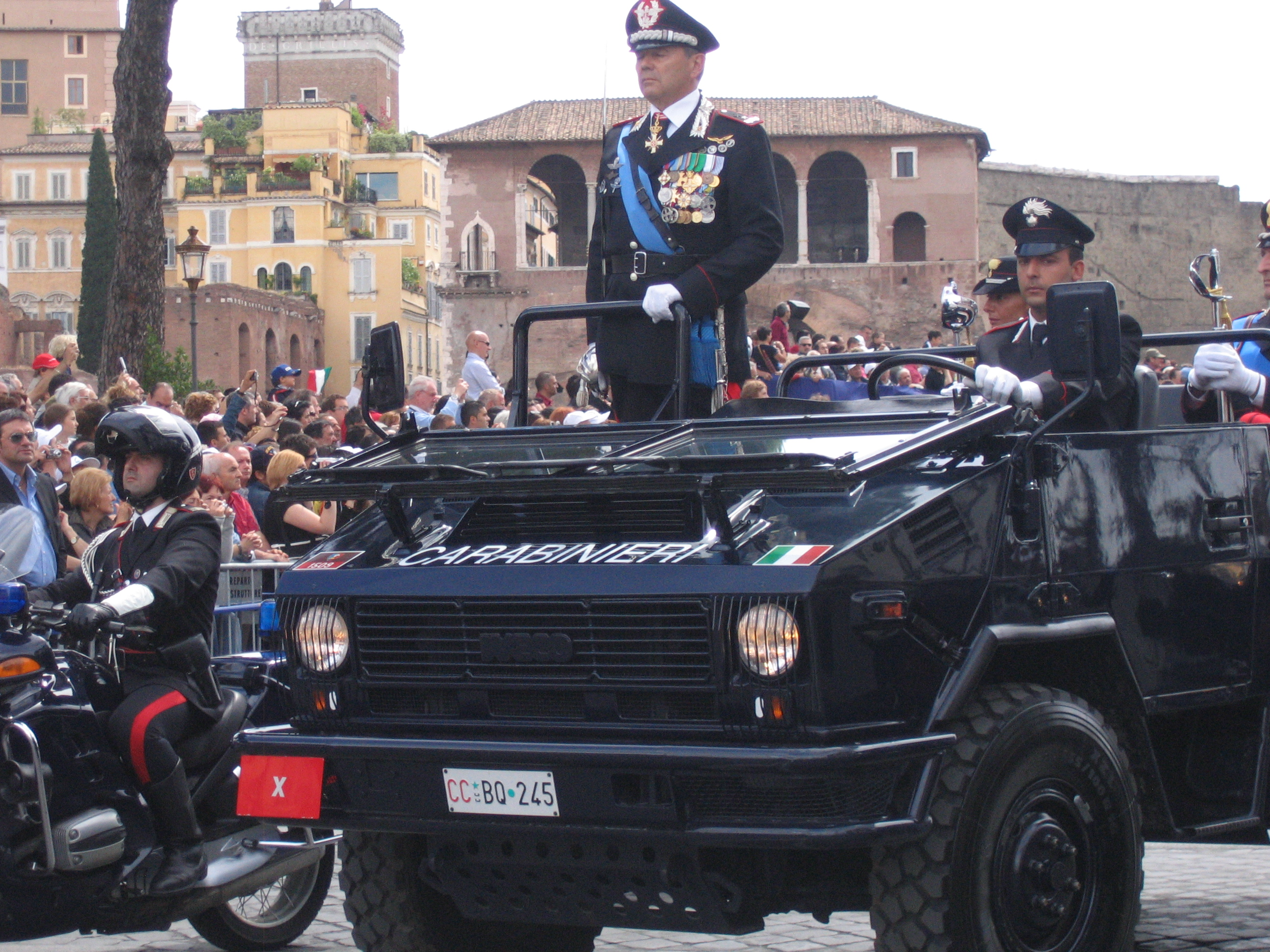
Senior Carabinieri General in a VM 90 during the 2007 "Republic Day" parade in Italy.

=== Italian Carabinieri ===
The Arma dei Carabinieri (literally Arm of Carabiniers or Arm of Carabineers) was formerly called the Corpo dei Carabinieri as a branch of the Italian Army, but is usually known simply as the Carabinieri performing gendarmerie role. It originates from the amalgamation of the Piedmont-Savoy and Naples Carabinieri corps after unification of Italy, and although they remained a combat cavalry regiment, they were not numbered with the Cavalleria di Linea (Cavalry of the Line) after 1871.

Both a military and a police corps, the Carabinieri have fought in every conflict in which Italy has been involved in since 1871, suffering heavy losses and being awarded many decorations for gallantry.

The Carabinieri is currently a branch of armed forces (alongside the Army, Navy and Air Force), thus ending their long standing role as the Prima Arma dell'Esercito (First Corps of the Army). It is likely that antonomasia by which the Carabinieri will continue to be referred will remain the Arma.

In recent years, Carabinieri units have been dispatched on peacekeeping missions, including Kosovo, Afghanistan, and Iraq. In 2003 twelve Carabinieri were killed in a suicide bomb attack on their base in Nasiriyah, near Basra, in southern Iraq, in the largest Italian military loss of life in a single action since the Second World War (see 2003 Nasiriyah bombing).

=== Spanish Carabineros under the Monarchy and Republic ===
This para-military force was created in the 19th century under the Spanish monarchy, performing the role of frontier guards especially in the Pyrenees. They were distinguished by dark blue uniforms with shakos or round forage caps. Under the Spanish Republic the Carabineros were subordinated to the Finance Department of the Home Ministry, and consisted of customs and excise officials numbering some 15,000 by the Spanish Civil War of 1936–39. They remained an armed force subject to military discipline. About 8,750 carabineros remained loyal to the Republican Government, providing a core of trained manpower for the Republican forces. After the war the victorious Nationalist Government disbanded the Carabineros and replaced them for frontier duties with units of the Civil Guard.

=== Chilean carabineros ===
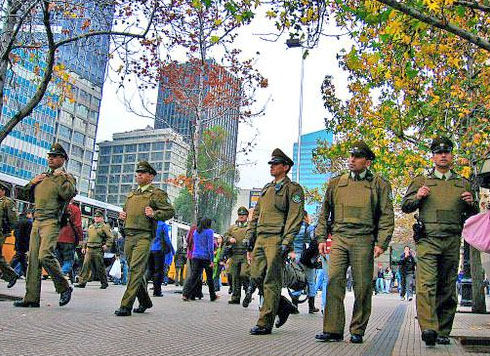
Carabineros de Chile

Carabineros de Chile are the uniformed Chilean national military police force The first policing organization with the name "Carabiniers" was the Corps of Carabiniers, in Spanish Cuerpo de Carabineros, formed in 1903 to bring law and order to the historic Araucanía region of Southern Chile. In 1908 the Carabiniers' School (Escuela de Carabineros, currently located in Providencia) was created. On April 27, 1927, President Carlos Ibáñez del Campo merged the Fiscal Police (Policía Fiscal), the Rural Police (Policia Rural), and the Cuerpo de Carabineros into the Carabiniers of Chile, one unified institution under the direction of the national government. The organization still carries the name given to it by Ibáñez, who became the Carabiniers' first Director General.

In 1973, the Carabiniers, headed by General Cesar Mendoza Duran, later appointed Director General, joined the Chilean coup of 1973 under the leadership of the Army, Navy and Air Forces leaders, that overthrew President Salvador Allende. As such, the Carabiniers' commander was a formal member of the Military Government Junta (1973–1990).

Today the Carabiniers form part of the Ministry of the Interior.

=== Colombian carabineros ===
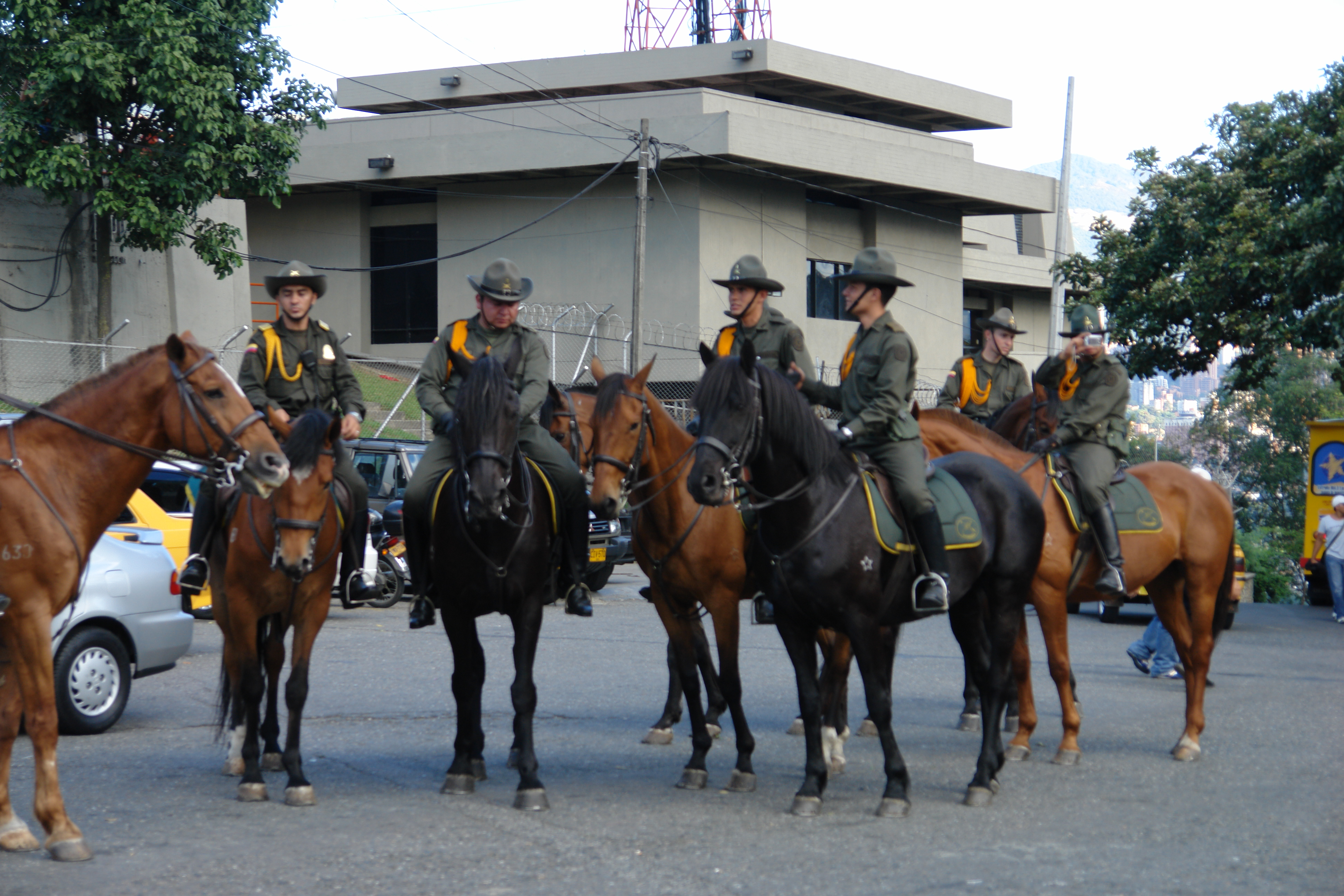
Mounted Carabineros in Medellín.

National Police of Colombia has mobile units called Mobile Carabinier Squadrons or Escuadrones Móviles de Carabineros in Spanish (EMCAR). These are specialised units of the Colombian National Police, part of its Directorate of Carabineers and Rural Security (Dirección de Carabineros y Seguridad Rural) The mission of these mobile squadrons is to provide highway security, control traffic and prevent accidents. Among their objectives is to interact and socialize with civilians to create neighborhood watch and collaboration. Formed in 1846 by President Tomas Cipriano de Mosquera, they are the oldest National Police formation.

=== Bolivian Carabineros ===
The Bolivian National Police became institutionalized on the national level in 1937 with the creation of the National Corps of Carabineers (Cuerpo Nacional de Carabineros) and its professional training school, the Police School (Escuela de Policía), later renamed the National Police Academy (Academia Nacional de Policías). The carabineers constituted a post-Chaco War merger of the Military Police, the Gendarmerie Corps (Cuerpo de Gendarmería), the paramilitary Security Police (Policía de Seguridad), and the army's Carabineer Regiment (Regimiento de Carabineros).

Prior to 1952 the Carabineros came under the Ministry of National Defence and were considered an extension of the Bolivian Army. Responsibility for the force subsequently was transferred to the Ministry of the Interior, although the Carabineros remain a force under military discipline and are available as a reserve for the army. Today, the 5,000-member paramilitary National Guard (Guardia Nacional), a branch of the Bolivian National Police, is still referred to as the Carabineros.

The Bolivian Carabineros are the only force having nationwide responsibility for law enforcement, including customs, traffic police and frontier guard responsibilities.

=== Moldovan Carabinieri ===
The Ministry of Internal Affairs of Moldova maintains a gendarmerie-type force affiliated with the Moldovan National Army known as the Trupele de Carabinieri, which is the Romanian language name for Carabiniers.

== Sources ==
- Andreyev, A.P., A present for a soldier on the 250th anniversary of the 13 Leib-Grenadier Yerevan (former Butyrsk) Regiment 1642-1892, St. Petersburg, 1892 (Russian: Андреев А. П. Подарок солдату к 250 годовщине 13 лейб-гренадерского Эриванского (бывшего Бутырского полка) 1642—1892. СПб.,1892)
- Bolloten, Burnett, The Spanish Civil War: Revolution and Counterrevolution, UNC Press, 1991
- Bukhari, Emir, Napoleon's cuirassiers and carabiniers, Osprey Publishing Ltd., London, 1981
- Chant, Christopher, The Handbook of British Regiments, Routledge, London, 1988 ISBN 0-415-00241-9
- d'Alméras, Henri, La femme amoureuse dans la vie et dans la littérature, A. Michel, Paris, 1920
- De La Calle, Dolores Bastida, La Campaña Carlista (1872–1876) en Le Monde Hlustré: Los dibujos de Daniel Vierge, Espacio, Tiempo y Forma, Serie Vil, Historia del Arte, t. 3, Le Monde lllustré, 1990
- Dempsey, Guy C., Napoleon's Mercenaries: Foreign units in the French Army under the Consulate and Empire, 1799 to 1814, Greenhill Books, London, 2002
- Detaille, Édouard; Richard, Jules (1992) [1885-1889]. L'Armée Française: An Illustrated History of the French Army, 1790–1885. New York City: Waxtel & Hasenauer. ISBN 0-9632558-0-0.
- Fernández, Jorge Sánchez, Valladolid durante la Guerra de la Independencia Española (1808–1814), Universidad de Valladolid, 2002
- Funcken, Liliane; Funcken, Fred (1984), Arms and uniforms: Napoleonic Wars, vol. Part 2, London: Ward Lock Ltd.
- Jasinski, René, A travers le XVIIe siècle, A.G. Nizet, Paris, 1981
- Johnson, David, The French cavalry 1792-1815, Belmont Publishing, London, 1989
- Knötel, Richard, Knötel, Herbert, & Sieg Herbert, Uniforms of the World: A compendium of Army, Navy and Air Force uniforms 1700-1937, Charles Scribner's Sons, New York, 1980
- Le Bas, M.Ph., L'Univers: histoire et description de tous les peuples, Dictionnaire Encyclopedique de la France, Vol.3, Firmin Didot Freres, Paris, 1841
- Nafziger, George, The Russian Army 1800-1815, Rafm Co. Inc., Cambridge Ontario, 1983
- Olofsson, Magnus, The Army of Kingdom of Sweden during Napoleonic Wars,
- Paterson, Ian A., Regiments That Served With The 7th Armoured Division,
- Peirats, José, Los anarquistas en la crisis política española (1869–1939), Utopía Libertaria, Libros de Anarres, Buenos Aires, 2006 ISBN 987-22440-4-9
- Schou, Henrik, Danish military in the Napoleonic Wars, Order of Battle Corps Walmoden September 1813,
- Stein, Markus (August 2007). "The Infantry of the Bavarian Army 1812–1813: the Uniform Plates of Johann Cantler".
- Torres, Carlos Canales, Breve historia de la Guerra de Independencia Espanola, Ediciones Nowtilus S.L., 2006
- van Uythoven, Geert, The Army of the Netherlands in 1815, after the Belgian and Dutch forces had been united on 21 April 1815,
