= Highway Police (Colombia) =

The Highway Police (Spanish: Policía de Carreteras) is the main body enforcing road regulations in Colombia to control land transportation and traffic, prevention of accidentality and crimes, similar to a highway patrol but with a nationwide area of operations.

== History ==
During the presidency of Miguel Abadía Méndez in 1929 by Decree 847 the Colombian National Police is adjudicated with the creation of a body to be in charge of roads and highways. In 1936 by Decree 1715 the Highway Police or Policia Vial is established to watch over railways, Aerial tramways, watercraft, highways and streets with the main function of enforcing transit, transportation and motor vehicle laws.

On October 25, by Decree 2816 of 1955 the National Police designs and implements the Unidades de Intervención y Reacción or Intervention and Reaction Units (UNIR), a strategy focused on combating terrorism and delinquency on highways. On January 19, 1999, the organizational structure is defined and put under the management of the Operative Directorate of the National Police.

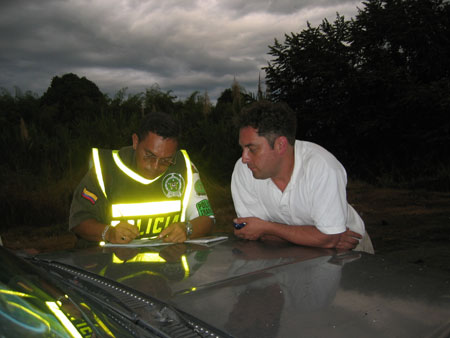
Highway Police officer giving a violation ticket on the Bogota-Armenia Highway

With this change the institution intended to base the Policia de Carreteras on the Highway Patrol units in the United States and creates a unit called Agrupación Vial de Carabineros or Highway Carabiniers Group conformed by improved UNIR units, better equipped and trained to fight illegal groups in Colombia, but failed and was reinstated to the Policia de Carreteras. Due to corruption problems the zoning of the Highway Police (Zona de Carreteras) was changed from seven centralized and dependent zones to decentralized entities attached to the organizational structure of the Colombian National Police Departments, each with a central command and were based on every Department of Colombia.
