= Directorate of Carabineers and Rural Security =

Police force

Colombian Carabineros Badge

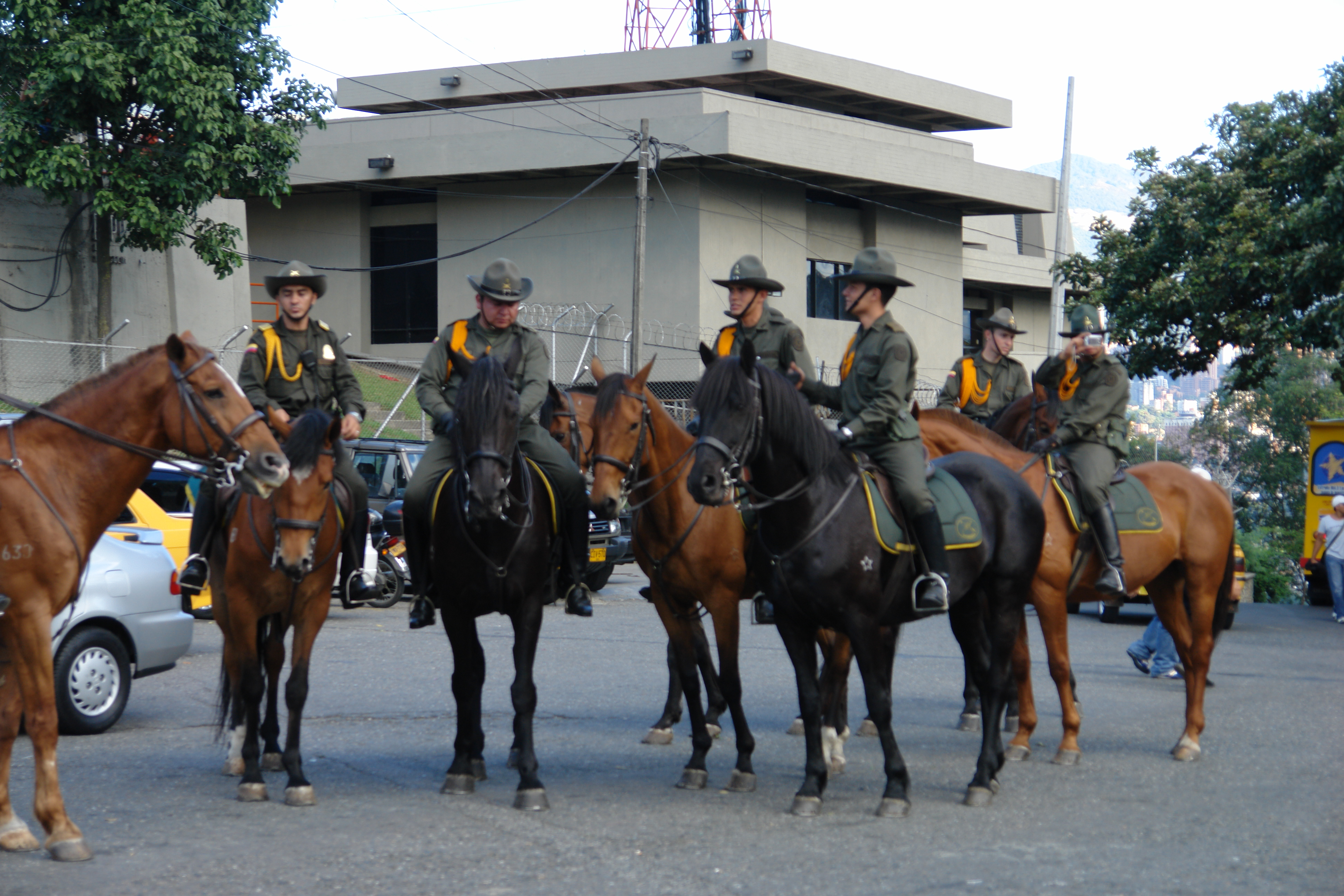
Mounted Carabineros in Medellín.

The Directorate of Carabineers and Rural Security of the National Police of Colombia supervises the Mounted Police, or Carabineros Corps, a rural paramilitary police force resulting from the 1993 reform to patrol and maintain public order in conflict zones and in the national parks. Despite its reestablishment in 1993, the Carabineros Corps is actually Colombia's oldest police force, created by a law of May 18, 1841. Beginning in 1936, a Chilean mission helped to professionalize the corps.

The Carabineros carry out counterinsurgency missions, frequently in conjunction with army units. Headquartered at the department and national territory capitals, the Carabineros are maintained in squadrons that were separate from those of the regular police; they wore distinctive uniforms and often traveled as mounted units.

In 2006 there were 9,800 Carabineros officers, located principally in rural areas and trained in irregular conflict and in the rescue of hostages.

Units of the Mobile Carabinier Squadrons (EMCAR), operating in 120-member squadrons, were formed in 2004 as a part of President Álvaro Uribe’s Democratic Security and Defense Policy (usually referred to as Democratic Security Policy) to provide extra support for police activities in conflict areas. Special Carabineros Corps units also provide backup to urban police during public events or civil protests.

== See also ==
- Carabinier
