= Cuerpo Técnico de Investigación =

Technical Investigation Team Cuerpo Técnico de Investigación
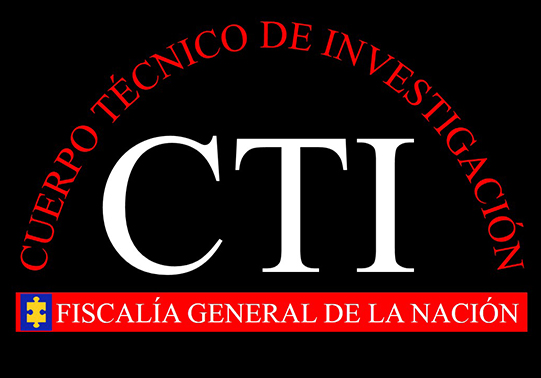
- Common name: Fiscalía
- Abbreviation: CTI
- Motto: En la calle y en los territorios "On the street and in the territories"

Agency overview
- Formed: 1991
- Preceding agency: Dirección Nacional de Instrucción Criminal

Jurisdictional structure
- Operations jurisdiction: Colombia

Operational structure
- Headquarters: Diagonal 22 B No. 52-01, Bogotá DC
- Agency executive: Alberto Acevedo Quintero, Director

Notables
- Program: Criminal prosecution and asset forfeiture

Website
- www.fiscalia.gov.co

The CTI (Spanish: Cuerpo Técnico de Investigación, English: Technical Investigation Team) is a division of Office of the Attorney General of Colombia (La Fiscalía General de la Nación).

== Purpose ==
The main function for the CTI is to advise the Attorney General (Fiscal General) in the determination of policies and strategies related with the judicial police functions, in the topics as crime investigation, forensic services, genetic services and in the management of the technical and judicial information useful for penal investigation.

Furthermore, the CTI takes care of planning, arranging, managing, controlling and executing the functions of Judicial Police in La Fiscalia. It organizes and controls the fulfillment of the investigation policies and strategies, forensic and genetic services and the management of useful data in the penal investigation inside the CTI.

Also, the CTI, advise the Attorney General (Fiscal General) in the planning of strategies and procedures related to security and communications in the different territorial levels of the bureau. CTI promotes the exchange of information among the Colombian security offices to develop operations against the delinquency.

== Division ==
The CTI has two branches: Investigation Division and Criminology Division. The Investigation Division is organized in four divisions: Department of Investigation and National Units Support; Department of Criminal Analysis; Department of Telematic Control and Department of Security and Logistic Support. The Criminology Division is organized in two divisions: Department of Identity Verification and the Department of Criminology and Labs.

Moreover, the CTI is divided in Local Departments, which are small offices in every main city and every Colombian department.
