= National Police of Colombia =

National Police of Colombia Policía Nacional de Colombia
- Emblem of the National Police of Colombia

- Flag of the National Police of Colombia

- Roundel of the National Police of Colombia
- Motto: Dios y Patria; God and Fatherland

Agency overview
- Formed: November 5, 1891
- Employees: 140,000 (2018)
- Annual budget: US$ 3.6 to 4 billion (Col$49.210 billion) (2008)

Jurisdictional structure
- National agency: Colombia
- Operations jurisdiction: Colombia
- General nature: Local civilian police

Operational structure
- Headquarters: Bogotá, Colombia
- Elected officer responsible: Ministry of Defense
- Parent agency: Colombian Ministry of Defense
- Direcciones: 8: Seguridad Ciudadana; Carabineros y Seguridad Rural; Investigación Criminal; Inteligencia Policial; Antinarcóticos; Protección y Servicios Especiales; Antisecuestro y Antiextorsión; Tránsito y Transporte
- Regions and Departmental Commands: List: 5 Metropolitan Police; 32 Department (State) Police; 8 Police Regions

Facilities
- Airbases: 5

Website
- policia.gov.co
- Colors: White and Green; March: Hymn of the National Police of Colombia Source

The National Police of Colombia (Spanish: Policía Nacional de Colombia) is the national police force of the Republic of Colombia. It is controlled by the Ministry of Defense, and is the only civilian police force in Colombia.

The force's official responsibilities are to protect the Colombian nation, enforce the law by constitutional mandate, maintain and guarantee the necessary conditions for public freedoms and rights and to ensure peaceful cohabitation among the population.

== History ==
=== Creation in the 19th century ===
During the second half of the 19th century, Colombia went through many political changes and struggled to define itself as a nation. Tensions between the two main political parties, the Colombian Liberal Party and the Colombian Conservative Party, escalated into numerous civil as they debated the establishment of a political system based on either between federalism or centralism, among other major differences.

The National Police of Colombia was established by Law 90 of 1888, under government orders, as a dependency of the then Ministry of Government. It was intended to function as a gendarmerie for Bogotá. The new institution was planned to be a force of 300 gendarmes divided into three companies, commanded by a captain, two lieutenants and a second lieutenant, all overseenby two high-ranking officers.

On October 23, 1890, acting president Carlos Holguín Mallarino sanctioned a law authorizing the hiring of qualified trainers from either the United States or Europe to organize and train the newly established National Police. Colombian officials selected a French commissioner named Jean Marie Marcelin Gilibert. The institution was formally established by decree 1000 of November 5, 1891.

The initial mission of the National Police was to preserve public tranquility and protect people, as well as public and private properties. By constitutional law, the institution was required to enforce and guarantee the rights of the people, uphold the constitution and its laws, and obey their authority. Its function also included the authority to take action to prevent crimes and prosecute and arrest lawbreakers. The National Police was intended to recognize no privileges or distinctions among the general population, with the only exception being for international treaties established in the Constitution that granted immunity to members of diplomatic missions.

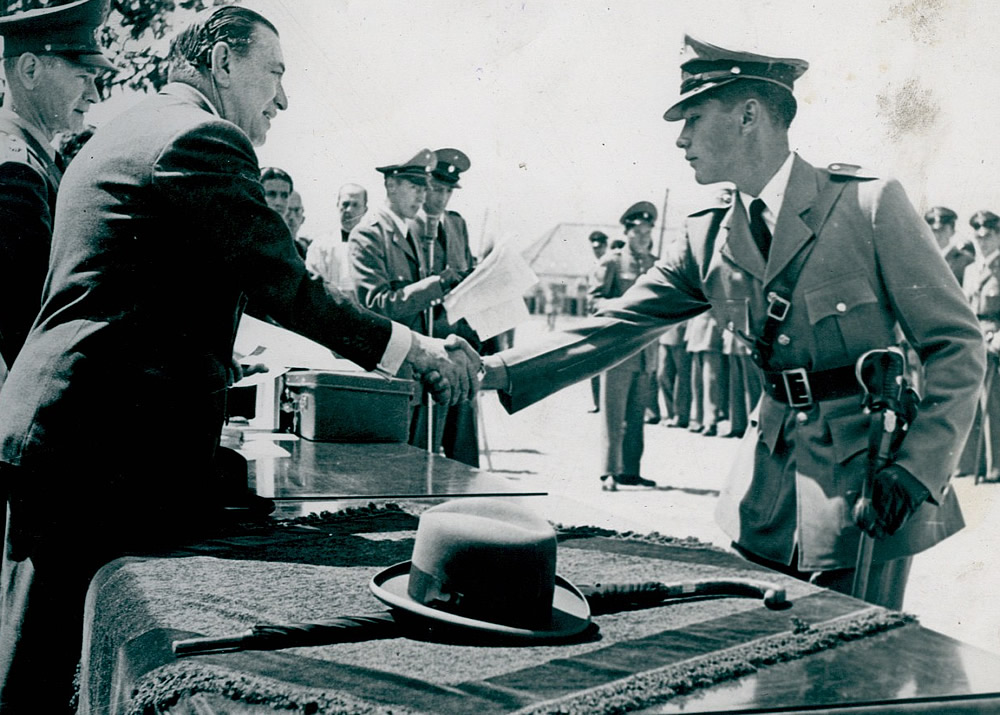
President Roberto Urdaneta Arbelaez

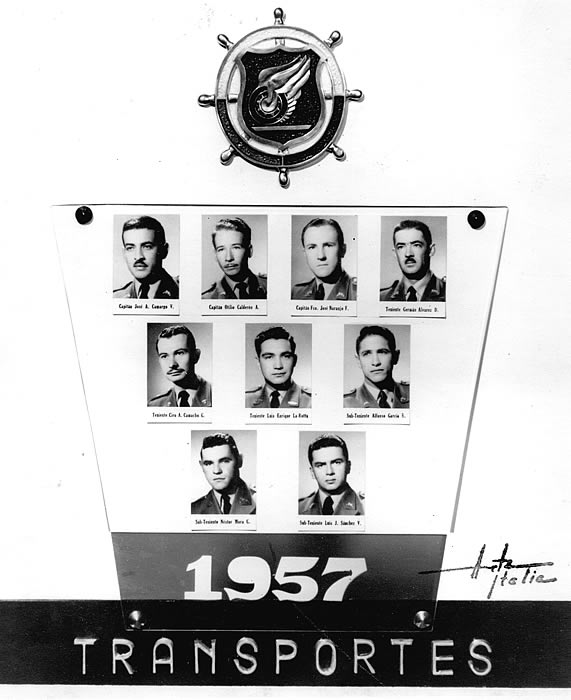
Oficial de Transportes, 1957

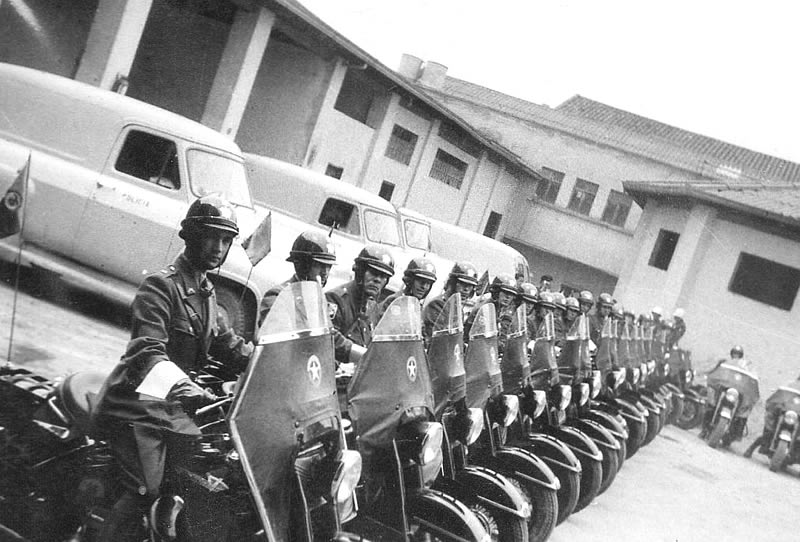
First motorcycle squad, 1953

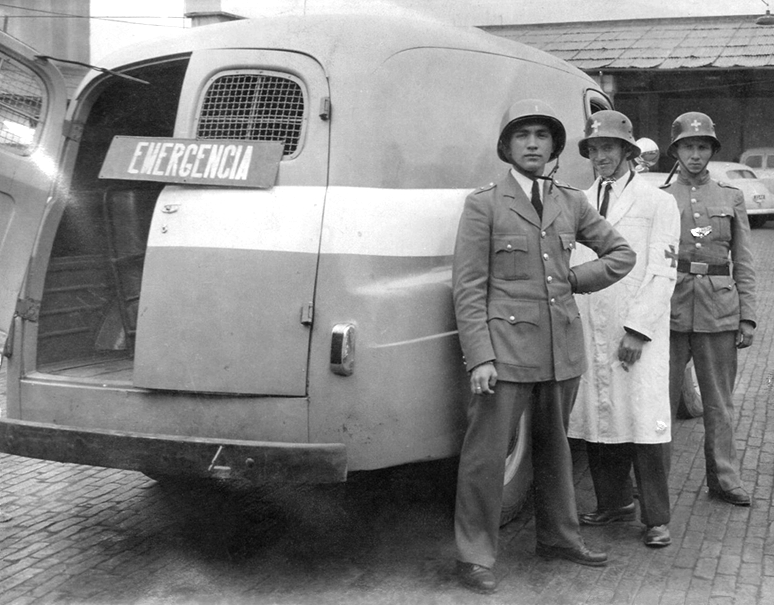
First Emergency Vehicle Ford March 1952

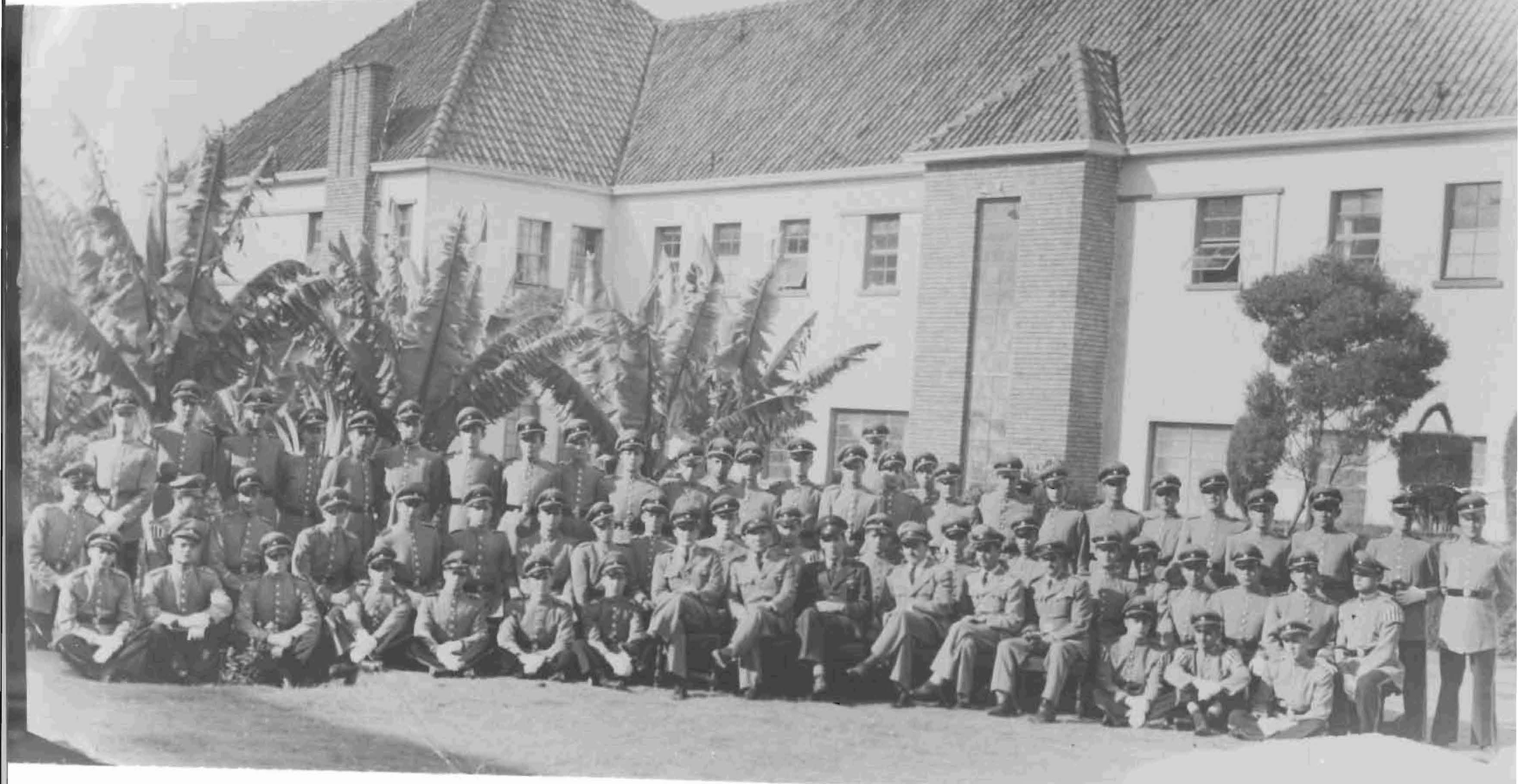
Class Cadetes Carlos Holguin 1951 Escuela General Santander

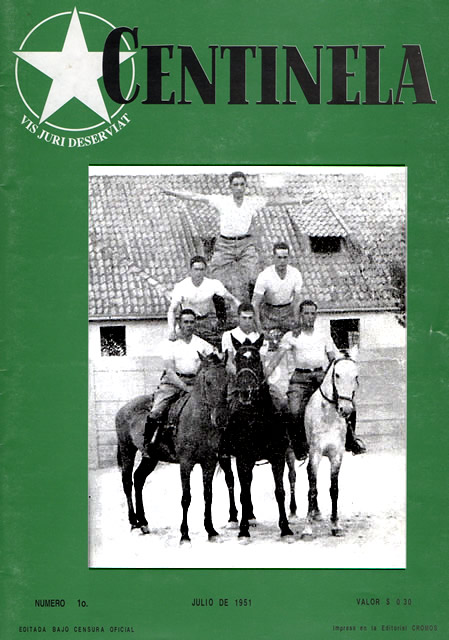
Centinela, magazine from class Cadetes Carlos Holguin, 1951

After a civil war broke out in 1895 during the presidency of Rafael Núñez, the president went absent and Miguel Antonio Caro temporarily assumed office. Caro declared a general state of emergency, in which authority over the National Police was transferred to the Ministry of War on January 21, 1896, and its members received the same privileges as military personnel.

When the aged president Manuel Antonio Sanclemente was replaced by Vice President José Manuel Marroquín, who assumed the presidency, the National Police was restructured and organized in a military manner. It was then transferred back to the Ministry of Government. To guarantee the security of Bogotá, the National Police was divided into seven districts to cover the entire city. A mutual fund called Caja de Gratificaciones was set up to pay benefits to service members, financed by the penalties imposed on the civilian population. By 1899, the National Police had a force of 944 agents divided into eight divisions.

=== 20th century ===
When the most intense of the civil wars broke out, known as the Thousand Days' War (1899–1902), the National Police was once again assigned to the Ministry of War until September 6, 1901. Under the Decree 1380 of September 16, 1902 the National Police created the Presidential Palace Honor Guard Corps with the name Guardia Civil de la Ciudad de Bogotá (Civil Guard of the City of Bogotá).

During the presidency of Rafael Reyes, the government authorized by decree 743 of 1904, the transfer of the Police to the Ministry of War, with the president micro-managing the institution. By authorization of Law 43 the Judicial Commissary of Police was established under the dependency of the General Command of the National Police to investigate crimes within its jurisdiction.

From 1906 to 1909 the government created a cloned institution with similar functions to the National Police named the National Gendarmerie Corps (Cuerpo de Gendarmeria Nacional) intended to function decentralized from the National Police command and more militarized regime, managed by the Ministry of War. When General Jorge Holguín suppressed the National Gendarmerie Corps, the province governors were given the authority to organize police services at their own will.

Law 14 signed on November 4, 1915 defined the National Police functions to "preserve public tranquility in Bogotá and any other place where needed to execute its functions, protect citizens and aid the constitutional law by enforcing it and the judicial branch of government." The institution was divided into three groups; the first in charge of security and vigilante functions, a second group acting as civil gendarmerie guard whose main responsibility was protecting the postal service and controlling the prison system. The third group functioned as the judicial police.

In 1916 the institution was trained by the Spanish Guardia Civil in their doctrine, mainly related to criminology. They were restructured by Decree 1628 of October 9 of 1918, assigning the direction, sub-direction and Inspector General duties to officers seconded from the National Army of Colombia - thus the basis for the Prussian style dress uniforms used today. Later the same year, as authorized by a Law 74 of November 19, 1919, the Colombian president hired a French instructor and chief of detectives, who was an expert in the anthropometric system to train the National Police.

In 1924 the Criminal Investigation School was founded to update personnel working in this area. In 1929 the Colombian government in agreement with the Argentine government, hired Enrique Medina Artola to train the Colombian Police in dactylography to replace the anthropometric system. In 1934 in an agreement with the Spanish government the National Police was trained in scientific identification until 1948.

On July 7, 1937 by Decree 1277, the government authorized the creation of the General Santander Academy, which began operating in 1940 as an institute for every police recruit in the force. In 1939 the Colombian government receives the first cooperation agreement with the United States, through a Federal Bureau of Investigation (FBI) committee headed by agent Edgar K. Thompson.

=== El Bogotazo and La Violencia ===
In 1948 when the civil unrest known as "El Bogotazo" broke out, after the assassination of the popular presidential candidate Jorge Eliecer Gaitán, the stability of the country was abruptly interrupted. This generated a period of civil unrest known as La Violencia, which lasted for almost a decade. The government then decided to restructure the institution once again, with the cooperation and advice from the British. The English mission was composed of Colonel Douglas Gordon, Colonel Eric M. Roger, Lieutenant Colonel Bertrand W.H. Dyer, Major Frederick H. Abbot and Major William Parham, primarily assisted by Colombian lawyers Rafael Escallón, Timoleón Moncada, Carlos Losano Losano, Jorge and Enrique Gutiérrez Anzola.

By Decree 0446 of February 14, 1950 the National Police created the Gonzálo Jiménez de Quesada Non-Commissioned School to train mid-level enlisted staff under the management of the General Santander National Police Academy.

=== Military dictator, Gustavo Rojas Pinilla ===
On June 13, 1953 Lieutenant General Gustavo Rojas Pinilla seized power in a coup d'etat, assuming functions as President of Colombia. In an attempt to better organize the military forces, President Rojas declared the Decree 1814 on the same day officially renaming and revamping the General Command of the Military Forces of Colombia under the name of General Command of the Armed Forces of Colombia. It defined the conformation of the Armed Forces as comprising the Army, Navy, Aerospace Force and the National Police, the last assigned to the Ministry of War once again as a fourth military power, functioning with its own independent budget and organization, separate from the other branches as established by law.

The Ministry of War was later renamed as the Ministry of Defense. Many Police Academies were planned and constructed in other cities of Colombia. In 1953, the Antonio Nariño Police Academy in Barranquilla and the Alejandro Gutiérrez Police Academy in Manizales were opened, followed by a social plan for retirement and social security called Caja de Sueldos de la Policia Nacional by Decree 417 of 1954. The Eduardo Cuevas Academy later opened in 1955 in the city of Villavicencio and the Carlos Holguín Academy in Medellín was opened in 1958. During this year a cooperation mission arrived from Chile to reorganize and train the Carabinier Corps in urban and rural surveillance.

As established in Law 193 of December 30, 1959, the Colombian nation assumed full financial responsibility for the National Police.

=== Colombian armed conflict ===
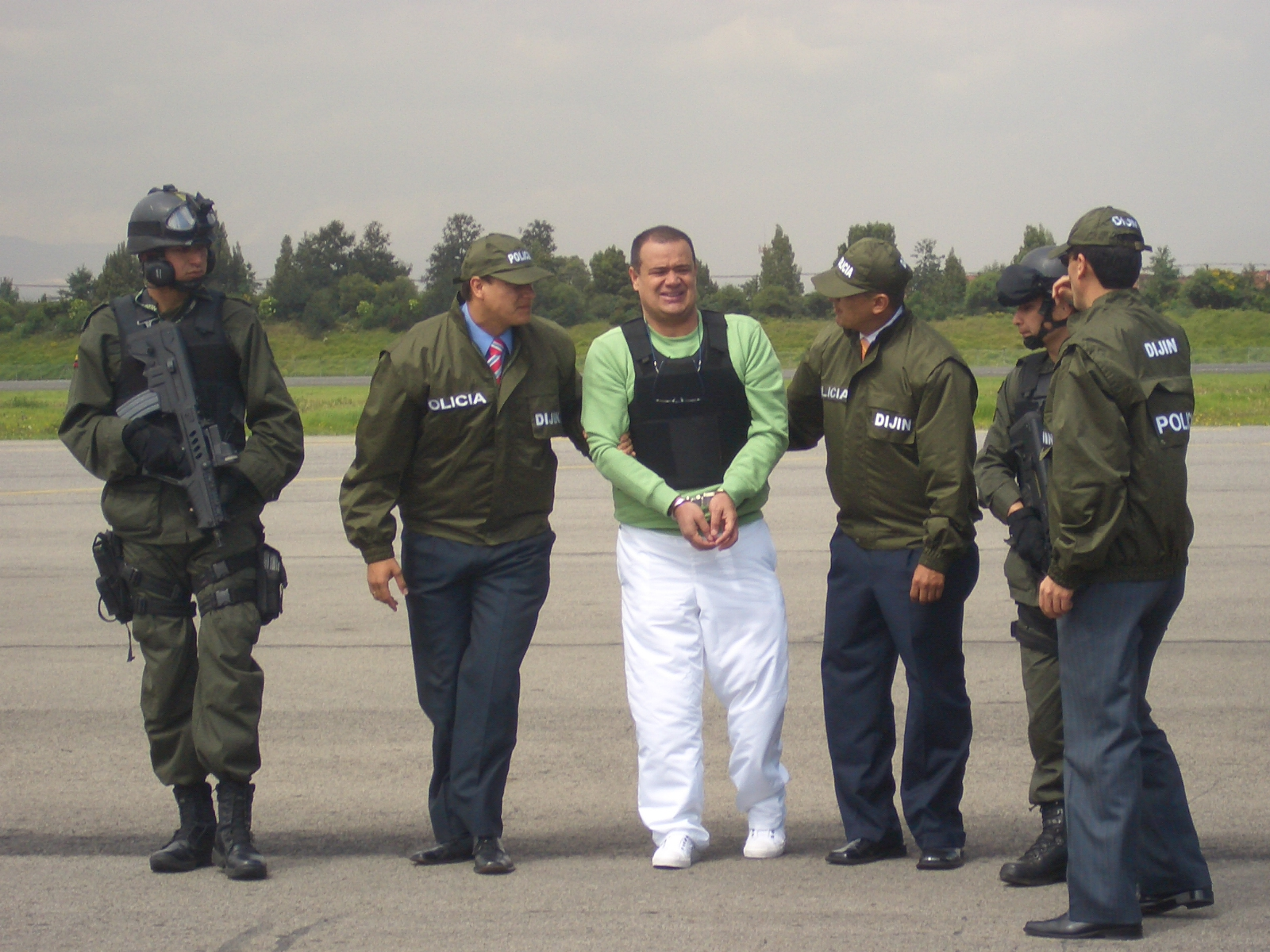
Luis Hernando Gomez-Bustamante, also known as "Rasguño", arrest performed by the National Police of Colombia

In 1964, as mandated by the Decree 349 of February 19, the Police Superior Academy was founded to indoctrinate officers with the rank of Major to the grade of Lieutenant Colonels. By 1977 the institution had created the first course for female officers.

During the 1960s and 1970s the National Police started facing guerrilla threats which were emerging during these years as a backlash from the political bipartisan struggle of the La Violencia years. There was also the growing problem of contraband and illegal drug trafficking and the involvement of the United States with the implementation of the Plan LASO as a proxy war plan against the expansion of Communism during the Cold War.

Later, the declaration of the war on drugs and the Plan Colombia would eventually help develop the present and ongoing Colombian armed conflict involving mainly guerrilla groups: the FARC-EP including its Patriotic Union Party, ELN, EPL, M-19, among many others; the drug cartels such as the Medellín Cartel, Cali Cartel, and other gangs; paramilitaries like the AUC and other groups. The Colombian National Police have been fighting against these many threats, tainted or involved in some cases of corruption and accusations of human rights violations, amid the efforts of the majority of the institution to change its image.

=== Police corruption in Colombia during the Pablo Escobar era (late 1970s–1993) ===
During the 1980s and early 1990s, Colombia was heavily impacted by the drug trade, primarily driven by the infamous Medellín Cartel led by Pablo Escobar. This period was marked by significant police corruption, as the vast wealth and influence of drug cartels infiltrated many levels of Colombian society, including law enforcement.

==== The influence of drug cartels ====
Pablo Escobar, known for his ruthlessness and wealth, used his financial power to corrupt officials and law enforcement agents across Colombia. The Medellín Cartel, at its height, generated billions of dollars annually from the cocaine trade. This immense wealth allowed Escobar to exert considerable influence over police officers through a combination of bribery and intimidation, often summarized by the phrase "plata o plomo" (silver or lead), meaning officers could accept a bribe or face violence. Escobar's cartel routinely bribed police officers to look the other way or actively assist in the cartel's operations. Many officers were offered substantial sums of money to provide intelligence, ignore drug trafficking activities, or facilitate the cartel’s logistics. Those who refused were often met with threats or violence. As a result, many police officers felt they had little choice but to comply with the cartel's demands.

==== Systemic corruption ====
The systemic nature of corruption during this era extended beyond individual officers to higher levels of law enforcement and government. Several high-ranking officials were implicated in corruption scandals, highlighting the widespread reach of Escobar's influence. This systemic corruption severely undermined the effectiveness of law enforcement efforts to combat drug trafficking and contributed to the instability and violence that plagued Colombia during this period.

==== Efforts to combat corruption ====
The Colombian government, with assistance from international partners, made concerted efforts to combat police corruption and the influence of drug cartels. These efforts included purging corrupt officers, implementing stricter accountability measures, and enhancing training programs to instill ethical standards. Despite these efforts, the pervasive corruption fostered by Escobar’s cartel left a lasting impact on Colombian law enforcement and highlighted the challenges of addressing organized crime in a context of widespread corruption.

=== Late 1990s improvement drive ===
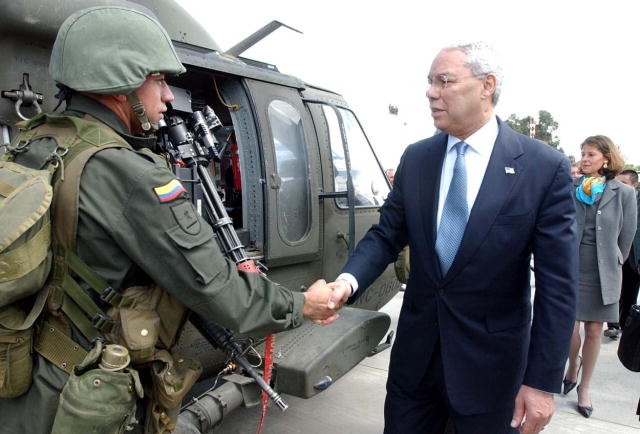
Former U.S. Secretary of State Colin Powell during a visit to Colombia greeted by a Colombian National Police patroller.

During successive weak presidencies, some Colombian National Police members were accused of being involved in many corruption cases, including guerrilla collaboration; paramilitarism and the cleansing of the leftist Patriotic Union Party, among other cases; and the corruption generated by the drug cartels' illegal money or other criminal activities. The CNP became untrusted by the general population of Colombia and the country was facing an intense conflict or a full scale civil war.

To prevent this situation the institution began a process of change focusing on reinvigorating the values and principles of the institution, mostly led by General Rosso Jose Serrano. Colombia's problems were demanding a strong government with strong institutions to face the numerous violations to the constitution and the population in general. The first steps towards this path was the relegation of bad policemen inside the force and targeting the major criminal organizations. The institution also focused on providing better benefits for the policemen and their families; and a particular effort to restore the trust of the community for the police force, emphasizing preventing crime, educating the population and the policemen on cordial relationships, neighborhood watch, cooperation, and community development.

Since 1995 the National Police has begun to change norms, structures, and standard operating procedures, essentially on policemen's judgment toward accomplishing missions and encouraging those who are willing to work with selfless service, integrity, leadership, and a vision of improving the population in general.

The National Police continues to have some corruption and human rights problems but the improvement has been considerable, including the education of personnel in other countries' law enforcement institutions and educational institutions through cooperation agreements. The institution is also highly involved in the Plan Colombia.

=== 21st century ===
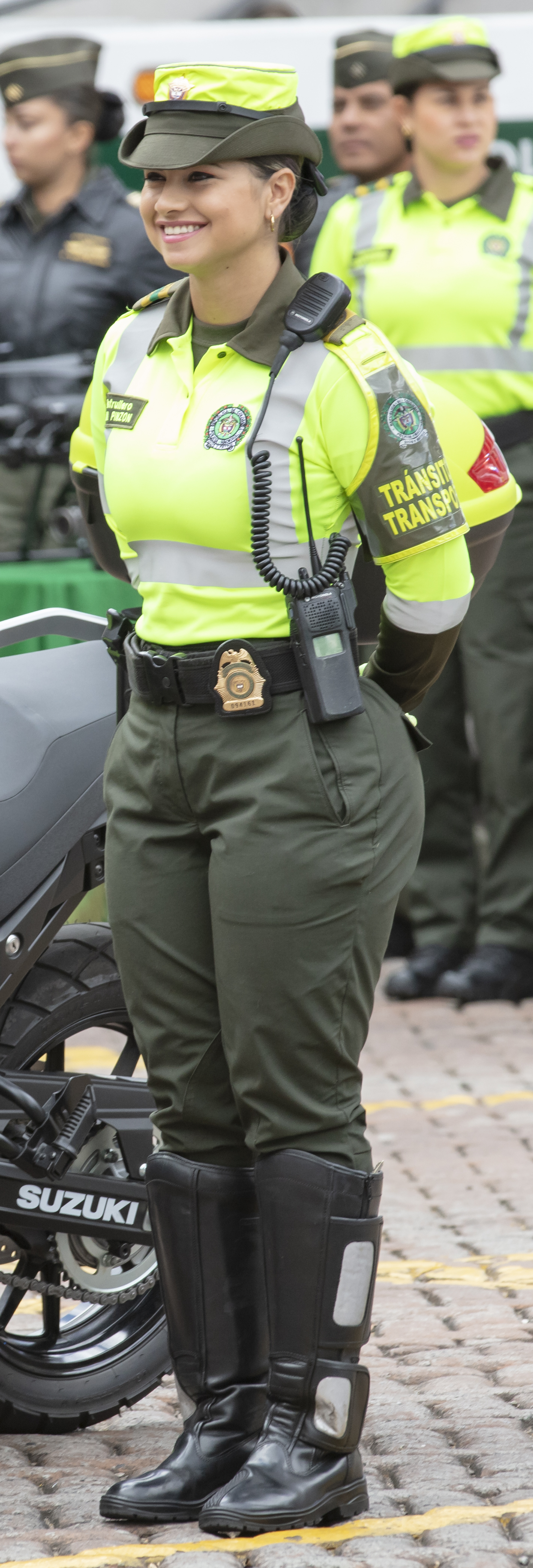
Traffic police officer, 2018.

The Colombian National Police, operating under the Ministry of Defense, is responsible for internal law enforcement in Colombia. The Migration Directorate, part of the Ministry of Foreign Affairs, manages immigration-related matters. Law enforcement investigatory responsibilities are shared between the National Police and the Attorney General’s Corps of Technical Investigators. While the army primarily focuses on defending the country against external threats, it also provides logistical support and security for criminal investigations in high-conflict or remote areas. Civilian authorities generally maintain effective control over security forces, though there have been reports of abuses by security force members.

In September 2020, the National Police contracted the development of XCrime, an artificial-intelligence platform designed to analyze crime data and support decisions about police deployment. In the second half of 2025, the system began to be referred to as IAPOL (Inteligencia Artificial Aplicada al Servicio de Policía). The system uses historical police data to produce crime heat maps and recommendations for patrol planning.

==== 2007 wiretapping scandal ====
In May 2007, Revista Semana released transcripts of illegal wiretaps of incarcerated paramilitary leaders. After admitting his knowledge of the taps, commanding general Jorge Daniel Castro was asked to resign, along with General Guillermo Chavez Ocana, the intelligence chief. General Oscar Naranjo Trujillo, a relatively junior general, was named to replace Castro. Due to police rules, Naranjo's appointment required the additional retirement of 10 senior generals.

Ongoing controversies

Recent developments in Colombia have highlighted ongoing challenges, including reports of unlawful killings, torture, and arbitrary detention by security forces and armed groups. The country has experienced serious abuses related to its ongoing conflict, criminalization of libel, government corruption, and violence against marginalized groups such as Afro-Colombians and Indigenous persons, LGBTQ+ individuals, and trade unionists. Despite efforts by the government to investigate, prosecute, and punish those responsible for human rights abuses, many cases encounter prolonged delays. These cases often originate from the armed conflict dating back to the 1960s. The government also works to combat official corruption. Recent reforms have focused on improving transparency and accountability, with measures such as mandatory body cameras for officers and increased community oversight.

== Ranks ==
=== Officers ===
The Officer Corps of the Colombian National Police forms the commanding level of the institution, starting with the rank of sub-lieutenant, and ascending through lieutenant, captain, major, lieutenant colonel, colonel, brigadier general, major general, lieutenant general to the final and top grade of general. This branch is in charge of the administrative area of the institution and its public relations.

=== Executives ===
The executive branch is formed by chief officers of the Colombian National Police, who are commissioned to political appointee duties, and may or may not actually be professional police officers. In these circumstances, there is often a professional chief of police in charge of day-to-day operations.

=== Enlisted ===
This branch of the Colombian National Police is in charge of executing operations and functions under the command of the officers.

=== Auxiliary Police ===
- Auxiliar de Policía : Auxiliary Police: Military conscripts serving their compulsory military service in the National Police for (18) eighteen months, performing any other activities as a professional member of the institution. They use small arms, side-handle batons (Tonfa), and in areas of public policing or are guards of the police station, using long range weapons (rifles).
- Auxiliar de Policía Bachiller: Auxiliary Police Bachelor: Provides his compulsory military service in the National Police for (12) twelve months performing community activities, such as regulating traffic and other primary activities of police. Does not use firearms.

== Organization ==
The National Police is an armed police service that is civilian in nature, with a hierarchical structure, similar to that of the Military Forces of Colombia. The CNP is headed by the General of the National Police, who is appointed by the President of the Republic, and must be a General officer of the institution.

Because their jurisdiction is national, the police distributed in its coverage: (8) Regional Police, (5) Metropolitan Police and (34) Police Departments, including the region of Uraba.

The Directorate General (DIPON), is divided into six directorates support services (administrative), eight operational direction, a direction of educational counselors and five offices:

- Operational Level:
  - Dirección de Seguridad Ciudadana (DISEC) - Directorate for Citizens Security (DISEC)
  - Dirección de Carabineros y Seguridad - Directorate of Carabiners and Rural Security
  - Dirección de Investigación Criminal e Interpol (DICIL) - Directorate of Criminal Investigation and Interpol
  - Dirección de Inteligencia Policial (DIPOL) - Police Intelligence Directorate (DIPOL)
  - Dirección de Antinarcóticos (DIRAN) - Anti-Narcotics Directorate (DIRAN)
  - Dirección de Protección y Servicios Especiales (DIPRO) - Directorate for Protection and Special Services (DIPRO)
  - Dirección Antisecuestro y Antiextorsión - Directorate for Anti-kidnapping and Anti Extortion
  - Dirección de Tránsito y Transporte - Directorate of Traffic and Transportation
- Administrative level:
  - Dirección Administrativa y Financiera (DIRAF) - Directorate for Administration and Finance
  - Dirección de Talento Humano (DITAH) - Directorate of Human Capability
  - Dirección de Sanidad (DISAN) - Directorate of Health
  - Dirección de Bienestar Social (DIBIE) - Directorate of Social Welfare
  - Dirección de Incorporación (DINCO) - Directorate of Incorporation
- Advisory offices:
  - Inspección General (INSGE) - Inspector General
  - Oficina de Planeación (OFPLA) - Planning Office
  - Secretaria General (SEGEN) - Secretary General
  - Oficina de Telemática (OFITE) - Office of TeleCommunications
  - Oficina de Comunicaciones Estratégicas (COEST) - Office of Strategic Communications

=== Special Groups ===
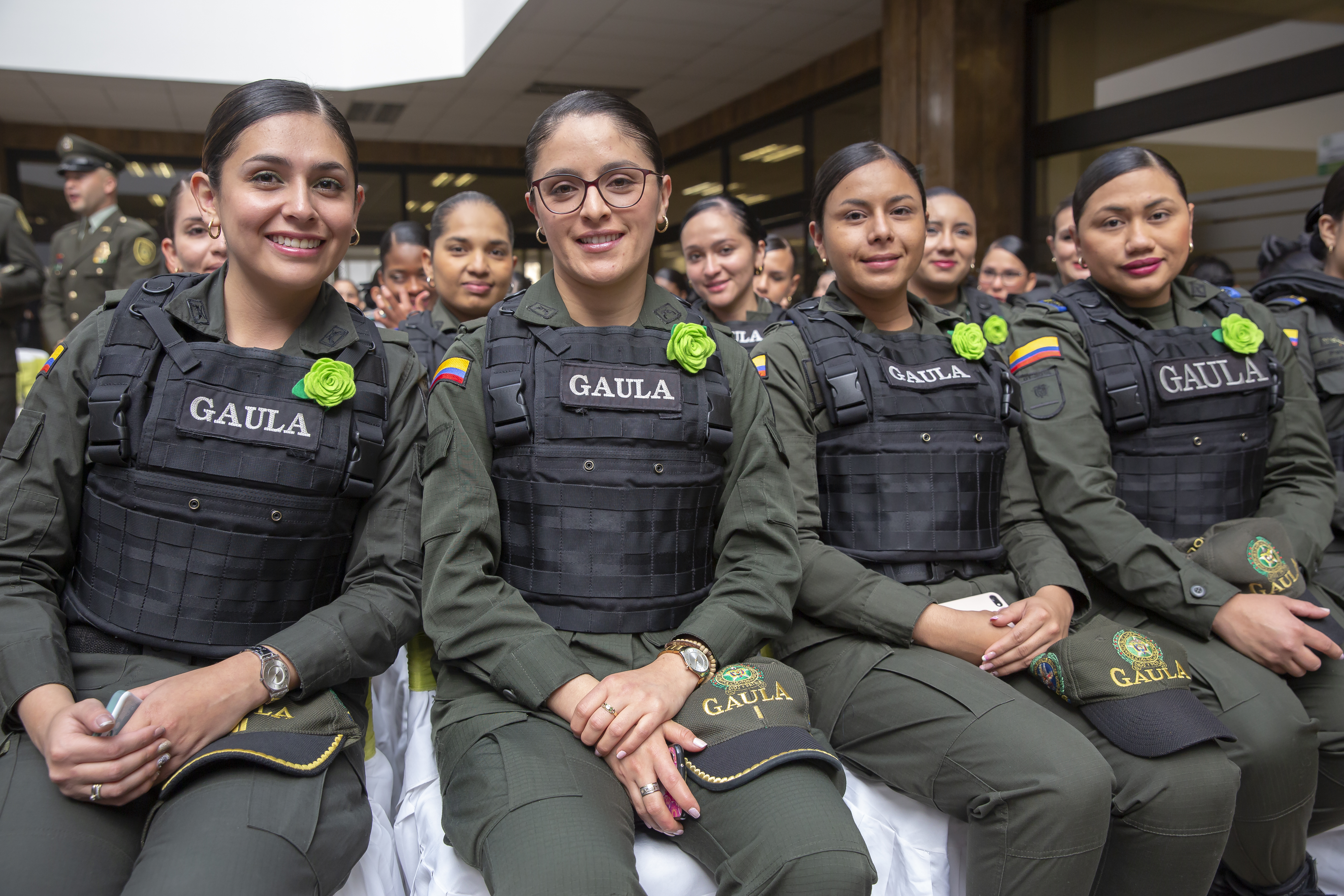
GAULA officers

The following Grupos especiales or Special Groups exist within the CNP:

- (COPES) Comando de Operaciones Especiales (Commando group)
- (GOES) Grupo de Operaciones Especiales (SWAT)
- (CORAM) Comando de Reacción Motorizada (Motorized reaction group)
- (JUNGLA) Comandos Jungla Antinarcóticos (counter narcotics)
- (CEAT) Cuerpo Especial Antiterrorista (Anti and counter terror)
- (EMCAR) Escuadrón Móvil de Carabineros (Rural vigilance)
- (ESMAD) Escuadrón Móvil Antidisturbios (Riot police)
- (GRATE) Grupo Antiterrorista (Anti terror)
- (BLAUR) Grupo Bloque Antiterrorista Urbano (Urban Anti Terror)
- (UNIR) Unidad de Intervención y Reacción (Quick reaction force)
- (FUCUR) Fuerza de Control Urbano (urban control)
- (GAULA) Grupos de Acción Unificada por la Libertad personal (Unified Action Group for Liberty) (Counter kidnap, counter extortion, and hostage rescue)

=== Regional organization ===
- Police Regions
1. Región de Policía No. 1 - Police Region 1 headquartered in Bogota
2. Región de Policía No. 2 - Police Region 2 headquartered in Neiva
3. Región de Policía No. 3 - Police Region 3 headquartered in Pereira
4. Región de Policía No. 4 - Police Region 4 headquartered in Cali
5. Región de Policía No. 5 - Police Region 5 headquartered in Cucuta
6. Región de Policía No. 6 - Police Region 6 headquartered in Medellin
7. Región de Policía No. 7 - Police Region 7 headquartered in Villavicencio
8. Región de Policía No. 8 - Police Region 8 headquartered in Barranquilla
- Policía Metropolitana - Metropolitan Police - There are 17 metropolitan police commands in Bogota, Tunja, Medellin, Cali, Barranquilla, Cartagena, Cucuta, Pereira, Bucaramanga, Santa Marta, Valle de Aburrá, Pereira, Ibagué, Neiva, Villavicencio, Pasto and Popayán. These are led by either Colonels or Brigadier Generals.
- Departamento de Policía - Departmental Police - Each of the 32 departments of Colombia have a full Departmental Police Command with a Colonel as Commanding officer, with Uraba and Magdalena Medio having their own departmental police commands bringing the total number to 34.

Both are subdivided as follows:

1. Comando Operativo de Seguridad Ciudadana - Operational command of Public Safety
2. Distrito de Policía - Police District
3. Estación de Policía - Police Station
4. Subestación de Policía - Police Substation
5. Comandos de Atención Inmediata – CAI - immediate attention Commands
6. Puesto de Policía - Police Posts

=== Schools ===
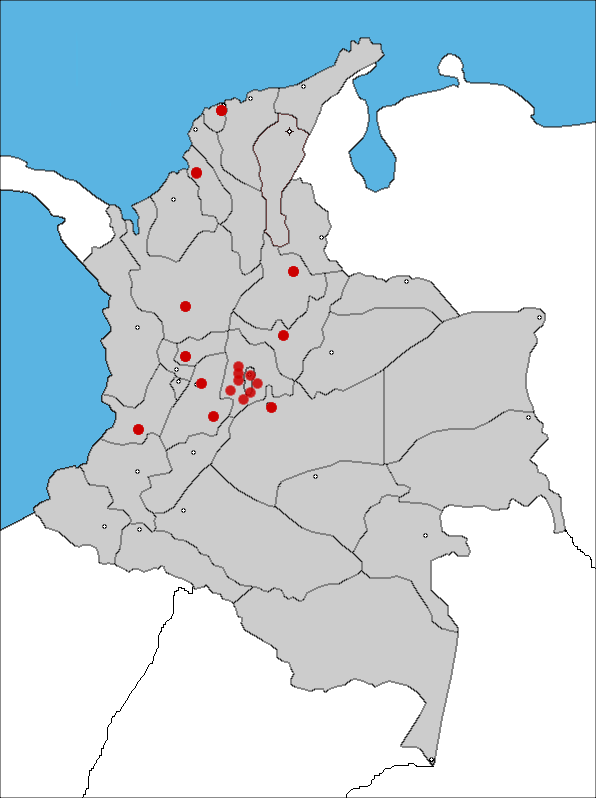
Colombian National Police School locations in Colombia.

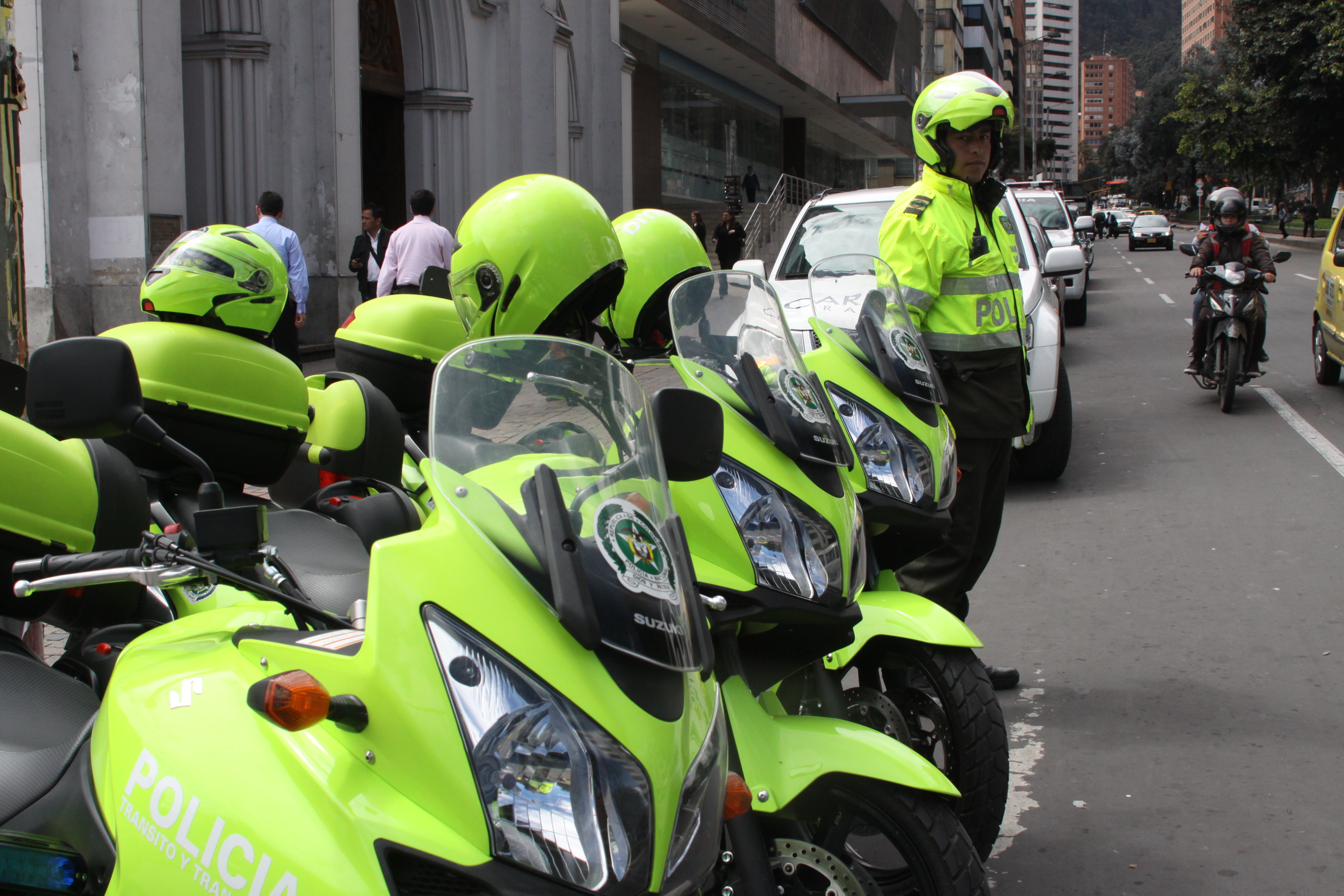
Motorcycle used by the Colombian National Police

The Colombian National Police has 18 different educational facilities throughout Colombia.

==== General Santander Academy ====
The General Santander National Police Academy is the main educational center for the Colombian National Police. The academy functions as a university for the formation of its force, focusing primarily on officers. It is located in Bogotá.

==== National Police NCO School "Gonzalo Jimenez de Quesada" ====
Based in Sibaté, Cundinamarca Department, the National Police NCO School trains all active non-commissioned personnel of the National Police in the police sciences, basic police training and proper methods in policing.

==== National Carabinier School "Alfonso Lopez Pumarejo" ====
The National Carabinier School with its campus in Facatativá in Cundinamarca trains the Colombian Carabiniers, the mounted and rural branch of the National Police dedicated towards keeping law and order in the nation's rural communities, and one of its oldest components, having been set up in 1846, 45 years before the advent of the National Police.

==== National Police Staff College ====
Stationed in Bogota, the national capital city, this institution trains all senior grade officers of the National Police in preparation for them to receive more higher responsibilities.

==== Bogota Metropolitan Police Academy "Lieutenant Colonel Julián Ernesto Guevara Castro" ====
The Bogota Metropolitan Police Academy trains all officers, executive staff and policemen for service in the capital city.

==== Sumapaz Provincial Police Academy ====
With campus in Fusagasugá, Sumapaz Province, Cundinamarca, it is one of the foremost departamental police academies of the National Police, training men and women in public security and police skills in the province and throughout the Greater Bogota area.

==== Antonio Nariño Police Academy ====
Stationed in Soledad, Atlántico, this police academy trains future non-commissioned police agents and executive staff in service in the Greater Barranquilla area.

==== National Police Air Training School ====
Located in the municipality of Mariquita, Tolima, it trains police agents, executive service staff, and officers for service in the Police Air Service.

==== National Police School of Criminal Investigation and Detection ====
Based in Bogota it is the primary center for the education of police personnel in the processes of criminal investigation.

== Equipment ==
=== Transport ===
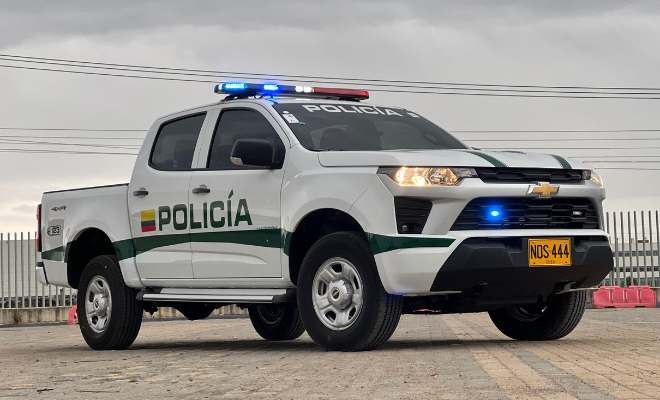
Police pickup truck

1. Armed speedboats.
2. Transport trucks.
3. Armored vehicles.
4. Riot control vehicles
5. Pick-Up Trucks for rural transport.
6. Toyota Prado and Toyota Fortuner Trucks for officers transport.
7. Vans to transport prisoners and metropolitan work.
8. Buses to transport prisoners and police officers.
9. Nissan Versa work for metropolitan and prosecution.
10. High-powered motorcycles.

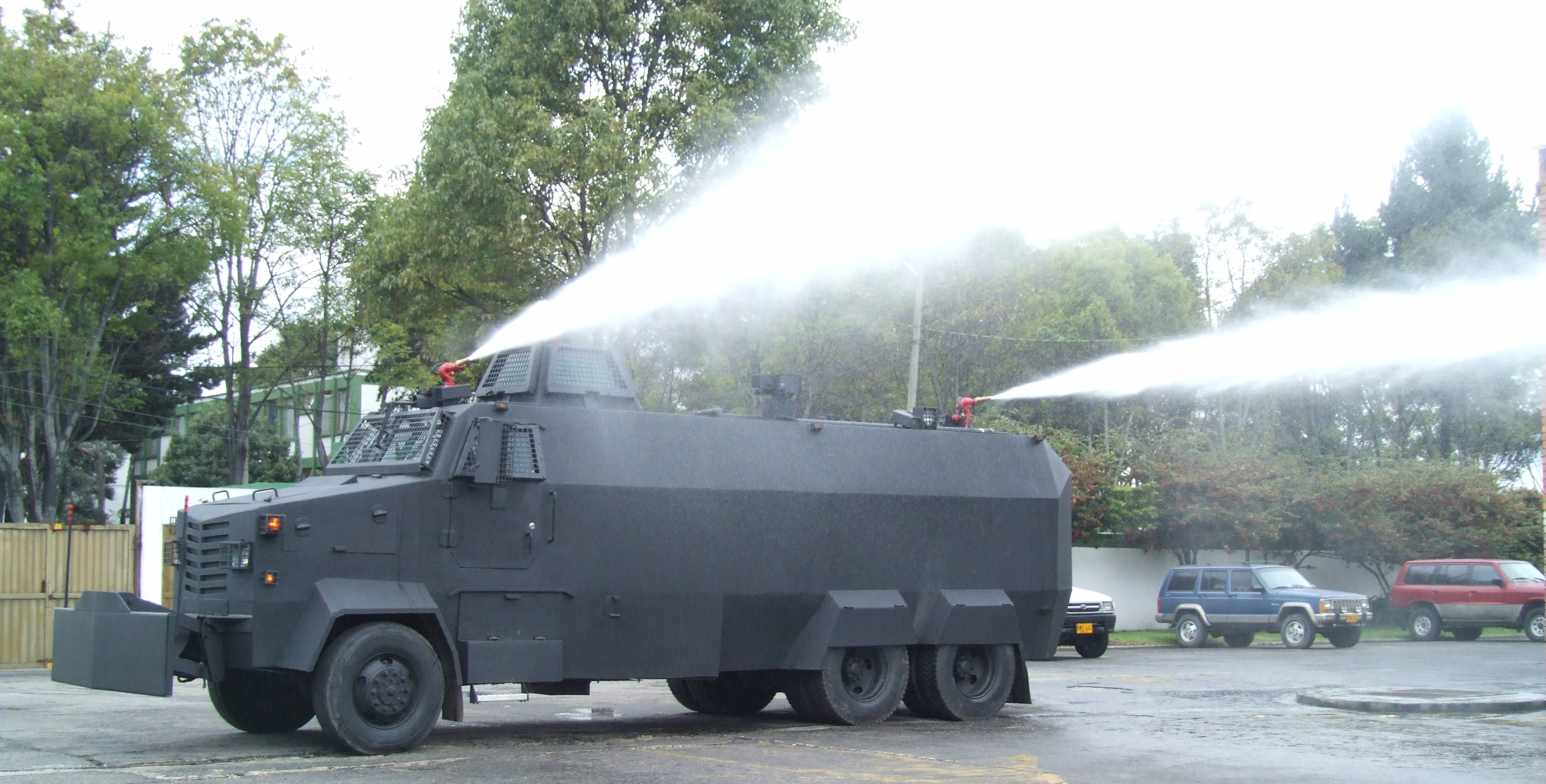
Armored Riot control vehicle with water cannon ISBI

=== Personal weapons ===
Grenade launchers:

- Mk 19 grenade launcher
- M79 Grenade Launcher
- Milkor MGL

Machine Guns:

- IMI Negev
- GAU-17
- M240 machine gun
- M249 SAW
- M60 Machine gun
- GAU-19
- M1919 Browning machine gun
- M2 Browning
- Heckler & Koch HK21
- Ultimax 100
- FN MAG
- MG 42
- Vektor SS-77

Rifles:

- M4 carbine
- M16 rifle variants M16A2, M16A3
- IMI Galil variants AR, SAR, ARM
- Galil ACE variants 21, 22, 23
- Jaguar variants 8, 13, 18
- IMI Tavor TAR-21
- IWI Tavor X95

Submachine guns:

- Uzi
- Walther MP
- HK MP5
- TDI Vector
- Micro Tavor

Handguns:

- Colt M1911
- Jericho 941
- CZ 45
- SIG Sauer P228 (M11)
- SIG Sauer Pro variants 2009 and 2022
- SIG Sauer P226
- CZ 75variant BD
- Smith & Wesson 459
- Uberti Revolvers

=== Aircraft inventory ===
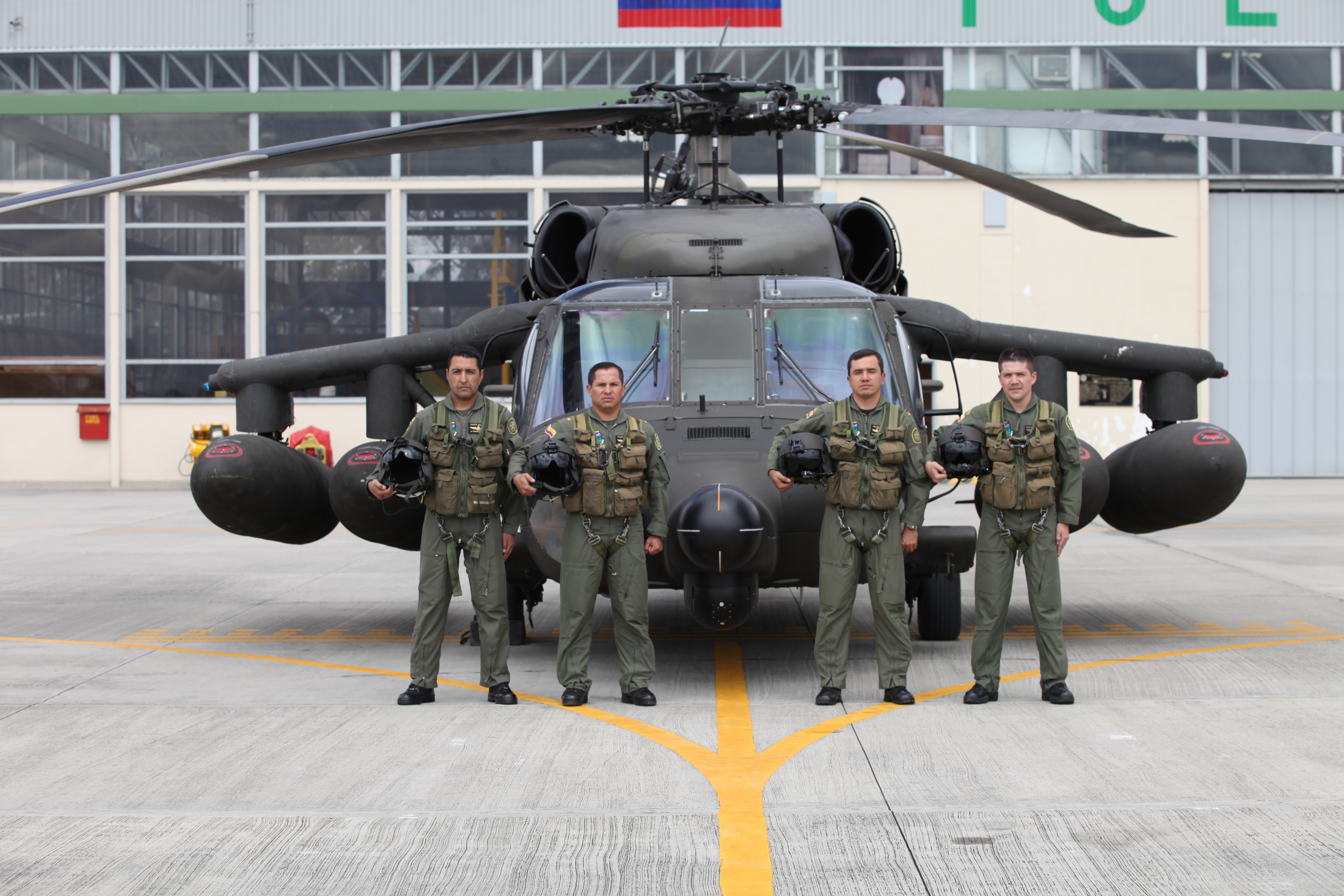
Blackhawk helicopter (with crew) of the Colombian National Police

Servicio Aéreo de Policia (SAPOL) operates 39 fixed wing aircraft and 65 helicópters

Fixed-wing

- Air Tractor AT-802
- ATR 42
- Ayres S2R-T45 Turbo Thrush
- Basler BT-67 (produced by Basler Turbo Conversions basically a retrofitted Douglas DC-3 airframe.)
- Cessna TU206G Stationair
- Beechcraft 1900D
- Beechcraft B300 King Air
- Beechcraft 200 Super King Air
- Beechcraft C99
- Bombardier Dash 8-300
- Cessna 208B Grand Caravan
- Cessna 152
- de Havilland Canada DHC-6-300 Twin Otter
- Fairchild SA227-AC Metro III
- Fairchild C-26

Helicopters

- MD Helicopters MD-530F Lifter and MD-500D
- Bell OH-58s and Bell 206B Ranger, Bell 206L Longranger
- Bell UH-1Hs, Bell 212, Bell 412
- Sikorsky UH-60 Black Hawk

Bell 407/407 GX Bell Huey II

== Historic Civil Guards now abolished ==
- Civil Guard (Colombia), created in 1902

== See also ==
- Crime in Colombia
- Cuerpo Técnico de Investigación
- Colombia Migration
