= Ranks of the Colombian National Police =

This chart represents the Colombian National Police officer rank insignia.

== Ranks ==
=== Officers ===
Rank group	General / flag officers				Senior officers			Junior officers
National Police of Colombia	None
National Police of Colombia	None	General	Mayor General	Brigadier General	Coronel	Teniente Coronel	Mayor	Capitán	Teniente	Subteniente
Abbreviation in Spanish	None	GN	MG	BG	CR	TC	MY	CT	TE	ST

=== Non-commissioned officers and enlisted ===
Rank group	Senior NCOs				Junior NCOs		Enlisted
National Police of Colombia								No insignia
National Police of Colombia	Sargento Mayor	Sargento Primero	Sargento Vice Primero	Sargento Segundo	Cabo Primero	Cabo Segundo	Dragoneante	Agente
National Police of Colombia								No insignia
National Police of Colombia	Comisario	Subcomisario	Intendente Jefe	Intendente	Subintendente	Patrullero	Dragoneante	Agente

== See also ==
- Police rank
