= List of law enforcement agencies in Germany =

Law enforcement in Germany is conducted by federal, state and municipal law enforcement agencies.

== Federal law enforcement agencies ==
=== Federal Parliament (Bundestag) ===
- Polizei beim Deutschen Bundestag (Polizei DBT): Federal Parliament Police, responsible for the protection of the premises of the Bundestag in Berlin. In order to uphold the independence of the legislative power from the executive, this police force is responsible, not to the Minister of the Interior, but to the President of the Bundestag.

=== Federal Ministry of Defence ===
- Feldjägertruppe: Military Police of the Federal Defense Force

=== Federal Ministry of Finance ===
- Bundeszollverwaltung: Federal Customs Service
  - Zollkriminalamt (ZKA): Customs Investigation Bureau
    - ZUZ (Zentrale Unterstützungsgruppe Zoll): Customs police tactical unit

=== Federal Ministry of the Interior ===
- Bundeskriminalamt (BKA): Federal Criminal Office (comparable role to the Federal Bureau of Investigation)
  - Missions Abroad and Special Operations unit (BKA ASE): Close protection detail in hazardous areas
- Bundespolizei (BPOL): Federal Police
  - Bereitschaftspolizei (BePo): Riot Police Branch of Federal Police
    - BFE (Beweissicherungs- und Festnahmeeinheit): Federal Evidence Securing and Arrests Unit
    - BFE+ (Beweissicherungs- und Festnahmeeinheit plus): Federal Evidence Securing and Arrests Unit with elevated powers
  - Federal Police Directorate 11 (Bundespolizeidirektion 11): Joint command of BPOL units with special tasks
  - Bundespolizei-Fliegerstaffel: Federal Police Air Group
  - German Federal Coast Guard ( Küstenwache des Bundes): Federal Coast Guard
  - GSG 9 (GSG 9 der Bundespolizei): police tactical unit of Federal Police
  - MFE (Mobile Fahndungseinheit): Special Unit for Covered (Individual and Technical) Surveillance
  - Polizeiliche Schutzaufgaben Ausland (PSA BPOL): Protection force for the security of German diplomatic missions

== State law enforcement agencies ==
=== Structure ===
- Landespolizei: State Police
  - Autobahnpolizei: Highway Patrol of State Police
  - Bayerische Grenzpolizei (GrePo): border police, exclusively of the state of Bavaria
  - Bereitschaftspolizei (BePo): Riot Police Branch of State Police
    - BFE (Beweissicherungs- und Festnahmeeinheit): State Police Special Detention Unit
  - Kriminalpolizei (KriPo): Detective Branch of State Police
  - MEK (Mobiles Einsatzkommando): Special Unit for Surveillance and Detention
  - Schutzpolizei (SchuPo): Uniformed Branch of State Police
  - SEK (Spezialeinsatzkommando): police tactical unit of State Police
  - Wachpolizei (WaPol): Branch of State Police for the security of state government buildings or diplomatic facilities, only in the states of Berlin and Hesse
  - Wasserschutzpolizei (WSP): River Branch of State Police
- Landeskriminalamt (LKA): ("State Criminal Office") State Bureau of Investigation, in some states subordinate to the state's police force
  - MEK (Mobiles Einsatzkommando): most LKAs employ an MEK of their own, operating independently of the regular police MEK
- Justiz: Corrections Service

=== Auxiliary state police forces ===
- Freiwilliger Polizeidienst (Voluntary Police Service): auxiliary police force in the states of Baden-Württemberg and Hesse
- Sicherheitspartner (Security Partner): auxiliary police force in the state of Brandenburg
- Sicherheitswacht (Security Watch): auxiliary police force in the states of Bavaria and Saxony

=== List of the state police forces ===
- Baden-Württemberg Police
- Bavarian State Police
- Berlin Police
- Brandenburg Police
- Bremen Police
- Hamburg Police
- Hesse State Police
- Lower Saxony Police
- Mecklenburg-Vorpommern Police
- North Rhine-Westphalia Police
- Rhineland-Palatinate Police
- Saarland Police
- Saxony Police
- Saxony-Anhalt Police
- Schleswig-Holstein Police
- Thuringia Police

== Municipal law enforcement agencies ==
=== Municipal order enforcement agencies ===
- Kommunaler Ordnungsdienst (KOD): Municipal law enforcement, different regulations by state and local laws
- Ordnungsamt (OA): "municipal order agency", most common denomination
- Städtischer Ordnungsdienst: "Municipal Enforcement Service"

=== Municipal police forces ===
- Polizeibehörde: local "Police Authority" in several states
- Gemeindevollzugsdienst (GVD): "Municipal Code Enforcement Service" in the state of Baden-Württemberg
- Kommunalpolizei or Stadtpolizei: "Community Police" or "City Police" in cities of the state of Hesse

== See also ==
- Auxiliary Police
- Freiwillige Polizei-Reserve, defunct auxiliary police service
- Freiwilliger Helfer der Grenztruppen: defunct auxiliary service in East Germany
- Freiwilliger Helfer der Volkspolizei: defunct auxiliary police force in East Germany
- Grenztruppen: defunct East German Border Troops
- Law enforcement in Germany
- Police forces of Nazi Germany
- List of law enforcement agencies
- Municipal police
- Volkspolizei - defunct East German Police
