= Auxiliaries =

Organized group supplementing the military or law enforcement

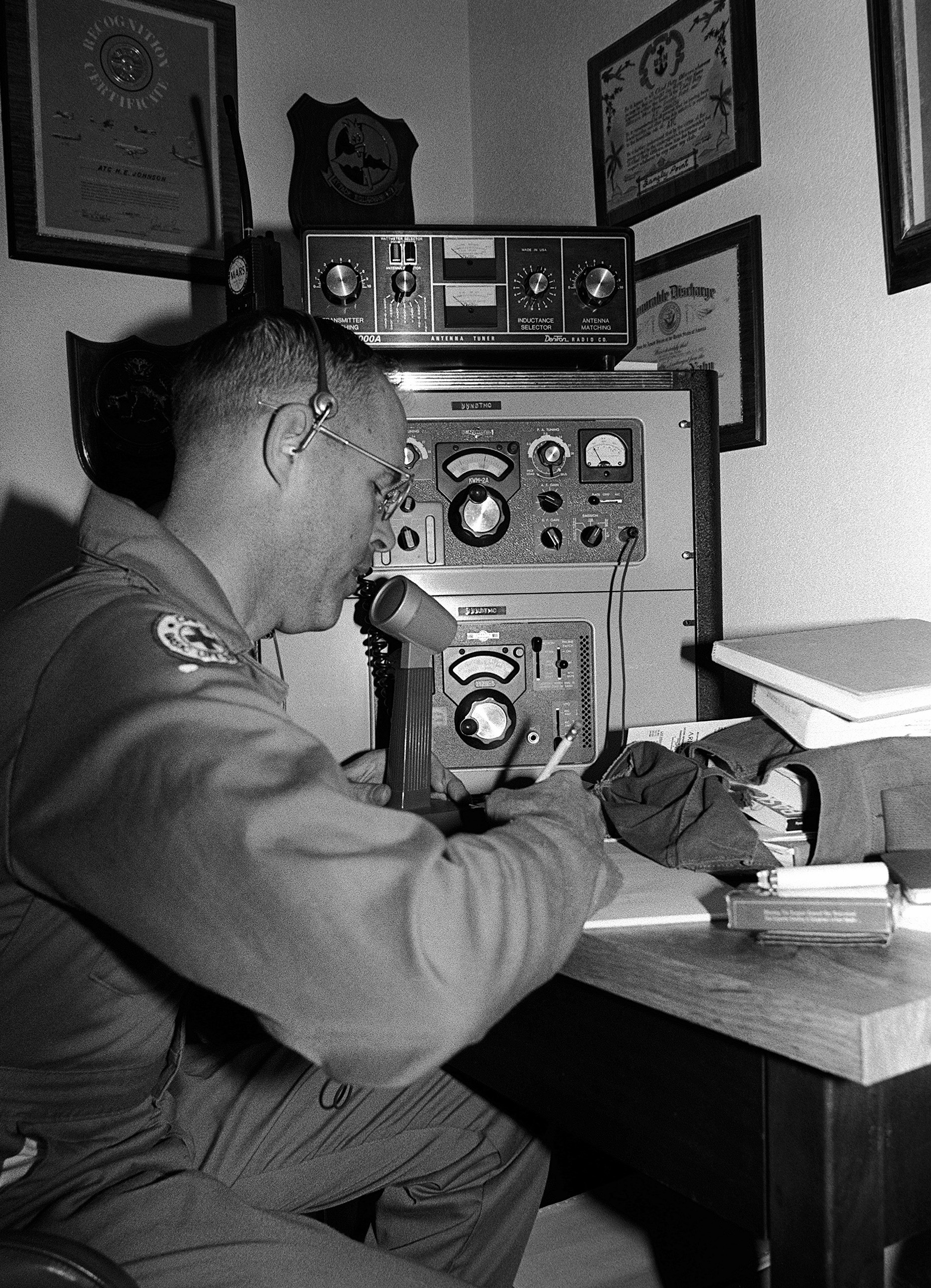
A military auxiliary radio system operator at Marine Corps Logistics Base Albany in Albany, Georgia in 1983

Auxiliaries are support personnel that assist the military or police but are organised differently from regular forces. Auxiliary may be military volunteers undertaking support functions or performing certain duties such as garrison troops, usually on a part-time basis. Unlike a military reserve force, an auxiliary force does not necessarily have the same degree of training or ranking structure as regular soldiers, and it may or may not be integrated into a fighting force. Some auxiliaries, however, are militias composed of former active duty military personnel and have better training and combat experience than their regular counterparts.

The designation "auxiliary" has also been given to foreign or allied troops in the service of a nation at war. The term originated with the Latin eponymous Auxilia relating to non-citizen infantry and cavalry serving as regular units of the Roman Empire. In the context of colonial troops, locally recruited irregulars were often described as auxiliaries.

== Historical usage ==
=== Roman auxiliaries ===
Auxiliaries in the Roman army were recruited from provincial tribal groups who did not have Roman citizenship. As the Roman army of the Republican and early Empire periods was essentially based on the heavy infantry who made up the legions, it favored the recruitment of auxiliaries that excelled in supplementary roles. These included specialists such as missile troops (e.g. Balearic slingers and Cretan archers), cavalry (recruited among peoples such as the Numidians, and the Thracians), or light infantry. Auxiliaries were not paid at the same rate as legionaries, but could earn Roman citizenship after a fixed term of service.

By the 2nd century AD the auxiliaries had been organised into permanent units, broadly grouped as Ala (cavalry), Cohors (infantry) and Cohors equitata (infantry with a cavalry element). Both cavalry alae and infantry cohors numbered between 480 and 600 men each. The mixed cohors equitata usually consisted of six centuries of foot soldiers and six squadrons of horsemen. Specialist units of slingers, scouts, archers and camel mounted detachments continued in existence as separate units with a regional recruitment basis.

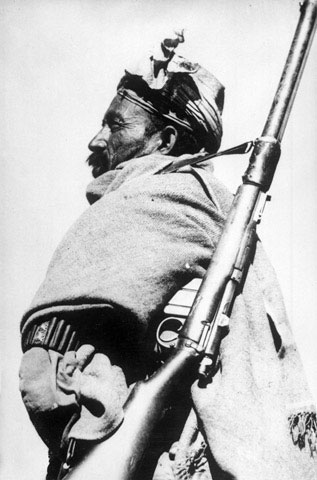
A member of the Khyber Rifles c. 1948.

=== United Kingdom and the British Empire ===
At the start of the 18th century, the English (from 1707, British) military (as distinct from naval) consisted of several regular and reserve military forces. The regular forces included district garrison artillery establishments that maintained forts and batteries, as well as field artillery, ready for war, with the batteries brought up to strength in war time by drafts from other military or naval forces, and field artillery trains formed during wartime, all of which would be absorbed into the Royal Artillery on or after its 1716 formation, and the Royal Engineers (an officer-only corps responsible for planning naval and military works in garrisons and on expedition), both of which, with the civilian-staffed stores, transport, Commissariat, and other departments were all parts of the Board of Ordnance, and the English Army (after 1707, the British Army), composed primarily of cavalry and infantry. The Horse and Foot Guards were considered parts of the British Army, though falling under the Royal Household there were differences in their command and administration. There were also other minor forces of little military significance, such as the Yeomen of the Guard.

The reserve military forces included the Honourable Artillery Company and the Militia (or Constitutional Force), which was normally an infantry-only force until the 1850s. To these would be added the mounted Yeomanry and the Volunteer Force, though the latter existed only in wartime until the 1850s. Similar reserve forces were raised throughout the British Empire. The reserve forces were auxiliary to the regular forces, and not parts of them. They were under the command of local representatives of the Crown (expressed as the Monarch, although by the 19th century the monarch had become a figurehead for the British Government, which was responsible to Parliament). In the British Isles, the reserve forces were controlled by lords lieutenant of counties until 1871, when the British Government took direct control.

In the British colonies, which refers to those administered from 1782 to 1801 by the Home Office, from 1801 to 1854 by the War and Colonial Office, from 1854 to 1966 by the Colonial Office, from 1966 to 1968 by the Commonwealth Office, from 1968 to 2020 by the Foreign and Commonwealth Office, and since 2020 by the Foreign, Commonwealth and Development Office, and not to protectorates, which fell under the purview of the Foreign Office, or to British India, which was administered by the East India Company until 1858, and thereafter by the India Office, the governors were generally appointed also as Captains-General or Commanders-in-Chief with similar powers to lords-lieutenant (in some colonies, notably Imperial fortresses such as Bermuda, the Governor was always a senior naval or military officer who also had control of units of the regular forces).

The Reserve Forces were originally for local service, embodied for home defence in times of war or emergency. During the latter half of the 19th century and the early years of the 20th century, these various military forces would be increasingly integrated with the regular force, as the British Army became when the Board of Ordnance was abolished and its military corps (by then including the Royal Artillery, Royal Engineers, and the Royal Sappers and Miners), as well as the commissariat, ordnance stores, transport, and barracks departments, were absorbed into the British Army in 1855. During the same period, the British Army Regular Reserve was created (in 1859 by Secretary of State for War Sidney Herbert, and re-organised under the Reserve Force Act 1867) and, to prevent confusion, the Reserve Forces were increasingly referred to instead as the Auxiliary Forces or the Local Forces.

Officers of the Reserve or Auxiliary Forces took precedence below British Army officers of the same rank (officers of the Yeomanry force and of the Volunteer Force similarly took precedence below officers of the Militia Force). When auxiliary units worked with Regular Forces, overall command was held by the highest-ranking officer of the Regular Forces, providing he held the same rank (or higher) as the highest-ranking officer of the Auxiliary unit. The personnel of the Auxiliary Forces were not originally subject to the Army Act, or the earlier Mutiny Acts, though by the end of the 19th century they had become subject to the act while embodied for training with regular forces or for active service.

Although remaining nominally separate forces from the British Army, the units of these forces in the British Isles became numbered sub-units (squadrons, battalions, or companies) or regular British Army corps or regiments, and ultimately were funded by the War Office, making them technically parts of the British Army. The Yeomanry and the Volunteer Force merged under the Territorial and Reserve Forces Act 1907 in 1908 to become the Territorial Force. Although still meant to be local service, this force sent drafts of volunteers to regular battalions, and then entire units, overseas during the First World War. The potential to serve overseas in wartime became a permanent part of its role after the war when it was renamed the Territorial Army, remaining nominally a separate force (or army) from the British Army until 2014 when it became the British Army Reserve. The Militia in the British Isles was replaced with the Special Reserve in 1908, which sent drafts of replacements to regular units in wartime. After the First World War, this force was allowed to lapse. In British colonies, a number of militia and volunteer units continued to exist after 1908, generally being re-organised eventually on Territorial lines (though not administered as parts of the Territorial Army, and remaining local service). Most of these units continued to be viewed as auxiliary to the British Army, rather than parts of it (as this was no longer true of such units in the British Isles, this has led to the misconception in recent decades that these units are not part of the British military as the uninformed presume British military to connote British Army, although the Combined Cadet Force and the Army Cadet Force in the United Kingdom also remain separate forces).

Today, the territorial units of the two old Imperial fortresses that remain British, Bermuda and Gibraltar, the Royal Bermuda Regiment and the Royal Gibraltar Regiment, are considered parts of the British Army, while the Royal Montserrat Defence Force and the Falkland Islands Defence Force (both being single unit entities, with the unit named as a Force), as well as the Cayman Islands Regiment and the Turks and Caicos Regiment are technically auxiliaries (this is an archaic distinction, and makes no difference to the ways they are administered or deployed).

==== British in Spain ====
The Auxiliary Legion was a British military force sent to Spain to support the Liberals and Queen Isabella II of Spain against the Carlists in the First Carlist War.

==== Boer War ====
During the Second Boer War Boer auxiliaries were employed by the British Army under the designation of "National Scouts". Recruited in significant numbers towards the end of the war from Afrikaner prisoners and defectors, they were known as hensoppers ("hands-uppers" i.e. collaborators) by their fellow Boers.

==== North-West Frontier ====
Khussadars were tribal auxiliaries employed by the British administration in regions of the North West Frontier of the British Raj. Distinguished only by armbands they provided convoy escorts as a substitute for regular troops and units of the para-military Frontier Corps.

==== Volunteers, Militia and Yeomanry ====
Prior to the creation of the Territorial Force in 1908, the term "Auxiliary Forces" was used by the British Army to collectively cover Yeomanry, Militia and Volunteers. That is to say the various part-time units maintained to act in support of the Regular Army (UK).

==== Ireland ====
The Auxiliary Division was a British paramilitary police unit raised during the Irish War of Independence 1919–1921. Recruited from former officers of the British Army who had served during World War I, the Auxiliary Division was a motorized mobile force nominally forming part of the Royal Irish Constabulary.

Cumann na mBan was the preceding organisation of the Women's Arm of the Irish Volunteers that acted as an auxiliary in the Easter Rising and the Irish War of Independence.

==== World War II ====
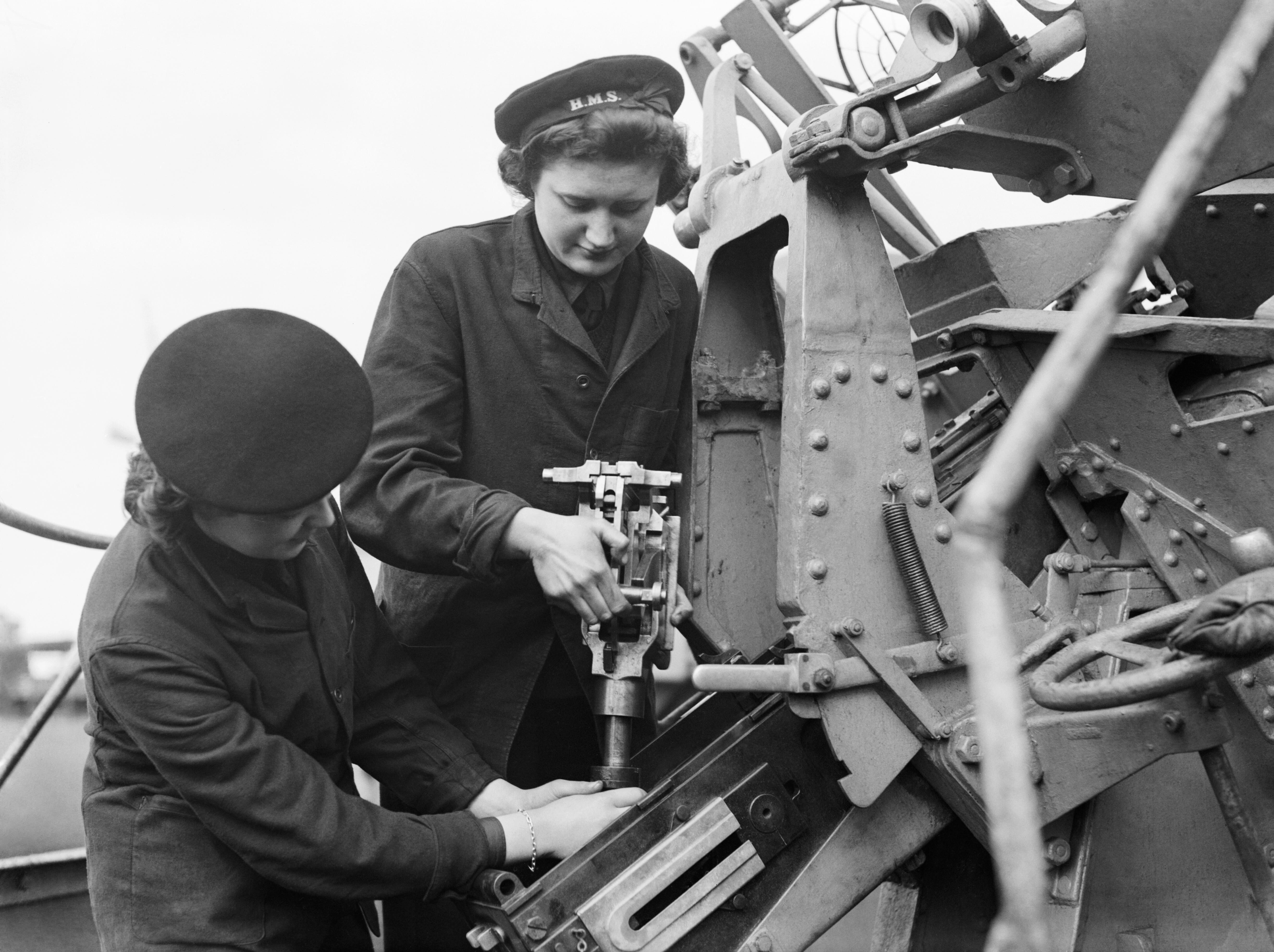
Two Ordnance Wrens in Liverpool reassemble a section of a pom-pom gun during World War II

In 1941, the British government created an organization of Auxiliary Units in southern England, capable of waging a guerilla war against occupying forces should Britain be invaded by the Nazis. Since the invasion never came, they were ultimately never used in combat. The Auxiliary Units were meant to carry out assaults on German units, along with damaging train lines and aircraft if necessary.

While working as full-time, active duty personnel, the women's services of World War II were titled as or seen as auxiliaries to the male services. These services were:

- Local Defence Volunteers, or Home Guard
- Women's Royal Naval Service
- Auxiliary Territorial Service
- Women's Auxiliary Air Force
- Air Transport Auxiliary
- Women's Home Defence
- Women's Auxiliary Service (Burma)

The Royal Auxiliary Air Force was originally an auxiliary of the Royal Air Force, when it was first conceived and formed in 1924. Today the RAuxAF acts as a military reserve; this is reflected in its more common name 'RAF Reserve'.

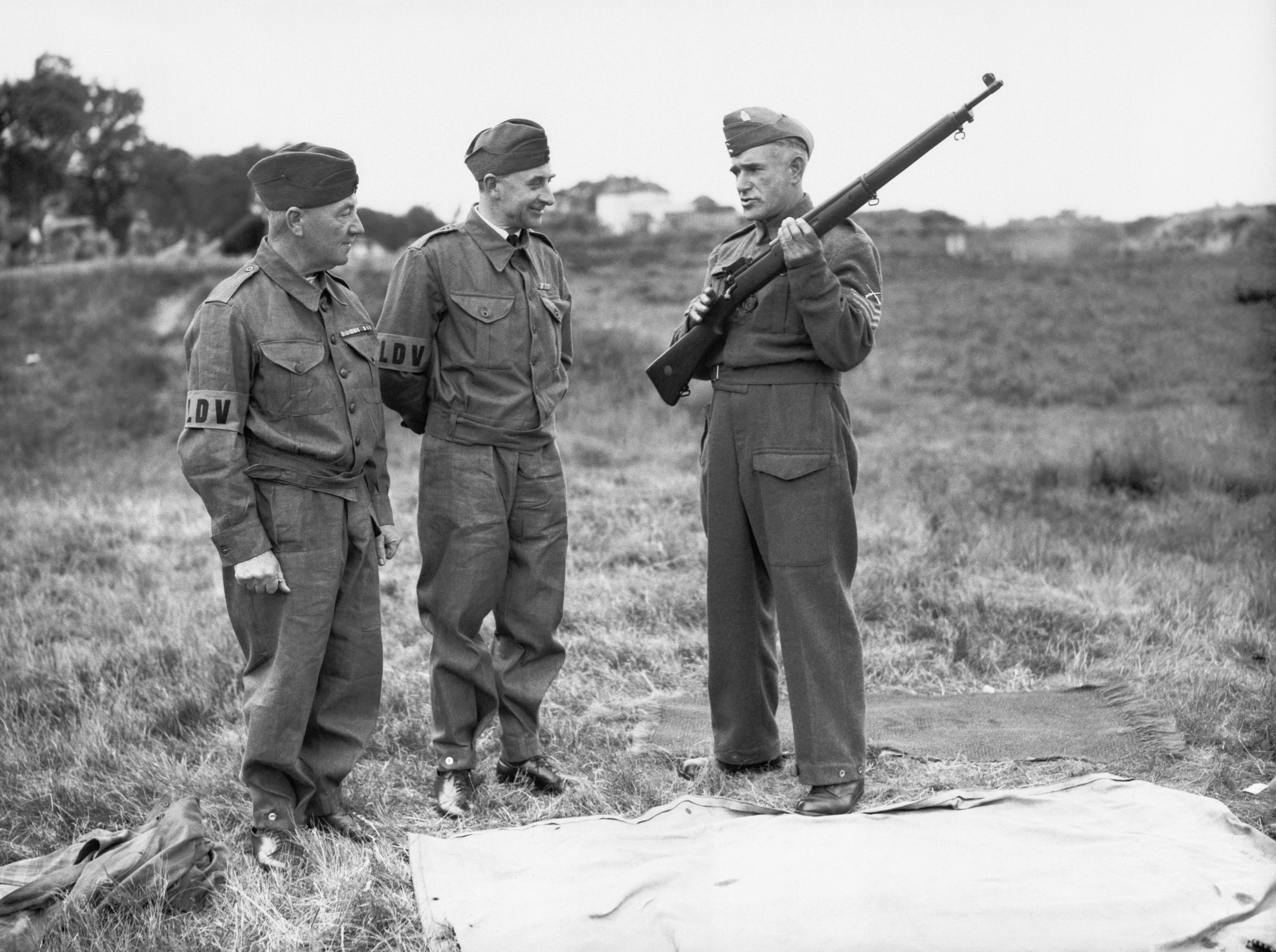
Two local defence volunteers receiving instruction on either a Pattern 1914 or M1917 Enfield rifle

Other former British military or governmental auxiliary organizations included:

- Royal Maritime Auxiliary Service a former auxiliary to the Royal Navy
- Royal Naval Auxiliary Service a former auxiliary to the Royal Navy
- Royal Naval Minewatching Service a former auxiliary to the Royal Navy
- Royal Naval Supply and Transport Service a former auxiliary to the Royal Navy
- Royal Observer Corps a former auxiliary to the Royal Air Force

==== Dominion organisations ====
Auxiliary organizations of Dominions of the British Empire:

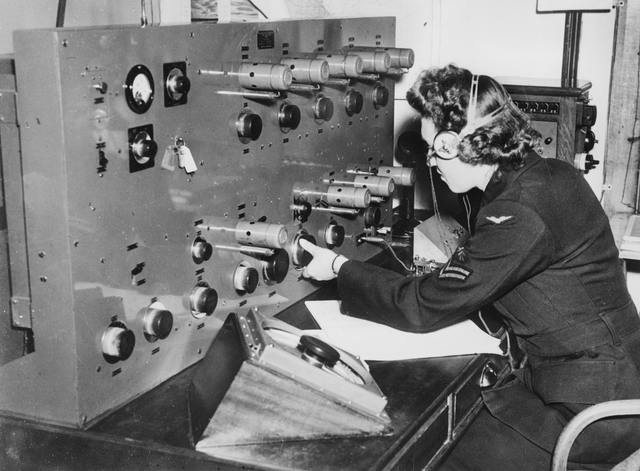
Corporal Jarratt, a WAAAF telegraphist operating Medium Frequency Direction/Finding (MFD/F) equipment at VAOC Headquarters at Victoria Barracks.

- Australia
  - Australian Women's Army Service
  - Volunteer Air Observers Corps (Australia)
  - Women's Auxiliary Australian Air Force
  - Women's Royal Australian Naval Service
- Canada
  - Aircraft Identity Corps
  - Canadian Women's Army Corps
  - Royal Canadian Air Force Women's Division
  - Women's Royal Canadian Naval Service
- Newfoundland
  - Aircraft Detection Corps Newfoundland
- New Zealand
  - New Zealand Women's Auxiliary Air Force

=== Denmark ===
- Luftmeldekorpset, a former auxiliary of the Danish Home Guard from 1952 to 2004.

=== East Germany ===
In East Germany the FH for Freiwilliger Helfer der Volkspolizei (English: "Voluntary Auxiliary of the People's Police") was an auxiliary police service from 1952 to 1990.

=== French Africa ===
France made extensive use of tribal allies (goumiers) as auxiliaries in its North African possessions. During the Algerian War of 1954–62 large numbers of Muslim auxiliaries (Harkis) were employed in support of regular French forces.

=== Germany ===
The Freiwillige Polizei-Reserve (FPR; Voluntary Police Reserve) was an auxiliary police service of the German state of Berlin. It was founded on 25 May 1961 as reaction to the emerging Combat Groups of the Working Class and should originally help out the Berlin Police in riots and to defend West Berlin in case of an attack (urban warfare and object protection). For this purpose, the police reservists were trained in the use of small arms. This auxiliary force was shut down in 2002

=== Italian Social Republic ===
- Female Auxiliary Service

=== Italian colonies ===
Between 1924 and 1941 the Italian Royal Corps of Colonial Troops employed auxiliary units of Dubats to police the frontier and desert regions of Italian Somalia.

=== Japan ===
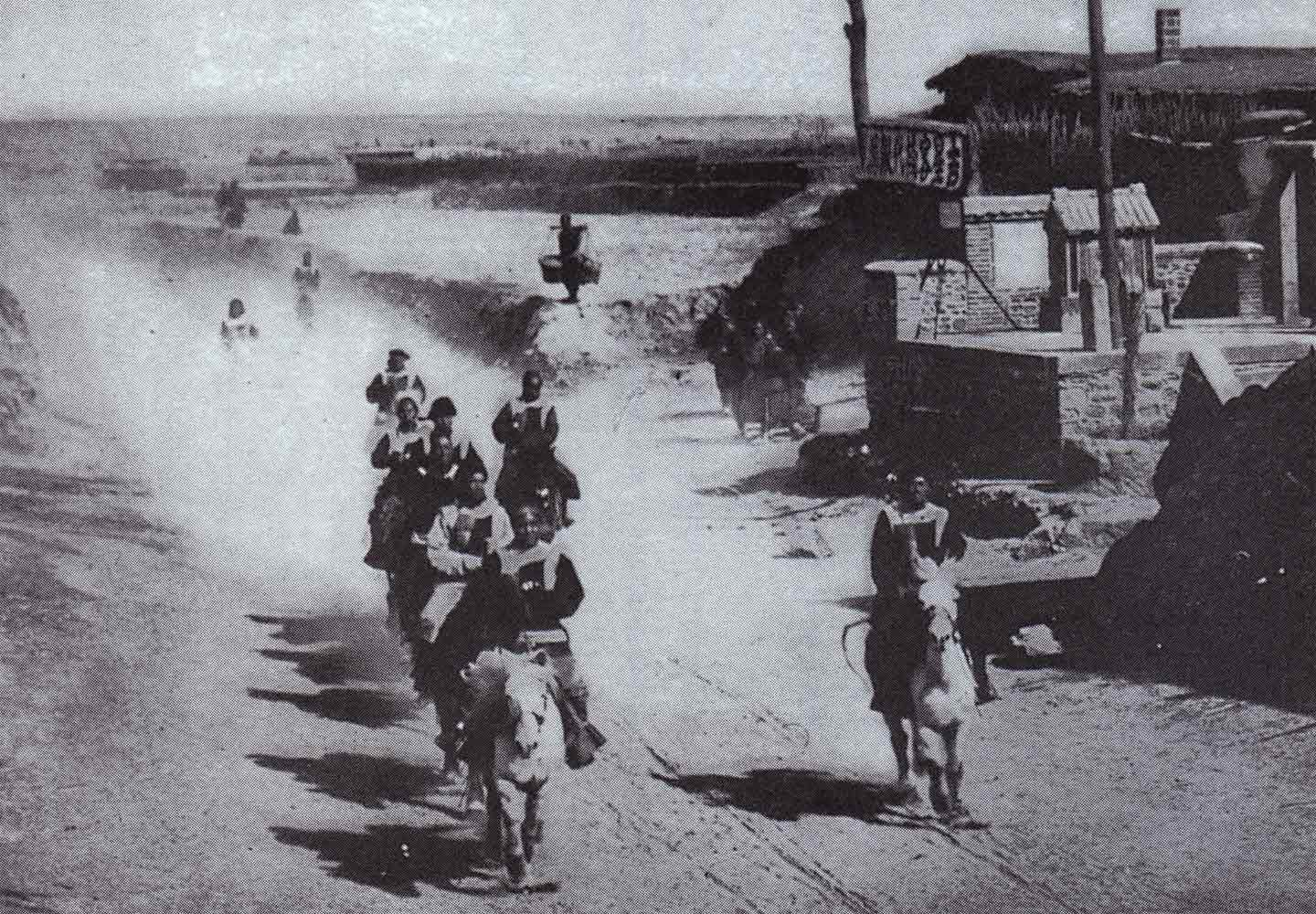
Honghuzi during the Battle of Mukden

During the Russo-Japanese War, Japan made use of Manchurian honghuzi as auxiliaries against Russian forces.

=== Nazi Germany ===
German paramilitary police forces, called Hilfspolizei or Schutzmannschaft, were raised during World War II and were the collaborationist auxiliary police battalions of locally recruited police, which were created to fight the resistance during World War II mostly in occupied Eastern European countries. Hilfspolizei refers also to German auxiliary police units. There was also a HIPO Corps in occupied Denmark. The term had also been applied to some units created in 1933 by the early Nazi government (mostly from members of SA and SS) and disbanded the same year due to international protests. Certain German auxiliary units, such as the Reserve Police Battalion 101, committed horrendous massacres of Jewish, Romani, and other targeted ethnic groups while serving with the Wehrmacht and Einstazgruppen in Eastern Europe. The example of the Reserve Police Battalion 101 came to exemplify both civilian participation in the Holocaust, as well as the active knowledge of how immoral their actions were among perpetrators of the Holocaust. Throughout their service on the Eastern Front, when ordered to execute civilians en masse, members of the Battalion were frequently given the opportunity to reject participation in the events in lieu of standing guard at the perimeter or other less violent tasks. Battalion members were frequently rotated to avoid war fatigue and their veritable psychological destruction, and when participating in the atrocities they often tried to shoot away from infants, mothers, and minors, preferring to try to shoot the elderly or the ill to ease their conscience. They would frequently turn to heavy drinking to try to quell the mental anguish caused by participation in these acts. While a minority was generally able to escape participation in the acts, most were willing volunteers, succumbing to social pressures pushed by an atmosphere of shared guilt and fervent hypermasculine nationalism.

With an increase in the amount of troops needed to serve on the frontline, women were allowed to serve as auxiliaries to the Wehrmacht, known as Wehrmachthelferin, to take over duties within Germany. The Nazis conscripted German women and girls into the auxiliaries of the Volkssturm. Correspondingly, girls as young as 14 years old were trained in the use of small arms, panzerfausts, machine guns, and hand grenades throughout the war.

Hiwis were auxiliary forces recruited from the indigenous populations in the areas of Eastern Europe first annexed by the Soviet Union and then occupied by Nazi Germany. Adolf Hitler reluctantly agreed to allow recruitment of Soviet citizens in the Rear Areas during Operation Barbarossa. In a short period of time, many of them were moved to combat units.

=== Finland ===
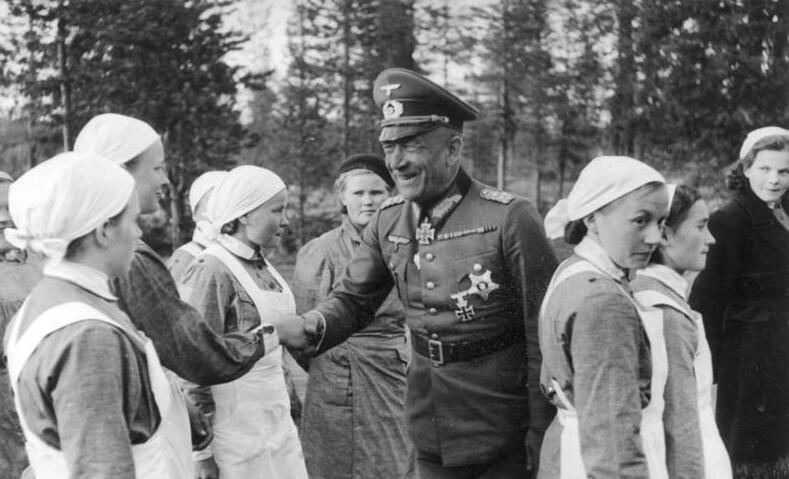
Generaloberst von Falkenhorst with the sisters of the Lotta Svärd, a Finnish voluntary auxiliary paramilitary organisation for women, in the summer of 1941 during the Continuation War

- Lotta Svärd

=== Poland ===
- Women's Auxiliary Service (Poland)

=== Rhodesia ===
- Security Force Auxiliaries

=== United States ===
Auxiliary military units in the United States have largely stemmed from the era of the Second World War, finding a place in assisting the United States Military with resupply, surveillance, aid transportation, and military intelligence. Most historical units were dissolved around the end of the war in 1944–1945, with many integrating into the command of their formerly male counterpart units.

- Women's Radio Corps (dissolved c. 1919)
- Women Airforce Service Pilots (dissolved 1944)
- Ground Observer Corps (first program dissolved 1944, second 1958)
- Women's Flying Training Detachment (dissolved after World War II)
- Women's Army Volunteer Corps (dissolved 1945)
- Women's Army Auxiliary Corps (dissolved and integrated 1978)

== Current military or governmental auxiliaries ==
=== Australia ===
- Australian Red Cross, an auxiliary to government for humanitarian aid and emergency management
- Auxiliary Police

=== Bangladesh ===
- Bangladesh Ansar
- Bangladesh National Cadet Corps

=== Canada ===
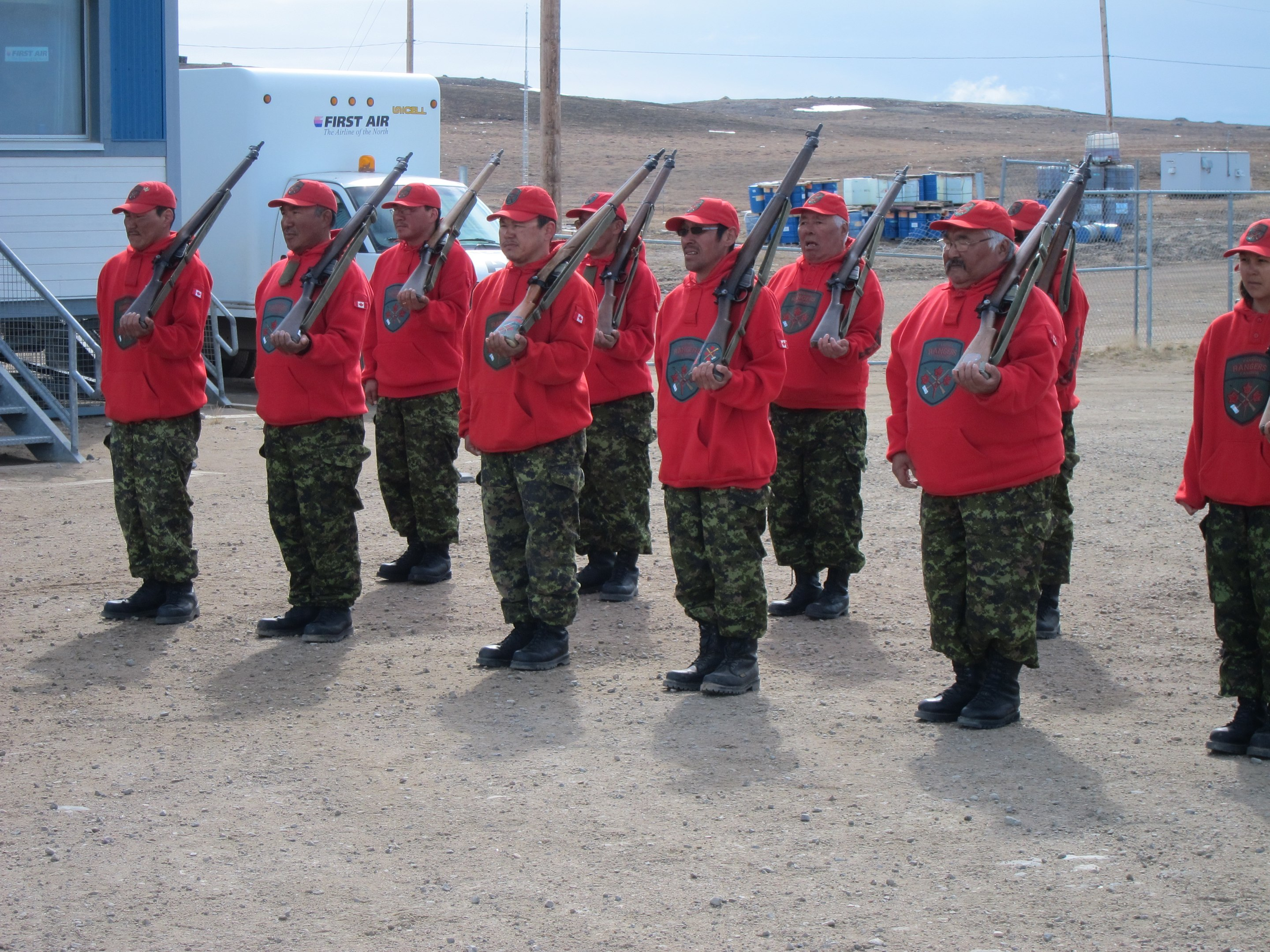
Canadian Rangers with Lee–Enfield Rifle No. 4 rifles, 2011.

- Canadian Coast Guard Auxiliary, an auxiliary to the Canadian Coast Guard
- Canadian Forces Affiliate Radio System, an auxiliary to the Canadian Armed Forces
- Canadian Rangers, an auxiliary to the Canadian Army
- Auxiliary Police

=== Germany ===
The Freiwilliger Polizeidienst are auxiliary state police services in Germany under different denominations (for example Sicherheitswacht in Bavaria and Saxony and Freiwilliger Polizeidienst in Baden-Württemberg or Hesse), operated by non-professional forces. In most states, the forces are composed of trained volunteers, acting as an assisting and reserve force to the regular police force. Due to the fact, that the voluntary police services are state-run institutions, the equipment, training and tasks differ. Through patrols, it is supposed to ensure public order and safety.

=== Hong Kong ===
- Auxiliary Medical Service, an auxiliary to the Fire Services Department, Hong Kong
- Hong Kong Auxiliary Police Force, an auxiliary to the Hong Kong Police Force

=== India ===
- National Cadet Corps (India)
- Territorial Army (India)

=== Ireland ===
- Garda Síochána Reserve

=== Iran ===
- Basij, an auxiliary to the Islamic Revolutionary Guard Corps

=== Israel ===
- Mishmar Ezrachi, an auxiliary to the Israel Police.

=== Malaysia ===
- Auxiliary Police

=== Morocco ===
- The Auxiliary Forces (Berber languages: ⵉⴷⵡⴰⵙⴻⵏ ⵉⵎⴰⵡⵡⴰⵙⴻⵏ, romanized: idwasen imawwasen; French: Forces Auxiliaires) are a security and military institution in Morocco, under the supervision of the Ministry of Interior. It has an important role in ensuring security throughout the territory of the Kingdom

=== Norway ===
- Norwegian Red Cross Search and Rescue Corps, an auxiliary to the government for SAR operations and other crisis management.
- Norske Redningshunder, an auxiliary to the government for canine SAR resources
- Norwegian People's Aid, an auxiliary to the government for SAR operations and other crisis management.

=== Philippines ===
- Philippine Coast Guard Auxiliary, an auxiliary of the Philippine Coast Guard

=== Russia ===
- Voluntary People's Druzhina, an auxiliary of the Moscow City Police and Saint Petersburg Police

=== Singapore ===
- Auxiliary Police and Volunteer Special Constabulary, auxiliaries of the Singapore Police Force
- SAF Volunteer Corps, an auxiliary of the Singapore Armed Forces
- Civil Defence Auxiliary Unit, an auxiliary of the Singapore Civil Defence Force

=== Sweden ===
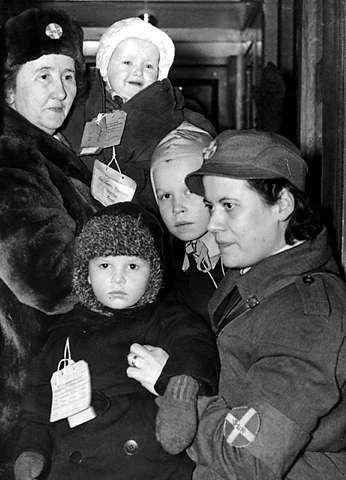
Swedish Women's Voluntary Defence Organization with Finnish war children during World War II.

- Swedish Air Force Volunteers Association (Flygvapenfrivilligas riksförbund, FVRF), an auxiliary of the Swedish Air Force
- Swedish Voluntary Flying Corps (Frivilliga flygkåren, FFK), an auxiliary of the Home Guard
- Swedish Voluntary Radio Organization (Frivilliga radioorganisationen), an auxiliary of the Home Guard
- Swedish Women's Voluntary Defence Organization (Riksförbundet Sveriges lottakårer), an auxiliary of the Home Guard
- Swedish Parachute Association (Svenska fallskärmsförbundet), an auxiliary of the Home Guard
- Swedish Auxiliary Naval Corps (Sjövärnskåren), an auxiliary of the Swedish Navy and Home Guard

=== Tanzania ===
- The Jeshi la Kujenga Taifa (JKT) of the Tanzania People's Defence Force

=== Thailand ===
- Thahan Phran, an auxiliary of the Royal Thai Army and the Royal Thai Marine Corps
- Volunteer Defense Corps

=== United Kingdom ===
- Royal Fleet Auxiliary of the British Royal Navy
- Royal Auxiliary Air Force, an auxiliary of the Royal Air Force
- First Aid Nursing Yeomanry auxiliary providing medical response support to Civil and Military authorities within London during a major event or incident.
- Special Constabulary, auxiliary police to various Police Services in the UK.

=== United States ===
==== Federal Government ====
- Civil Air Patrol, the auxiliary of the United States Air Force.
- Marine Corps Cyber Auxiliary, an auxiliary of the United States Marine Corps.
- Military Auxiliary Radio System, a civilian auxiliary of the United States Armed Services.
- United States Coast Guard Auxiliary, the uniformed auxiliary of the United States Coast Guard.
- United States Merchant Marine, an auxiliary of the United States Navy

==== State Government ====
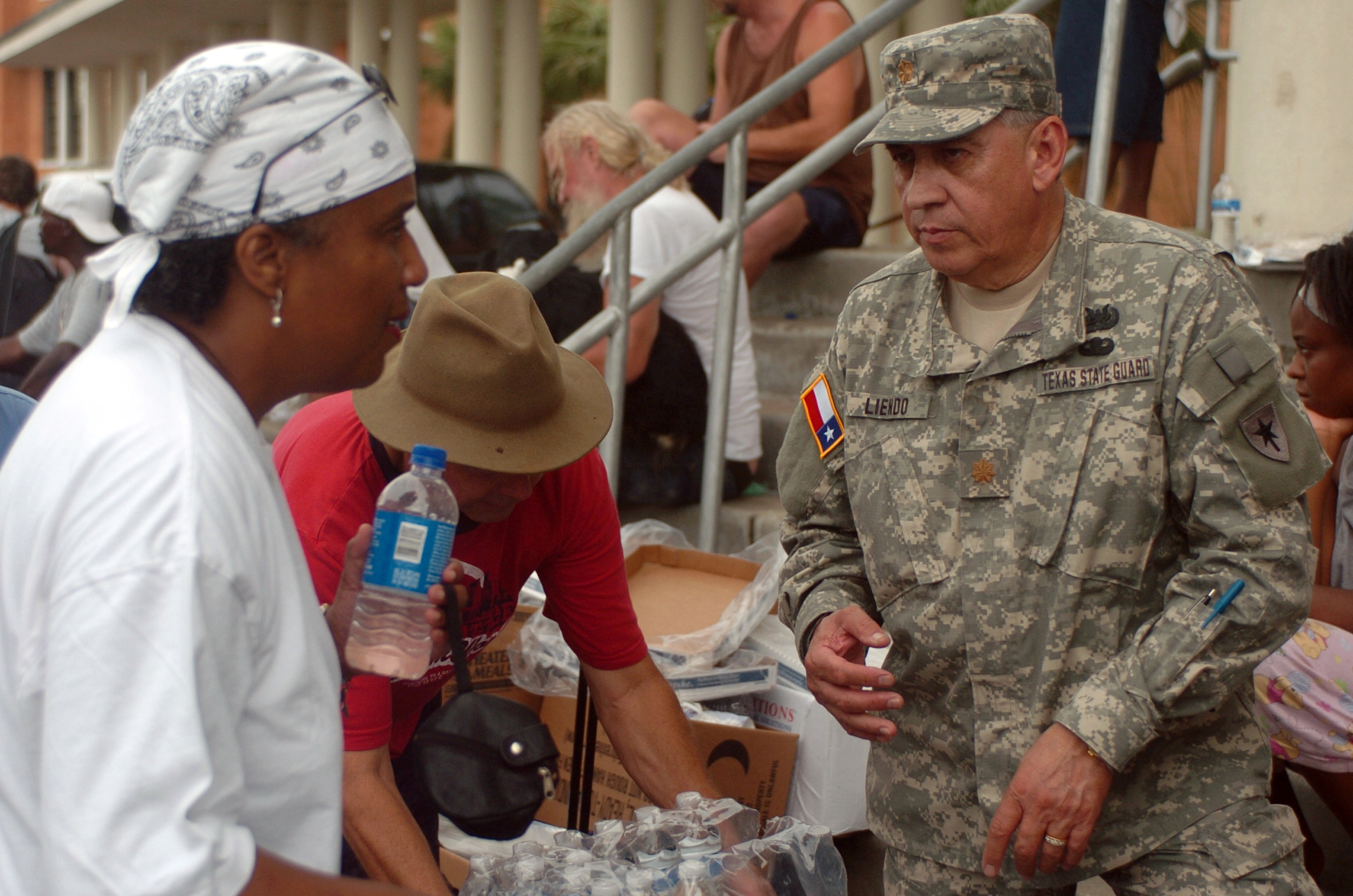
The Texas State Guard Medical Brigade deployed in Galveston, Texas.

- Colorado Rangers provides auxiliary police services within the state of Colorado.
- Connecticut Auxiliary State Police provides auxiliary police services within the state of Connecticut.
- Florida Highway Patrol Auxiliary provides auxiliary police services within the state of Florida.
- Indiana Law Enforcement Academy provides training for members to serve as auxiliary police officer throughout the state of Indiana.
- Ohio State Highway Patrol Auxiliary provides auxiliary police services within the state of Ohio.
- New Hampshire State Police Auxiliary Troopers provide auxiliary police services within the state of New Hampshire.
- New Mexico Mounted Patrol provide auxiliary police services within the state of New Mexico.
- Penn State University Student Auxiliary Officers provide auxiliary police services to Penn State University.
- State defense forces, auxiliaries of the National Guard units of their respective states.
- Vermont State Police Auxiliary provides auxiliary police services within the state of Vermont.

==== Local Government ====
- Fair Lawn Auxiliary Police provides auxiliary police services for Fair Lawn, New Jersey.
- Los Angeles County Sheriff's Department Reserves provide auxiliary police services for Los Angeles, California.
- New York City Police Department Auxiliary Police provides auxiliary police services for New York City.

== See also ==
- Community emergency response team (CERT), a program of the US Federal Emergency Management Agency that trains emergency volunteers for many state and local agencies.
