= FHG =

FHG may refer to:

- Force Headquarters Group, a United States Marine Corps Reserve unit
- Fort Henry Guard, a Canadian military re-enactment organization
- Fragmenta Historicorum Graecorum, Karl Wilhelm Ludwig Müller's collection of fragments of the works of ancient Greek historians
- Fraunhofer Society (German: Fraunhofer-Gesellschaft), a German research company
- Free hosted gallery, a type of free web content, usual pornography
- Freiwilliger Helfer der Grenztruppen, the Voluntary Auxiliary of the Border Police of East Germany
- "Fuck Her Gently", a song by Tenacious D
- The Deutsche Bahn station abbreviation for the Haiger station, in Germany
