= Illinois Police Reserves =

Former auxiliary police agency in Chicago, Illinois

- Abbreviation: IPR, ILPR
- Formation: 1923
- Type: Auxiliary police
- Headquarters: 2735 West 71st Street; Chicago, Illinois, United States
- Captain: Peter Pohl (deceased)
- Staff: 12

The Illinois Police Reserves (IPR or ILPR) was a nonprofit auxiliary police agency headquartered in Chicago, Illinois providing policing services to suburban Chicago.

== History ==
The Illinois Police Reserves was chartered in 1923. The organization was an all-volunteer agency providing reserve officers to assist local law enforcement agencies upon their request. Reserve officers would be deployed at parades and special events.

In late 2010, an opinion by Illinois Attorney General Lisa Madigan affirmed that state law requires auxiliary police in Illinois (numbering about 1,000 auxiliary police officers and sheriff's deputies statewide) to be state-certified officers. After the opinion was issued, the Illinois Police Reserves ended training of new volunteers and its relationship with the suburb governments because its volunteers were not state-certified.

In 2014, the organization resumed recruiting and conducting its 300-hour training sessions. However, such actions were not approved by the Illinois Law Enforcement Training and Standards Board, which caught the attention of authorities "investigating non-government, legally unrecognized reserve police organizations" viewed as potentially deceptive.

The Chicago-based watchdog group Better Government Association criticized the practice of maintaining uncertified auxiliary police officers in Illinois and nationwide, writing, following a joint investigation in 2019 with WMAQ-TV: "Most of the time, this army of under-trained cops works without incident in low-risk tasks such as directing traffic or standing the rope line at parades. But the practice has also been plagued by nepotism, politics, and questionable policing." The group pointed to a number of cases of misconduct by Illinois auxiliary officers over the previous decades, including some incidents that had led to towns settling legal claims brought against them due to auxiliary officers' misconduct.

In February 2018, the agency was involuntarily dissolved by the State of Illinois. Captain Peter Pohl, the leader of the Reserves, was killed in a vehicle accident in Chicago on August 26, 2019.

== See also ==
- Illinois State Police
- San Francisco Patrol Special Police
