= Marine Corps Cyber Auxiliary =

Volunteer organization

The Marine Corps Cyber Auxiliary (MCCA) (also called the Cyber Aux) is a volunteer organization designed to attract cybersecurity experts in aiding United States Marine Corps cyberspace readiness.

== History ==
The Cyber Auxiliary was announced in April 2019 and was created by former commandant of the Marine Corps Robert Neller. Some details regarding the organization have yet to be announced as of December 2019. In June 2022, the Cyber Auxiliary had over 400 volunteers across the globe.

== Leadership ==
The Cyber Auxiliary is managed by Lt. Gen. Matthew G. Glavy, the Marine Corps Deputy Commandant for Information, who replaced Lt. Gen. Loretta Reynolds in July 2021. Master Sgt. Richard Zepeda is the Cyber Auxiliary Operations Chief.

== Role ==
The role of the Cyber Auxiliary is to "assist in simulated environments" with Marines; members are not authorized to carry out "hands-on cyber activities" (e.g. cyberwarfare or cybersecurity operations). It is intended as an effort to increase cyber readiness through the help of its highly qualified members who will help train, assist, mentor and educate Marines. Members of the Cyber Auxiliary will only be civilians or veterans, not members of the Marine Corps. However, they will serve to strengthen the Marine Corps' posture in the era of information warfare.

This effort should not be confused with the new paid employee program "Cyber Force".

== Requirements ==
The requirements for the Cyber Auxiliary do not include military grooming, uniform, or physical fitness standards. However, Cyber Auxiliary applicants must:

- be a U.S. citizen
- have 3 years of work or academic experience in the cyber industry
- an industry leader or highly regarded in their field
- enthusiastic in volunteering for the Cyber Auxiliary
- not a current U.S. Government employee
- have an honorable discharge, if prior service

== See also ==
- Auxiliaries
- Civil Air Patrol
- Military Auxiliary Radio System
- United States Coast Guard Auxiliary
- United States Merchant Marine
