= San Francisco Patrol Special Police =

Privately funded auxiliary police force in San Francisco, California

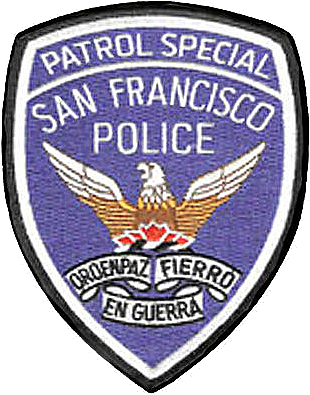
- Abbreviation: SFPSP

Agency overview
- Formed: 1847
- Dissolved: 2024
- Employees: None (2024)

Jurisdictional structure
- Operations jurisdiction: San Francisco, California, United States
- General nature: Local civilian police

Website
- San Francisco Patrol Special Police (Archived)

The San Francisco Patrol Special Police (SFPSP) was a private special police agency in San Francisco, California, United States. Per city code, the SFPSP patrolled the streets of San Francisco and fixed locations and also provided a range of other safety services as requested by private clients. The SFPSP is authorized in the San Francisco City Charter, but was not part of the San Francisco Police Department (SFPD).

The SFPSP was one of the oldest law enforcement agencies in the United States, having been founded in 1847 shortly before the California Gold Rush. The SFPSP was credited for the first modern U.S. adaption of the community policing concept.

The SFPSP employed non-sworn private patrol officers, appointed and regulated by the San Francisco Police Commission after an initial background review by the SFPD. As of 2024, there are no longer any active Patrol Specials, with the retirement of the last Patrol Special on February 29, 2024.

== Services ==
The SFPSP was contracted by private clients to provide a variety of services, including unlocking or securing doors to a business, conducting checks of residences or businesses, securing perimeters at burglar alarms, providing physical security, and security consultations. Patrol Specials concentrated on order maintenance, rapid response, and early intervention in quality-of-life matters. Their goal was to prevent disturbances from becoming expensive and serious crimes, and to relieve pressure on the public police.

Since 1994, Patrol Specials had operated with citizen's arrest powers. They had access to SFPD radio feeds and were provided instruction in classrooms and on a shooting range, according to standards set by the Police Chief. Patrol Specials were not SFPD employees, nor did they earn city benefits or pensions; however, courts could have considered them as employees for specified purposes such as SFPD employment records.

Patrol Specials were assigned to patrol a district in a neighborhood. Patrol Specials were required, by tradition and practice, to respect the tenor and character of the neighborhood they were assigned to. They often attended merchant and resident meetings to listen to concerns or offer advice. Patrol Specials were intended to become trusted and valued members of neighborhoods, interacting with residents and business owners.

SFPSP clients included merchants, professionals, homeowners' associations, residents, street fair organizers, non-profit organizations, and occasionally, government agencies which outsourced security. The typical hourly rate in 2010 for patrols averaged $50–60, including a patrol car. Additional services or more intense policing could entail additional costs.

SFPSP clients and the public were protected from negligent or intentional harm, because rules governing the program required each beat owner to carry liability insurance that protected against negligence or injury by an officer. In addition, rules required each beat owner to carry workers' compensation insurance for employees. Each beat owner would determine if they would fund a health and/or retirement plan for Assistant Patrol Special Police Officers.

The SFPSP had its own professional association. The force also had a professional support group, Special Neighborhood Policing, which operates a community outreach website.

== History ==
The SFPSP was established as a citizen- and merchant-sponsored neighborhood police force in 1847, two years before the city established the SFPD, with the swearing-in of two police constables. In 1851, the city increased the force to 50 sworn officers. In 1857, the SFPSP was formalized in the City Charter. Presently, Section 4.127 of the City Charter governs the Patrol Special Police.

SFPSP and SFPD officers have historically cooperated in emergencies. Patrol Specials were called upon to assist SFPD officers during earthquakes such as the 1989 Loma Prieta earthquake. However, in 1994, with backing from the SFPD and the Police Officers Association, the Police Commission "stripped the Patrol Specials of their status as peace officers with the ability to issue citations and book their own arrests." The SFPSP's numbers plummeted from approximately 250 Patrol Specials to just 18, employing fewer than two dozen assistants. "They're killing us by attrition," said Jane Warner, president of the association that represents the specials.

A fall 2009 survey of SFPSP clients, conducted by San Jose State University Associate Professor of Economics Dr. Edward P. Stringham, found that clients consistently approved of Patrol Specials, stating they felt they improved their neighborhoods and made them safer. Clients reported Patrol Specials were consistently professional and courteous, understood residential life and the neighborhood, and responded quickly and effectively to concerns that the SFPD was unlikely to address.

Logs of daily activities were introduced in 2010 on the officers' support group website, as a form of increased transparency between the SFPSP and the public.

== Appointment and program regulation ==
Patrol Special Police Officers and Assistant Officers were duly appointed by the San Francisco Police Commission, an appointed body of seven civilians which has oversight responsibility for the SFPD and SFPSP.

The Interim Rules and Procedures for Patrol Special Officers and Their Assistants ("The Rules"), promulgated by the Police Commission in December 2008, required that Patrol Specials pass an initial background check conducted by the SFPD. Officers receive 24 hours of annual training in the classroom and twice on the range according to standards determined by the Police Chief. Before going on patrol, Patrol Specials checked in with the duty watch commander in their police district.

The Rules authorized their uniform and patch, which are distinct from that of the SFPD. Patrol Specials wore a patch on their uniform that identifies their force by name on a band at the top, as shown above. The lettering and trim of the patch was embroidered in silver thread. Officers wore a silver-toned six-point star with the words "San Francisco Patrol Special Police". A Patrol Special's uniform, firearm, baton, and patrol car were not paid for with taxpayer funds and had to be purchased privately.

== In popular culture ==
The 1992 film Kuffs, starring Christian Slater, details the fictional story of a Patrol Special who takes over his late brother's patrol district and comes into conflict with a criminal businessman. A novel written by John Lescroart, The First Law, also weaves a story line around the Patrol Specials.

== See also ==
- Security police
- Illinois Police Reserves
