= Freiwilliger Helfer der Volkspolizei =

East German auxiliary police service

The Freiwilliger Helfer der Volkspolizei (abbreviated FH) (English: "Voluntary Auxiliary of the People´s Police") was an auxiliary police service in East Germany from 1952 to 1990.

== History and purpose ==
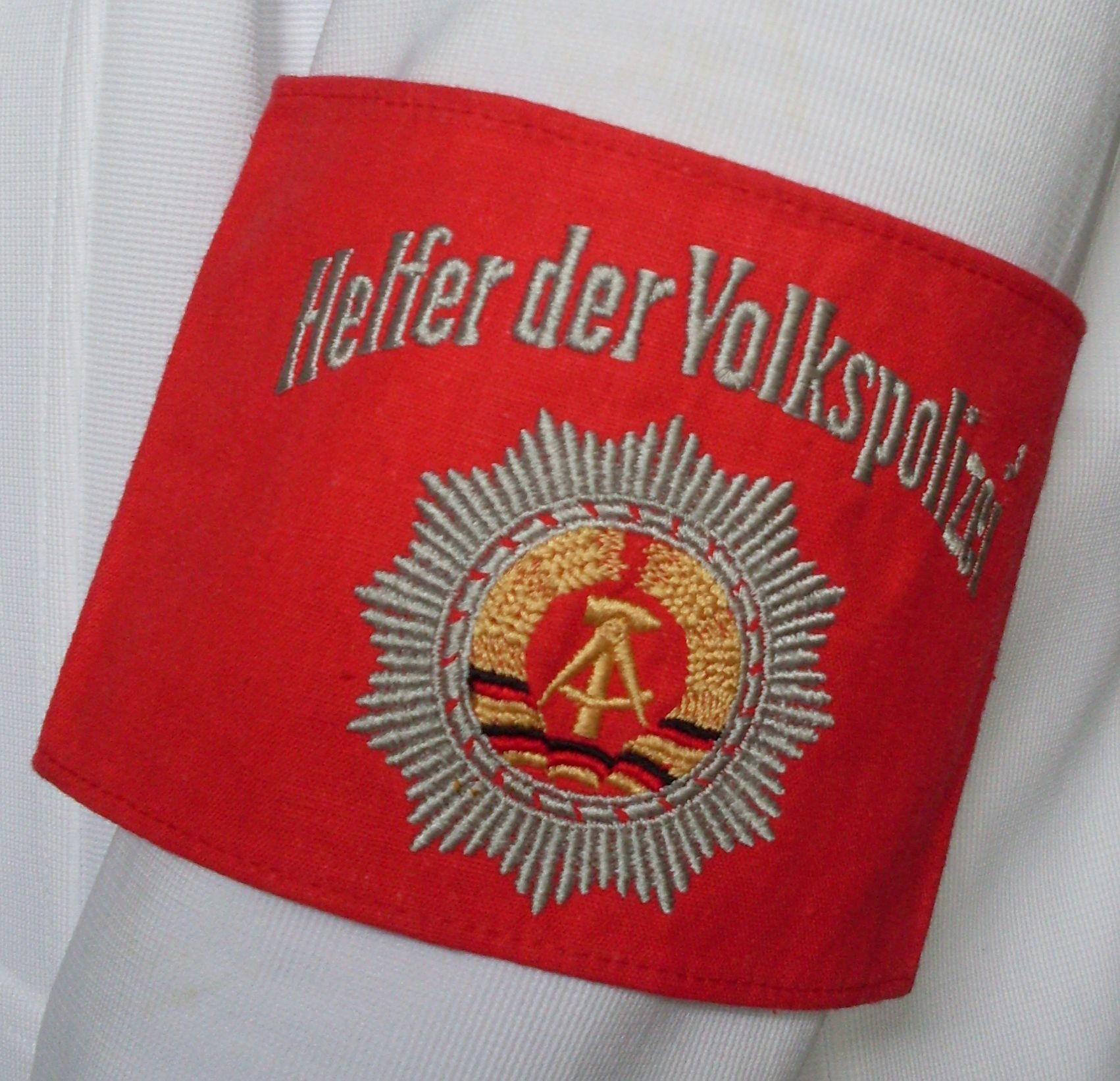
The red armband of the Voluntary Auxiliary of the Peoples´s Police

The FH was established by the East German government on 25 September 1952. Its function was to assist the Volkspolizei ("People's Police") in fighting crime and border violation and protecting public goods. The FH had the right to control traffic and were also called upon to take part in search and manhunt operations. Furthermore, there was intended to be an educational effect for the East Germans, because the FH volunteers were on patrol in residential areas and workplaces. The FH volunteers fulfilled their patrol missions in plain clothes, but were identifiable by their armband. The FH was disbanded a few days before German reunification in 1990.

== See also ==
- Auxiliary state police forces in Germany
- Auxiliary police reserve, FPR in Berlin
