= Garda Síochána Reserve =

Volunteer part-time section of the Irish police

Garda Síochána Reserve Cúltaca an Gharda Síochána
- Shield of Garda Síochána

Agency overview
- Formed: 2006

Jurisdictional structure
- Operations jurisdiction: Ireland
- Constituting instrument: Garda Síochána Act 2005
- General nature: Civilian police

Operational structure
- Parent agency: Garda Síochána

The Garda Síochána Reserve (Irish: Cúltaca an Gharda Síochána) is the volunteer part-time section of the Garda Síochána, the national police force of Ireland. It was created in 2006. The first 36 reserves graduated on 15 December 2006, at the Garda College in Templemore.

== Establishment ==
The Garda Síochána Act 2005 provides for the establishment of a Garda Reserve, consisting of approximately 1,000 people, or 10% of the regular force. Its purpose is to supplement the work of Garda Síochána's regular members.

The first 900 recruits to the Reserve were expected to be in place by September 2006. As of February 2015, 1164 Reserve members were deployed.

As of 13 October 2016, there were 789 Garda Reserve members with further training scheduled for 2017

== Function ==
The Garda Reserve is intended as a source of local security and information. The Reserve carries out duties defined by the Garda Commissioner and sanctioned by the Minister for Justice, Home Affairs and Migration.

It provides local patrols and participates in crime-prevention initiatives in local problem areas. The legal powers of its members are defined and managed at the commissioner's discretion.

Reservists have no set amount of time to work; but in order to gain the right to expenses, they must work a minimum of 208 hours per year, with a minimum tour duration of 4 hours.

Reservist duties include station duty (other than care and custody of detained persons), staffing of communications rooms, foot patrolling, static security duty, event policing, preservation of crime scenes, attendance as court witnesses, and assisting at road traffic checkpoints, collisions, fires, and other occurrences.

== Training ==
Reservists receive training in Irish law, self-defense, restraint, human rights, Garda procedures and discipline. They must work under the supervision of, and be accompanied by, regular members of the force.

Phase	Duration	Time	Venue	Type	Content
Phase I	2 days	Weekdays	Garda College	Introduction course	Garda Síochána, human rights, discipline, ethics and organisational culture
Phase II	2 weeks	Weekdays	Garda College	All-inclusive course	Expandable baton, pepper spray, Tetra radio
Phase III	2 days	Weekdays	Garda College	Course	
Phase V	1 day	Weekdays	Garda College	Attestation and graduation ceremony	

== Limited powers ==
Reserve Gardaí wear the same uniform as regular members, with the letters GR on the shoulder number to distinguish themselves as reserve members. Reservists are permitted limited access to the PULSE system. They are not deployed in plain clothes, or allowed to carry firearms.

Duties and powers assigned to reservists are commensurate with their training, and primarily involve legislation relating to road traffic, public order, drugs, theft and burglary.

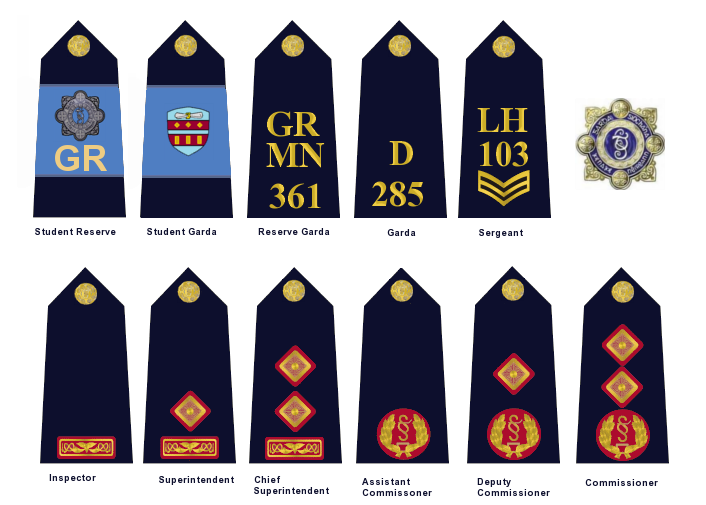
Garda Ranks

Reservists's powers are controlled and amended at the discretion of the Garda Commissioner in accordance with Section 15 of the Garda Síochána Act 2005. Since 28 May 2007, these powers have encompassed limited Road Traffic Act powers and Section 4 of the Criminal Law Act 1997.

Additional reservist powers were announced by Alan Shatter, as Minister of Justice and Equality, including powers to deal with public order offences and the seizure of vehicles in accordance with Section 41 of the Road Traffic Act 1961.

These powers were granted on a phased basis, and implemented by the end of 2012. In 2015, the Minister for Justice and Equality, Frances Fitzgerald, confirmed the introduction of these powers.

== See also ==
- Auxiliary police
- Special constable
