= Freiwilliger Polizeidienst =

Voluntary police service in Germany

The Freiwilliger Polizeidienst are voluntary police services in Germany under different denominations (for example Sicherheitswacht in Bavaria and Saxony and Freiwilliger Polizeidienst in Baden-Württemberg or Hesse), operated by non-professional forces. In most states, the forces are composed of trained volunteers, acting as an assisting and reserve force to the regular police force. Due to the fact, that the voluntary police services are state-run institutions, the equipment, training and tasks differ. Through patrols, it is supposed to ensure public order and safety.

== The Voluntary State Police Services in Germany ==
Varying according to the legislation of individual states, auxiliary police forces have been established in modern Germany. The denominations and range of authority differ between Voluntary Police Force (Freiwilliger Polizeidienst / FPD), Security Watch (Sicherheitswacht) or Security Partner (Sicherheitspartner). These police forces are intended to maintain or establish public security and order throughout their assigned territories.

At present auxiliary police services exist in the states of Baden-Württemberg, Brandenburg, Bavaria, Hesse and Saxony; each under the supervision of the responsible state police force. The establishment of a voluntary police service is the sole responsibility of each state. While the voluntary police service in Baden-Württemberg was already established in May 1963, Hesse decided to create its own auxiliary force in 2000.

Volunteering is often limited to 40 hours per month and without any salary, but the volunteer receives certain benefits. Membership is not perceived as a professional appointment but rather as fulfilling a functional role in the state-social community. In some states the volunteers in service are rated as having the same legal standing as full-time police officers.

== Baden-Württemberg ==
The Baden-Württemberg Voluntary Police Service was introduced in May 1963. On 31 December 2015, 744 citizens were volunteers. Its tasks include, as a general rule, the safeguarding and monitoring of road traffic, the safeguarding of buildings and installations, the motor vehicle service, the telecommunication service and similar technical services as well as the field service. Since the beginning of 1998, the voluntary police service has also been used in the area of municipal crime prevention.

From 2013 to 2016 the service was in liquidation, after the Green-Red coalition state government, which came into office in March 2011, had resolved its medium-term dissolution. The budget (EUR 2.2 million per year) for the voluntary police service was frozen, the recruitment process was terminated and funds released were reallocated for full-time staff. These measures were heavily criticized by the CDU opposition. The Green-Black government coalition, which came into office in 2016, wants to "create a new basis for the use of police volunteers as part of an overall concept for secure public spaces. Until then, the existing voluntary police service will be continued on the current level. "

The training lasts two weeks for basic training as well as a subsequent introductory use and takes place in a police station of the standby police or at the installation services (usually the police officers). Further training takes place individually at the respective departments (for example, districts) and collected in further training courses.

The members of the voluntary police service have the position of a police officer in the sense of the police network in Baden-Württemberg. This means that they can carry out all police measures such as security, police seizures, searches. Furthermore, they are also entitled to the exercise of the police force, including direct constraint.

They are subject to the principle of legality (prosecution) without being an investigator of the public prosecutor's office.

They carry the same police uniform with the same sleeve badge as the full-time police officers and carry essentially the same equipment, such as handcuffs, an irritant sprayer and a BOS radio. However, the now outdated Walther P5 is still run as a service weapon. On the other hand, the full-time members of the police carry the modern HK P2000. Signs of obligatory green or blue bars are provided as a grade of service sign according to the duration of the membership (one bar per five years of service). As a general rule, they carry out their duties with a full-time police officer and are entitled to carry service vehicles, for example patrol cars.

== Bavaria ==
The Bavarian Security Watch is subordinated to the Bavarian police but does not belong to it. The security watch law came into force on 31 December 1996, after a three-year pilot trial in Nuremberg, Ingolstadt and Deggendorf had proved successful. In addition to the power of the so-called "citizen's" arrest, members of the security watch have the right to interrogate persons, to question them, and to determine their personal data, should this be necessary for a crime (identity determination). In addition, they can provide space references. However, their actions can not be enforced with direct compulsion.

The ideals of the security watch are removed from terms such as the auxiliary police and the civil defense, since it was formed to prevent uncontrolled mergers. It offers citizens the opportunity to actively support the Bavarian police without working as a police officer.

The security watch is mainly used in areas where there is a risk of crime but is not so high that police officers must be on the spot all the time. It mainly works in larger residences, public facilities and facilities in which the vandalism rate is high.

As a rule, members of the security watch are on foot or by bicycle and can reach the next police station in case of suspicious or dangerous incidents. They are equipped with an irritant spraying device (CS-gas), among others.

The persons are in civilian clothes on the beat and bear on the left breast a security guard passport with photo as well as an additional light green armband with the Bavarian state coat of arms and the retroreflective inscription "Sicherheitswacht" or a dark blue blouson with retroreflektierenderderschrift and the Bavarian state coat of arms.

Meanwhile, the security watch can be used at 118 locations, In Munich, Straubing, Nuremberg, Neumarkt, Bayreuth, Regensburg, Ingolstadt, Deggendorf, Gunzburg, Amberg, Sulzbach-Rosenberg, Schwandorf, Cham and Weiden. Since 2010 the establishment of a security watch has been possible in municipalities with less than 20,000 inhabitants.

== Brandenburg ==
In Brandenburg there were established about 200 security partners along the Polish border as well as around Berlin. The legal basis is a decree of the Minister of the Interior of 11 October 1995. In contrast to the voluntary police services in the other states, in Brandenburg there is no training at all and the service is carried out unarmed. The security partners only receive a deed of the state, a jacket with the inscription Sicherheitspartner and 25, - EUR per month. Furthermore, the security partners should not intervene, but, if necessary call the police.

== Hesse ==
The Hesse Voluntary Police Service was introduced in October 2000. This was preceded by a trial phase in the cities of Marburg, Wiesbaden, Offenbach and Fulda. The voluntary police service was subsequently introduced to a considerable extent, and has now been set up in 103 cities and communities nationwide with a staff of about 750 police assistants. Municipalities must conclude a co-ordination agreement with the State of Hesse to set up a voluntary police service. The city of Frankfurt did not provide a voluntary police service until 1 January 2007. The nationwide proportion of women is about 30 percent.

The tasks of the voluntary police service in Hesse consist mainly in assistance and support. In this way, the members take on activities such as the monitoring of traffic, are present at national festivals and parades, and serve the prevention of criminal offenses and administrative offenses.

In addition to the self-defense and emergency needs, the members also have some rights to security against the Hessian police. These include the survey, the identification of identity and the possibility of issuing a place reference.

The voluntary police service is on foot. The equipment varies according to the city, usually it consists of a pepper spray for defense as well as mobile phones for communicating with the police station.

The training of the forces takes place by officials of the Hessian police and takes a period of 50 hours, it is concluded with the delivery of a certificate and a service ticket. The employees receive a compensation of up to 7.00 euros per hour.

Admission to the voluntary police service can only take place at an age between 18 and 65 years. In addition, the applicant must be fit for the health, for the liberal democratic principle, as well as a school leaving certificate or a completed teaching. In addition, the candidate may not have an entry in the police certificate and must appear appropriate to the overall personality.

Uniform: Police assistants wear the normal police uniform (with baseball caps instead of peaked caps) with the inscription and insignia "Volunteer police service".

== Saxony ==
The Saxony Security Watch was established on 1 April 1998. In 1999, the trial phase was completed and the security services were deployed nationwide. About 800 members of the security guard are on duty, of which one third are women.

As in other countries, the tasks of the security watch mainly include preventive safety strips with the aim of increasing the perceived safety. The security watch is on the road in the area of public transport, publicly accessible buildings such as shopping centers and in large residential settlements.

The members of the security watch can make use of the emergency laws. To this end, they have been given additional powers. They are authorized to interview persons and to identify their identity. In addition, the referral and the safeguarding of private rights are included in the powers.

The recognizability of the Saxon security watch is given by green or blue jackets or shirts / blouses with the inscription "Saxon Security Watch", the members of the security guard are additionally equipped with BOS radio and contribute to the defense of attacks a Pfefferspray. In addition, they can legitimate themselves by means of a service receipt. They are usually on foot on the road.

Training takes place in the responsible police departments. It covers a period of at least 50 hours and ends with a final discussion. The training effort is paid once with 154 euros. Further training is organized by the police departments to which the staff is assigned. The employee receives an expense reimbursement of 6.00 euros per hour (monthly maximum of 40 hours of use).

Just as in Hesse, admission to the security watch is only possible if it is suitable for health reasons. A recruitment is possible between 18 and 60 years, the applicant must have a school leaving certificate or a completed vocational training as well as a good leum. In addition, he must have successfully completed his education and training and must always stand up for the liberal democratic principle.

== Defunct Auxiliary Police Services ==
- Voluntary Auxiliary of the People's Police of the German Democratic Republic
- Volunteer Police Reserve (Freiwillige Polizei-Reserve, FPR) in Berlin

== See also ==
- Police community support officer in the United Kingdom
