= Freiwilliger Helfer der Grenztruppen =

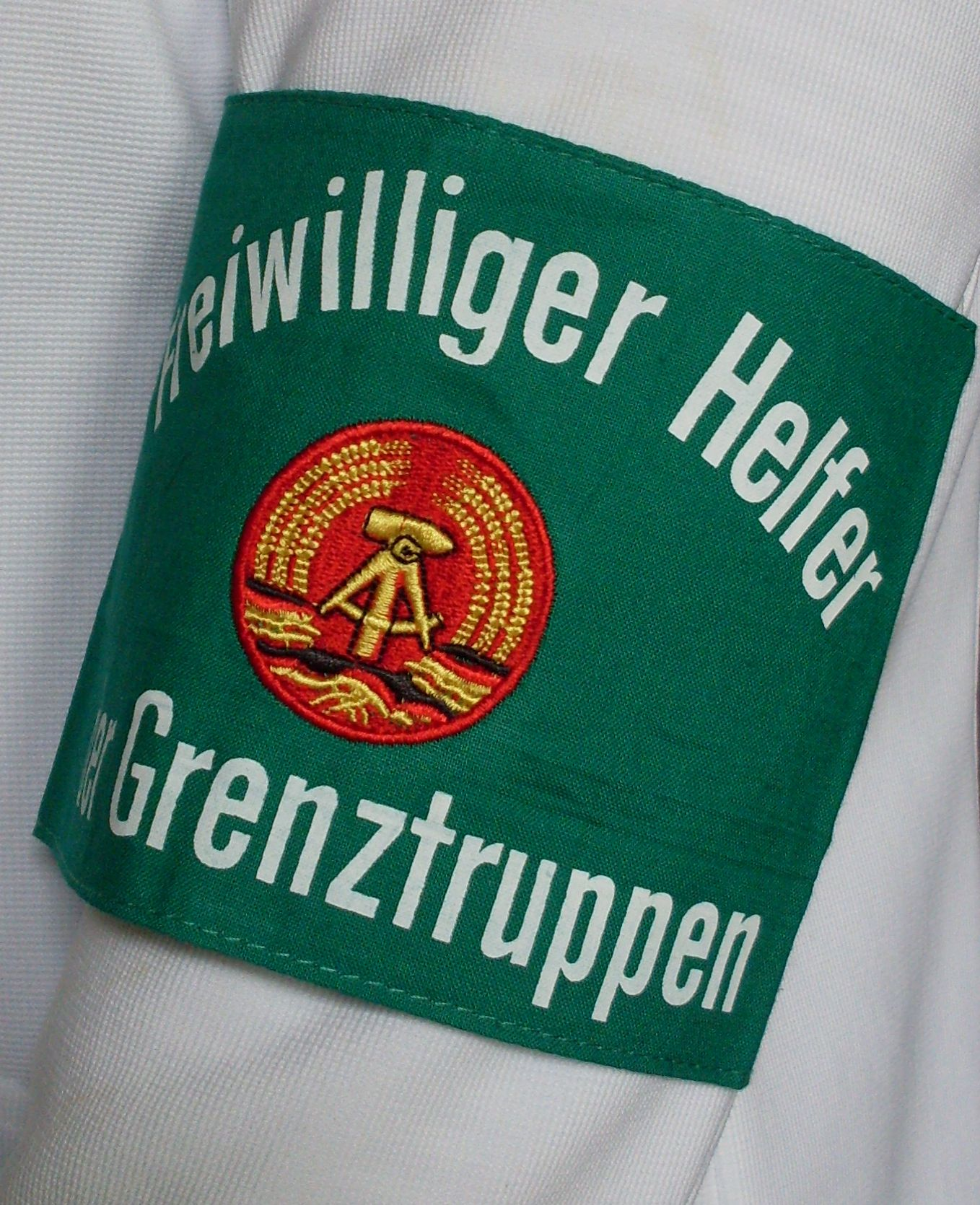
Armband of the Voluntary Auxiliary of the Border Troops

The Freiwilliger Helfer der Grenztruppen (FHG; German: "Voluntary Auxiliary of the Border Troops") was a civilian auxiliary police organisation of the Border Troops of the German Democratic Republic (East Germany) from 1958 to 1990. The official role of the FHG was in "active participation in ensuring public order and security for the protection of workers" and their assistance to the Border Troops thus made their "social contribution to the consolidation of socialism on German soil". Their primary task, however, was to detect and thwart possible escape attempts to the west. On October 2, 1990, the legal basis for this activity was suspended in the course of the German reunification.

== History of the FHG ==
The FHG was founded on 5 June 1958 as an auxiliary police organisation to support the Border Troops of the German Democratic Republic (East Germany). The 1950s saw East Germany's militarisation, including accession to the Warsaw Pact in 1955 and establishment of the National People's Army in 1956, with the escalation of the Cold War. The Inner German border became the dividing line between two opposing military blocs (NATO and Warsaw Pact) and social systems (capitalism and communism). This period also saw the tightening of the border to prevent Republikflucht (migration from East Germany to West Germany) which was of high political and economic importance to East Germany.

On 25 August 1952, the first 543 volunteers of the Border Troops were called in to secure the border, not yet under their later official name. Membership in the Warsaw Pact demanded that the East German leadership increase the protection of the Inner German border, which had been relatively open and free. Therefore, on 1 December 1955, the Border Troops took over securing the entire state border of East Germany, including the borders with the allied Poland and Czechoslovakia, as well as with West Berlin, an enclave within East Germany. As a result, the party and state authorities passed resolutions and regulations to support the border police, which did not have enough resources to cover the Onner German border nationwide. The regulations concerned both the change in the current structure and the training and equipment of the border police. However, it was foreseeable that in spite of this restructuring, the tasks could only be completely fulfilled by the help of the population of the residential areas close to the border. The state government activated all state-owned local bodies in the respective border areas and massively called on the population to help protect the state border. Compared to the Volkspolizei, which at that time already had tens of thousands of helpers, the Border Troops brought only a few thousand. However, this was enough to create the conditions for adopting the ordinance on 5 June 1958 for the approval of volunteers.

Officially, the FHG should assist the Border Troops to maintain public safety and the socialist system. Unofficially, the main target was to close off the border to West Germany, and to prevent East Germans from fleeing to West Germany. Volunteers fulfilled their patrol missions in plain clothes, but were identifiable by their armband. The FHG was defunct a few days before the German reunification in 1990.

== Duties and responsibilities ==
The FHG had the right to check ID cards, to stop cars close to the border and were also called for search and manhunt operations.

== See also ==
- Stasi
- Fortifications of the inner German border
