= Auxiliary police =

Part-time reserve police

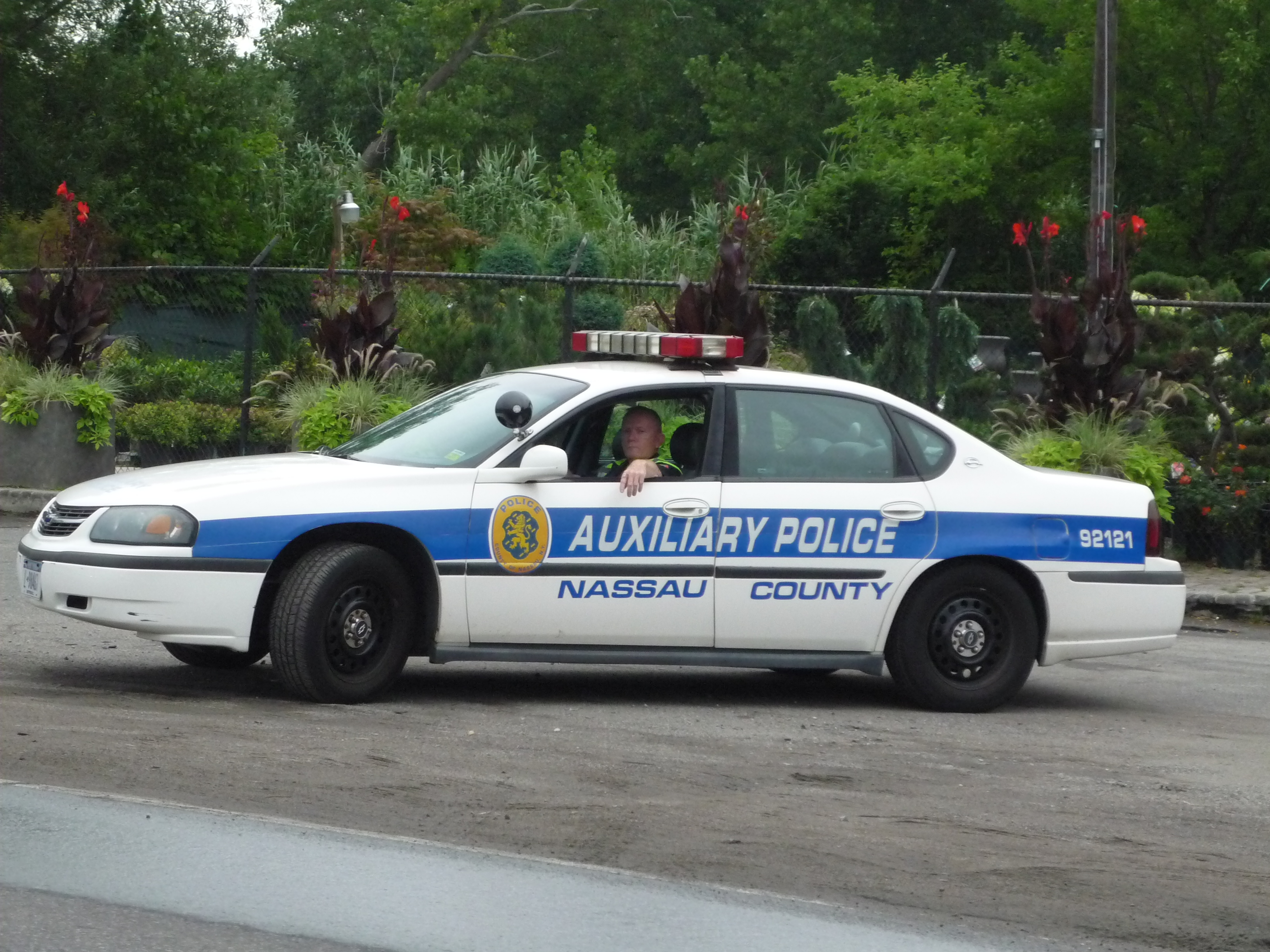
A Nassau County Police Department auxiliary in a specially-marked auxiliary police car

Auxiliary police, also called volunteer police, reserve police, assistant police, civil guards, or special police, are usually the part-time reserves of a regular police force. They may be unpaid volunteers or paid members of the police service with which they are affiliated; there is no consistent international definition.

Auxiliary police are primarily tasked with supporting and augmenting the police, but this may also extend to established emergency services such as the fire department (and in the case of fire police), emergency medical services, border guard, and coast guard. Duties commonly assigned to auxiliaries include community policing, neighborhood watch, traffic policing, civil defense, and riot control.

The police powers auxiliaries may exercise vary from agency to agency; some have no or limited authority, while others may be accorded full police powers. They may be armed or unarmed.

== Australia ==
The Australian Federal Police can appoint special members who do not have full police powers. Special members are generally recruited locally to perform regulatory and administrative duties while others perform community policing duties in locations such as Norfolk Island, Christmas Island and Jervis Bay Territory.

The Western Australia Police has had auxiliary officers since 2009. The role of police auxiliary officers was inserted into the Police Act 1892 by the Police Amendment Act 2009. They generally perform administrative and other duties which do not require full police powers.

The Northern Territory Police has auxiliary officers who can perform administrative duties and communications, plus duties which may require some expertise but do not require police powers such as search and rescue.

The Victoria Police recruited 3,100 auxiliary police to the Victoria Police Auxiliary Force during World War II to assist regular police in the event of emergencies. The Auxiliary Force was disbanded in 1946. A number of retired police were temporarily formed into a Police Reserve to assist with traffic control during the 1956 Summer Olympics. A permanent Retired Police Reserve was established under the Police Regulation Act 1958, although today is very small in number.

The New South Wales Police Force formed a Police Reserve of around 500 special constables during World War I. The Police Reserve was formed again during World War II.

== Canada ==
In Canada, many police forces utilize the services of auxiliary constables. Under various provincial policing legislations and the Royal Canadian Mounted Police Act, the role of auxiliary constable is to assist regular, or sworn, police constables in the execution of their duties, as well as to provide assistance in community policing.

Auxiliary constables in Canada wear uniforms similar to regular force constables. However, most wear the word "auxiliary" on a rocker panel under the force's crest on each arm, and in some cases, wear a red and black checkered head band on their service caps to distinguish them from full-time police. Also, auxiliary constables are usually unarmed, but are trained in firearms. They may, depending on legislation and policies, carry a baton and handcuffs while on duty.

Auxiliary officers are often called upon to assist in such things as large-scale searches for missing persons, to provide crowd control at large-scale events, and often accompany regular force police officers on daily patrols.

The Calgary Police Service discontinued their auxiliary cadet program in 2019 due to concerns that volunteers were given supplemental work, which brought about safety and working condition concerns.

== China ==
Ministry of Public Security Auxiliary Personnel (公安机关警务辅助人员), better known as Auxiliary Police (辅警) are often hired by local public security bureaus. According to the Guangdong provincial government's 2016 "Law on the management of Ministry of Public Security Auxiliary Personnel", article 5 states that they are not part of the People's Police but are instead managed by People's Police personnel.

Article 8 states that Auxiliary Duty Officers have the following duties:

1. Assisting in preventing and stopping crime
2. Assisting in patrols
3. Assisting in apprehension, investigation, monitoring and guarding suspects
4. Assisting protecting order at crime scenes along with evidence and rescuing casualties
5. Assisting in traffic enforcement and conflict negotiation
6. Assisting in monitoring drug rehabilitation and confiscation of narcotics
7. Assisting in protecting jails
8. Participating in firefighting
9. Assisting in public relations and promotion of road safety and anti-drug campaigns
10. Assisting in Police interviews
11. Driving People's police automobiles, motorcycles, vessels and aircraft
12. Other duties done by Auxiliary Duty Officers

Article 9 states that Auxiliary Civilian Employees have the following duties:

1. Organization of documents and files, receiving phone calls and other requests
2. Psychological counseling, website management, data analysis, safety tests, communications maintenance, financial analysis, non-confidential financial management and lab tests.
3. Management and repairing police equipment
4. Other duties done by auxiliary civilian employees

Article 10 states that Auxiliary Police are prohibited from the following duties:

1. Work related to national security, technical reconnaissance, Anti-Cult and anti-terrorism
2. Work related to confidential information
3. Management of evidence reports and traffic accident responsibility
4. Conducting correctional duties
5. Executive duties
6. Reviewing cases
7. Owning or using firearms or police equipment
8. Enforcing the law on their own
9. Other duties legally assigned to the People's Police

The following are not allowed to be auxiliary police, per article 17:

1. People with a criminal record are of suspected of committed a crime who has not yet been declared innocent or guilty
2. People who have been placed in jail, juvenile detention, prostitution rehabilitation or with a history of taking drugs
3. People fired by the Ministry of State Security or their government agency
4. People whose labor contract terminated due to violating law enforcement related guidlines
5. People with extremely bad credit history
6. Other criteria which would prohibit someone from police work

=== Hong Kong ===
The Hong Kong Auxiliary Police Force (HKAPF, traditional Chinese: 香港輔助警察隊), established in 1914, provides additional manpower to the Hong Kong Police Force (HKPF) during emergencies and other incidents. From 1969 to 1997, the HKAPF was known as the Royal Hong Kong Auxiliary Police Force (RHKAPF).

Auxiliary police officers are paid hourly wages and have similar duties to full-time members of the HKPF. Most are armed and, like members of the HKPF, are equipped with full gear and weapons including pepper spray, expandable batons and Smith & Wesson Model 10 revolvers as sidearms, with spare ammunition, while some are armed with Remington 870 shotguns. The HKAPF reports to the Commissioner of Police.

== Estonia ==
The Assistant Police Officer position was created in Estonia by the Assistant Police Officer Act, which was adopted by the Riigikogu on 20 April 1994. It provided the rights, duties and activities of the assistant police officer, defined by Estonian law as a person who is not a member of the Estonian Police but who voluntarily participates in police activities in the cases allowed by local laws. While taking part in police activities, the assistant police officer is a government representative.

Initially, each police officer was guided individually by a police officer to whom they were assigned (usually the region constable). Nowadays they are guided by assistant police officer formations managers, who are appointed by the chief of police.

== France ==
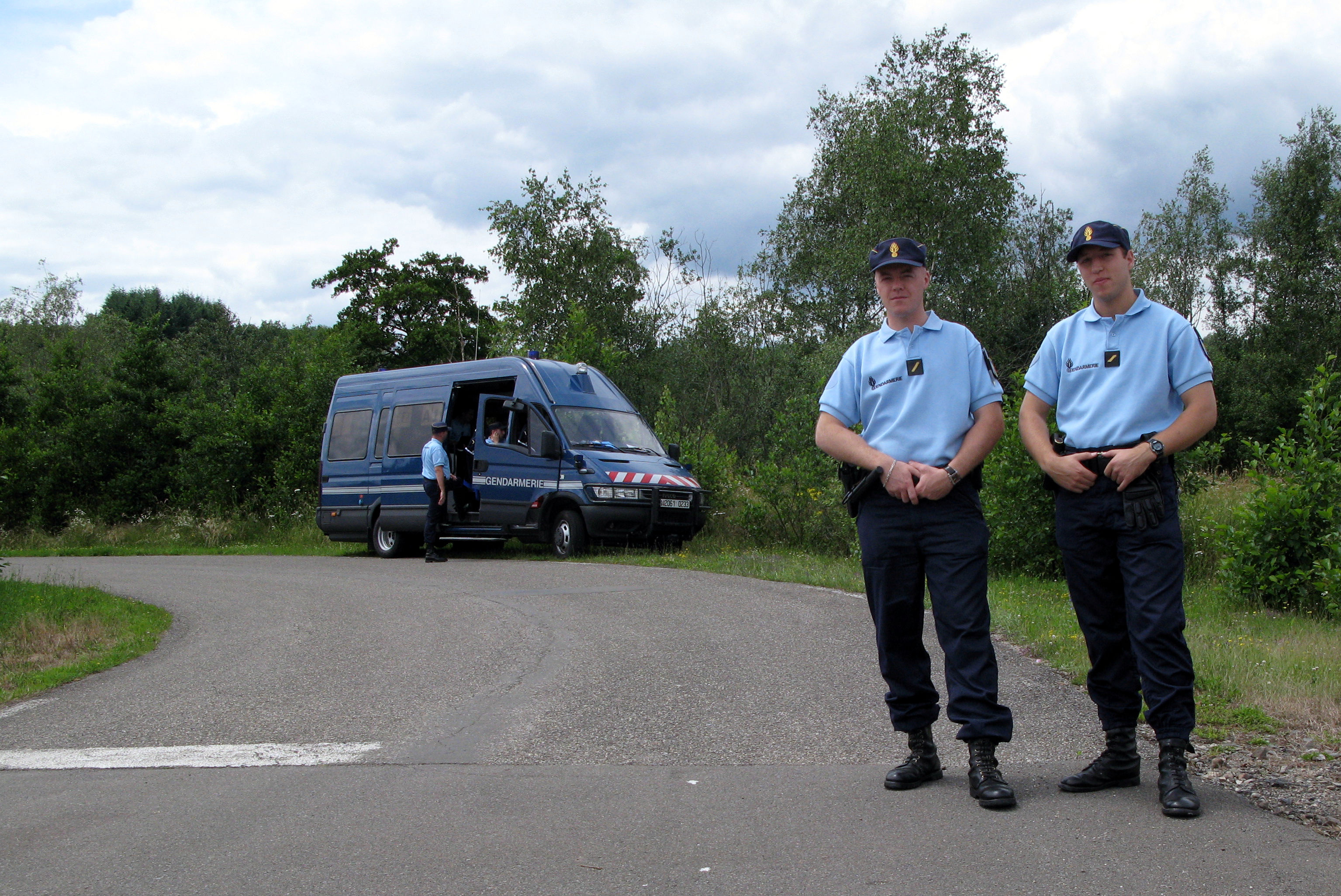
Gendarmes with a van in 2007. French police reservists closely resemble regular police officers.

France has a reserve of the National Police (active in the cities) and the National Gendarmerie (mainly rural police member of the army). Its members are paid per day of service based on their availability. The Ministry of the Interior and the Ministry of Defense can also mobilize them in case of a serious threat to national security. Access to the reserve is obtained after less than one month of training in a police academy (police) or military barracks (gendarmerie). There is also continuing education. Ranks are obtained with seniority of service and a competitive examination for officers. There are 1,500 police reservists as of 2022 and 29,000 gendarmerie reservists as of 2018. They are composed of men and women with age limits for registration as well as medical aptitude. Reservists are required to have French nationality. Reservists have the same uniforms and skills as professional police officers or gendarmes and almost the same equipment, except for certain specific prerogatives (maintenance of order, judicial protection agent, judicial police officer), they are officially assistant judicial police officers. They cannot record all offences.

== Germany ==
In Germany, auxiliary police forces (Freiwilliger Polizeidienst or Sicherheitswacht) exist in the states of Baden-Württemberg, Bavaria, Hesse, and Saxony. The auxiliary police (Freiwillige Polizei-Reserve) of Berlin was dissolved in 2002. Their jurisdiction varies between states.

=== Baden-Württemberg ===
Founded in May 1963, the Baden-Württemberg auxiliary police (Freiwilliger Polizeidienst Baden-Württemberg) consists of 1,201 members.

The officers are required to complete two weeks of training after which they are usually deployed on service with a regular police officer. In the eyes of law, they are fully authorized police officers, wear normal police uniforms with a certain patch and complete police gear, including pepper spray, handcuffs and Walther P5 pistol.

Though, the coalition contract of 2011-2016 between the governing political parties Bündnis 90/Die Grünen and the SPD seeks the abolishment of the auxiliary police and the financial supply as well as the recruitment of new auxiliary officers was suspended.

=== Bavaria ===
The Bavarian auxiliary police (Bayerische Sicherheitswacht) was officially founded on 31 December 1996.

Officers have limited legal powers: apart from a citizen's arrest, briefly detain and question a person and check their identification and can ask a dangerous person to leave the area (Platzverweis under Article 16, PAG).

Equipped with a radio and pepper spray, they usually patrol on foot or by bicycle and do not wear a full uniform, but either plain clothes with a brassard or a marked shirt.

=== Hessen ===
The auxiliary police in Hessen (Freiwilliger Polizeidienst Hessen) was introduced in October 2000 and employs around 750 members of which approximately 30% are women.

The officers are given 50 hours. Their patrol is limited to beats on foot and serves traffic control, assistance to major events and prevention of crime through mere police presence.

Although they wear ordinary police uniform (except wearing baseball caps instead of peaked caps) with "freiwilliger Polizeidienst" patches, their equipment is generally limited to pepper spray and a mobile phone.

Apart from this, they have limited powers as they may only ask a person to wait with them, briefly interrogate them, ask them to reveal their identity or to leave the area if they appear to be dangerous (Platzverweis under §31 HSOG).

=== Saxony ===
The auxiliary police of Saxony (Sächsische Sicherheitswacht) was formed on 1 April 1998. A third of the 800 active members are women.

After being trained for 60 hours, they usually patrol on foot in blue or green jackets or shirts, showing presence on public transport, openly accessible buildings such as shopping malls and other public areas.

They are equipped with radio and pepper spray and are authorised to conduct a stop (§ 21, Abs. 1 Sächsisches Polizeigesetz) of a similar nature to officers in Bavaria or Hesse.

== Hungary ==
Matrix Police seal

In Hungary, the auxiliary police are the Polgárőrség (formally "Nationwide Civil Self-Defense Organization"; directly translated as "Civil Guard"; short name "OPSZ").

Established in 1989 and brought under the provisions of Act 52 of the Hungarian Parliament in 2006, the Polgárőrség consists of uniformed and unarmed volunteers who take part in police work in various fields such as neighbourhood watch, vehicle patrol, citizen's arrests (only in flagrante delicto), assisting the Rendőrség, and youth crime prevention. Since 2009, auxiliary duties were expanded to include traffic directing and crossing guard work. The Polgárőrség also operates an automatic number-plate recognition unit called the Matrix Police.

The presence of the Auxiliary Police, in uniform, on patrol in marked police units has been proven to reduce vandalism and other crimes in the community. The force is made up of 80,000 volunteers.

Hungarian Auxiliary Police members do not possess more authority or rights than any other citizen. Since 2009, auxiliaries can carry pepper spray, direct traffic at traffic collision sites and pedestrian crossings in front of kindergartens and primary schools.

== India ==
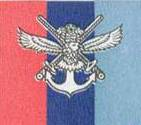
Indian Home Guard Triservices Crest

The Home Guard is an Indian auxiliary force that supports the State/UT police forces, as well as disaster and rescue services, in maintaining internal security, civil defense, and emergency response. Home Guards are responsible for internal security, traffic control, civil defense, border patrol, Coast Guard support, and firefighting and rescue assistance. They also maintain functional units dedicated to motor transport, engineering, first aid, water and power operations, communications, and other services.

Members of the Indian Home Guard are equipped with and trained to use older weapons such as the Lee–Enfield SMLE, Sten, and Bren.

The other auxiliary force comprises various state-level Civil Defence units, which assist the police, fire and rescue services, and disaster response agencies during times of calamity.

They operate under the respective State/UT Home Departments, following guidelines from the Ministry of Home Affairs, Government of India.

== Indonesia ==
The Indonesian Auxiliary Police, commonly known as POKDAR (PokdarKamtibmas), are the uniformed and non-uniformed auxiliary police of the Indonesian National Police. They were established in 1992.

Their duties are to assist police with neighborhood watch, intelligence gathering, and incident scene security. They are also permitted to assist in undercover operations, though their involvement is minimal. Auxiliaries are unarmed and equipped with radios and handcuffs.

The initial auxiliary uniform was similar to that of the Indonesian National Police, except with the police badge removed. The uniform was later changed to a simple black sleeveless jacket, with "POKDARKAMTIBMAS" written on the back in yellow.

== Ireland ==
The Garda Síochána are aided by an auxiliary force called the Garda Síochána Reserve, often simply called Garda Reserve. The position was created in 2006, with a planned 4,000 persons to join the Reserve according to An Garda Síochana Act 2005. The force are mainly involved in legislation relating to traffic, public order, theft and burglary.

They have limited powers, authorised by the Garda Commissioner. Garda Reserve members cannot drive a Garda patrol car, must be accompanied by a full member of the force while on patrol, and aren't allowed to carry firearms. Reserve members carry out duties such as event policing, attend court proceedings, assist at road check-points and road collisions. Reserves members are given training in relation to law, human rights, Garda communication, self-defence and Garda discipline and procedures.

== Israel ==
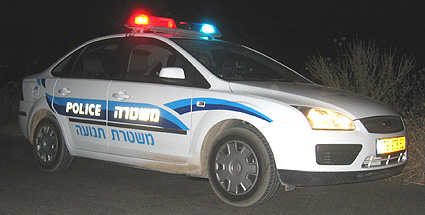
Mishmar Ezrachi police car

The Israeli term for auxiliary police is Mishmar Ezrachi, which can be translated as "Civil Guard". This organization includes uniformed and non-uniformed civilians who volunteer for police work in various fields such as neighbourhood watch, regular patrol, traffic enforcement, bomb squad assistants, youth crime prevention, coast guard, border patrol, and diving operations. The Civil Guard is a division of the Israel Police, and is tasked with first response before regular police units arrive; however, they are generally considered separate from them, with less powers in comparison.

Equipment of the Civil Guard generally consists of a fluorescent yellow police vest, flashlight, radio, firearms, handcuffs and whatever else may be required particular to the assignment. Some volunteers are armed with rifles and, if they have any, personally owned weapons. Issued equipment is returned at the end of each shift. Most volunteers manage about one shift a week (2 to 4+ hours), while the minimum requirement is 12 hours a month.

The Civil Guard is composed mainly of "classic" volunteers who patrol in a car or on foot. They go through basic training and have limited police powers while on duty. They may apprehend a suspect or make an arrest if necessary. There are also Matmid (מתמיד) volunteers which operate far more intensively than classics in regular police work. Yatam (ית"מ) volunteers mainly operate in traffic control. Both Matmid and Yatam are more like volunteer police officers, with almost all the authorities of a regular police officer, advanced training, and regular police uniforms. The Civil Guard also has special units such as bicycle-riders, search-and-rescue teams, divers, translators, and drivers, but their members have to go through additional training and have a higher level of commitment.

== Malaysia ==
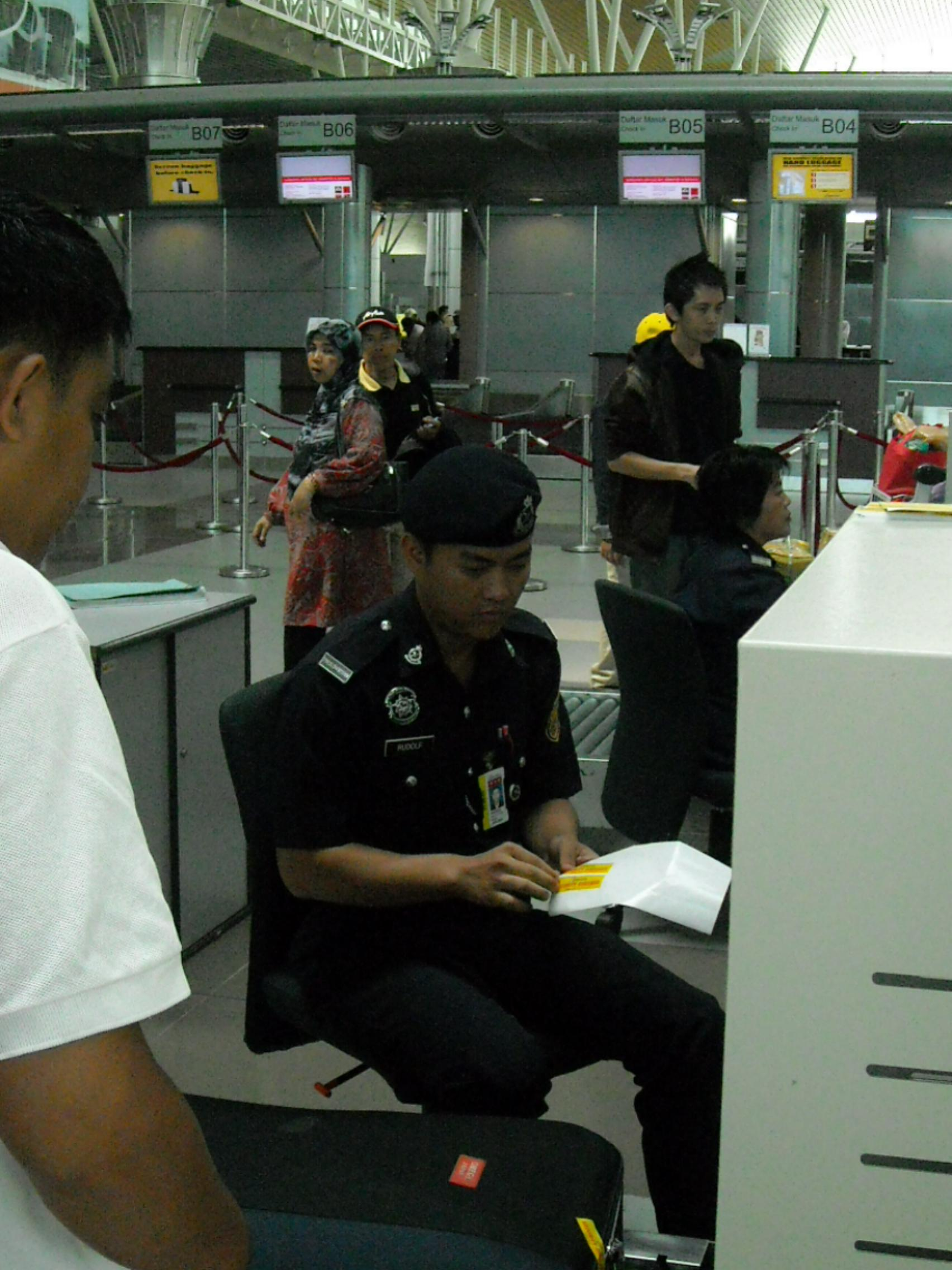
A Malaysia Airports auxiliary police officer examining a list of luggage being scanned at Kota Kinabalu International Airport

In Malaysia, auxiliary police (Malay: Polis Bantuan, ڤوليس بنتوان) refers to sworn private security police officers serving in autonomous government agencies and key government-linked companies or entities such as Northport (Malaysia) Bhd, Petronas, Central Bank of Malaysia, National Anti-Drugs Agency, the Federal Land Development Authority (FELDA) and the Inland Revenue Board; and other institutions with semi-governmental interests. Such institutions include Bank Simpanan Nasional, Malayan Railways Limited, Pos Malaysia Holdings Berhad (the national postal service), Malaysia Airports Holdings Berhad (the largest Malaysian airport operator), the North-South Expressway Project (PLUS), Tenaga Nasional Berhad (the national power service), Sarawak Energy Berhad and other similar strategic organizations.

Most of these organizations have already been privatized, but are allowed to maintain an auxiliary police unit. Under special circumstances, auxiliary police units have also been established by private companies with no government interests at all such as the force maintained by Resorts World Berhad, the company that operates the popular resort and casino at Genting Highlands. At present, there are 153 government agencies, statutory bodies and private companies authorized to operate their own auxiliary police units, with a total strength of 40,610 personnel.

Malaysian Auxiliary police are not attached per se to the Royal Malaysian Police, but are granted some police powers such as the power to carry out minor investigations or to make arrests within their area of jurisdiction. However, they are totally autonomous in matters related to the security at their company's premises and facilities. Some forces are also conferred the authority to issue traffic summonses (that are paid to the Federal Government, not the issuing organization) for offences committed within their area of jurisdiction. While Malaysian auxiliary police officers are empowered to carry firearms which is registered and own by the company, for this purpose they are subject to the same application and approval procedures as any other private company, instead of being treated as part of the Royal Malaysian Police.

Malaysian Auxiliary police units are not allowed to enforce federal laws outside of their designated company or agency premises or areas, as stated in IGSO H602 Section 3.16, which translate Auxiliary police possess some police powers in their designated company or agency premises or areas only when performing their duty.

Malaysian auxiliary police uniforms have been traditionally different from those of the regular police force, but a consolidation exercise by the Management Department of the Royal Malaysian Police Headquarters at Bukit Aman in 2004 has since authorised the use of regular police dress, insignia and other paraphernalia for sworn auxiliary police officers. The only differences are:

- the unit patches with company logo, e.g. Polis Bantuan Petronas (worn by auxiliary police officers only, sewn on the left sleeve);
- the shoulder title (which says "Polis Bantuan" or Auxiliary Police, instead of "Polis Diraja" or Royal Police), and;
- the service number (worn by junior police officers of Honorary Sergeant Major rank and below, just above the right breast pocket; auxiliary police numbers begin with the letters 'PB12345' whereas regular police officers numbers do not contain any letters).

Under Malaysian law, auxiliary police officers are obliged to serve voluntarily and are therefore not paid by the Government. As such, they are designated as full-time employees of the departments or corporations to which they serve and are remunerated on a different scale than regular police officers.

Under the Police Act 1967, the Inspector-General of Police, with the consent of the Minister in charge of police affairs and the King, may appoint any person to hold honorary auxiliary police ranks to the level of Honorary Superintendent of Police and below, and to establish their areas of jurisdiction.

== Mexico ==
The Mexico City Auxiliary Police are security police who work for the Ministry of Public Security and provide protection to government buildings, airports, and infrastructure in Mexico City. They do not protect banks or other financial institutions, as these are protected by the Banking Police (Bancarios).

== Netherlands ==
Since 1948, the Dutch police have had different forms of voluntary police officers. In 1948, shortly after World War II, the Reserve Police was established as a spare police force that would be pressed into service in the event of an emergency. The Reserve Police, as it was called from 1948 until 1994, consisted of men (and later women) who worked as fully armed and equipped police officers. Similar to their full-time colleagues, they were equipped with a pistol, short baton, and handcuffs.

After police reforms in 1994, volunteer police were fully integrated into the 25 regional police forces. Between 1994 and 2010, volunteers were no longer permitted to carry firearms, though older volunteers had their firearm grandfathered in, provided they continued to train with it and prove competent. Eventually, firearms were returned to volunteer police inventories, but volunteers require a full police diploma, several years of field experience as an unarmed officer, and additional police safety training. In 2012 the initial training program for new voluntary police officers was changed, reducing the training from three years down to one year. Dutch voluntary police officers hold the same police powers and wear the same uniform as their professional counterparts.

Since around the year 2000, police forces in the Netherlands started experimenting with police volunteers who performed administrative, house keeping, and other tasks. Labour unions have always criticized this. As of today, no definitive form for this type of volunteerism has been found and it still is subject of negotiations.

== Norway ==
In Norway, conscripts who have completed their initial period of military training can be transferred to the auxiliary police Politireserven (PR) rather than joining the military reserves. The PR is managed by the Mobile Police, and is intended to reinforce the regular police in case of national emergencies or disasters. The PR only exists in the central eastern part of the country. After a ten-day introduction course, and with refresher courses every few years, the PR troops can be used for armed or unarmed guard duties, border and traffic checkpoints, and for public order duties.

== Russia ==
The Voluntary People's Druzhina was the auxiliary law enforcement agency of the Soviet Union. It continues to be the auxiliary police in modern Russia.

== Singapore ==
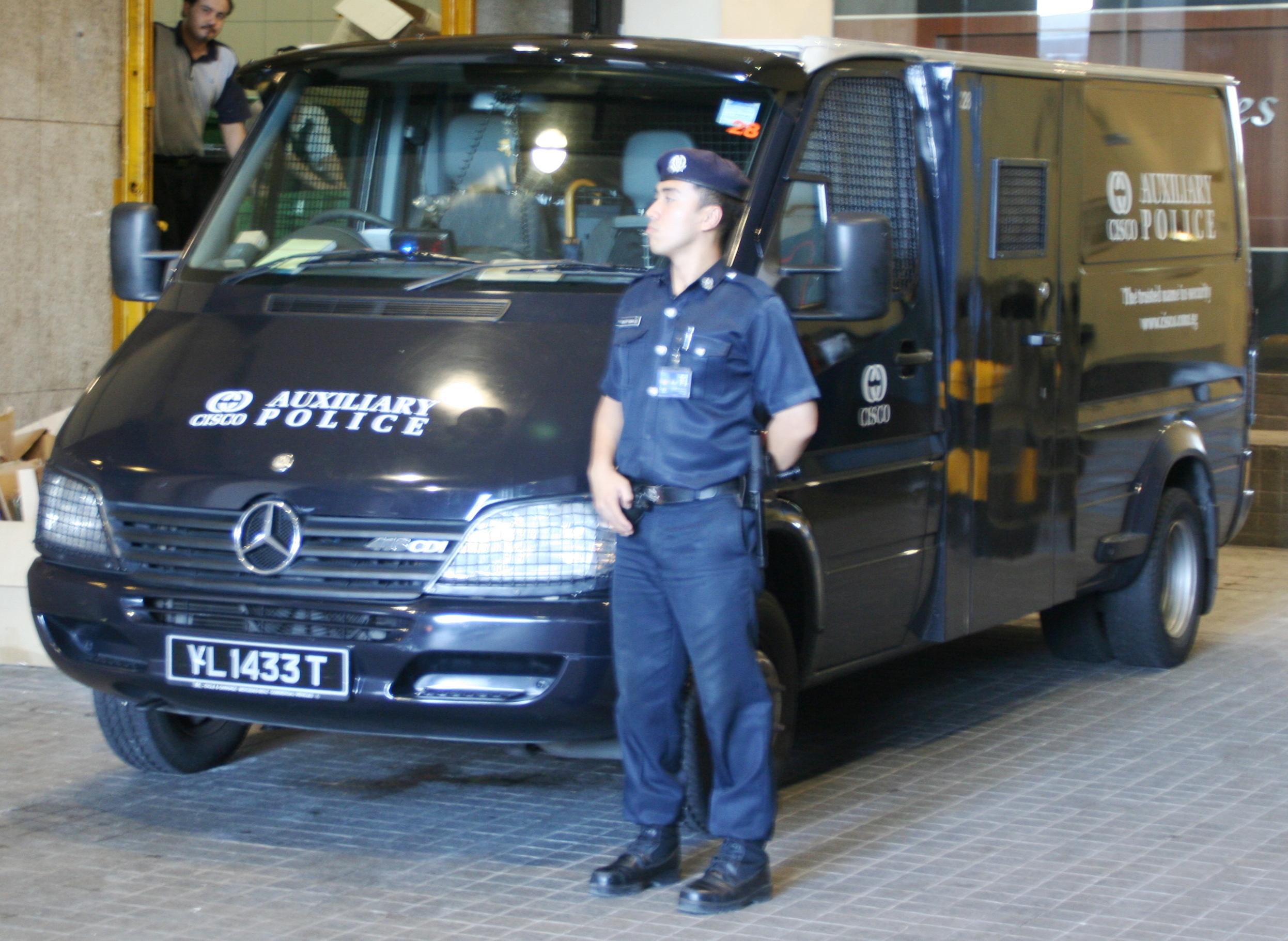
A Certis CISCO auxiliary police officer beside an armoured truck at Change Alley

In Singapore, auxiliary police are security police appointed under Section 92(1) or (2) of the Police Force Act 2004. They are vested with all the power, protection and immunity of a police officer of corresponding rank and are licensed to carry firearms when carrying out their duties. Auxiliary police officers are full-time employees of companies known as auxiliary police forces (APF), and are not directly affiliated to the Singapore Police Force (SPF). Auxiliary police officers are trained through attending a residential training course, the curriculum of which is set by the Security Industry Regulatory Department (now the Police Licensing and Regulatory Department), a department of the SPF established by in 2004 to regulate the security industry.

After passing the training course and being appointed as auxiliary police, each auxiliary police officer is issued with a warrant card signed by the Commissioner of Police of the SPF with a National Skills Recognition Scheme certificate.

The first APF originated from the Airport Security Force formed under the Department of Civil Aviation in 1956 to guard and patrol at the former Paya Lebar Airport. In July 1963, it was officially designated as an APF.

In 1965, Malayan Airways formed its own APF as well. In 1967, when Malayan Airways was renamed Malaysia Singapore Airlines (MSA), the Security Department was called MSA Police. When MSA was broken up into Singapore Airlines and Malaysian Airlines System in 1972, the Singapore component of the MSA Police became the SIA Auxiliary Police Force. In 1973, when Singapore Airport Terminal Services (SATS) was incorporated by SIA as a fully owned subsidiary, the SIA Auxiliary Police Force was renamed the SATS Auxiliary Police Force. In 1989, it was restructured as SATS Security Services, a wholly owned subsidiary of SATS.

In 1972, to meet the need of the commercial world in Singapore for armed guards, till then provided by the SPF's Guards and Escort Unit, the Parliament of Singapore passed an act to spin off the Guards and Escort Unit into a statutory board named the Commercial and Industrial Security Corporation (CISCO).

There were also other auxiliary police forces in Singapore such as the Pulau Bukom Auxiliary Police, CIAS Auxiliary Police (since renamed the Aetos Auxiliary Police Force), and the PSA Auxiliary Police (since merged with Aetos). These auxiliary police forces were granted licences and powers under the Police Force Act to operate only in restricted geographical areas, such as in the ports, airports, or Pulau Bukom Island.

In October 2004, following the enactment of the Police Force Act 2004, these auxiliary police forces were no longer restricted to operate in the airport or seaports and could offer their services throughout the whole island of Singapore.

There are currently five auxiliary police forces in Singapore:

- Aetos Auxiliary Police Force (part of Aetos Security Management)
- Certis CISCO Auxiliary Police Force (part of Certis Group)
- Installations Auxiliary Police Force
- Pulau Bukom Auxiliary Police Force
- SATS Auxiliary Police Force (part of SATS Security Services)

In 2017, some of the APFs are looking to recruit Taiwanese nationals due to problems in recruiting and retaining Singaporeans and Malaysians alike. Some were deployed to work at land checkpoints alongside Singaporeans in 2018.

According to reports from Radio Taiwan International, some Taiwanese nationals refuse to continue working due to the stress in their assigned job posts.

In January 2024, Home Affairs Minister K Shanmugam said that other countries are being considered for recruitment into APFs such as China, India, Myanmar and the Philippines due to concerns of not recruiting enough Singaporeans.

== South Korea ==
In South Korea, the Auxiliary Police have a military-like structure, in that it consists of volunteers selected among eligible males (aged 18–35) who have not yet fulfilled South Korea's obligatory military duty; service in the Auxiliary Police is accepted as equivalent to military duty. The length of service for Auxiliary Policemen is 21 months, which is identical to that of ROK Army enlistments. Within the Auxiliary Police ranks exists four sub-ranks similar to the four enlisted ranks in the ROK Army: Private Constable (이경; Igyeong), Private Constable First Class (일경; Ilgyeong), Corporal Constable (상경; Sanggyeong), and Sergeant Constable (수경; Sugyeong).

When enlisted, volunteers first go through four-week basic military training at the Korea Army Training Center under administration of Ministry of National Defense. The recruits are then handed over to the Ministry of Public Administration and Security for later administration, and are given a three-week police training before being deployed to various police units (that are each no bigger than the size of a company) throughout the country. Depending on their assignment, the Auxiliary Policemen may assist the National Police Agency with a wide array of police works, such as riot policing, traffic control, crowd control, surveillance and patrol. Upon completion of their service, Auxiliary Policemen are discharged with a Sergeant rank in the ROK Army Reserve (except in cases of demotion). The unit is now currently disbanded and appears to be completely deactivated.

== Sri Lanka ==
The Sri Lanka Reserve Police was the part-time volunteer section of the Sri Lanka Police, the statutory police force in the island until it was disbanded in 2006 with its personal transferred to the Sri Lanka Police. Since 2008, Community Police, also known as Civil Committees, have been established across the country (mostly in urban areas) to increase public safety following attacks orchestrated by the Tamil Tigers.

== Sweden ==
The Swedish Auxiliary Police (Beredskapspolisen) was created in 1986 with the purpose to aid the Swedish Police Authority, primarily as a pool of trained manpower in special situations such as larger disturbances of the peace, major black-outs and power failures, and natural disasters. The Auxiliary Police were disbanded on 1 October 2012 after staffing increases in the Police Authority rendered it unnecessary. At the time of its disbandment it had 1,500 officers.

The Auxiliary Police were organised with at least one section per län. Each section consisted of two or more troops and each troop consisted of three eight-man squads. All leadership positions were filled by experienced police officers from the regular police force who had undergone leadership training. The auxiliary police officers were recruited exclusively among people who had completed their military service but since 1 January 2008 military service was no longer a requirement.

The uniforms were similar to the regular police with the exception of the name Beredskapspolis instead of Polis. The Auxiliary Police were initially armed with the Carl Gustaf m/45, before being superseded by the CGA5P. Eventually, the Auxiliary Police was disarmed entirely, with the Police Authority's SIG Sauer 9×19mm Parabellum pistols available only when necessary.

The Swedish Government announced in 2023 that they plan to reintroduce the Beredskapspolis. It would be used in the event of serious emergencies caused by gang crime and terrorism.

== United Kingdom ==
The Special Constabulary is the part-time volunteer section of a statutory police force in the United Kingdom or some Crown dependencies. Its officers are known as special constables or informally as specials. Specials hold exactly the same powers as their "regular" (full time Police Constable) counterparts, they have opportunities to be promoted to supervisory ranks (such as sergeant and inspector), however they are limited to the office of constable and as such do not receive additional police powers if promoted to the rank of inspector. Special promotions are merely administrative and do not reflect the equivalent regular rank.

Special Constables are permitted to carry all equipment utilised by their full-time counterparts – including a baton, PAVA or CS spray and handcuffs. Although Special Constables aren't permitted to train in the use of firearms roles, they have recently been allowed to undertake Taser training and carry Taser operationally. They are, sometimes, allowed to join other specialist units such as Roads Policing Units.

The Police Service of Northern Ireland, the only routinely armed force in the UK, does not have a Special Constabulary. It does, however, have a Reserve programme. Reserve Constables are paid for their part-time work and are permitted to carry their personal protection weapon (PPW) on and off-duty, like their regular counterparts.

== United States ==
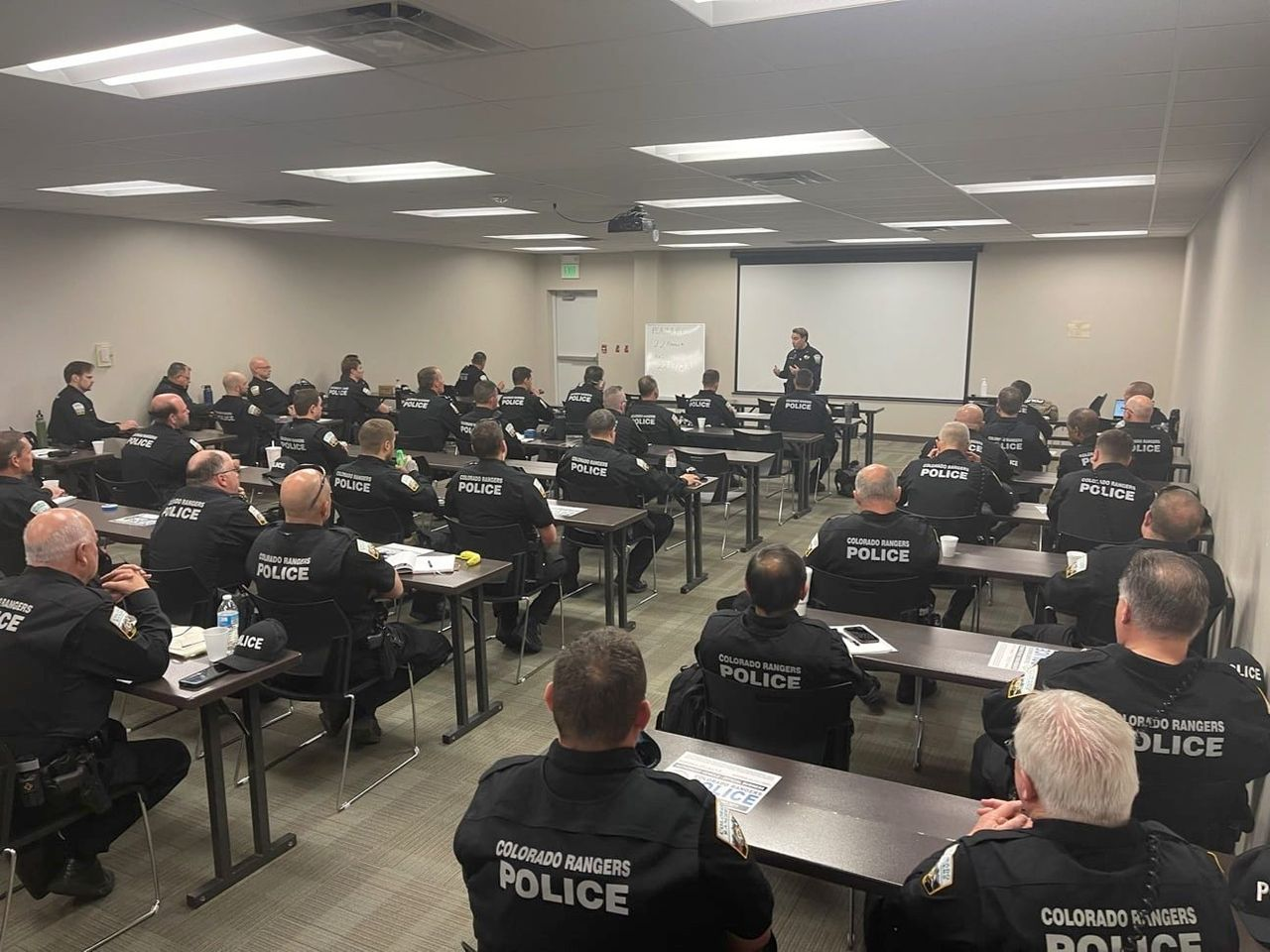
Colorado Rangers at a meeting in 2021

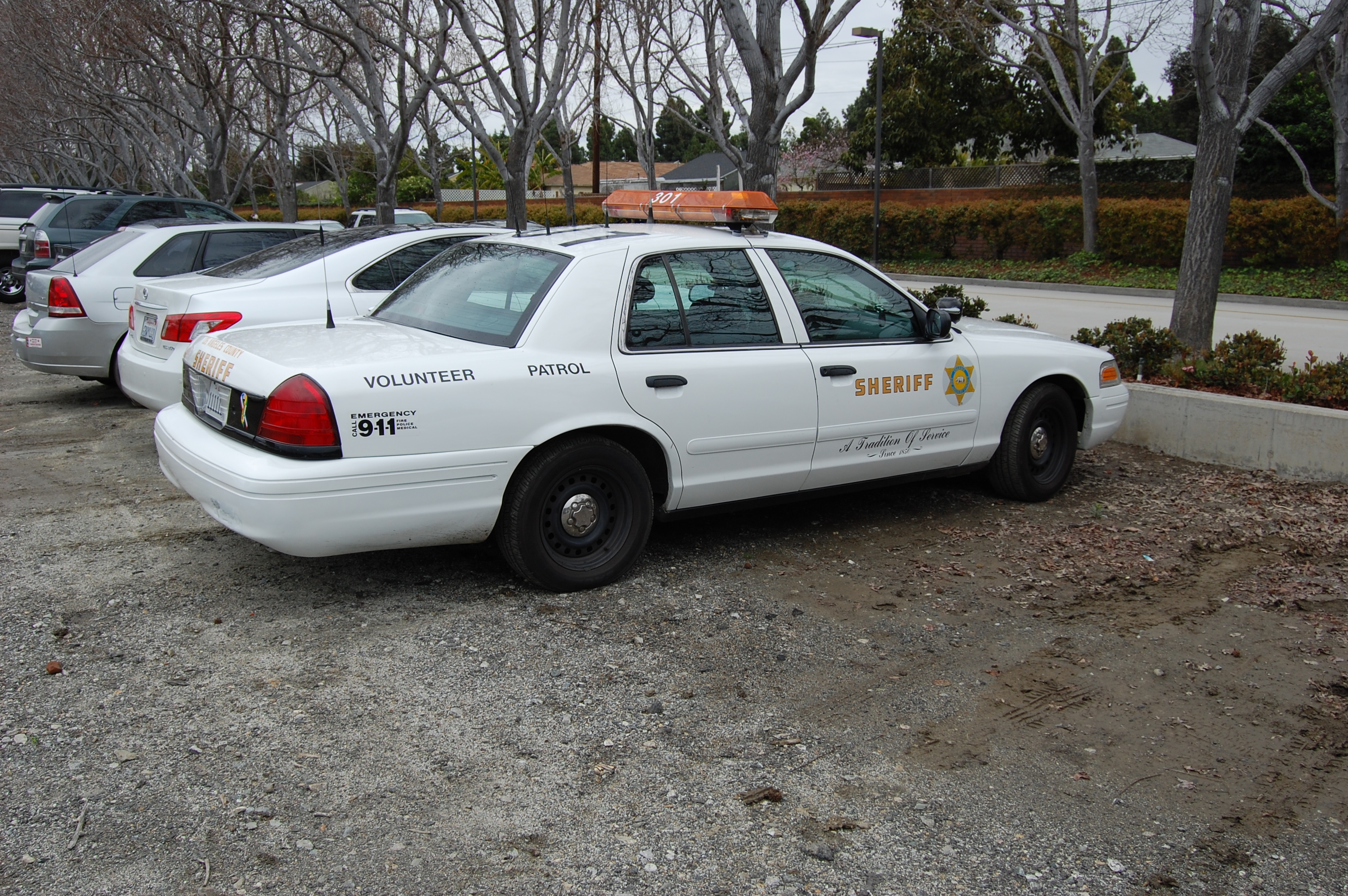
A Los Angeles County Sheriff's Department Volunteer Patrol car

In the United States, many police departments and sheriff's departments operate their own auxiliary police. Their powers, scope, armament, and transportation vary between each agency.

The Department of Justice Bureau of Justice Statistics reports that, as of 2013, there were more than 29,000 unpaid reserve (auxiliary) officers in the United States, and about 32% of local police departments had a reserve officer program. Larger cities are generally more likely to have a reserve program than smaller cities; 62% of police departments that patrol areas with a population of over 1 million have a police reserve program, while only 26% of the smallest departments (serving areas with a population lower than 2,500) do.

Colorado is the only U.S. state that uses a governmental statewide shared reserve composed of fully authorized peace officers, the Colorado Rangers. New Mexico operates the New Mexico Mounted Patrol, an all-volunteer state police agency which can be called upon to assist law enforcement anywhere in the state. Arizona operates the Arizona Rangers which will, on request, provide law enforcement support and assistance to any federal, state, or local law enforcement agency within the State of Arizona.

The New York City Police Department Auxiliary Police consists of about 4,500 unarmed volunteer auxiliary officers who conduct foot patrols, traffic control duty, and other activities. In a 1991 decision, the New York Court of Appeals held that the "fellow-officer rule" (a rule allowing a police officer "to rely on a communication from another police officer and to act upon it in making an arrest") applied to auxiliary officers.

In 2015, a volunteer reserve deputy in Oklahoma fatally shot Eric Harris, an unarmed black man; the reserve deputy was convicted of manslaughter.

== Historical auxiliary police units ==
=== Denmark ===
- HIPO Corps (1944–1945)

=== Czech Republic ===
==== Czechoslovak Republic ====
- Pomocná stráž Veřejné bezpečnosti (1952–1990)

=== Germany ===
==== East Germany ====
- Freiwilliger Helfer der Grenztruppen (1958–1990)
- Freiwilliger Helfer der Volkspolizei (1952–1990)

==== Federal Republic of Germany ====
- Freiwillige Polizei-Reserve (1963–2002)

==== Nazi Germany ====
- Hilfspolizei (February–August 1933)
- Schutzmannschaft
- Jewish Ghetto Police (1941(?)–1943)

=== Poland ===
- Ochotnicza Rezerwa Milicji Obywatelskiej (1946–1989)

=== Spain ===
- Guardia Civil Auxiliar (1982–1993)
- Somatén (1939–1976)

=== United Kingdom ===
- Auxiliary Division (1920–1922)
- Black and Tans (1920–1922)
- Royal Ulster Constabulary Reserve (1922(?)–2001)
- Ulster Special Constabulary (1920–1970)
- War Reserve Police (1938–1948)

=== United States ===
- Illinois Police Reserves (1923–2018)
- State Police of Crawford and Erie Counties (1872–2005)

== See also ==
- Auxiliaries
