= Freiwillige Polizei-Reserve =

Auxiliary police service of Berlin, West Germany

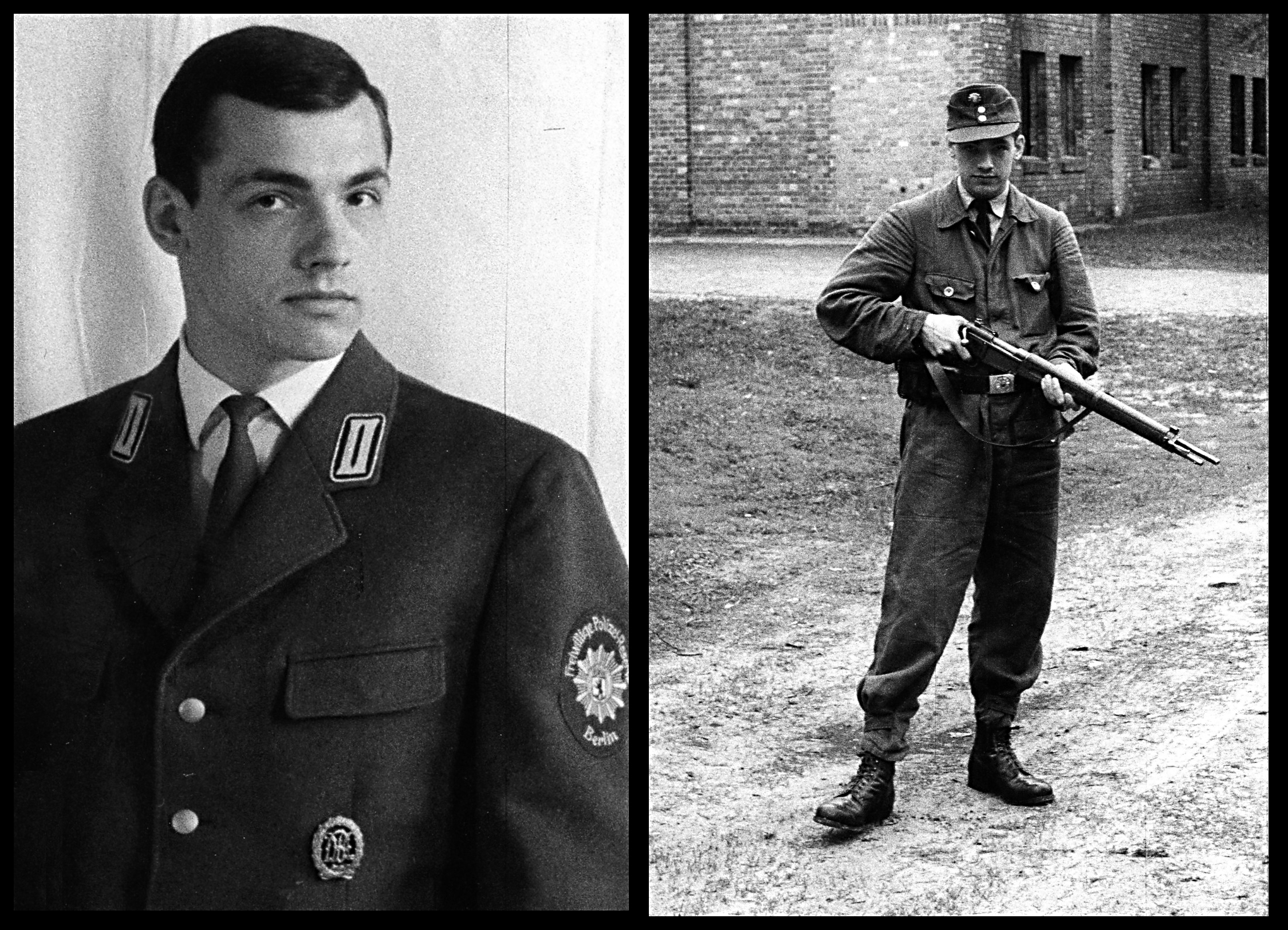
Member of the FPR in uniform in 1964 during basic training

The Freiwillige Polizei-Reserve (FPR; Voluntary Police Reserve) was an auxiliary police service of the German state of Berlin.

== History ==
It was founded on 25 May 1961 as reaction to the emerging Combat Groups of the Working Class and should originally help out the West Berlin Police in riots and to defend West Berlin in case of an attack (urban warfare and object protection). For this purpose, the police reservists were trained in the use of small arms.

In 1999, the auxiliary police force was renamed to Freiwilliger Polizeidienst (FPD) and shut down in 2002 for financial reasons.

== Controversy ==
In the last years of its existence, many neo-Nazis felt attracted due to the intensive firearm training and became members of the force, arousing criticism of the media: In 1993, an examination showed that around 500 of the 2500 members either had a criminal record or were affiliated with neo-Nazi groups.

== See also ==
- Auxiliary Police in Germany (Freiwilliger Polizeidienst)
