= Municipal police =

Law enforcement agencies that are under the control of local government

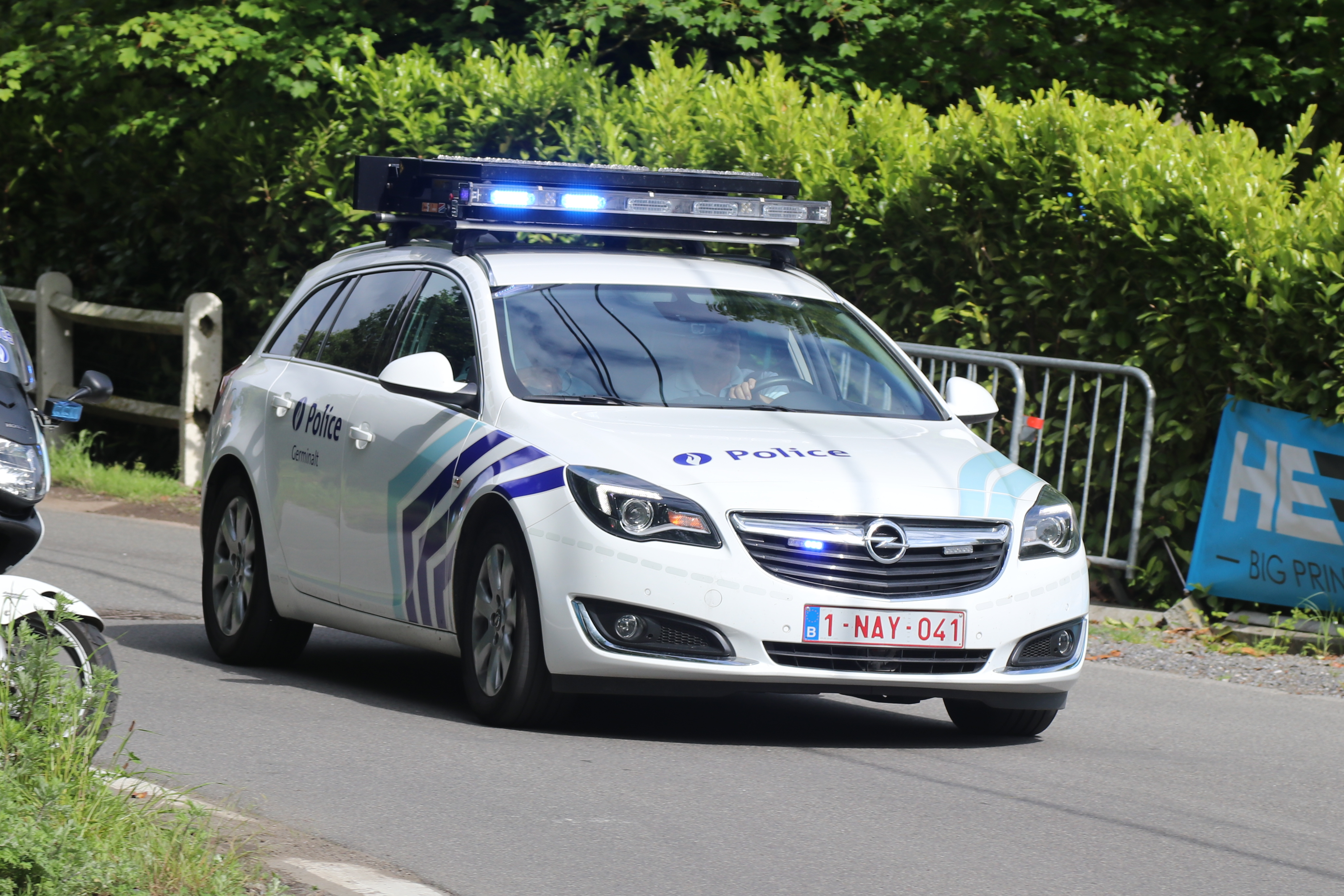
Patrol unit of the Local Police of the Germinalt zone in Wallonia (Belgium)

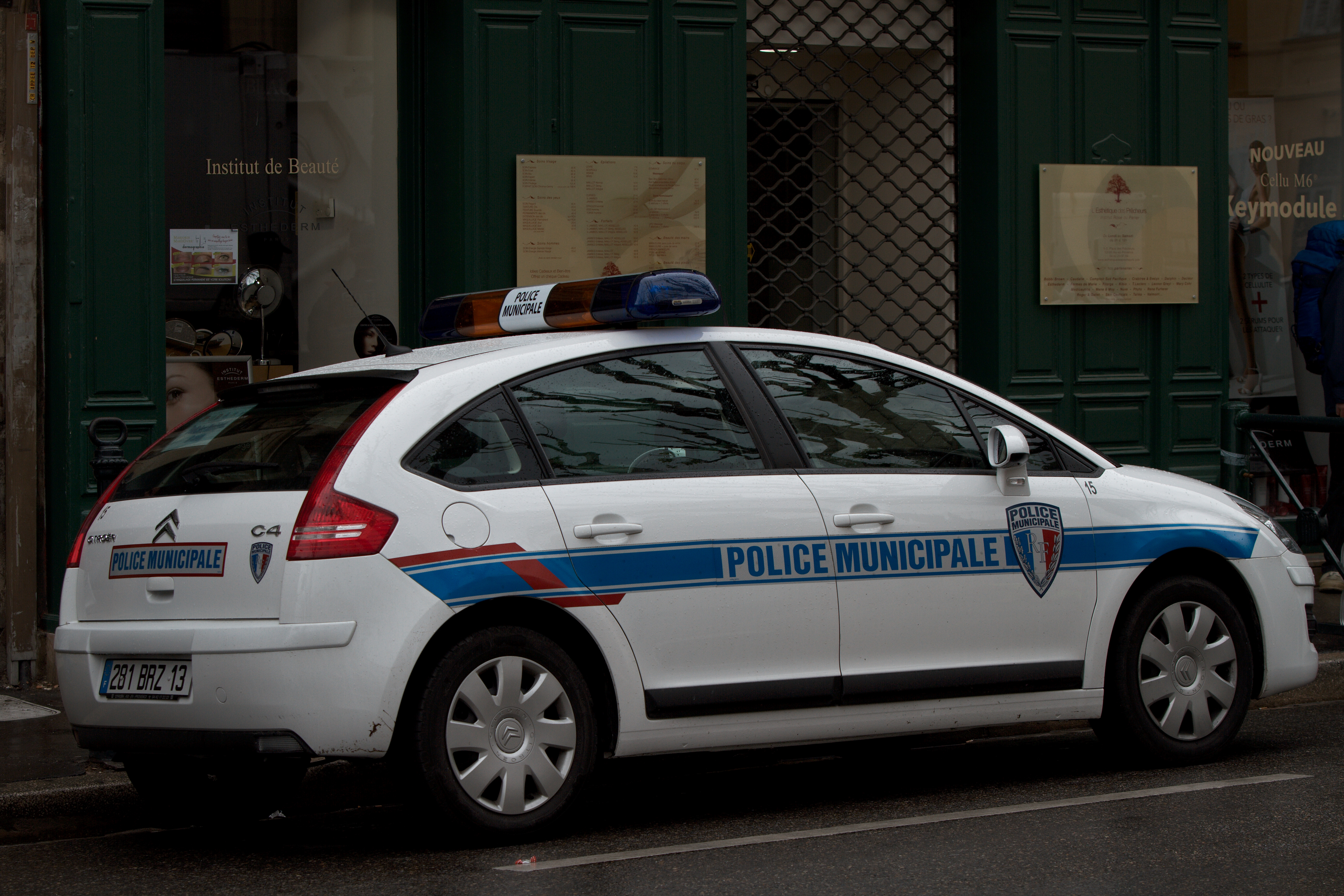
Police municipale Citroën C4 in Aix-en-Provence (France)

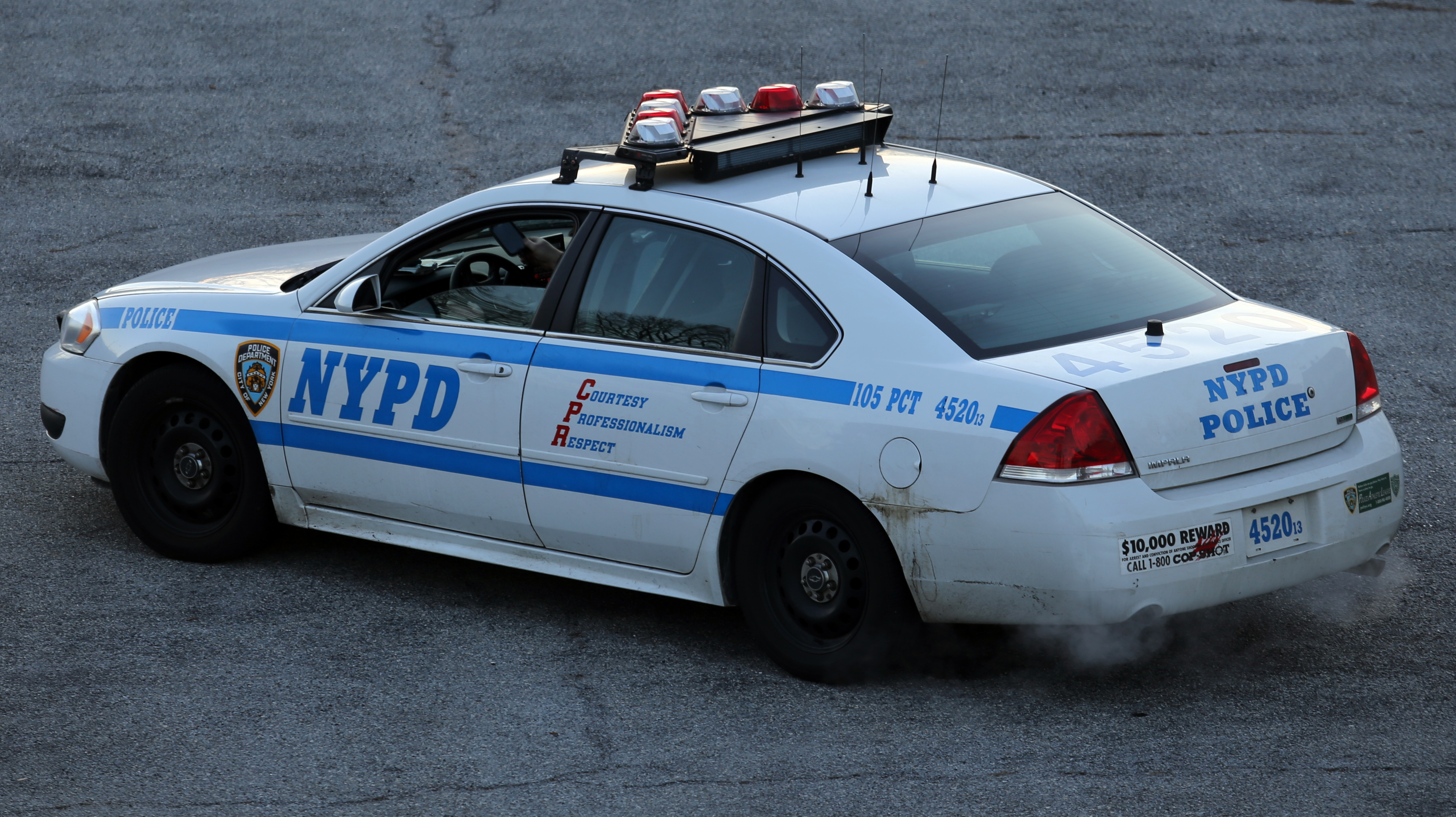
A New York Police Department (NYPD) cruiser. The NYPD is the biggest municipal police force in the world.

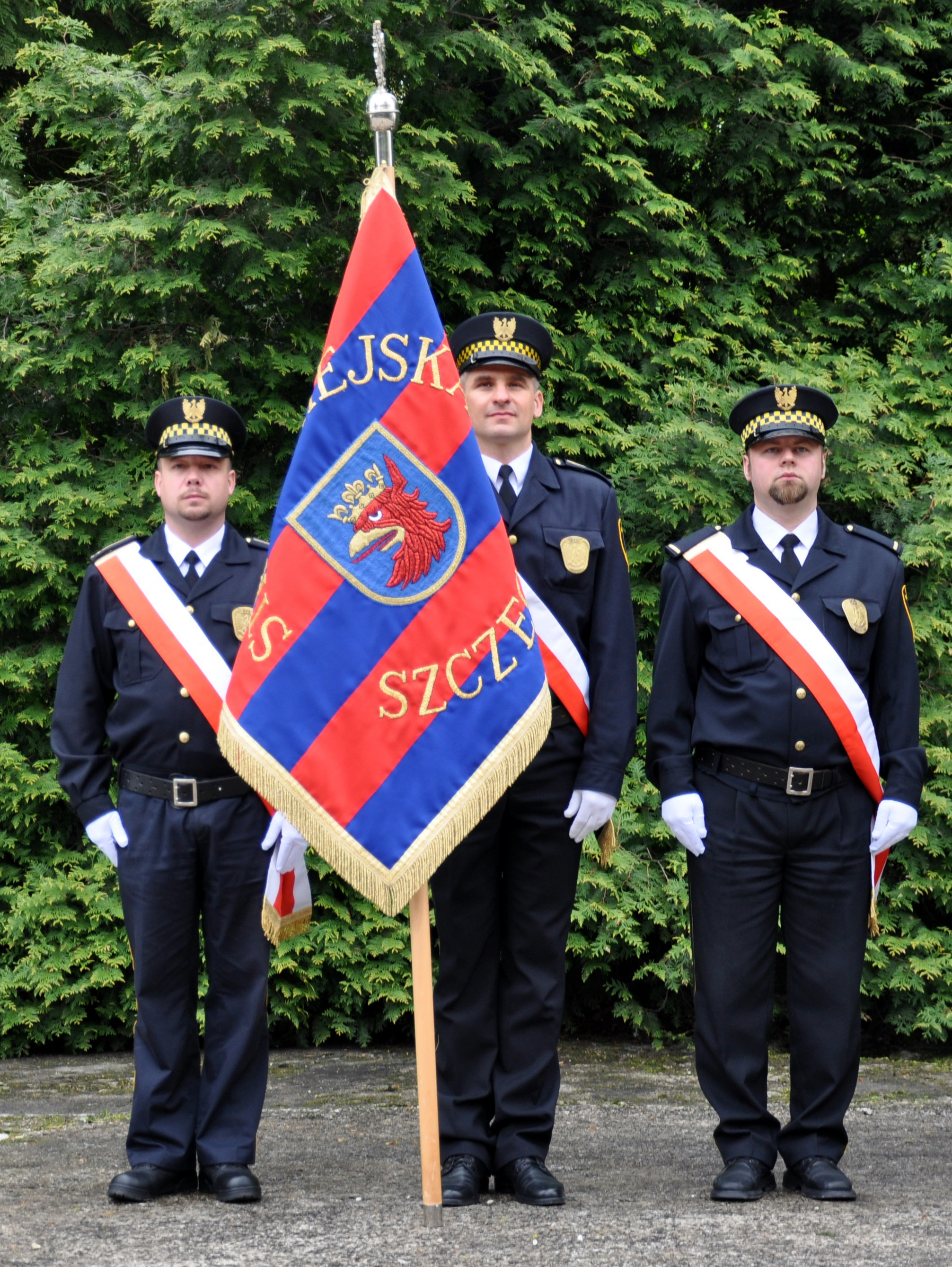
City Guard of Szczecin, Poland

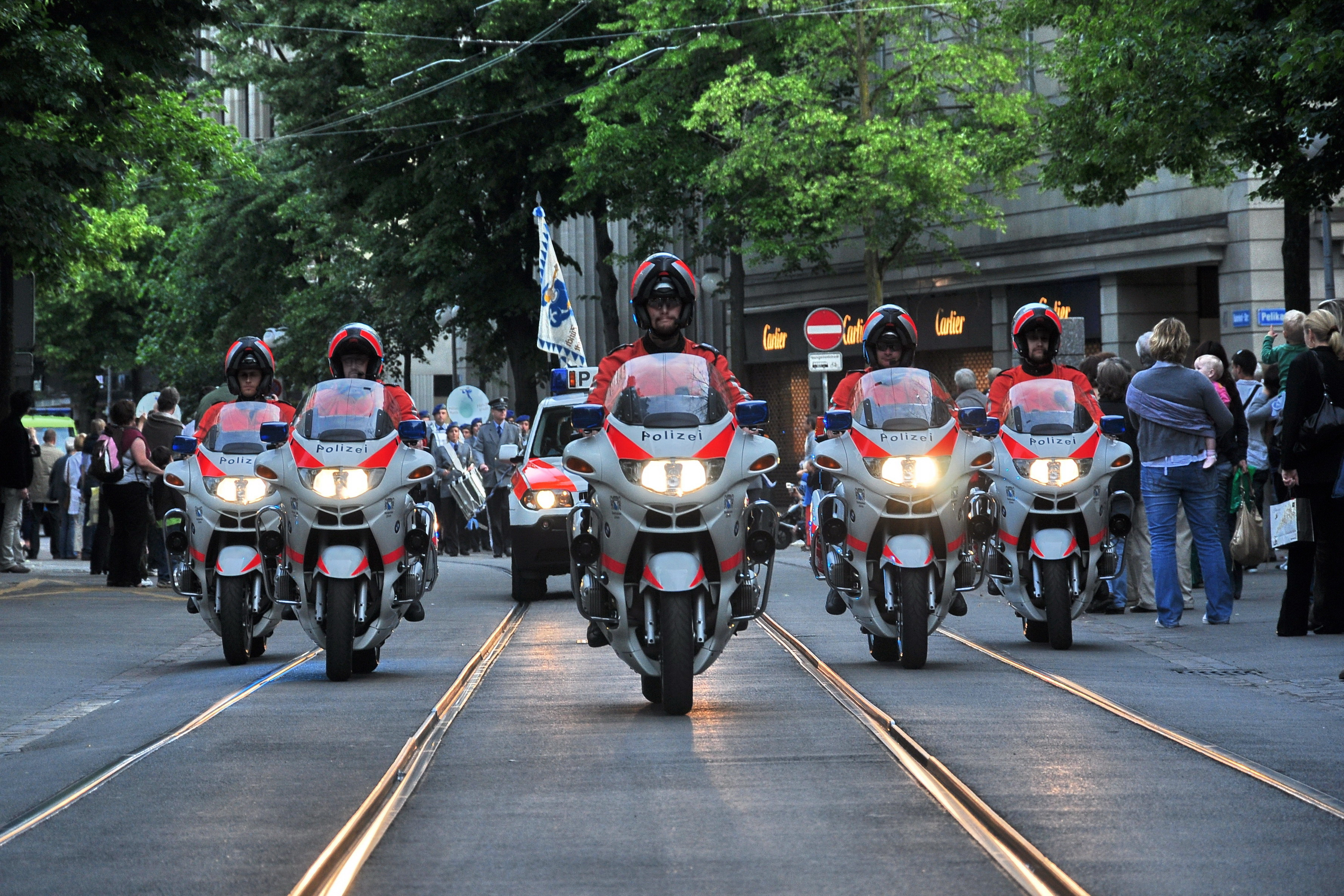
Parade of Stadtpolizei on occasion of centennial of Schutz und Rettung Zürich in 2011 in Zürich (Switzerland)

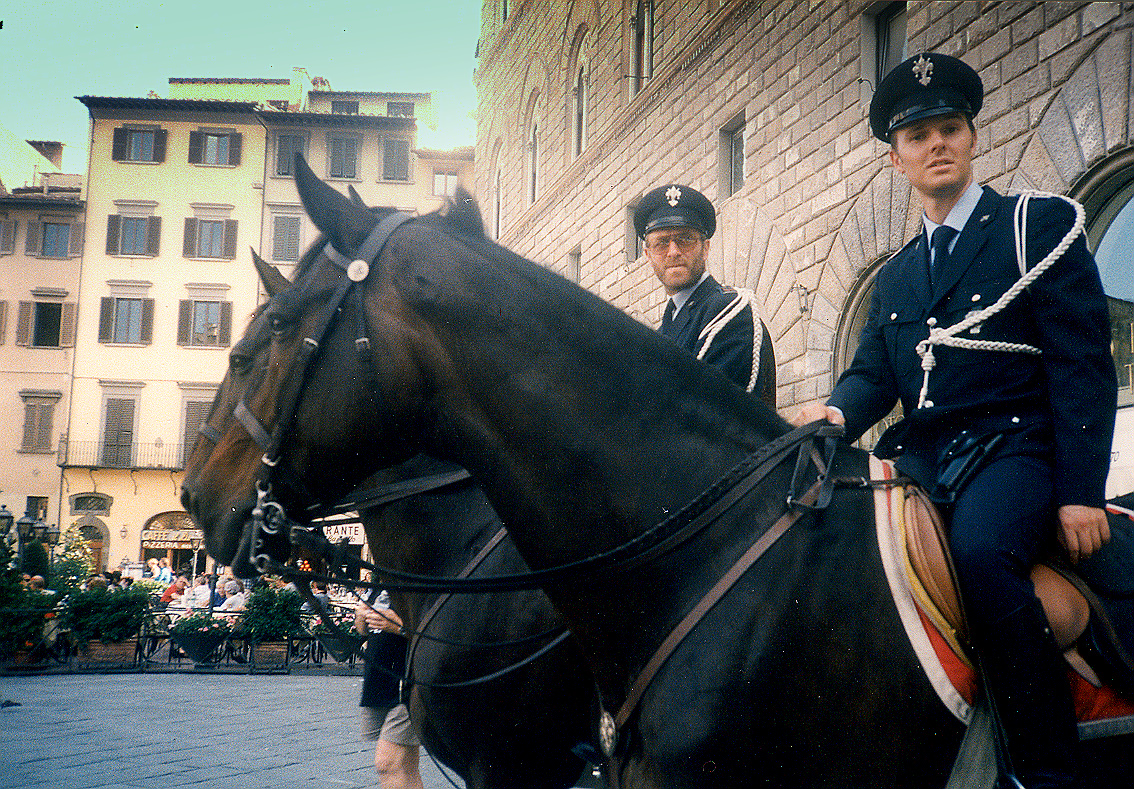
Mounted Polizia Locale in Piazza della Signoria in Florence (Italy)

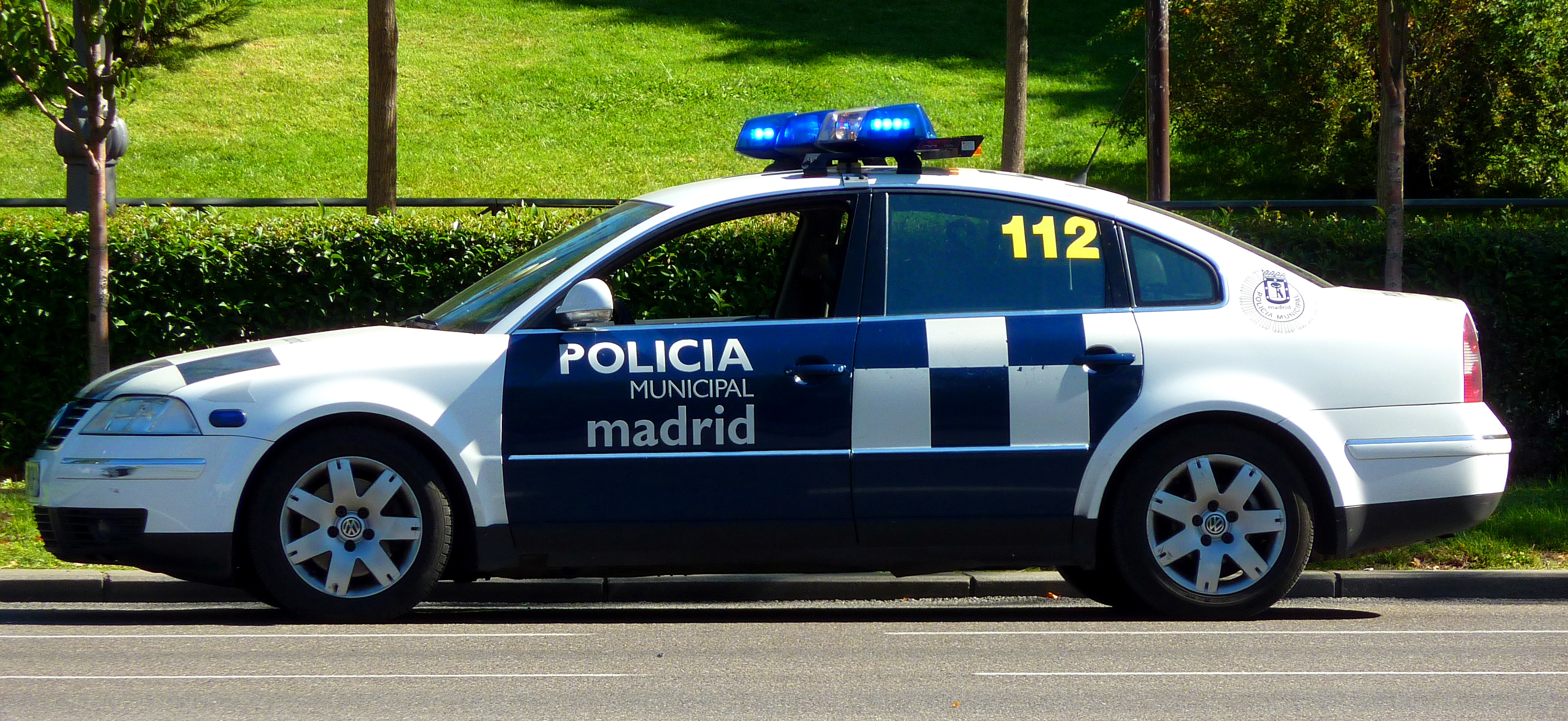
Policía Municipal of Madrid (Spain)

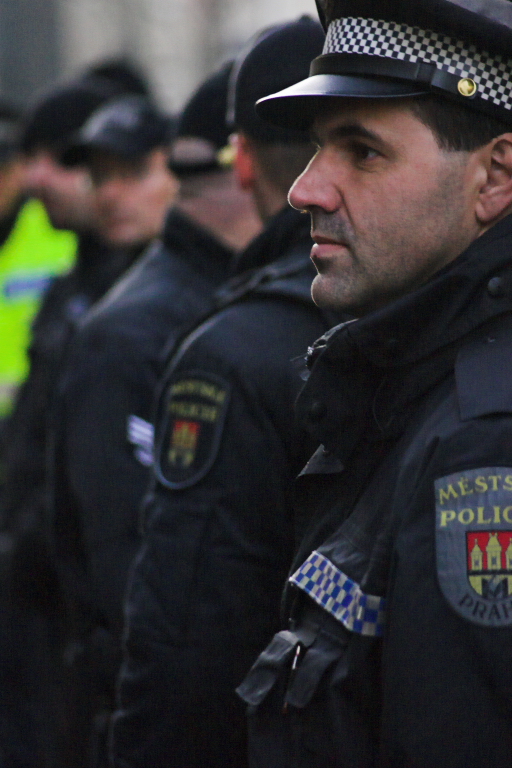
Municipal police officers (strážníci) in Prague (Czech Republic)

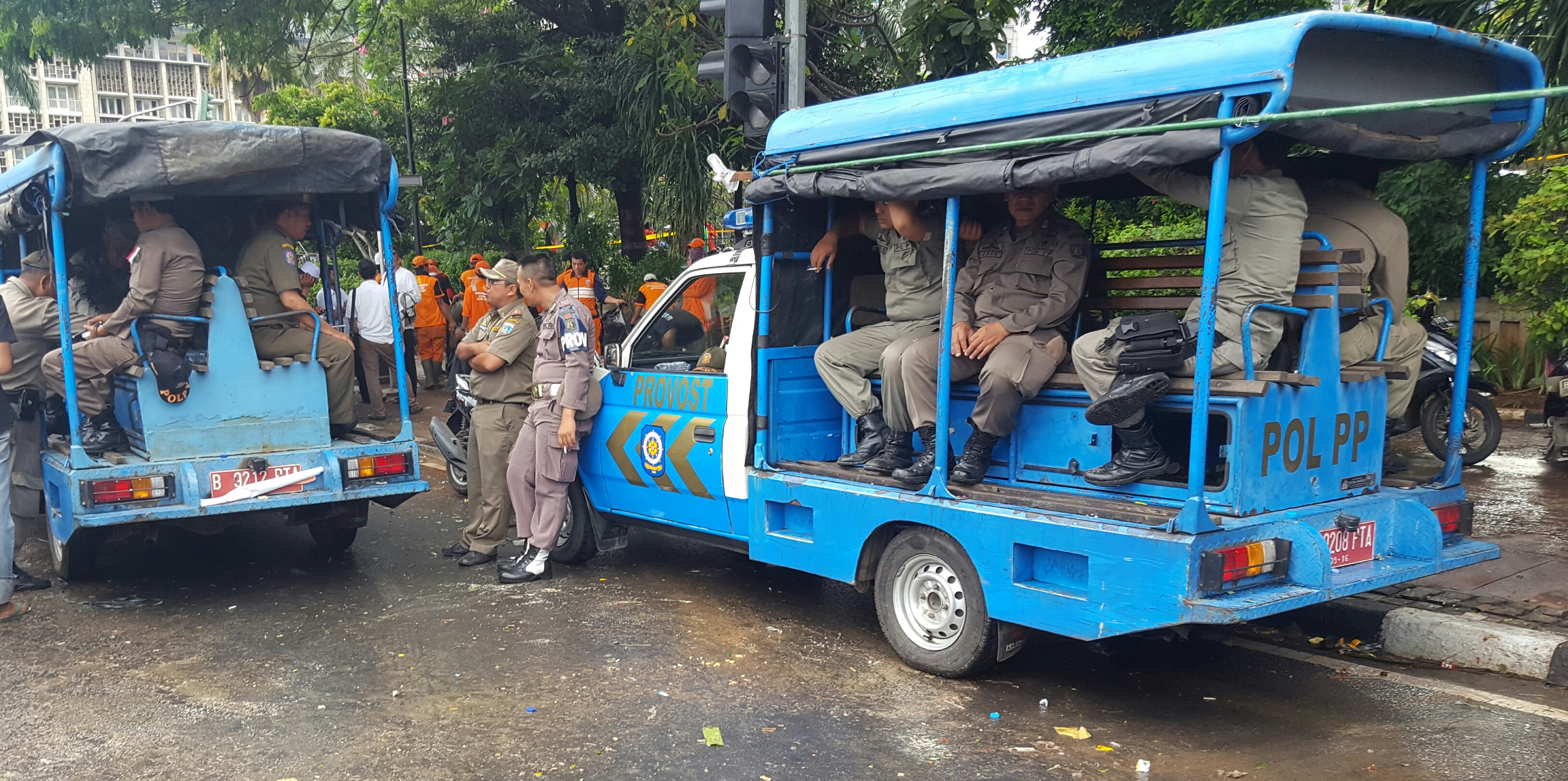
Indonesian Municipal Police personnel known as "Satpol PP"

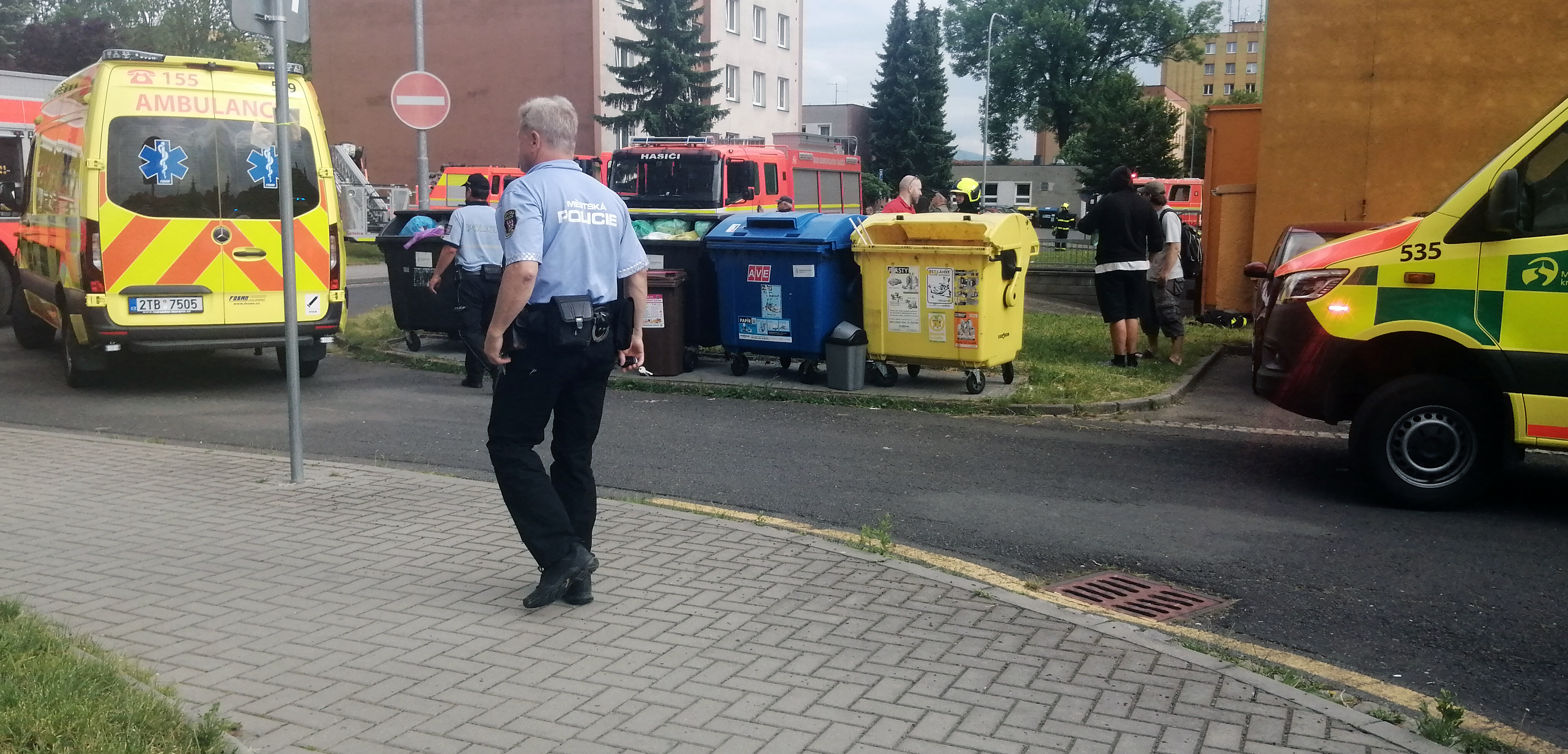
Příbor, Czech Republic Municipal Police Officer helping on the scene of a fire.

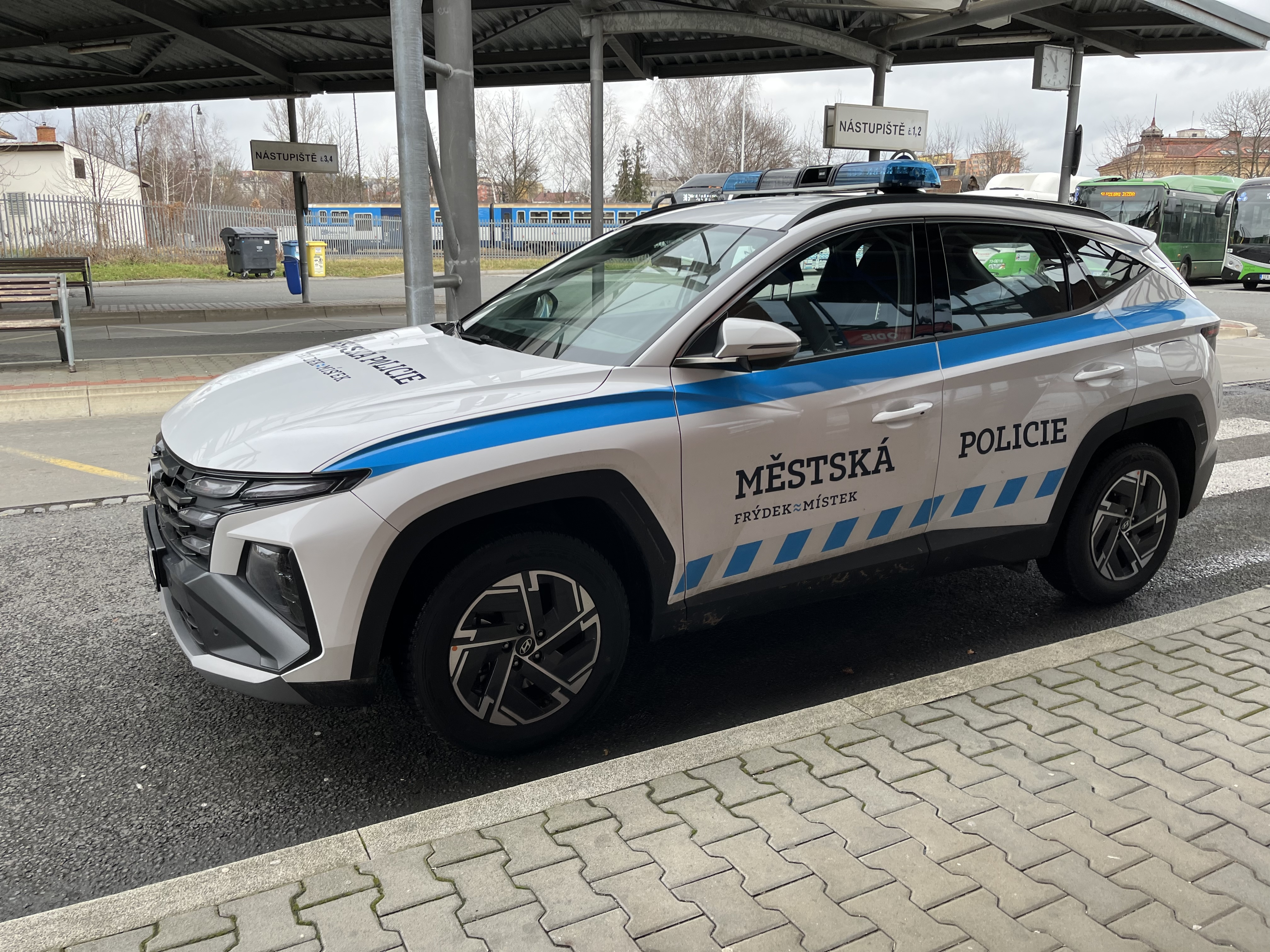
Frýdek Místek, Czech Republic Municipal Police Hyundai Tucson hybrid police car.

Municipal police, city police, or local police are law enforcement agencies that are under the control of local government. This includes the municipal government, where it is the smallest administrative subdivision. They receive funding from the city budget, and may have fewer legal powers than the "state paid" police. These police forces usually report to a mayor or a local police board.

== Historical development ==
Historically, the role of the municipal police of local civic protection was carried out by watchmen. Today, some formations of municipal police still carry the name of the city/communal/municipal guard.

== Municipal police by country ==
Country	English name	Native name(s)
Albania	Municipal Police	Albanian: Policia Bashkiake
Algeria	Municipal Guards	Arabic: حرس البلدي
Argentina	Buenos Aires City Police	Spanish: Policía de la Ciudad de Buenos Aires
Austria	Municipal police	German: Stadtpolizei (most common denomination), Gemeindepolizei, Gemeindesicherheitswache, Gemeindewachkörper
Australia	Council ranger	
Belgium	Local Police	French: Police Locale; Dutch: Lokale Politie; German: Lokale Polizei
Brazil	Municipal Guards	Portuguese: Guardas Municipais
Canada	Municipal and regional police services (criminal and administrative offences) and bylaw enforcement officers (administrative offences)	
Chile	Municipal Guards	Spanish: Guardias Municipales
China	Municipal Public Security Bureau	Chinese: 市公安局
Czech Republic	Municipal Police	Czech: městská policie, obecní policie
Estonia	Municipal Police	Estonian: Munitsipaalpolitsei, MuPo
France	Municipal Police	French: police municipale
Germany	City Police	German: Stadtpolizei, Kommunalpolizei, Polizeibehörde; Ortspolizeibehörde Bremerhaven: unique municipal police with detective branch
Greece	Municipal Police	Greek: Δημοτική Αστυνομία
Hungary	Local Governmental Law Enforcement	Hungarian: Önkormányzati Rendészet, Városőrség
India	City Police	
Indonesia	Municipal Police (Indonesia)	Indonesian: Satuan Polisi Pamong Praja ("SATPOL PP")
Italy	Municipal Police	Italian: Polizia Municipale, Polizia Comunale, Polizia Urbana, Polizia Locale or Vigili Urbani
Kazakhstan	Local Police	Kazakh: Жергілікті полиция Was created in 2015 with responsibilities for local beat policing, handling juvenile delinquency, preventing violence against women, road patrolling, environmental protection and non-pre-trial detention facilities. It was abolished in 2018 with these responsibilities returned to provincial police departments.
Latvia	Municipal Police	Latvian: Pašvaldības policija
Lithuania	Public Order Division	Lithuanian: Viešosios tvarkos skyrius
Malta	Local Enforcement Systems Agency (LESA)	Maltese: L-Aġenzija Sistemi ta’ Infurzar Lokali
Mexico	Municipal Police	Spanish: Policía Municipal
Namibia	Windhoek Police	
Netherlands	Municipal Enforcement	Dutch: Handhaving, Toezicht, Stadswacht, BOA (Bijzonder OpsporingsAmbtenaar. English: Special Enforcement Officer)Have some limited police powers like the use of (limited)force, handcuffs, detaining etc. (some have more powers than others)
Poland	City Guard	Polish: Straż miejska (in urban gminas, including cities with powiat rights, and urban-rural gminas), Straż gminna (in rural gminas)
Portugal	Municipal Police	Portuguese: Polícia Municipal
Romania	Local Police	Romanian: Poliția Locală
Serbia	Communal Militia	Serbian: Комунална милиција / Komunalna milicija
Slovakia	City/Municipal Police	Slovak: mestská polícia, obecná polícia
Slovenia	Communal Police	Slovene: Občinsko Redarstvo
South Korea	Municipal Police of Jeju Special Self-Governing Province	
Spain	Municipal Police	Spanish: Policía Municipal, Policía Local; Basque: Udaltzaingoa; Catalan: Guàrdia Urbana
South Africa	Municipal Police	
Switzerland	Municipal Police	French: Police municipale; German: Stadtpolizei, Gemeindepolizei, Regionalpolizei; Romansh: Polizia Cumûnala; Italian: Polizia Municipale
Tunisia	Municipal Police	Arabic: الشرطة البلدية
Turkey	Municipal Police	Turkish: Belediye Zabıtası
Ukraine	Municipal guard	Ukrainian: Муніципальна варта
United States	Municipal police departments (city, town, and village)	
Vietnam	Municipal police of Ha Noi City, Ho Chi Minh City, Hai Phong City, Da Nang City and Can Tho City	

== See also ==
- Code enforcement
- County police
- Garde champêtre
- Gemeindepolizei (Nazi Germany)
- Guardia Urbana
- Metropolitan police
- Police area
- Provincial police (Italy)
