= Garde champêtre =

Rural law enforcement in France

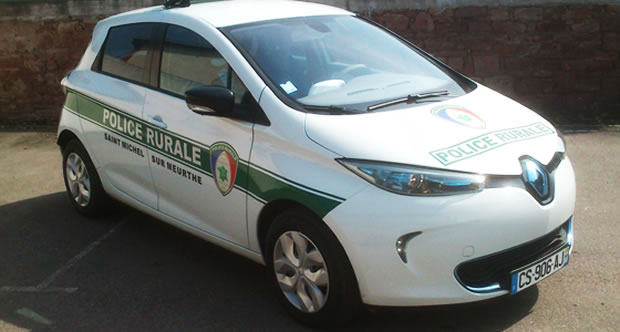
Renault électrique "Zoé" of the police rurale

A garde champêtre (lit. 'rural guard') is the combination of a forest ranger, game warden and code enforcement officer in certain rural communes in France.

== Organization ==
Their job is to report to the local mayor. Many of these officers carry firearms (they commonly face poachers, many of whom are themselves armed) and other weapons. Mayors decide which weapons to provide them with, but gardes champêtres can purchase, retain and carry a much wider range of weapons than the urban police (police municipale) are allowed. They are not under the supervision of the Gendarmerie but under the mayor's, their employer.

== History and future development ==
From 1791 to 1958 it was compulsory for each rural commune to employ a garde champêtre. Since then many formerly rural communes are heavily or totally urbanised and the number in post has been shrinking every year. A draft law in 2014, provided for the integration of the remaining gardes champêtres with the police municipale and the highway control officers (agents de surveillance de la voie publique) into a new police territoriale.

== Uniforms and rank insignia ==
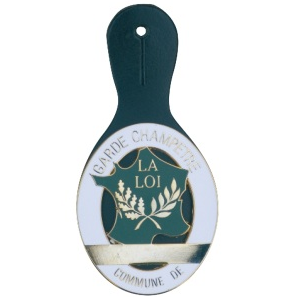
Metal badge

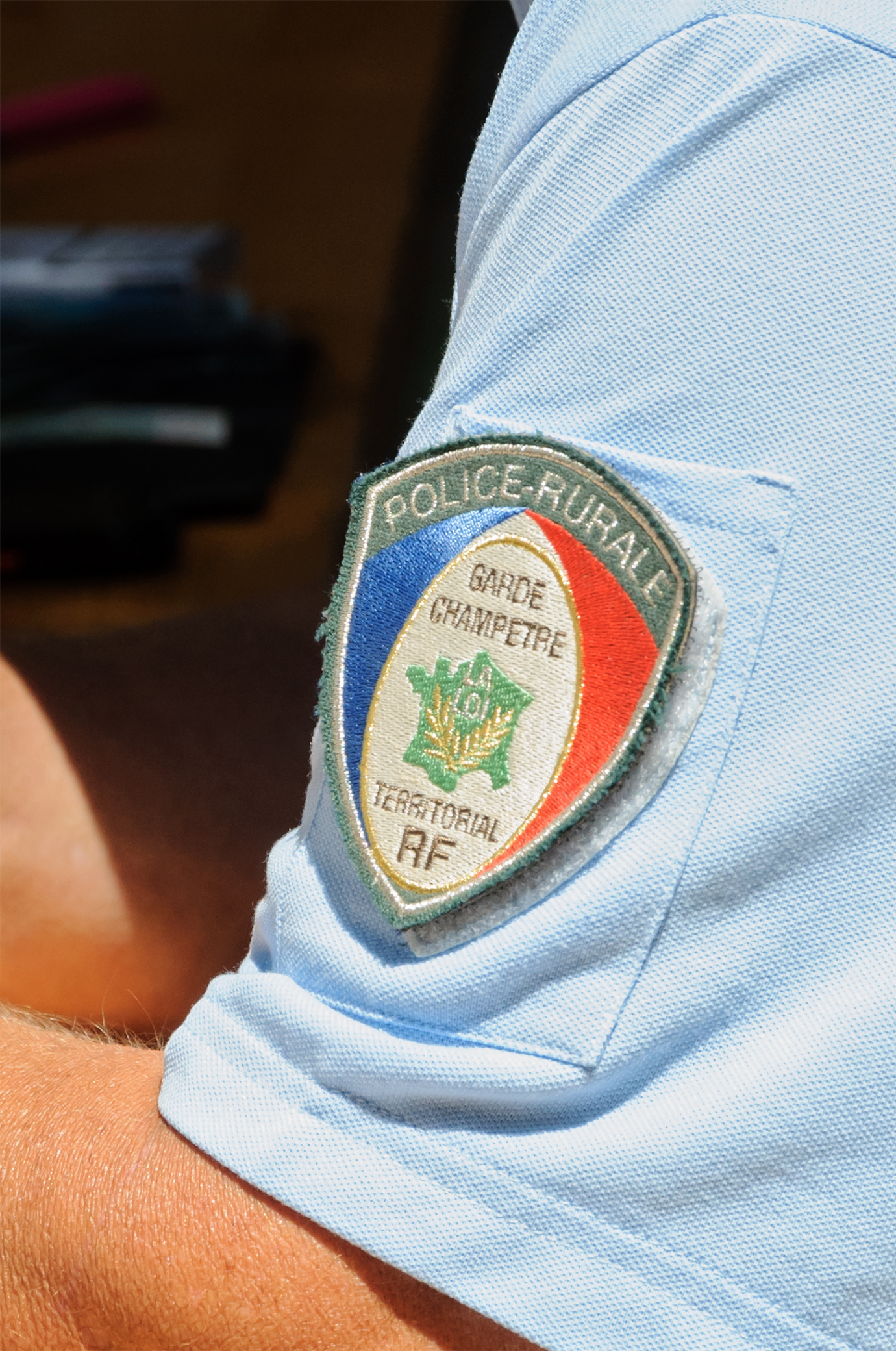
Cloth patch

Their uniforms are not regulated and are at the mayor's discretion; they are traditionally green. The only compulsory element of their dress is a metal badge or cloth patch bearing the words: "LA LOI" (the law), the name of the commune and that of the garde champêtre. They cannot legally wear the dress attributed to the police municipale (navy blue with a light blue trimming).

Police ranks of French Rural Police
| Insignia (2017–Present) | | | | |
| Rank (2017–Present) | Garde champêtre chef principal | Garde champêtre chef | | |
| English | Senior Chief Rural Warden | Chief Rural Warden | | |
| Insignia (2012–2017) | | | | |
| Rank (2012–2017) | Garde champêtre chef principal | Garde champêtre chef | Garde champêtre principal titulaire | Garde champêtre principal stagiaire |
| English | Senior Chief Rural Warden | Chief Rural Warden | Rural Warden | Trainee Rural Warden |
| Insignia (–2012) | | | | |
| Rank (–2012) | Garde champêtre chef principal | Garde champêtre chef | Garde champêtre principal | Garde champêtre stagiaire |
| English | Senior Chief Rural Warden | Chief Rural Warden | Rural Warden | Trainee Rural Warden |

== See also ==
- Council ranger
