= Municipal police (Austria) =

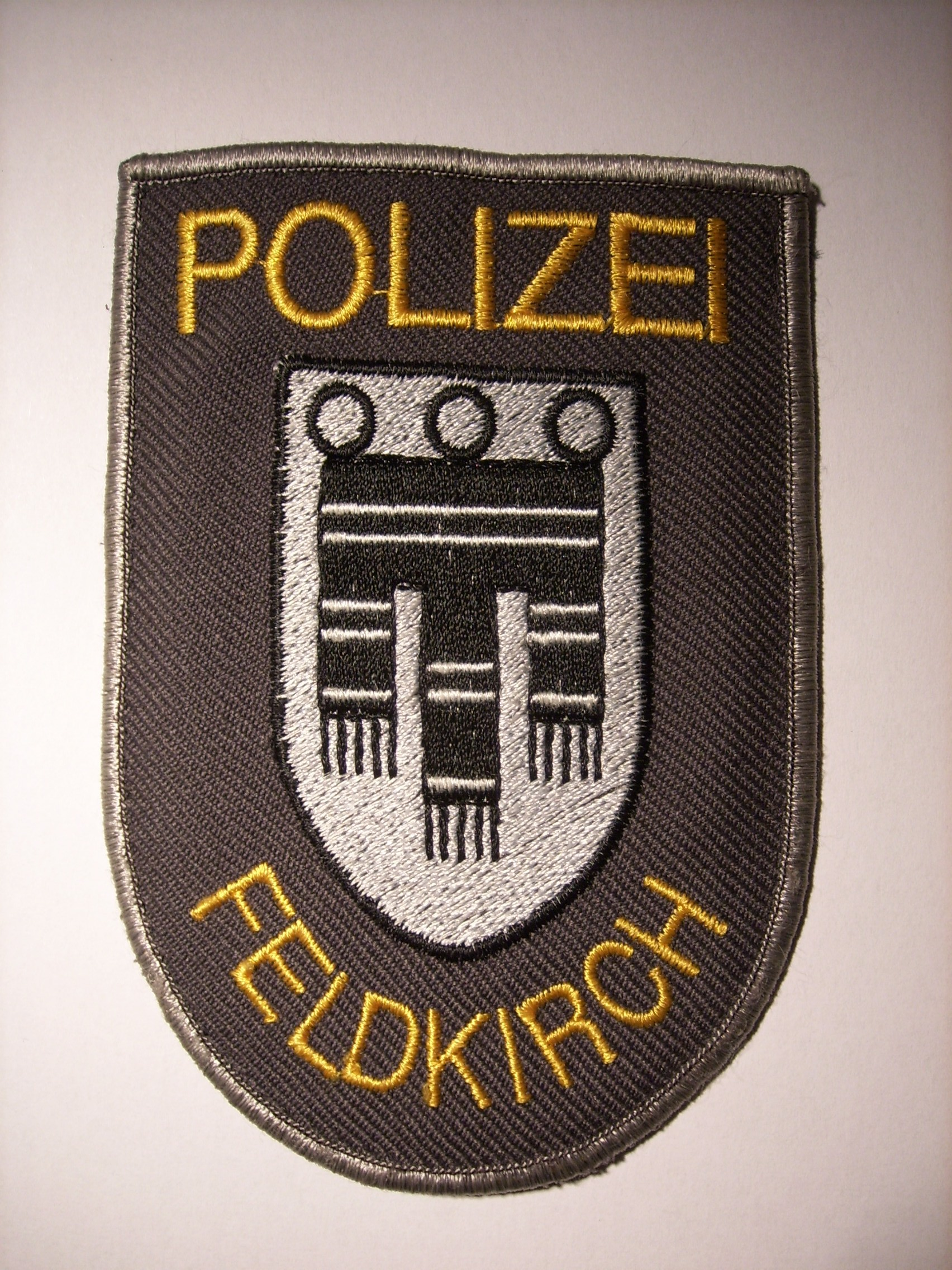

The municipal security guards (German: Gemeindesicherheitswachen) existing in about 40 Austrian municipalities are police forces besides the Austrian Federal Police. They may also be called city security guard (Städtische Sicherheitswache), municipal police (Gemeindepolizei), local police (Ortspolizei) or city police (Stadtpolizei). The larger of these forces form municipal guard corps (Gemeindewachkörper; official translation: municipal constabularies) with competences equal to the Federal Police. Some municipalities, including most statutory cities, are not allowed to maintain a guard corps.

== Legal basis ==
The Austrian Constitution allows municipalities to maintain a security force to enforce the laws and regulations, which are usually carried out by local authorities (local security police).

As the Federal Police, this legal body is formally an auxiliary body of the administrative authority as well. Exceeding the municipal territory is only permitted, if necessary measures could otherwise not be set in time; such interlocutory action must be reported immediately to the Federal Police. The Security Police Act of 1999 expanded the competencies of the local authorities.

However, Gemeindewachkörper in the sense of the constitution can only be those municipal police forces which have a certain manpower. For this reason, micro-departments with only one member of staff are legally not designated as municipal guard corps, but as "simple municipal guards".

== Importance ==
The existence of municipal guard corps is generally understood as a concession of the federal parliament to the security requirements of the Austrian States (Land), due to the fact, that there is no state police allowed.

In order to avoid a weakening of the security competences of the federal administration as far as possible, which would have been the case by setting up a state police, the municipalities were given security-related tasks.

Municipal guard corps have existed since the beginning of the First Republic of Austria. They were increasingly established where they were found to be necessary due to the tourist situation, such as in some spa resorts.

Above all in the western states of Tyrol and Vorarlberg, where the focus is set on federalism and self-determination, the number of municipalities is relatively higher than in Eastern Austria. In all the states except the Burgenland, Vienna and Carinthia, there are city police forces.

In May 2009, the Federal Chancellery expressed constitutional concerns about the plan of the Montafon municipal association in Vorarlberg to establish its own security guards. According to the Federal Chancellery, this is only for individual communities, but not for associations.

Municipal police forces have the same independence as the Federal Police, which is subordinated to the Interior Minister. Thus, the municipality's guards are usually subordinated to the mayor, who makes the decisions of the personnel and can issue directives.

== Distinctions between law enforcement authorities ==
Apart from personal reservations and differences between members of the local authorities and the Federal Police, it is not legal in some municipalities to set up municipal guard corps (municipal constabularies).

That concerns municipalities in which the Federal Police is at the same time the security authority (usually statutory cities; Article 78d (2) of the Federal Constitution). Thus the frequently expressed political desire of city guards (in German Stadtwache) in Vienna, Graz and Linz is prohibited by the clear regulation of the Federal Constitution.

Some cities circumvent this regulation by setting up Code enforcement units (in German: Ordnungsamt, Ordnungswache, Ordnungsdienst) or private security companies. For this reason, the Ordnungsamt Klagenfurt, the Ordnungswache Graz, the Traffic Watch in Vienna or the Order Guards in Wels are not community police forces, but special institutions whose exact design and their powers differ strongly from city to city.

The Ordnungsdienst in Linz (Ordnungsdienst der Stadt Linz GmbH) was set up as limited liability company and thus works as a private security service.

== Equipment and uniforms ==
By 2012, the Federal Police and the local authorities had some small differences on their uniforms.

These prohibitions have now been lifted. On the other hand, officials of the Federal Police are still not allowed to wear their ward or district coat of arms on their uniforms.

On the other hand, the officials of the municipal police, instead of the Federal Police, carry the municipal coat-of-arms with the appropriate inscription on the uniform jackets. On the distinctions is mostly the coat of arms of the city league.

In the purchase of the equipment, the municipalities are basically free and not bound to any specifications. However, most of the community police officers carry the uniforms used by the Federal Police.

An exception is, for example, the Baden city police, who obtain their uniforms from the LZN (Logistik Zentrum Niedersachsen) in Hann. Münden, Germany. The uniforms are identical to those of the state police forces from Hamburg, Bremen, Schleswig-Holstein, and Lower Saxony.

The most common sidearm that is utilized by municipal police is the Glock 17 9x19mm pistol.

== Vehicles ==
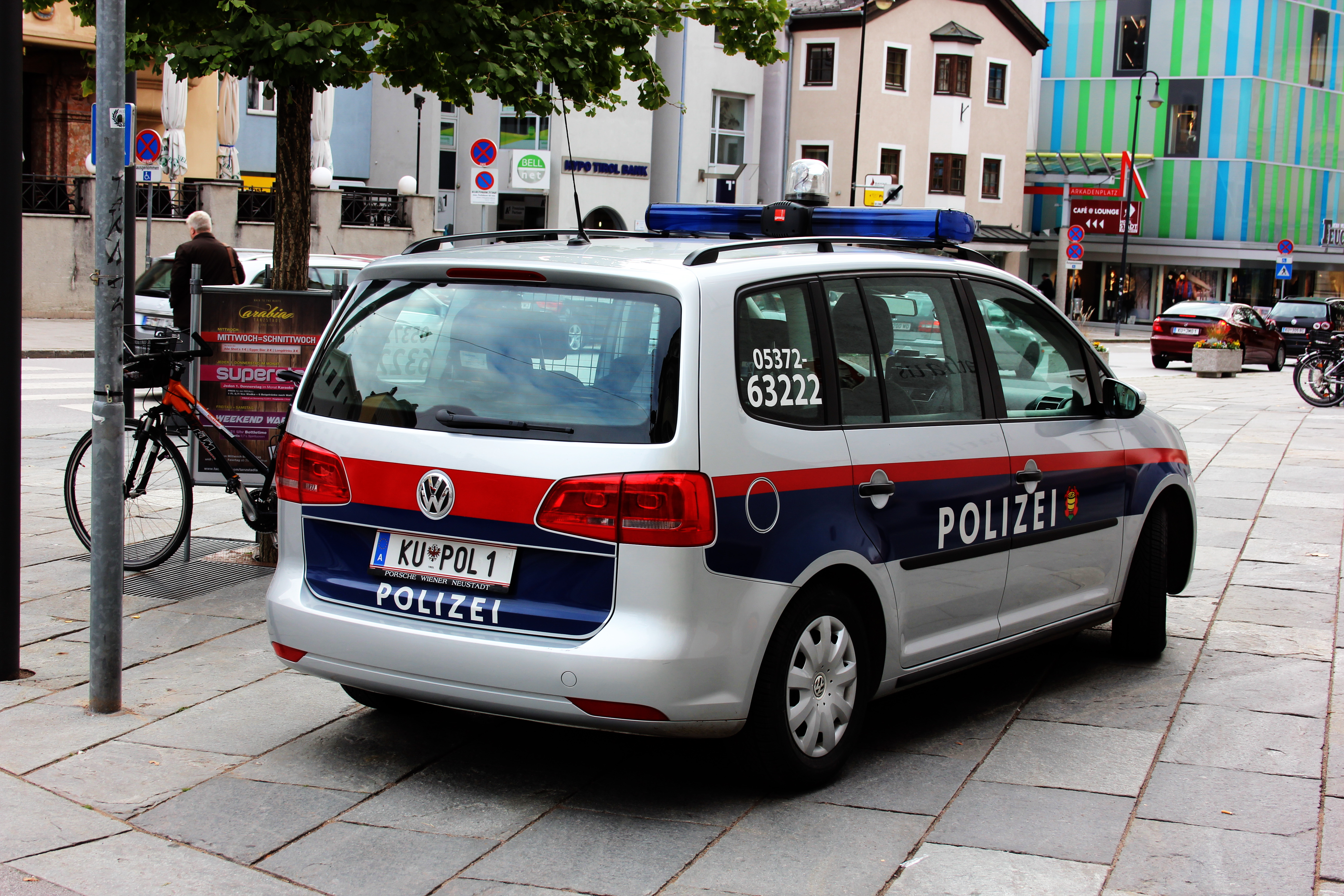

The vehicles of the city police forces do not have special number plates like the Federal Police. They carry ordinary number plates of the respective district. The federal insignia is not shown on the vehicles. However, the communal coat of arms is often appropriate.

== Municipalities with city police forces ==
The states of Vorarlberg and Tyrol have the largest number of municipal police forces in Austria. One third of all 313 municipal police officers in Austria work in Vorarlberg. This is largely due to the fact that this state is the only one which provides financial support for the formation of city police forces.

=== Lower Austria ===
- Amstetten: established in 1873, official denomination: Stadtpolizei (city police), 6 officers
- Baden: established in 1811, official denomination: Stadtpolizei (city police), largest Stadtpolizei in Austria, more than 40 officers
- Gmünd: established in 1887, official denomination: Stadtpolizei (city police), 1 officer; first police car purchased in 2019
- Neunkirchen: established in 1869, official denomination: Stadtpolizei (city police), 9 officers

=== Upper Austria ===
- Bad Ischl: official denomination: Stadtpolizei (city police), 7 officers
- Braunau am Inn: official denomination: Stadtpolizei (city police), 11 officers
- Gmunden: official denomination: Stadtpolizei (city police), 11 officers
- Ried im Innkreis: official denomination: Sicherheitswache (security guard), 11 officers
- Schärding: official denomination: Stadtpolizei (city police), 2 officers
- Traun: official denomination: Stadtpolizei (city police), 9 officers
- Vöcklabruck: established in 1898, official denomination: Stadtpolizei (city police), 7 officers

=== Salzburg ===
- Hallein: established in 1862, official denomination: Stadtpolizei (city police), 9 officers
- Zell am See: established in 2018, official denomination: Stadtpolizei (city police), 5 officers

=== Styria ===
- Fürstenfeld: 1 officer
- Kapfenberg: official denomination: Stadtpolizei (city police), 17 officers
- Weiz: official denomination: Stadtpolizei (city police), 4 officers

=== Tyrol ===
- Hall in Tirol: official denomination: Stadtpolizei (city police), 4 officers
- Imst: official denomination: Stadtpolizei (city police), 3 officers
- Kitzbühel: official denomination: Stadtpolizei (city police), 3 officers
- Kufstein: official denomination: Stadtpolizei (city police), 12 officers
- Landeck: official denomination: Stadtpolizei (city police), 2 officers
- Mayrhofen: official denomination: Gemeindepolizei (community police), 3 officers
- Schwaz: official denomination: Stadtpolizei (city police), 4 officers
- Sölden: official denomination: Gemeindepolizei (community police), 1 officer
- St. Anton am Arlberg: 1 officer
- Wattens: official denomination: Gemeindepolizei (community police), 2 officers
- Wörgl: official denomination: Stadtpolizei (city police), 7 officers

=== Vorarlberg ===
- Bludenz: official denomination: Städtische Sicherheitswache (municipal security guard), 9 officers
- Bregenz: established in the beginning of the 19th century, official denomination: Stadtpolizei (city police), 21 officers
- Dornbirn: official denomination: Stadtpolizei (city police), 27 officers
- Feldkirch: official denomination: Stadtpolizei (city police), 22 officers
- Götzis: official denomination: Gemeindesicherheitswache (community security guard), 2 officers
- Hard: established in 2020, official denomination: Gemeindepolizei (community police), 2 officers
- Hohenems: official denomination: Stadtpolizei (city police), 2 officers
- Lustenau: official denomination: Sicherheitswache (security guard), 7 officers
- Mittelberg: official denomination: Sicherheitswache (security guard)
- Rankweil: official denomination: Ortspolizei (local police), 3 officers

== Projected municipal police forces ==
=== Salzburg ===
- Bischofshofen

=== Vorarlberg ===
- Höchst

== See also ==
- Law enforcement in Austria
- Stadtpolizei
- Municipal police
