= Nuisance abatement =

Regulatory compliance methodology

Nuisance abatement is a growing area within policing and code enforcement. The term refers to using building codes, fire codes, zoning, etc. in order to improve the quality of life and resolve life safety issues within neighborhoods. Nuisance abatement programs are most often a component of problem oriented or community policing programs. In most Canadian jurisdictions, bylaw enforcement officers handle nuisance abatement.

In England and Wales, "abatement of nuisance" is a legal self-help procedure whereby any victim of a private nuisance may take steps (without seeking the court's approval) to deal with the problem. (Note: For instance, although English law does not give an occupier of land a "right to light", he was a right to peaceful enjoyment of the property. If the branches of a neighbour's tree grows over his land, a person may cut down the offending part of the branch. The branch must then be returned to the neighbour, who remains its owner.)

== Communities ==
Nuisance Abatement programs exists in a number of communities and are organized at the city, county and state levels.

=== Albuquerque, New Mexico ===
The City of Albuquerque features a task force of members drawn from various city agencies known as the Safe City Strike Force. The Albuquerque program's goals include enforcement of City codes and ordinances; such as housing code enforcement, dogs, graffiti vandalism prosecution, vehicle forfeiture proceedings, and Metropolitan Court Arraignment Program.

=== Connecticut ===
The State of Connecticut features a specialized unit in the Asset Forfeiture Bureau of the Office of the Chief State's Attorney. Their Nuisance Abatement program combines civil remedies and innovative problem solving with traditional policing and criminal prosecution to address the quality of life in communities throughout Connecticut. In Norwalk, Connecticut the law was utilized to close four venues several years earlier as it was adopted at the local level. As of October 2013, additional cities were not enforcing this standard and there had not been any evidence that criminal acts did not transform themselves to bypass this law enforcement method.

=== Denver, Colorado ===
Denver, best known for being the first to implement the wheel clamp, expanded its towing ventures with the Public Nuisance Abatement Ordinance. This ordinance authorizes police officers to immediately confiscate physical property involved in any alleged crime, then gives the alleged perpetrator the ability to sign a civil stipulation and pay a fine in order to get their vehicle back within a month, rather than the 6–12 months spent waiting for their possible criminal trial. An investigation in 2017 by Denver's KDVR News suggested that the ordinance had primarily been a money grab by the city, with 1,821 alleged perpetrators having paid Denver $2.4 million to expedite the return of their confiscated vehicles in 2016, though only five of them were ever found guilty of an actual crime; the Denver City Attorney rebutted that the then-20-year-old ordinance was an effective tool for nuisance abatement.

=== Gainesville, Florida ===
The Gainesville, Florida program centers around an administrative board that can impose fines and other non-criminal penalties on property owners for the activities that occur on their property which constitute a public nuisance. Violations of the Nuisance Abatement Ordinance are not criminal, and will not result in arrests, but are an addition to the criminal actions that will be taken.

=== Seattle, Washington ===
Aurora Avenue (U.S. Route 99) was once a bustling commercial thoroughfare and the main route into Seattle until I-5 bypassed this main street in 1968, sending the neighbourhood into decline and driving prices at a strip of twenty motels in one section of town to the point where they would become a temptingly-inexpensive base of operations for drug dealers and street prostitution, much to the dismay of local residents, businesses and neighbourhood-watch volunteers.

Like other municipalities, Seattle initially adopted a nuisance abatement strategy of attempting to shut down the most problematic motels under pretexts such as public health and fire safety violations or using taxation laws. In 2009, the city went further by adopting a "Chronic Nuisance Properties" ordinance penalising owners of businesses whose clientele had brought crime into a neighbourhood (as measured by the number of calls for service to police per 90-day or one-year period for an establishment) or allowing the city to revoke business licences and shut down a business entirely. There was no requirement that the owner actually be implicated in any alleged crimes; failure to keep criminal elements out of a tenement house, motel or other business constituted a nuisance for which the owner would be civically liable.

Of one locally-notorious group of five motels under common management, Seattle (Black Angus) Motor Inn was on leased land, after some success in using health code violations to shut it down temporarily it closed permanently after the owner of the land (not the management of the business) caved to pressure from City Hall; the Wallingford Inn was sold; the Isabella Motel and Italia Motel were closed as part of an out-of-court settlement of 152 criminal charges brought by the city for tax violations; the Fremont (Thunderbird) Inn was sold after foreclosure and ultimately demolished.

Other unrelated properties with many calls for police, including a residential tenement and a motel in the same area, had also been targeted using Seattle's "Chronic Nuisance Properties" ordinance but fared slightly better; by tightening security on-site and working with police to evict troublemakers, the owners were able to bring the number of calls for service down significantly.

=== Edmonton, Alberta ===
In Canada, the Edmonton Police Service in the province of Alberta implemented the now defunct Derelict Housing Unit. This unit consisted of one uniformed constable who was tasked with identifying relevant agencies to deal with problem addresses, where policing powers were not best suited to dealing with the issues present. Working on a referral basis, the police member would assess a problem address and contact the organization with the strongest legislation with which to deal with the concern. Police were responsible for providing a safe work environment, such as a health inspector assessing a known drug house, and ensuring that community stakeholders were apprised of any actions taken based on complaints made to the respective agencies. It was an extremely successful program that eventually met its demise due to budgetary restrictions and mismanagement at higher levels of administration.

=== San Francisco, California ===
In San Francisco, multiple departments work together to ensure safe neighborhoods through the use of nuisance abatement and other similar codes. The Department of Building Inspection is responsible for inspecting and citing violations of the building code, and their decisions are enforced by the City Attorney of San Francisco. California has passed protective laws to help tenants and others damaged by these nuisances to be justly compensated. For instance, California mandates a strong Implied Warranty of Habitability, which sets requirements which they deem appropriate. Also there are laws like Civil Code 1942.4 which says no landlord can collect rent once a city agency has requested nuisance abatement. The Department of Health Inspection also has a way to report and inspect possible codes violations and order the removal of the problem. An additional city agency who responds to such nuisances is the Planning Department, who can have a city planner inspect the nuisance and see if it violates city planning codes.

=== Los Angeles, California ===
Los Angeles' nuisance abatement program is Citywide Nuisance Abatement Program (CNAP). CNAP spearheads a number of specialized programs, including Taking Out Urban Gang Headquarters (TOUGH), Violence and Crime Activated Tenant Eviction (VACATE), Problem Properties Resolution Team (PPRT), and The Abandoned Building Task Force (ABTF).

=== Dallas, Texas ===
Dallas' nuisance abatement programs include code enforcement, led by municipal services and a criminal enforcement portion, led by The Dallas Police Department. The Dallas Police focus on rehabilitating high crime properties through recommendations to implement reasonable security measures. If property ownership refuses to implement reasonable measures, civil action may be taken against the property.

==== Media coverage ====
The concept of nuisance abatement received national recognition following the 2017 Pulitzer Prize for Public Service ceremony, in which both recipients—ProPublica and the New York Daily News—were awarded "for uncovering, primarily through the work of reporter Sarah Ryley, widespread abuse of eviction rules by the police to oust hundreds of people, most of them poor minorities."
