= Municipal police (Germany) =

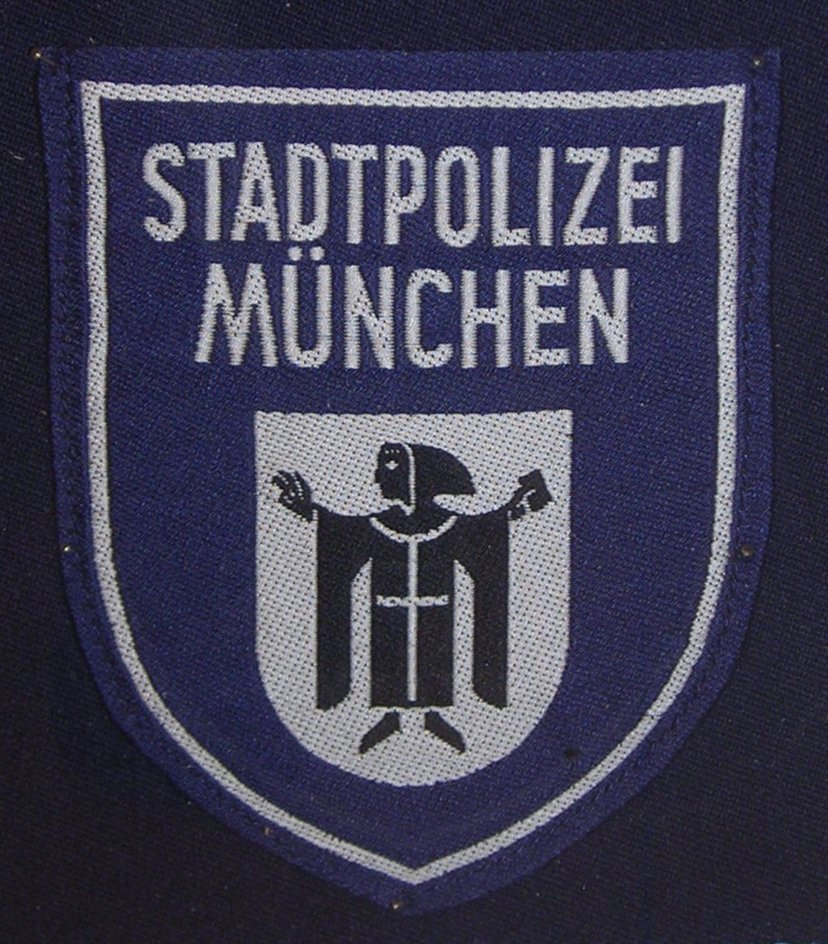
Historic patch of the former Munich City Police

Stadtpolizei were municipal police forces of some cities in Germany. The term Stadtpolizei is still used in some German states to denote local order enforcement offices of municipal authorities with limited police powers.

== History ==
After 1945, there were many local and city police forces, such as the Munich Police Force, throughout Germany. Small towns and rural areas that could not or did not want to afford their own police force were covered by the Landpolizei which was a rural police force organised by the state government. This decentralised system was forced by the US/British-Military Governments after World War II.

However, it was not effective in fighting the rise of organised crime and terrorism (Baader-Meinhof/RAF). So the local and city police forces were merged with the rural gendarmeries (German: Landpolizei, Landjägerei or Gendarmerie) to form the state police forces (German: Landespolizei) in every single state, during the major reorganisation of the German police in the mid-seventies.

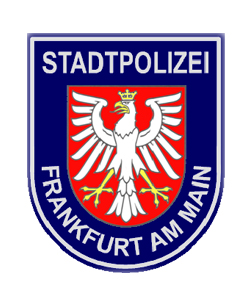
Current patch of the Stadtpolizei Frankfurt

In Bavaria, municipalities with a population of at least 5,000 were allowed to have their own police forces. A total of 151 city police forces existed in Bavaria. The city police forces, including the Munich city police, were consolidated into Bavarian State Police in 1975.

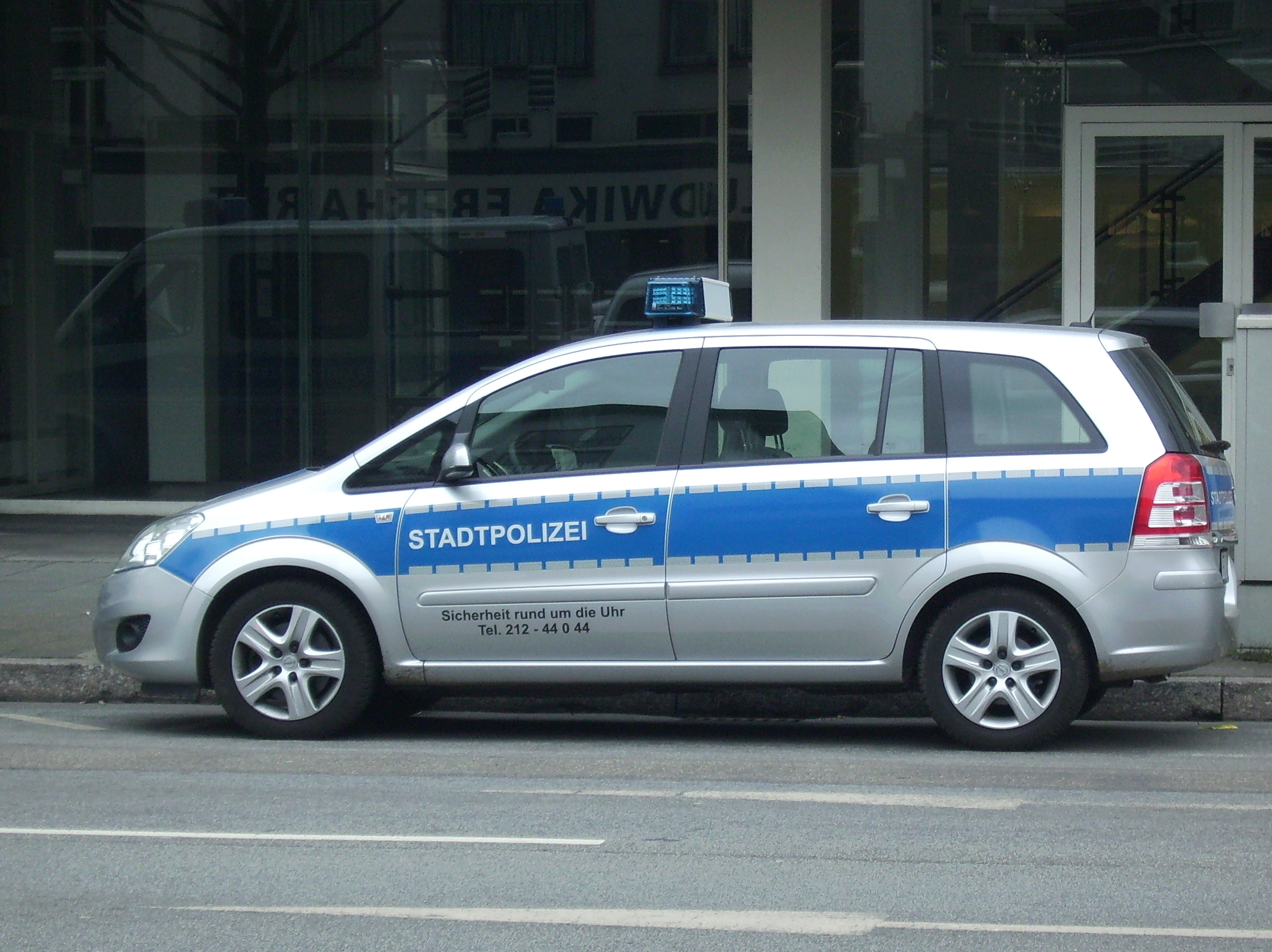
Car of the Stadtpolizei in Frankfurt

In Baden-Württemberg, cities with population at least 75,000 were allowed to have their own municipal police forces. In 1968, the population requirement was increased to 250,000, thus restricting it to the three largest cities of the state - Stuttgart, Mannheim and Karlsruhe. Mannheim and Karlsruhe police forces were consolidated into the Baden-Württemberg Police in 1972, and Stuttgart in 1973.

== Municipal law enforcement ==
=== City police forces ===
In few states however (for example Bremen, Saarland, Baden-Württemberg) municipal police officers do have the same rights, powers and obligations like their counterparts in the state police. This is particularly the case in the state of Baden-Württemberg. Municipal Police Officers in Baden-Württemberg can use force, make an arrest, regulate traffic, ask for identification, search a person, investigate misdemeanours and contravention for the state prosecutor among others. The tasks of a municipal police force depends on the size of the municipality's territory and the number of inhabitants in which it is operating. The so-called "police authority" (German: Polizeibehörde) of a town or city can transfer more tasks and responsibilities to its police force, only if approved from the regional government (Regierungspräsidium).

In the state of Hesse, communities are allowed to implement and maintain a city or community police force (German: Stadtpolizei or Kommunalpolizei) for general law enforcement duties.

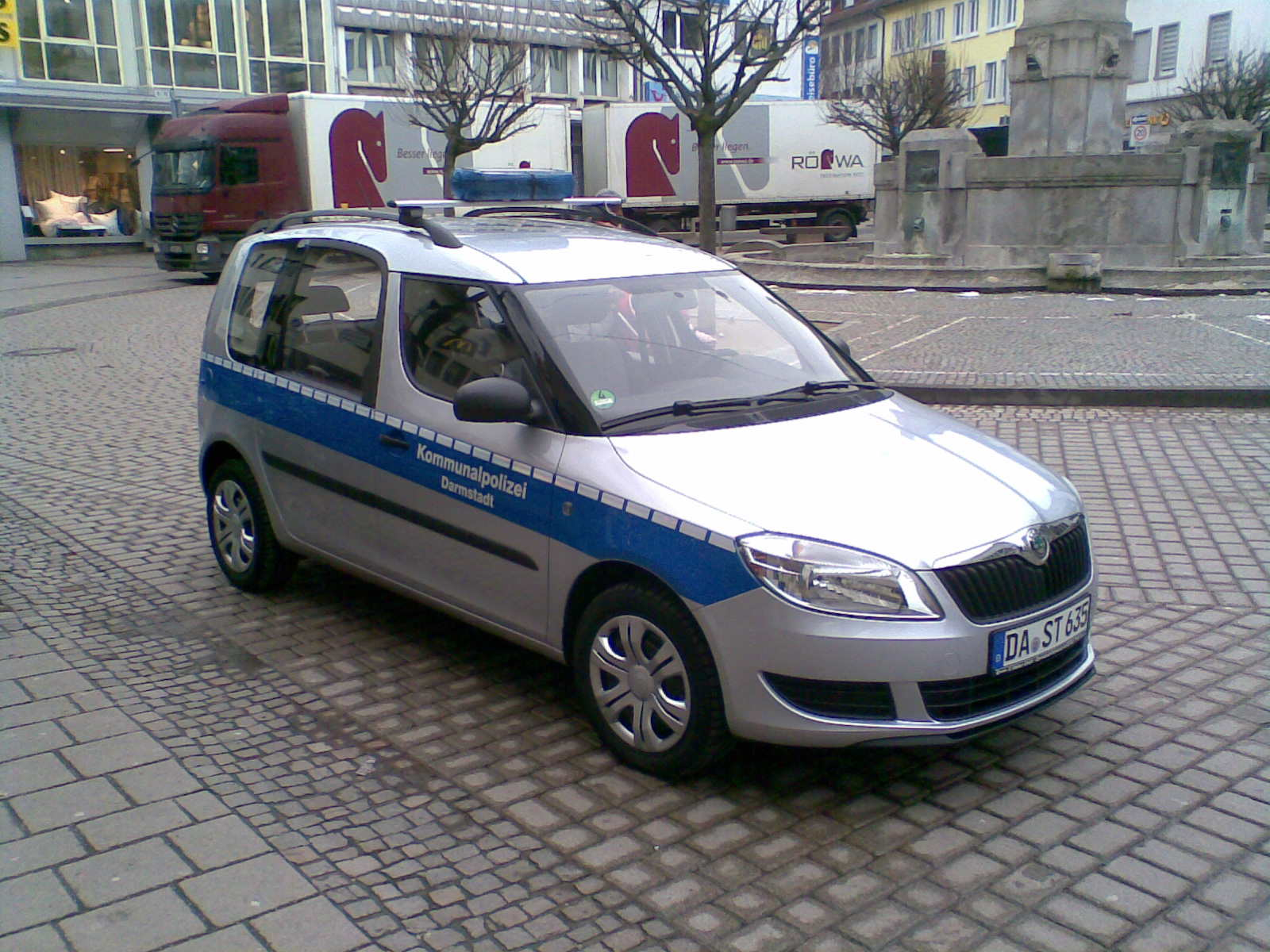
Patrol vehicle of the Kommunalpolizei Darmstadt

=== Municipal order enforcement ===
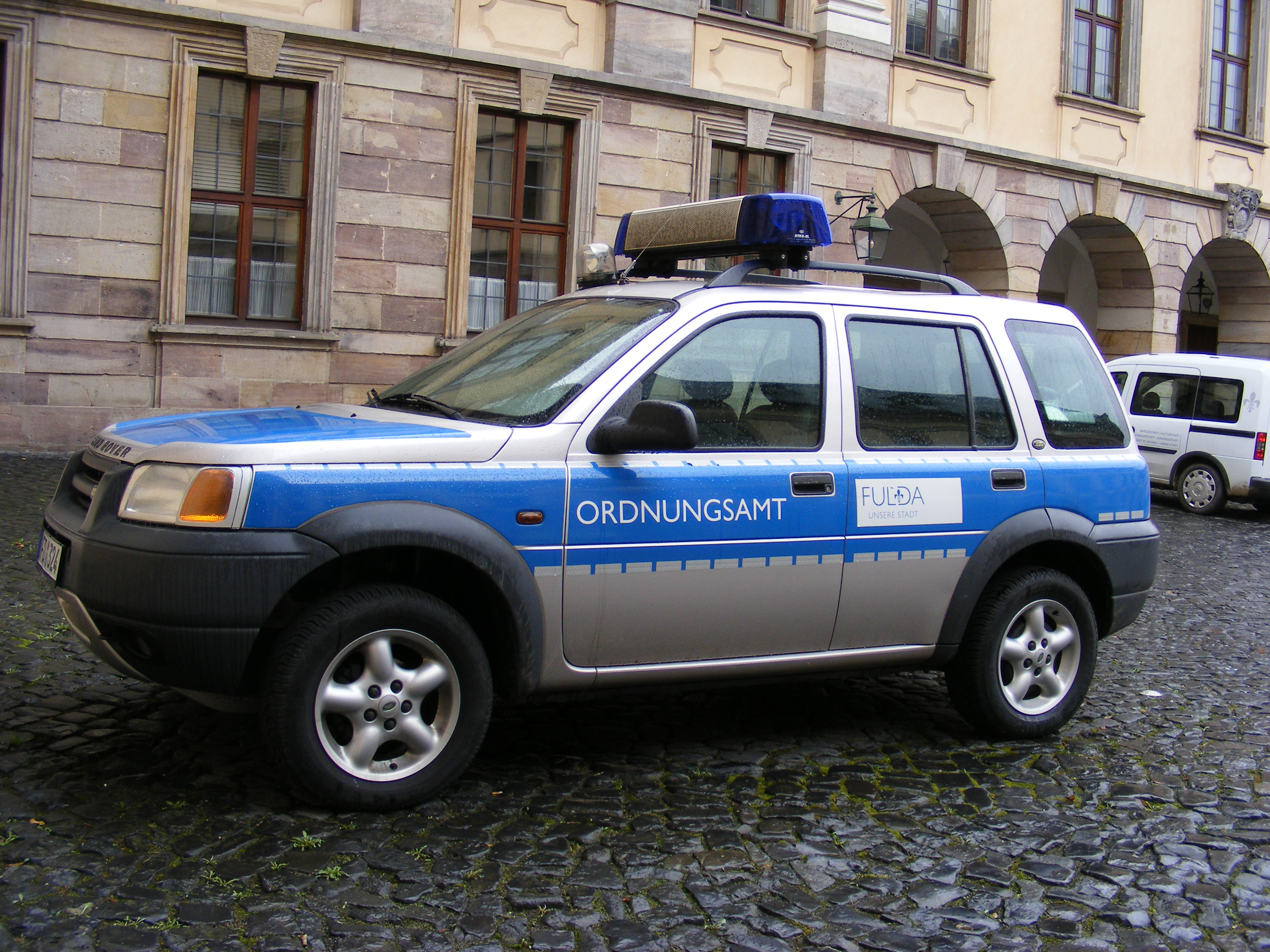
Patrol car of the Ordnungsamt of the city of Fulda

Currently, many cities in Germany have established local order enforcement offices. Depending on each state's laws, under different terms like Ordnungsamt (order enforcement office), Kommunaler Ordnungsdienst (municipal order enforcement service), Städtischer Ordnungsdienst (city order enforcement service), Gemeindevollzugsdienst (municipal code enforcement office).

These city employees mainly wear police-like uniforms but some wear labelled jackets and plain clothes. They are the municipal administration's eyes and ears on the street. Depending on each state's laws, these local employees could be armed or unarmed. Mostly they are charged with monitoring municipal by-laws and laws that fall under the responsibility of municipalities, which include monitoring the conduct of shop owners, sanitation inspections, veterinary inspections and minor infractions and misdemeanors such as illegal parking, littering, state and local dog regulations etc. They usually only hand out warnings and fines and can only perform a citizen's arrest as any other citizen can. If they see any major crimes they are required to call the state police.

== See also ==
- Law enforcement in Germany
- Federal Police (Germany)
- Landespolizei
- Gemeindesicherheitswache
- Municipal police

Crime:

- Crime in Germany
