= Local Police (Romania) =

Local police of Romania

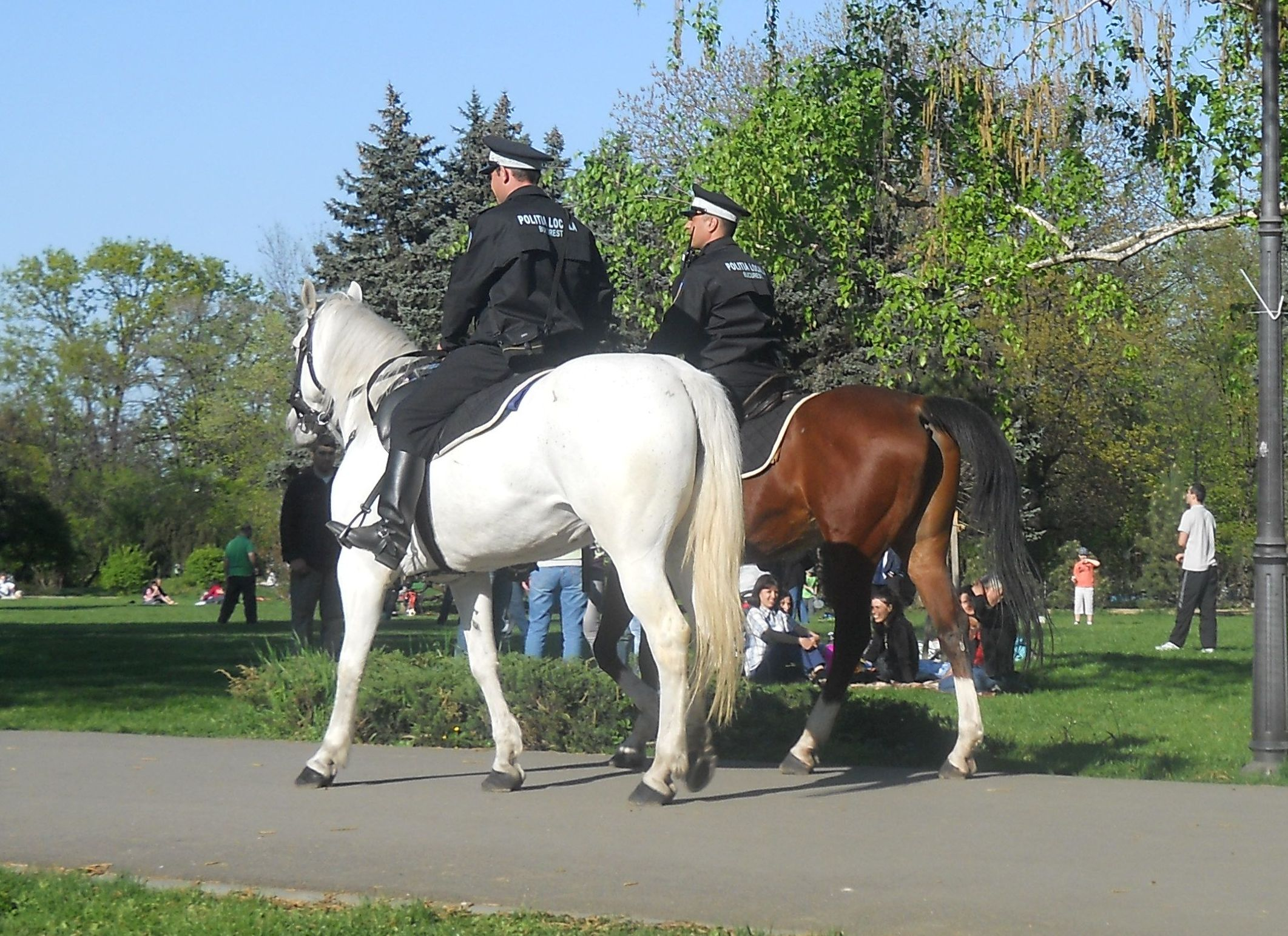
Mounted police in King Michael I Park, Bucharest

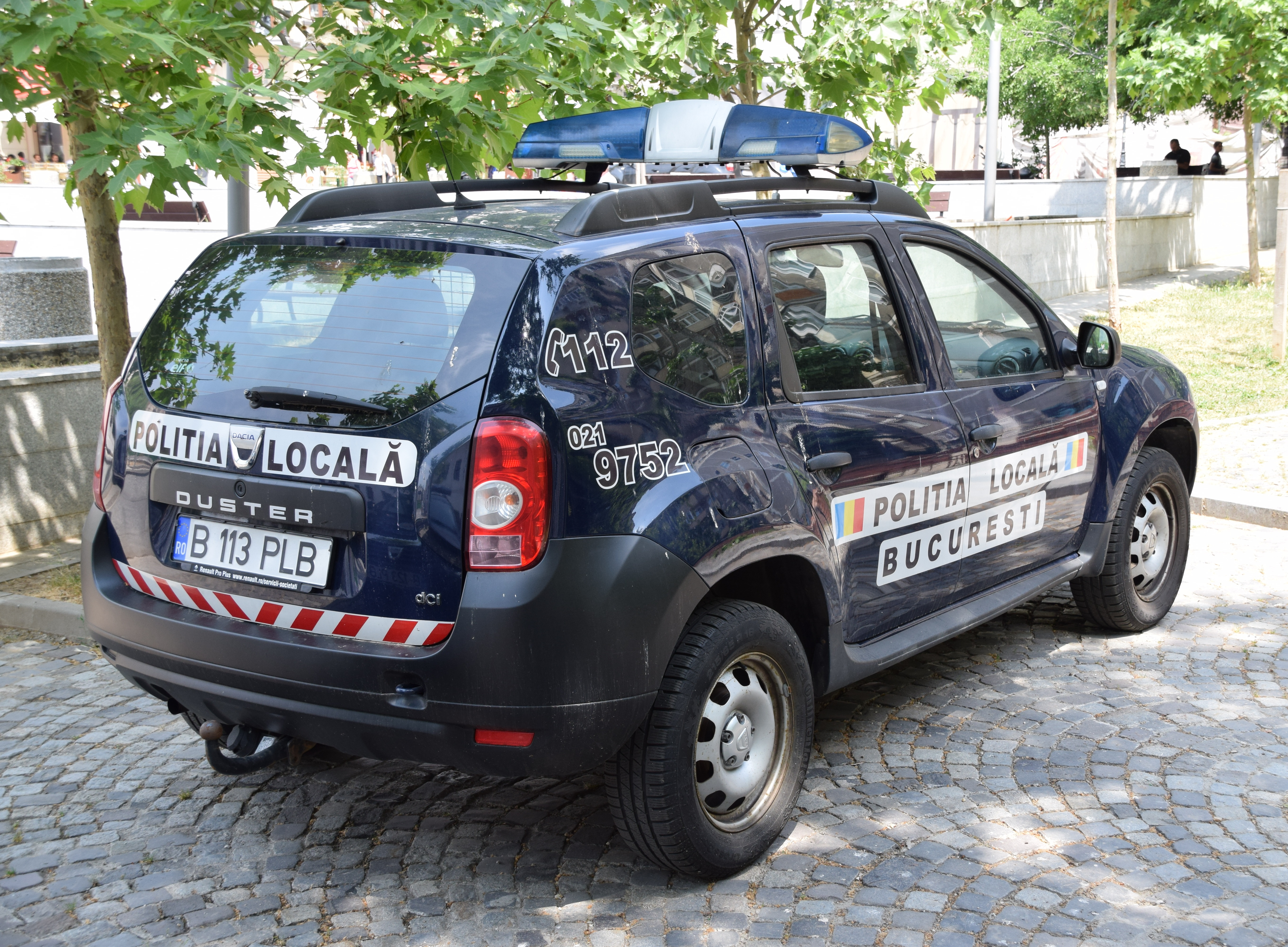
Dacia Duster of the Bucharest Local Police

The Local Police, (Romanian: Poliția Locală, Romanian pronunciation: [poliˈt͡si.a loˈkalə]) of Romania is a public institution of local interest, operating under the authority of local councils and mayoralties, and is completely independent of the Romanian Police structures (which fall under the Ministry of Internal Affairs). The legal framework explicitly delimits the two organizations, separating the local administrative duties of the Local Police from the national law enforcement, judicial, and criminal investigation powers reserved for the Romanian Police. It was established in 2011 under Law No. 155/2010 through the reorganization of the Public Guardians Corps and the Community Police.

== Main Duties of the Local Police ==
In accordance with Law 155/2010, the Local Police exercises its duties exclusively in the following specific areas established by law:

- Public order and peace: Maintaining order in parks, pedestrian zones, markets, and near schools.
- Public road traffic: Supervising local traffic, checking maximum authorized weights on communal/town roads, and penalizing illegal stopping, standing, and parking.
- Construction discipline and street signage: Checking building permits and ensuring compliance with street advertising regulations.
- Environmental protection: Verifying waste management and compliance with local cleanliness standards by citizens and businesses.
- Commercial activity: Checking the legality of commercial documents, markets, and outdoor patios, as well as enforcing shop operating hours.
- Identity registration: Assisting authorities in bringing individuals without valid identity documents into legal compliance.

== Rights and Limits in Relation to Citizens ==
Local police officers have the legal right to request identification from individuals when there are indications that they have violated legal regulations within their scope of competence (e.g., disturbing the peace, illegal parking, illegal street vending). They can issue minor offense sanctions (fines or warnings) exclusively for the areas mentioned above. The Local Police does not have the right to conduct residential searches, intercept communications, or investigate criminal cases. If they witness a flagrant crime, they are required by law to detain the perpetrator and hand them over immediately to the competent structures of the Romanian Police.

== See also ==
- Municipal police
- Romanian Police
- Romanian Gendarmerie
