= Code enforcement =

Local government agency type

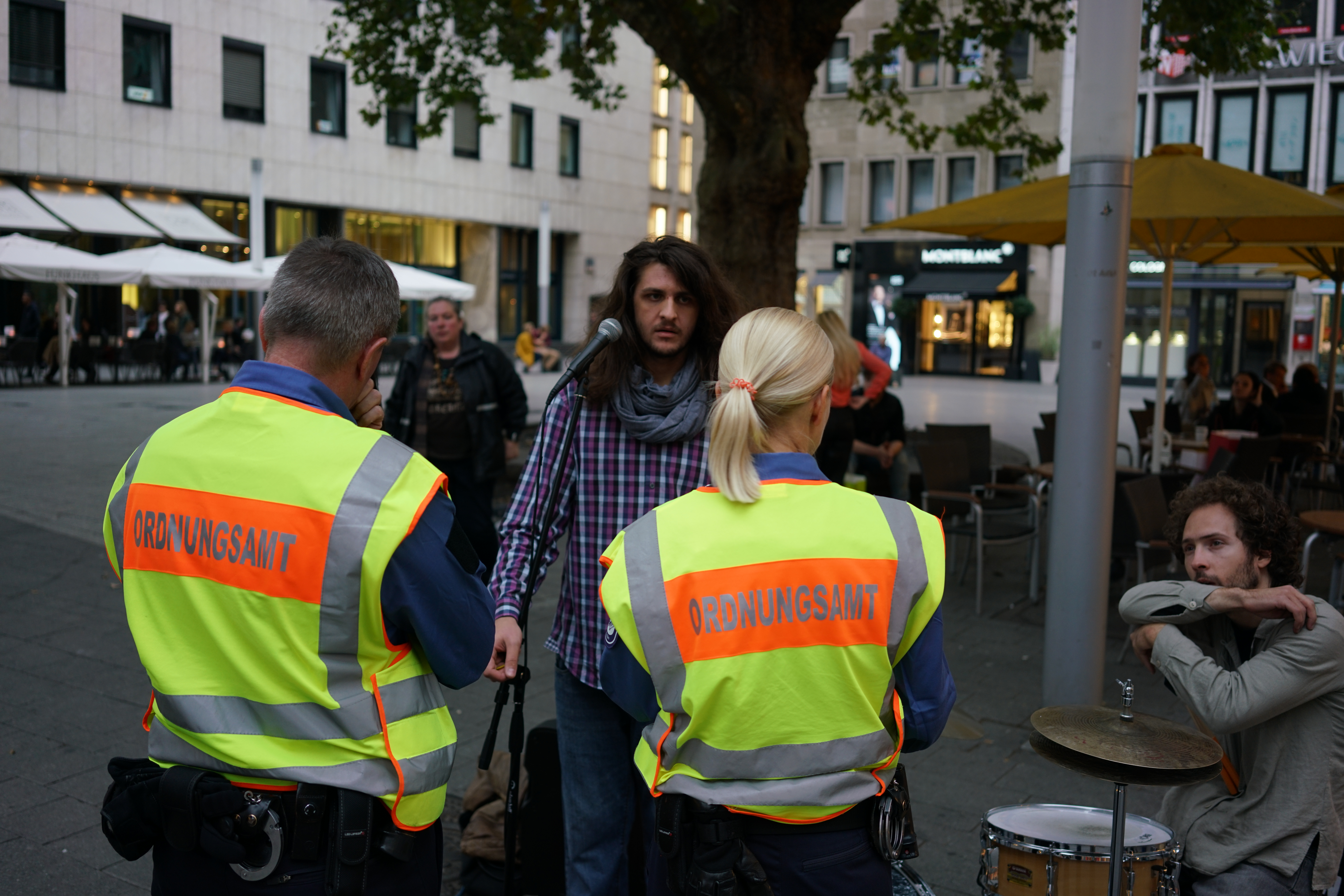
Ordnungsamt officers in Cologne, Germany

Bylaw enforcement patch from Delta, British Columbia

Code enforcement, sometimes encompassing law enforcement, is the act of enforcing a set of rules, principles, or laws (especially written ones) and ensuring observance of a system of norms or customs. An authority usually enforces a civil code, a set of rules, or a body of laws and compel those subject to their authority to behave in a certain way.

A bylaw enforcement officer (also called municipal law enforcement or municipal enforcement) is an employee of a municipality, county or regional district, charged with the enforcement of local ordinance—bylaws, laws, codes, or regulations enacted by local governments. Bylaw enforcement officers often work closely with police and other law enforcement agencies, but are generally not considered emergency services.

== Types ==
Various persons and organizations ensure compliance with laws and rules, including:

- Building inspector, an official who is charged with ensuring that construction is in compliance with local codes.
- Fire marshal, an official who is both a police officer and a firefighter and enforces a fire code.
- Health inspector, an official who is charged with ensuring that restaurants meet local health codes.
- Police forces, charged with maintaining public order, crime prevention, and enforcing criminal law.
- Zoning enforcement officer, an official who is charged with enforcing the zoning code of a local jurisdiction, such as a municipality or county.
- Parking enforcement officer, an official who is charged with enforcing street parking regulations.

== Commonwealth countries ==
In Canada and some other Commonwealth countries, the term Bylaw Enforcement Officer is more commonly used, as well as Municipal Law Enforcement Officer or Municipal Enforcement Officer. In the United Kingdom, Australia and New Zealand, various names are used, but the word warden is commonly used for various classes of non-police enforcement personnel (such as game warden, traffic warden, park warden).

=== Australia ===
In Australia, the terms law enforcement officer, shire ranger and local laws officer are used for general-duty bylaw enforcement, traffic officer for parking enforcement only, and animal management officer (formerly known as ranger or council ranger) for animal-related enforcement.

=== Canada ===
Shoulder flash of a Coquitlam bylaw officer.

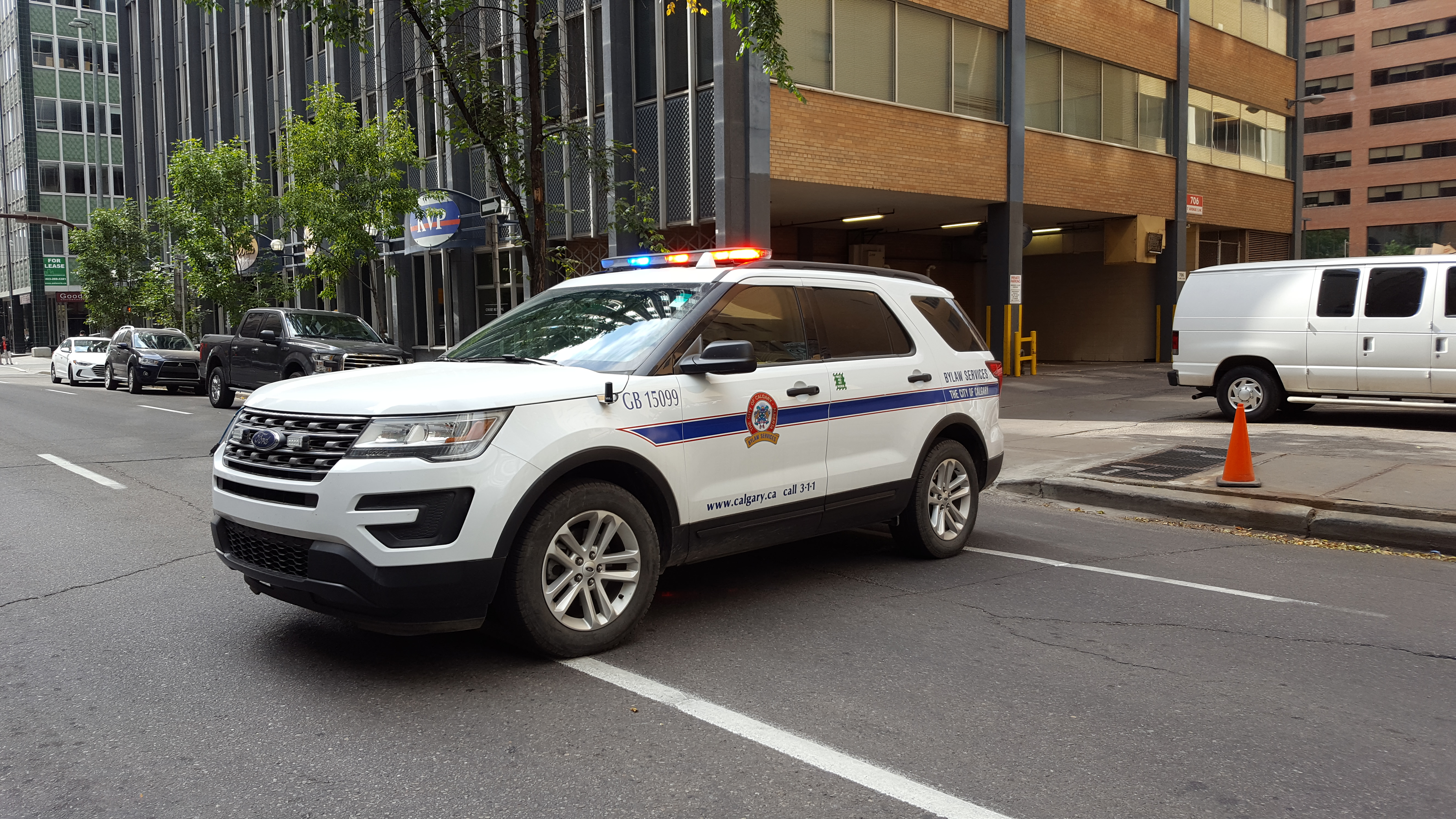
A Calgary Bylaw Services car blocks the road during the 2017 Calgary Pride Parade.

In Canada, municipal law enforcement officers are generally referred to as bylaw enforcement officers. Every municipality in Canada is authorized to develop and enforce municipal by-laws, but each province and territory regulates the authority of municipal law enforcement officers differently.

In the Canadian province of Ontario, bylaw enforcement officers are generally titled municipal law enforcement officers, and in Newfoundland and Labrador, Alberta and the Northwest Territories, the term municipal enforcement officer is also used.

Rather than operate an in-house bylaw enforcement division, municipalities may rely on police services, contracted commissionaires, or private firms for bylaw enforcement.

==== Duties ====
In most Canadian municipalities, bylaw enforcement officers are tasked with the enforcement of the regulations or by-laws of the municipality, and usually operate on an as-requested basis with little-to-no proactive enforcement.

In all three territories, however, as well as the provinces of Newfoundland and Labrador, Quebec, Saskatchewan, and Alberta, some — but not all — municipal enforcement agencies also enforce provincial legislation and control traffic. In Alberta and Saskatchewan, bylaw enforcement officers can be additionally trained and appointed as community peace officers (in Alberta) or community safety officers (in Saskatchewan). These community officers maintain a proactive presence; have additional authority to enforce provincial legislation and conduct traffic enforcement; respond alongside other emergency services to 9-1-1 calls; and, in Saskatchewan, field complaints for minor criminal offences.

==== Peace officer status ====
All bylaw enforcement officers employed in Canada are peace officers; in most provinces, bylaw officers are explicitly appointed as peace officers or special constables for the purpose of enforcing municipal laws, while in others, such as British Columbia, enforcement officers get their authority from court decisions that have ruled that bylaw officers are included as peace officers in the Criminal Code as "other person[s] employed for the preservation or maintenance of the public peace or for the service or execution of civil process."

=== Malta ===
In 2015, the Local Enforcement Systems Agency (LESA) was established by law. LESA officers use operational vehicles equipped with emergency lighting and siren systems, and they wear police-style uniforms. Their remit includes the enforcement of traffic and environmental laws. LESA officers handle and report traffic accidents, provide traffic management services, and enforce the aforementioned legal provisions. Given the size of Malta, it functions as a national-level agency for the enforcement of local regulations.

=== New Zealand ===
In New Zealand, local governments such as district/city councils usually appoint persons to undertake certain enforcement duties. Councils can employ persons such as: Enforcement Officers, Animal Control Officers, Parking Officers, Noise Control Officers, and Litter Officers. These positions are granted role-specific powers under legislation. Common parts of their roles include enforcing bylaws made by the local council, such as dog-leash rules or parking restrictions during special events. Abuse against these government employees is commonplace and safety measures have started to take effect, such as body-worn cameras.

=== United Kingdom ===
In the United Kingdom, the word warden is commonly used to describe various classes of non-police enforcement officers, and sometimes the title of inspector is also used in various jurisdictions. An environmental warden in Edinburgh has duties very similar to those of a bylaw enforcement officer employed by a similar-sized city in Canada.

== Europe ==
=== Austria ===
In Austria, municipal code enforcement agencies exist under different denominations and scope of duties in only a few cities. As a municipal authority, the scope of duties is often distributed across several different departments, depending on the municipality. For enforcement purposes, many cities prefer to establish and maintain municipal police forces (German: Stadtpolizei), which are also tasked with enforcing local municipal ordinances. These municipal police forces are armed and hold a status equivalent to that of the federal police within their respective municipal territories.

Depending on the respective city, the duties are:

- foot/bicycle patrols
- traffic enforcement
- noise-related violations
- parking enforcement
- operations in public parks and at events

In by far the largest city in Austria, in Vienna, a large number of code enforcement agencies are established:

- parking enforcement: Parkraumüberwachungsgruppe (PÜG)
- marketplace authority: Marktamt
- Hunde-Team: the Vienna "dog team" is tasked with enforcing requirements such as the use of leashes and muzzles, verifying authorization to handle "listed", restricted-breed, dogs, and ensuring compliance with other relevant regulations. The staff members are authorized to issue fines.
- Ordnungsberater ("order consultants"): The order consultants’ duty is within Vienna’s municipal housing estates: they monitor compliance with the "Vienna cleanliness bill" and take action against issues such as noise disturbances, improper parking, etc.
- WasteWatcher: the tasks include monitoring compliance with the "Vienna cleanliness act" with a focus on bulky waste, dog excrement, cigarette butts, illegally abandoned shopping carts, and the discarding of food scraps.

=== France ===
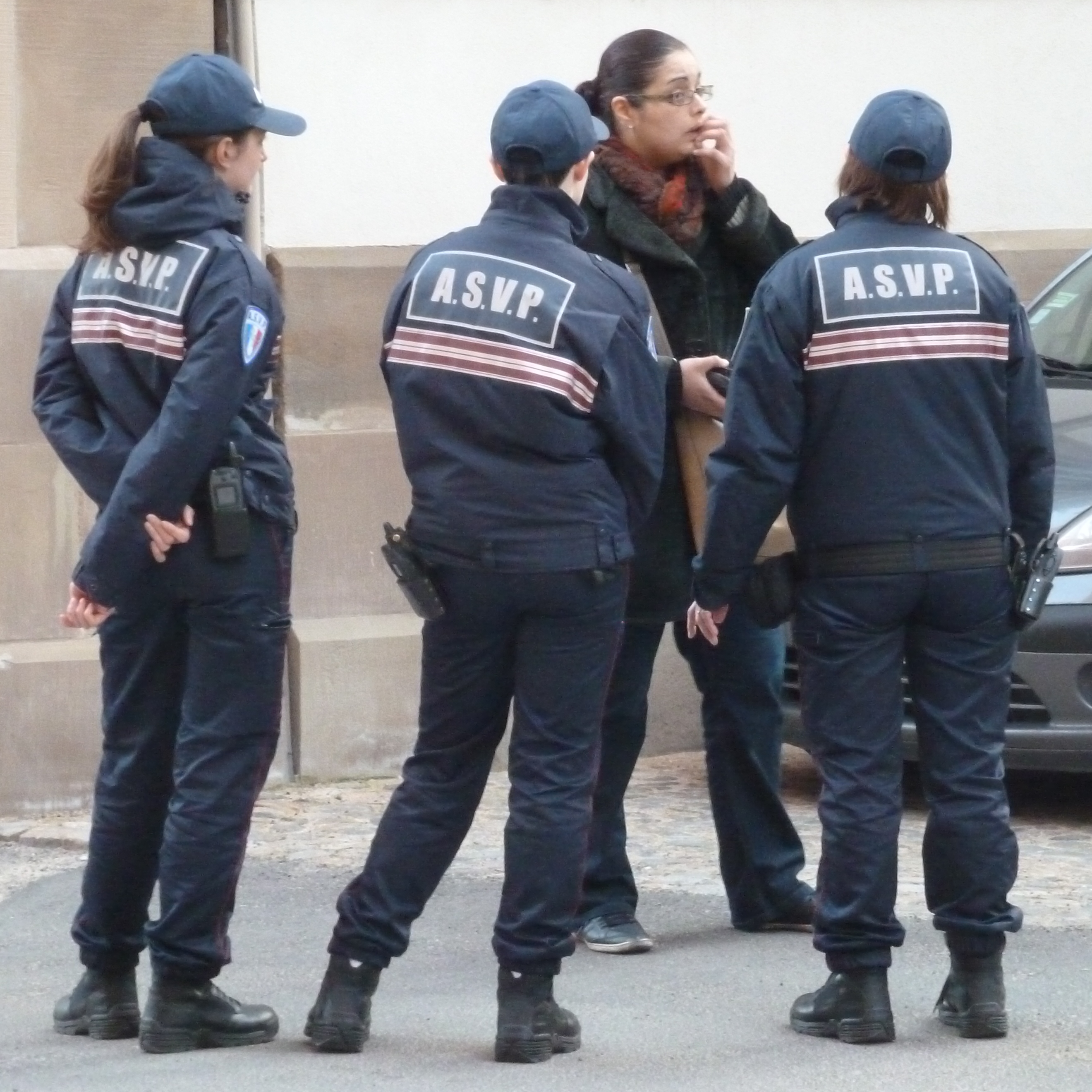
ASVP in Strasbourg (2014)

In France the duties of municipal enforcement service are generally carried out in most municipalities by the municipal police, the Police Municipale. In addition, the ASVP, the Agents de surveillance de la voie publique, surveillance agents, whose scope of duties is limited nationwide to three specific areas:

- identifying instances of illegal stopping or parking of vehicles (excluding, however, stopping that causes an obstruction, creates a danger, or constitutes an abuse—matters that only police officers are authorized to determine);
- identifying the absence of proof of insurance for motor vehicles;
- penalizing violations of regulations concerning cleanliness in public spaces.

Unlike the nationwide uniform regulations for municipal police units, the details of the uniforms worn by ASVP personnel are not formally regulated. Decisions regarding the uniforms are left to the discretion of local municipal authorities. The only requirements are that the individual's function must be clearly indicated on the uniform.

In Paris, alongside the police municipale (established in 2021), there are two additional public order corps named different to the rest of the country, tasked with the ASVP duties:

- ISVP: Inspecteurs de sécurité de la ville de Paris
- ASP: Agents de surveillance de Paris

=== Germany ===
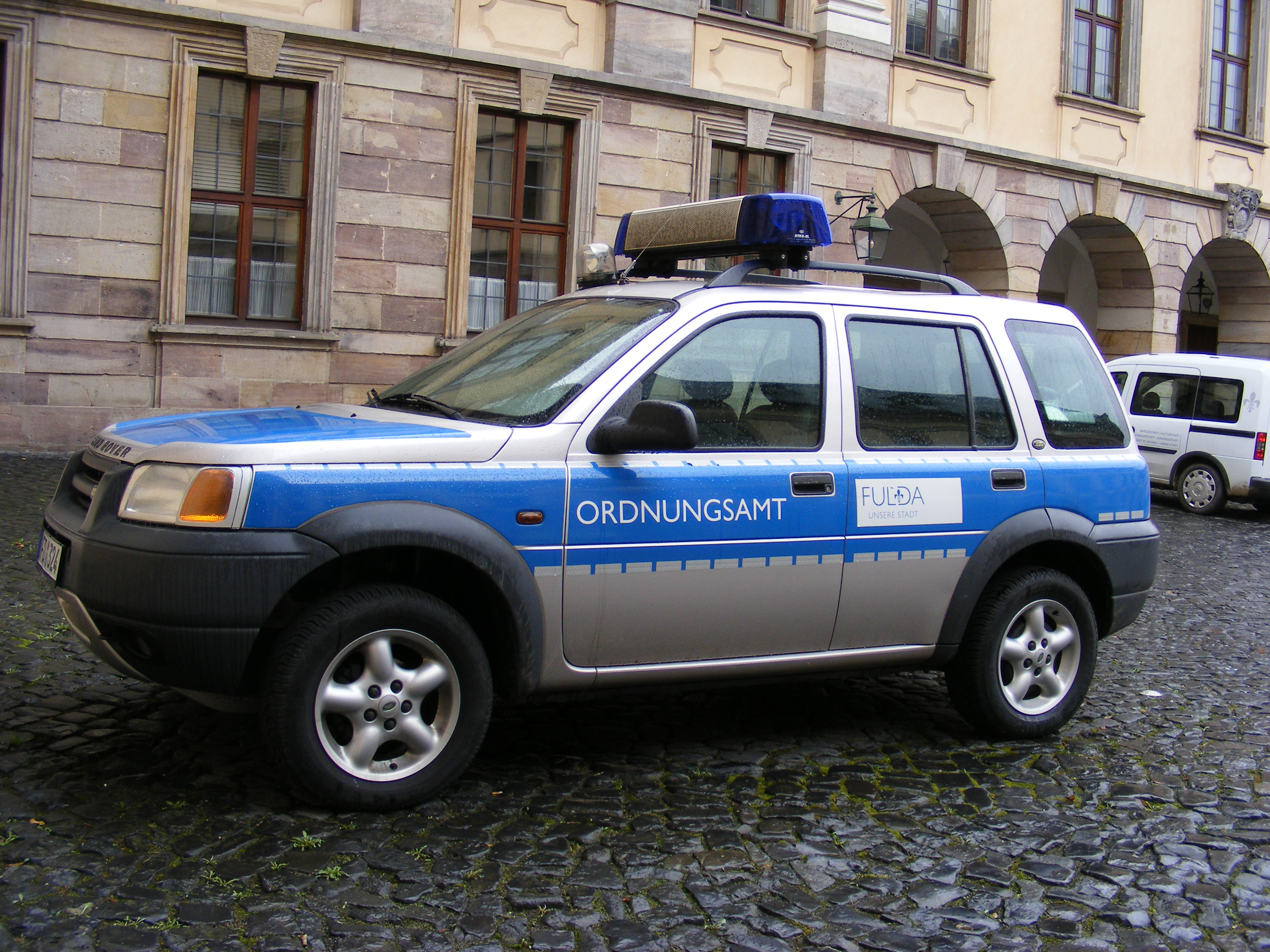
Patrol car of Ordnungsamt Fulda, Germany

In Germany, order enforcement offices are established under each state's laws and local regulations, using different terms like Ordnungsamt (order enforcement office), Ordnungsdienst (order enforcement service), Gemeindevollzugsdienst (municipal code enforcement office) or Polizeibehörde (police authority). Beside this some German communities have implemented Stadtpolizei (city police) forces for general law enforcement. Currently there are no general regulations or standards for their training: their responsibilities and powers vary. The equipment and uniforms differ from town to town; some carry weapons and wear police-like or police uniforms, others just wear labeled jackets over plain clothes. Most of the order enforcement offices are established by the municipalities, but they can also be established by the rural districts for their area of competence.

=== The Netherlands ===
In the Netherlands, this service is called Handhaving (Dutch for "Enforcement") or Handhaving en Toezicht (Dutch for "Enforcement and Surveillance"), and the police-like uniforms carry this inscription in most cities as well. The officials of these municipal authorities actively address people who are against the city regulations and are present in public places. The responsibilities of Handhaving include:

- drug harassment or alcohol abuse
- review of prostitution permits, detection of abuses such as human trafficking
- increasing objective and subjective security in public spaces and public transport
- the towing of dangerously parked vehicles

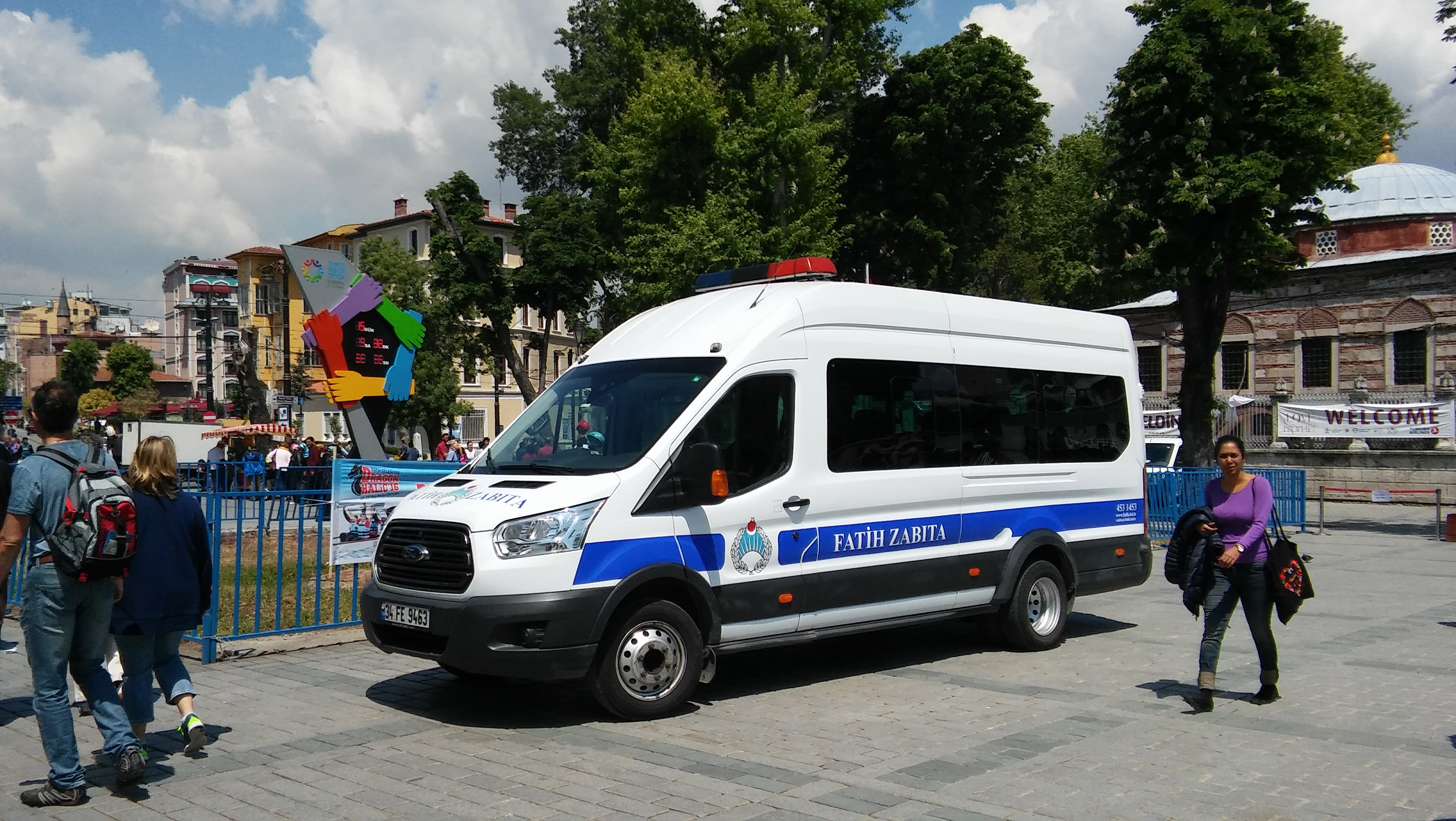
Zabıta car in Fatih

=== Turkey ===
In Turkey, Zabıta or Belediye Zabıtası (municipal public order officers or municipal public order authority) have been established at the municipal government level. The Zabıta is responsible for carrying out and overseeing certain public services within municipal boundaries. Under recent legislation, these officers also exercise authority as traffic enforcement officers within metropolitan municipalities.

== China ==
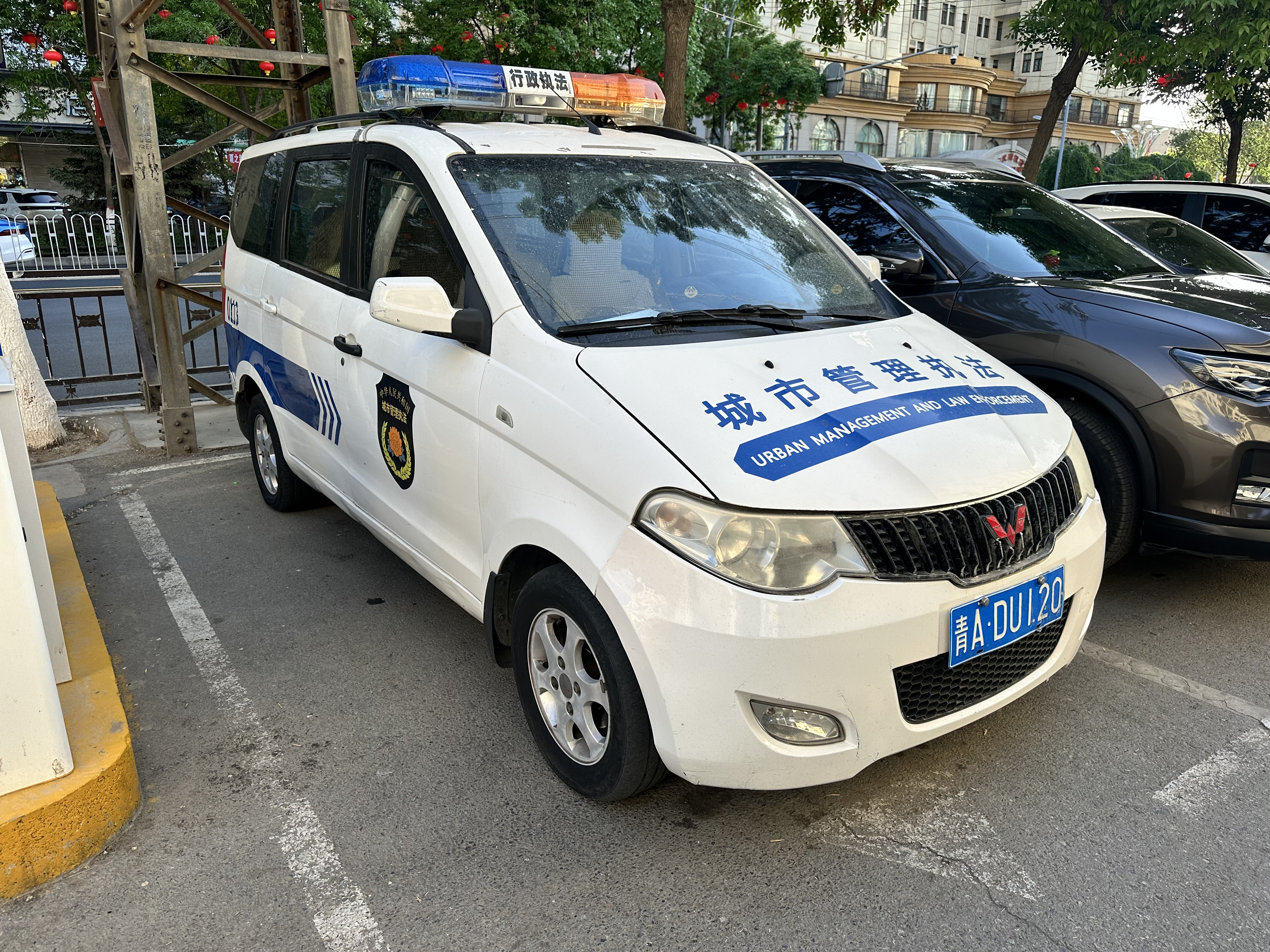
Car of Urban Management and Law Enforcement in Xining

In the mainland of the People's Republic of China (PRC) every city established a so-called Urban Administrative and Law Enforcement Bureau, commonly abbreviated to Chengguan (Chinese: 城管; pinyin: Chéngguǎn) as a local government agency for bylaw enforcement duties.

The Chengguan is part of a city or municipality's Urban Management Bureau (Chinese: 城市管理局; pinyin: Chéngshì Guǎnlǐ Jú). The agency enforces local bylaws, city appearance bylaws, environment, sanitation, work safety, pollution control, health, and can involve enforcement in planning, greening, industry and commerce, environment protection, municipal affairs and water in large cities.

== Philippines ==
Metro Manila has traffic enforcers, employed by the Metro Manila Development Authority to enforce traffic by-laws along with the Philippine National Police, as well as laws pertaining to cleanliness in the streets. They do not carry the powers of arrest which is reserved to the police and only issue citation tickets for violators.

== United States ==
In the United States, those employed in various capacities of code enforcement may be called Code Enforcement Officers, Municipal Regulations Officers, or with various titles depending on their specialization.

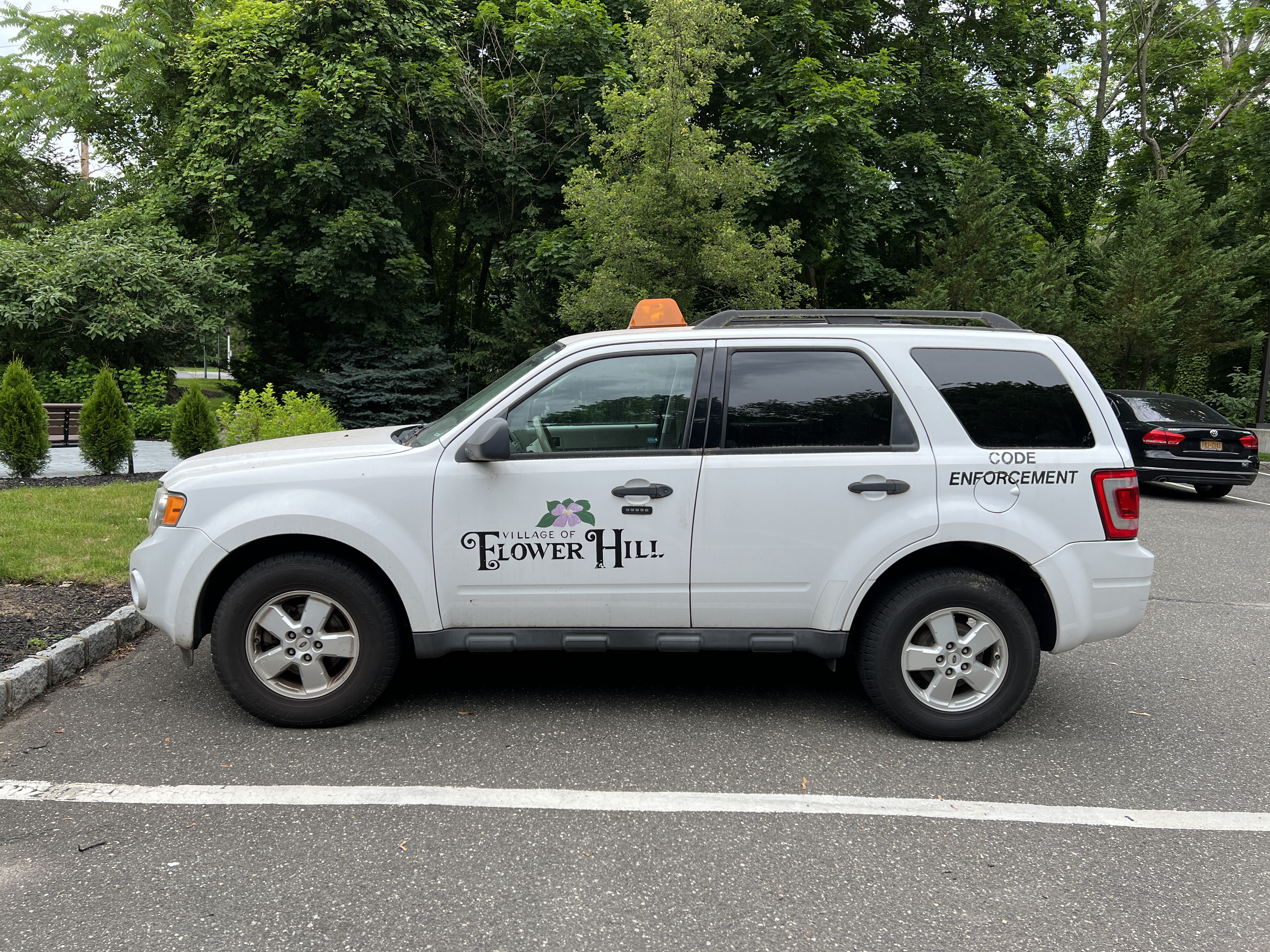
A municipal code enforcement vehicle in Flower Hill, New York, United States

Municipalities in the United States more frequently use the terms code enforcement officer or municipal regulations officer or Abatement Officers. Code Enforcement’s scope and duties in the United States vary drastically from municipality to municipality. Code Enforcement Officers often handle enforcement of Short-Term Rental laws, building occupancy, accumulation of solid waste, abandoned vehicles on private property & public right-of-way, overgrown vegetation, inoperable vehicle storage, squatter homes, homeless encampments, unsecured dangerous structures, businesses operating without a license or in residential zones, graffiti abatement, and other zoning related ordinances.

== See also ==
- Codification
- Code of Federal Regulations
- Dress code
- National Electrical Code
- International Building Code
- Legal code
- Fire code
- Penal code
- Traffic code
- Nuisance abatement
- Trading Standards

== See also ==
- Nuisance abatement
- Traffic warden
- Traffic guard
- Traffic police
- Highway patrol
- State police
- Car guard
- Municipal police
