= Council ranger =

Civil law officers of Australia

Council rangers are officers employed by local government areas in Australia to enforce the by-laws of those local governments and a limited range of state laws relating to such matters as litter control, animal control, dog laws, cat laws, bush fire control, off-road vehicles, emergency management, and parking. A Council Ranger is also referred to as Local Laws Officers in some of Australia's eastern states.

General law enforcement duties are performed by individual State/Territory Police and the Australian Federal Police.

A Council Ranger/Local Laws Officer in Australia is the equivalent to a Bylaw Enforcement Officer in Canada.

== Duties ==
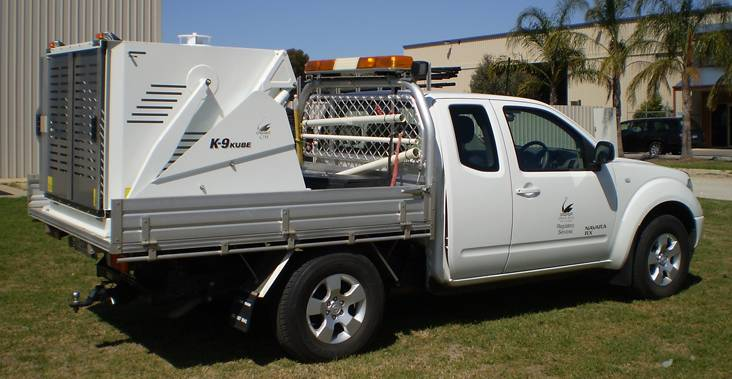
Typical Council Ranger vehicle fitted with a K9 cube for stray dog collection

Rangers are responsible for enforcing off-road vehicle laws by patrolling bush lands, beaches and reserves to protect sensitive areas from unauthorised off-road vehicles use.

A Ranger is only authorised in the Local Government Authority (LGA) District he or she is employed. However, it is not uncommon for a Ranger be authorised in another district as well.

The Authorised Person/Officer can enter another district to investigate an offence under various Acts if the offence had originally occurred in the judicial district. In relation to Control of Vehicles (Off Road) Act offences a Ranger can pursue an offender into another district.

Rangers are classed as a “Public Officer” under the Criminal Investigation Act (2004), which gives the same legal standing as a police officer, for the Act that the Ranger is authorised under.

Often a Ranger will be authorised under the Animal Welfare Act (2002) as a Restricted General Inspector to deal with animal welfare issues not covered by the Dog, Cat and Livestock Acts. This is the same legislation that gives authorisation to the RSPCA WA Inspectorate. The authorisation is only valid in the district the ranger is employed in.

Unless they are also sworn as special constables, rangers do not have full police powers. Special Constable status is only applicable in New South Wales under the Police Act 1901. In most states it is legislated under various Acts as “Authorised Person” or “Authorised Officer” without the requirement to take an oath of office.

In Western Australia, a Ranger is appointed by the LGA CEO and the appointment is advertised in the State Government Gazette. Training in Western Australia is at TAFE level. The minimum requirement is the study courses of “Municipal Law Enforcement Units A and B”. This can progress into the qualification of Certificate IV in Local Government (Regulatory Services)

== Alternative titles ==
Some local government councils have various alternative titles for rangers being “Customer Advocates” (City of Swan) “Community Safety Rangers” (City of Stirling) “Community Ranger” (City of South Perth. Town of Bassendean) “Security Officer Ranger” (City of Bayswater) "City Assist" (City of Kwinana) and “Shire Ranger” (Shire of East Pilbara and various regional towns and shires)
