= Babylon Berlin =

German neo-noir television series

- Genre: Neo-noir; Thriller; Period drama
- Created by: Tom Tykwer; Achim von Borries; Henk Handloegten
- Based on: Gereon Rath series by Volker Kutscher
- Written by: Henk Handloegten; Achim von Borries; Tom Tykwer
- Directed by: Henk Handloegten; Achim von Borries; Tom Tykwer
- Starring: Volker Bruch; Liv Lisa Fries; Peter Kurth; Matthias Brandt; Leonie Benesch; Severija Janušauskaitė; Ivan Shvedoff; Lars Eidinger; Anton von Lucke; Mišel Matičević; Henning Peker; Fritzi Haberlandt; Karl Markovics; Jens Harzer; Ernst Stötzner; Jördis Triebel; Christian Friedel; Denis Burgaslijew; Thomas Thieme; Hannah Herzsprung; Ivo Pietzcker; Benno Fürmann; Ronald Zehrfeld; Meret Becker; Udo Samel; Luc Feit; Trystan Pütter; Thorsten Merten; Rüdiger Klink; Godehard Giese; Saskia Rosendahl; Sabin Tambrea; Julius Feldmeier; Jacob Matschenz; Irene Böhm; Hans-Marrin Stier; Hanno Koffler; Martin Wuttke; Sebastian Urzendowsky; Mark Ivanir; Moisej Bazijan; Marie-Anne Fliegel; Holger Handtke; Peter Jordan
- Theme music composer: Tom Tykwer; Johnny Klimek
- Country of origin: Germany
- Original languages: German; Russian; Yiddish; English
- No. of seasons: 5
- No. of episodes: 48

Production
- Producers: Stefan Arndt; Uwe Schott; Michael Polle
- Running time: 45 minutes
- Production companies: ARD Degeto; Sky Deutschland (Season 1–4); X Filme Creative Pool; Beta Film

Original release
- Network: Sky 1
- Release: 13 October 2017 – 12 November 2022
- Network: ARD Mediathek
- Release: 30 September 2018 – 10 September 2026
- Network: Das Erste
- Release: 30 September 2018 – 25 September 2026

Babylon Berlin is a German neo-noir television series. Created, written, and directed by Tom Tykwer, Achim von Borries, and Hendrik Handloegten, it is loosely based on the Gereon Rath series of novels by Volker Kutscher.

The series premiered on 13 October 2017 on Sky 1. The first release consisted of a continuous run of 16 episodes, with the first eight officially known as Season 1, and the second eight known as Season 2. Season 3 premiered in January 2020, followed by Season 4 in October 2022. The fifth and final season premiered in Germany on 10 September 2026.

Historically the most expensive non-English language television drama series ever produced, it was a critical success, winning the Bambi Award for Best Television Show, four German Television Award (including one for Best Series), the Rose d'Or, and Achievement in Fiction Series Award at the European Film Awards. Netflix exclusively streamed seasons 1 to 3 in Australia, Canada, New Zealand, and the United States until they were removed in February 2024. The first four seasons dropped on the Australian free-to-air streaming service SBS on Demand in March 2024. In April 2024, the first three seasons of the show began streaming on MHz Choice in the United States and Canada, with the fourth season added in June.

== Synopsis ==
The series is set in Berlin during the latter years of the Weimar Republic, beginning in 1929. It follows Gereon Rath, a police inspector on assignment from Cologne, who is on a secret mission to dismantle an extortion ring, and police clerk Charlotte Ritter, who aspires to become a police inspector.

Season 1 and 2 depict a conservative conspiracy against the Republic; season 3 depicts the slow rise of the Nazi Party in 1929 before the Great Depression; season 4 depicts internal conflicts within the Nazi Party in 1931; and season 5 centres on their rise to power in 1933.

== Cast ==
=== Main ===
- Volker Bruch as Inspector Gereon Rath, a combat veteran of the Imperial German Army during World War I and a policeman newly transferred from his home town of Cologne to Berlin; he struggles with morphine dependence linked to his war experiences, particularly his survivor's guilt over the loss of his brother (seasons 1–5)
- Liv Lisa Fries as Charlotte Ritter ("Lotte"), a flapper from the slums of Neukölln and an occasional sex worker at the Moka Efti cabaret, who works as a police clerk and dreams of becoming the first female homicide detective in the history of the Berlin Police (seasons 1–5)
- Peter Kurth as Detective Chief Inspector (DCI) Bruno Wolter, a Berlin Police investigator whose affability masks unseemly tendencies; he becomes the primary antagonist in season 2 (seasons 1–2)
- Matthias Brandt as Councillor August Benda, the Jewish chief of the "Political Police" department of the Berlin Police. A tenacious investigator and true believer in the Weimar Republic, Benda is equally loathed by monarchists, communists, and Nazis; for years, he has been investigating the Black Reichswehr (seasons 1–2)
- Leonie Benesch as Greta Overbeck, a down-on-her-luck childhood friend of Charlotte Ritter who eventually finds a job as domestic servant to Councillor Benda and his family and reluctantly gets entwined in an assassination scheme (seasons 1–3)
- Severija Janušauskaitė as Countess Svetlana Sorokina ("Sveta")/Nikoros, a White Russian émigré, cross-dressing singer at the Moka Efti cabaret, and spy for the Soviet secret police (seasons 1–2)
- Ivan Shvedoff as Alexei Kardakov, an anti-Stalinist Russian refugee and the leader of a fictional Trotskyist cell in Berlin called the "Red Fortress" (season 1; guest season 2)
- Lars Eidinger as Alfred Nyssen, a steel manufacturer with links to Reichswehr and Freikorps officers plotting to overthrow the Republic and restore Kaiser Wilhelm II to the German throne and who detests the ruling Social Democratic Party of Germany (seasons 1–5)
- Anton von Lucke as Stephan Jänicke, a young detective in the Berlin Police who has been assigned by Councillor Benda to investigate Wolter for ties to the Black Reichswehr (season 1; recurring season 2)
- Mišel Matičević as Edgar Kasabian, "the Armenian", the impeccably dressed owner of the Moka Efti cabaret and the leader of organized crime in Berlin; a ruthless but deeply principled gangster, he acts as a secret protector to Inspector Gereon Rath for personal reasons (season 1–3, 5; recurring season 4)
- Henning Peker as Franz Krajewski, a drug addict who works as a police informant (season 1; guest season 3; recurring season 5)
- Fritzi Haberlandt as Elisabeth Behnke, a kind friend of Bruno Wolter who maintains a boarding house where Inspector Rath stays (seasons 1–5)
- Karl Markovics as Samuel Katelbach, an eccentric writer and sometime journalist who befriends Rath at the boarding house (seasons 1–5)
- Jens Harzer as Dr. Anno Schmidt, a mysterious doctor whose atypical practices are considered fringe by the Berlin medical community but heralded by others, including the Armenian (seasons 1–5)
- Ernst Stötzner as Major General Wilhelm Seegers, (Note: The character of Seegers is based on the biography of Kurt von Hammerstein-Equord, see Ralf Hoffrogge (3 December 2020). "Espionage and Intrigue in Babylon Berlin: The General's Daughter". historicalmaterialism.org.; Ralf Hoffrogge: A Jewish Communist in Weimar Germany The Life of Werner Scholem (1895-1940) Brill Publishers, Leiden 2017, pp. 494-528) a member of the Reichswehr's General Staff and DCI Bruno Wolter's commanding officer during the Great War; he opposes the Republic and is up to many secret activities (seasons 1–2; guest seasons 3–4)
- Jördis Triebel as Dr. Völcker, a communist doctor who disagrees with the practices of the Berlin police department (seasons 1–5)
- Christian Friedel as Reinhold Gräf, a photographer for the Berlin police department who works closely with Rath (seasons 1–5)
- Denis Burgazliev as Col. Trokhin, a Soviet diplomat and official of Joseph Stalin's secret police who targets anti-Stalinists (seasons 1–2)
- Thomas Thieme as Karl Zörgiebel, the stern police chief of Berlin and former chief of Cologne (seasons 1–3)
- Hannah Herzsprung as Helga Rath, Inspector Gereon Rath's secret lover of more than ten years and the wife of his brother, who has been missing since the First World War (seasons 2–5; recurring season 1)
- Ivo Pietzcker as Moritz Rath, Gereon Rath's nephew and Helga's son whose curiosity gets him into trouble (seasons 2, 4; recurring season 3)
- Benno Fürmann as Colonel Gottfried Wendt, an ambitious and untrustworthy political police counselor who is a power player with the NSDAP (seasons 2–5; guest season 1)
- Ronald Zehrfeld as Walter Weintraub, the mysterious and ruthless partner of the Armenian who returns from time in prison (seasons 3–4)
- Meret Becker as Esther Kasabian, a former actress married to the Armenian who dreams of returning to acting as well as reconciling the men she loves (seasons 3–4)
- Udo Samel as Ernst "Buddha" Gennat, the stern but kind head of Berlin's Homicide Department, based on a real director of the Berlin criminal police (seasons 3–5; recurring season 2)
- Luc Feit as Leopold Ullrich, detail-oriented police analyst (season 3; recurring season 2)
- Trystan Pütter as Hans Litten, a pro bono attorney interested in Greta's case, based on a real lawyer (seasons 3–5)
- Thorsten Merten as Alfons Henning, a homicide investigator working under Rath with Czerwinski (seasons 3–5; recurring seasons 1–2)
- Rüdiger Klink as Paul Czerwinski, a homicide investigator working under Rath with Henning (seasons 3–5; recurring seasons 1–2)
- Godehard Giese as Wilhelm Böhm, a high-ranking homicide detective who often clashes with Rath and Ritter (seasons 3–5; recurring seasons 1–2)
- Saskia Rosendahl as Marie-Luise Seegers, (Note: The character of Marie-Luise is based on the biography of Marie Luise von Hammerstein, see Ralf Hoffrogge (3 December 2020). "Espionage and Intrigue in Babylon Berlin: The General's Daughter". historicalmaterialism.org.; Ralf Hoffrogge: A Jewish Communist in Weimar Germany The Life of Werner Scholem (1895-1940) Brill Publishers, Leiden 2017, pp. 494-528) a communist law student who disagrees with her father, General Seegers (seasons 3–4)
- Sabin Tambrea as Tristan Rot, aka Herbert Plumpe, widower of Betty Winter, a melodramatic actor with an interest in the occult (season 3)
- Julius Feldmeier as Otto Wollenberg/Horst Kessler, (Note: The character of Kessler is based on Horst Wessel. His name is slightly changed, but his biography and manner of death are entirely unchanged, as are the names of his girlfriend Erna and his murderer, Ali) a friend of Fritz with villainous intentions (season 3; recurring seasons 1–2)
- Jacob Matschenz as Fritz Höckert/Richard Pechtmann, a friend of Otto with villainous intentions (season 3; recurring seasons 1–2)
- Irene Böhm as Antonie Ritter ("Toni"), Charlotte's younger sister (season 4; recurring seasons 1–3)
- Hans-Martin Stier as Albert Grzesinski, Zörgiebel's successor (season 4; guest season 3)
- Hanno Koffler as Walter Stennes, a young Nazi lieutenant who collaborates covertly with Wendt (season 4; recurring season 3)
- Martin Wuttke as Gustav Heymann, editor-in-chief of the newspaper Tempo (season 4–5; recurring season 3)
- Sebastian Urzendowsky as Max Fuchs ("Reinstecke"), Kasabian's right-hand man (season 4; recurring seasons 1–3)
- Mark Ivanir as Abraham Goldstein, a Jewish American gangster (season 4)
- Moisej Bazijan as Jakob Grün, a jeweler and a relative of Goldstein (season 4)
- Marie-Anne Fliegel as Annemarie Nyssen, Alfred's mother (season 4; recurring seasons 1–3, 5)
- Holger Handtke as Georg Wegener, the Nyssen family lawyer and Alfred's confidant (season 4–5; recurring seasons 1–3)
- Peter Jordan as Fred Jacoby, a journalist and Gräf's romantic partner (season 4–5; recurring season 3)
- Jenny Schily as Rosa Helfers, the warden of Barnimstrasse women's prison and later a prominent socialist (season 5; recurring seasons 3–4)
- Clemens Schick as Adolf Hitler, chancellor of Germany and Führer of the Nazi Party (season 5)
- Devid Striesow as Hermann Göring, President of the Reichstag and a key ally of Hitler (season 5)
- Ulrich Noethen as Dr. Edmund Forster, a psychiatrist who once treated Hitler for hysterical blindness in late 1918 (season 5)
- Uwe Preuss as Otto Wels, chairman of the Social Democratic Party of Germany (SPD) (season 5)
- Daniel Borgwardt as Ernst Thälmann, chairman of the Communist Party of Germany (KPD) (season 5)

=== Recurring ===
- Laura Kiehne as Ilse Ritter, Charlotte's older sister (seasons 1–3)
- Pit Bukowski as Erich Ritter, Ilse's husband (seasons 1–2; guest season 3)
- Anton Rattinger as Dr. Joseph Schwarz, a forensic pathologist at the University of Berlin (seasons 1–4)
- Lilli Fichtner as Doris Przybyszewski, an archivist and a friend of Charlotte (seasons 1–4)
- Johann Jürgens as Rudolf Malzig ("Rudi"), a medical student and friend of Charlotte and Stephan (seasons 1,4; guest seasons 2–3)
- Hanns Zischler as Engelbert Rath, Gereon's and Anno's father and the police chief in Cologne (seasons 1 and 5)
- Joachim Paul Assböck as Major Anton von Beck, General Seeger's adjutant (seasons 1–2)
- Waldemar Kobus as Joseph Döhmann, a pharmacist who regularly supplies Gereon with morphine in exchange for pornography (season 1)
- Florian Panzner as Willy Scheer, former Lieutenant Colonel and a member of the Black Reichswehr (seasons 1-2)
- Marie Gruber as Emmi Wolter, Bruno's wife (seasons 1–2)
- Jeanette Hain as Irmgard Benda, August's wife (season 1–3)
- Emil von Schönfels as Arndt Scheer, a young member of the SA and a friend of Moritz who has sexual relations with Wendt (seasons 3–4; guest season 1)
- Caro Cult as Vera Lohmann, an actress who replaces Betty Winter in the film Demons of Passion after her murder (season 3)
- Werner Wölbern as Gustav Stresemann, Germany's Minister of Foreign Affairs (season 3)
- Rolf Kanies as Aristide Briand, French Minister of Foreign Affairs (season 2)
- Günter Lamprecht as Paul von Hindenburg, retired field marshal and President of Germany (season 2)
- Detlef Bierstedt as Gustav Böß, the Lord Mayor of Berlin (season 1)
- Burkhart Siedhoff as Franz von Papen, an aristocrat and later chancellor of Germany (season 3)
- David C. Bunners as Heinrich Brüning, a Centre Party politician and later chancellor of Germany (seasons 3-4)
- Max Hauff as Matthias Haaße ("Jacky"), proprietor of the café "Koppeneck" and a friend of Charlotte (seasons 3-5)
- Bernhard Schütz as Jo Bellmann, a film director (season 3)
- Lola Witzmann as Renate Cziczewicz, a young girl and vagrant who befriends Toni (seasons 3–4)
- Ades Zabel as Hugo Wannmacher ("Red Hugo"), a mob boss who owns the Immertreu boxing ring (season 4)
- Lenn Kudrjawizki as Oskar Kulanin, a Soviet double agent and Marie-Luise's love interest (season 4)
- Sascha Nathan as Hermann Blank, editor-in-chief of the Nazi newspaper Der Angriff (season 4–5)
- Joachim Meyerhoff as Dr. Ferdinand Voss, a corrupt judge and leader of the White Hand (season 4)
- Nicolas Wolf as Oberführer Wolf-Heinrich von Helldorff, Stennes' rival in the SA (season 4)
- Maximilian Jaenisch as Sturmführer Erich Döbrich, a ruthless member of the SA (seasons 4-5)
- Wiebke Puls as Helene Voss, Ferdinand's wife and the warden of Sonnenborn detention facility (season 4)
- Barbara Philipp as Elisabeth Krüger ("Iron-Else"), the mob boss who controls the boxing rings in the northern part of Berlin (season 4)
- Karlheinz Schmitt as Eduard Brüning ("Knife-Ede"), a mob boss known for using knives as his signature weapons (season 4)
- Herold Vomeer as Adolf Leib ("Muscle-Adolf"), a mob boss closely aligned with Weintraub (season 4)
- Tobi B. as Jacob Reinhardt ("Blinde-Bob"), a mob boss from the northern part of Berlin (season 4)
- Roberto Thoenelt as Robert Fitzek ("Rat-Robert"), a mob boss who is known for disposing his victims with rats (season 4)
- Hannes Wegener as Johann "Rukeli" Trollmann, a German Sinti boxer and suspected half-brother of Charlotte (season 4)
- Le Pustra as Edwina Morell, the flamed-haired host of Kabarett der Namenlosen and owner of the Luxor Nightclub (season 5; guest seasons 3–4)
- Martin Armknecht as Dr. Konrad Adenauer, the Lord Mayor of Cologne and a long-time friend of Gereon's family (season 5)
- Tobias Kersloot as Marinus van der Lubbe, a Dutch communist (season 5)
- Alexander Radszun as Magnus von Levetzow, the police chief in Berlin after Hitler's rise to power (season 5)
- André Szymanski as Ernst Weiss, an Austrian author of Jewish descent living in Paris (season 5)
- Nils Hohenhövel as Sturmführer Paul Strelow, a member of the SA and a former patient of Dr. Forster (season 5)
- Rainer Sellien as General Kurt von Schleicher, former chancellor of Germany (season 5)
- Michel Diercks as Harry Przybylski, a producer at the German Broadcasting House (season 5)
- Lukas Turtur as Dr. Martin Dresse, a former State Prosecutor from Munich who has gone into hiding (season 5)
- Jakob Scmidt as Michael Potocznik ("Micky"), Heymann's assistant at Tempo (season 5)
- Daniel Drewes as Eduard von Kittlitz, German ambassador to France (season 5)

=== Overview ===
Actor	Character	Seasons				
Actor	Character	1	2	3	4	5
Main characters
Volker Bruch	Gereon Rath	Main	Main	Main	Main	Main
Liv Lisa Fries	Charlotte Ritter	Main	Main	Main	Main	Main
Peter Kurth	Bruno Wolter	Main	Main			
Matthias Brandt	August Benda	Main	Main			
Leonie Benesch	Greta Overbeck	Main	Main	Main		
Severija Janušauskaitė	Svetlana Sorokina	Main	Main			
Ivan Shvedoff	Alexei Kardakov	Main	Guest			
Lars Eidinger	Alfred Nyssen	Main	Main	Main	Main	Main
Anton von Lucke	Stephan Jänicke	Main	Recurring			
Mišel Matičević	Edgar Kasabian	Main	Main	Main	Recurring	Main
Henning Peker	Franz Krajewski	Main		Guest		Recurring
Fritzi Haberlandt	Elisabeth Behnke	Main	Main	Main	Main	Main
Karl Markovics	Samuel Katelbach	Main	Main	Main	Main	Main
Jens Harzer	Anno Schmidt	Main	Main	Main	Main	Main
Ernst Stötzner	Wilhelm Seegers	Main	Main	Recurring	Guest	
Jördis Triebel	Völcker	Main	Main	Main	Main	Main
Christian Friedel	Reinhold Gräf	Main	Main	Main	Main	Main
Denis Burgazliev	Trokhin	Main	Main			
Thomas Thieme	Karl Zörgiebel	Main	Main	Main		
Hannah Herzsprung	Helga Rath	Recurring	Main	Main	Main	Main
Ivo Pietzcker	Moritz Rath		Main	Recurring (Note: Pietzcker appears in more episodes of season 3 than seasons 2 or 4, however is credited as a guest star.)	Main	
Benno Fürmann	Gottfried Wendt	Guest	Main	Main	Main	Main
Ronald Zehrfeld	Walter Weintraub			Main	Main	
Meret Becker	Esther Kasabian			Main	Main	
Udo Samel	Ernst Gennat		Recurring	Main	Main	Main
Luc Feit	Leopold Ullrich		Recurring	Main		
Trystan Pütter	Hans Litten			Main	Main	Main
Thorsten Merten	Alfons Henning	Recurring	Recurring	Main	Main	Main
Rüdiger Klink	Paul Czerwinski	Recurring	Recurring	Main	Main	Main
Godehard Giese	Wilhelm Böhm	Guest	Recurring	Main	Main	Main
Saskia Rosendahl	Marie-Luise Seegers			Main	Main	
Sabin Tambrea	Tristan Rot			Main		
Julius Feldmeier	Horst Kessler	Recurring	Recurring	Main		
Jacob Matschenz	Richard Pechtmann	Recurring	Recurring	Main		
Irene Böhm	Toni Ritter	Recurring	Recurring	Recurring	Main	
Hans-Martin Stier	Albert Grzesinski			Guest	Main	
Hanno Koffler	Walther Stennes			Recurring	Main	
Martin Wuttke	Gustav Heymann			Recurring	Main	Main
Sebastian Urzendowsky	Max Fuchs	Recurring	Recurring	Recurring	Main	
Mark Ivanir	Abraham Gold				Main	
Moisej Bazijan	Jakob Grün				Main	
Marie-Anne Fliegel	Annemarie Nyssen	Guest	Recurring	Recurring	Main	Recurring
Holger Handtke	Georg Wegener	Recurring	Guest	Recurring	Main	Main
Peter Jordan	Fred Jacoby			Recurring	Main	Main
Ulrich Noethen	Edmund Forster					Main
Jenny Schily	Rosa Helfers			Recurring	Recurring	Main
Tobias Kersloot	Marinus van der Lubbe					Main
Clemens Schick	Adolf Hitler					Main
Devid Striesow	Hermann Göring					Main
Max Mauff	Jacky			Recurring	Recurring	Main

== Production ==
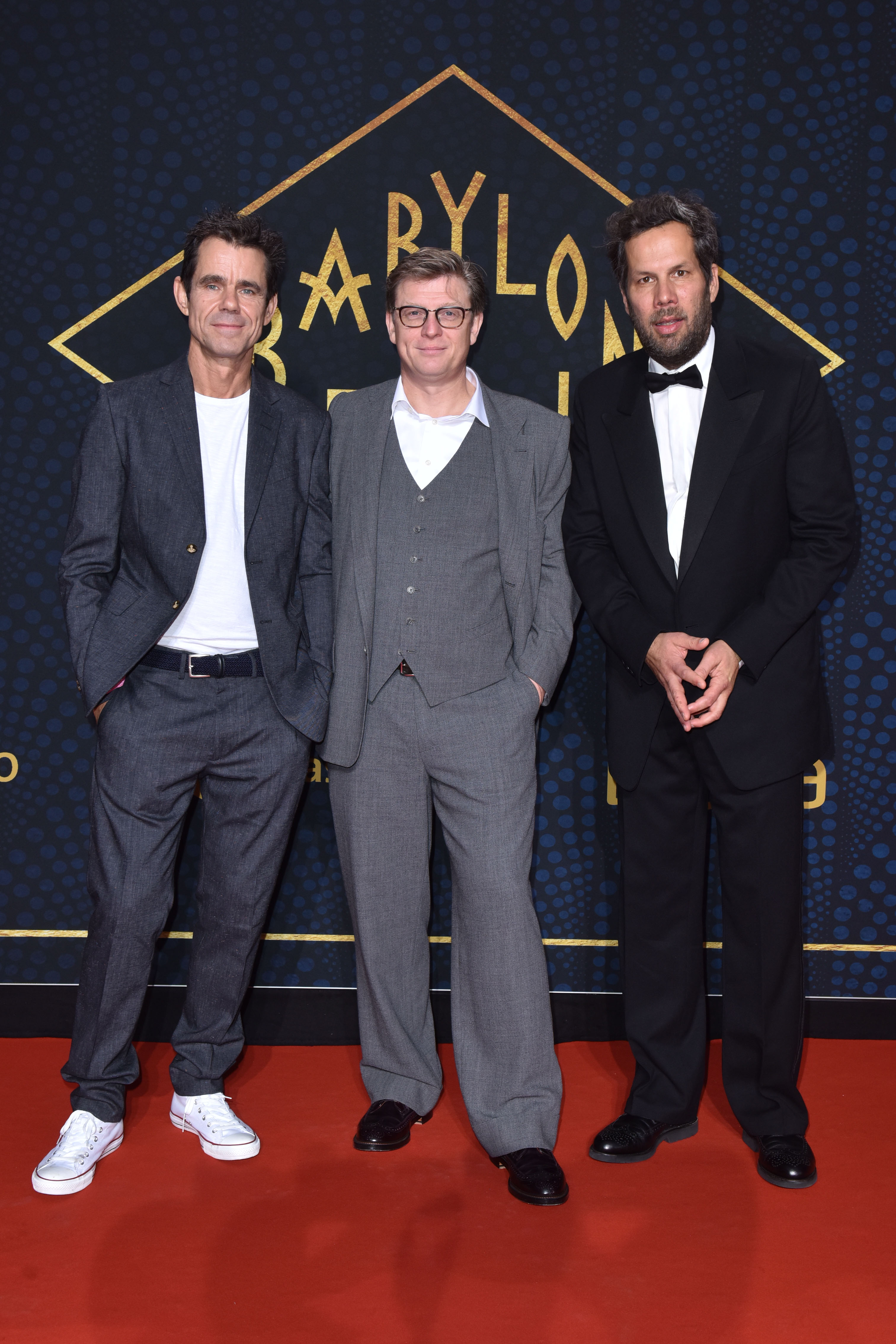
Tom Tykwer, Hendrik Handloegten and Achim von Borries at the premiere of Babylon Berlin at the Theater am Schiffbauerdamm, 28 September 2017

=== Development ===
==== Season 1 ====
The series was co-directed and co-written by Tom Tykwer, Hendrik Handloegten, and Achim von Borries. The 16 episodes of the first two seasons were adapted by Tykwer, von Borries and Handloegten from the novel Der nasse Fisch (The Wet Fish) (2008) by Volker Kutscher and were filmed over eight months beginning in May 2016.

German public broadcaster ARD and pay TV channel Sky co-produced the series, a first time collaboration in German television. As part of the arrangement, Sky broadcast the series first, and ARD started broadcasts by free-to-air television on 30 September 2018. Netflix purchased rights for the United States, Canada, and Australia, where the series became available in 2018 with English dubbing and subtitles.

With a budget of €40 million that increased to €55 million due to reshoots, the series is described as the most expensive television drama series in Germany,

==== Season 3 ====
The third season of Babylon Berlin was filmed over six months from late 2018 to May 2019. At the 32nd European Film Awards in December 2019, showrunners Achim von Borries, Henk Handloegten and Tom Tykwer stated that the third season was in post-production and that a fourth season was planned.

The third season was developed loosely around the second novel in Volker Kutscher's trilogy The Silent Death. The showrunners chose to diverge from the source material to better address the social and political unrest during the period as they felt that the Weimar Republic is often overlooked by both media and historical sources. The third season is set in late 1929 around the Black Tuesday stock market crash and navigates the rise of the subversive Black Reichswehr and communist political groups as well as the advent of talkies.

==== Season 4 ====
In a January 2020 interview with Berliner Zeitung, actress Liv Lisa Fries said that production would likely begin on the fourth season in late 2020 or early 2021. Planning and writing for the fourth season, based on the novel Goldstein, began in October 2020. Filming began in early 2021 and was completed in September 2021, with the production having shot for 129 days at Studio Babelsberg and at locations around Berlin. Season 4 is set in late 1930 and early 1931. It premiered on 8 October 2022.

The creators of Babylon Berlin stated in numerous interviews that they intended to end the series at the year 1933, with the assumption of power by Adolf Hitler and the Nazi Party. In 2020, Handloegten stated that:

"We decided to go on until 1933... if you call the show Babylon Berlin, it is about this special city in a very special time. And this special time, the Babylon times, the free and liberated times, just ended in 1933."

Along similar lines, Von Borries said in 2020:

We always said it was over in 1933. If there is a final season, it would be the first months after the so-called seizure of power before the Reichstag fire. The National Socialists had turned the country upside down so fundamentally that the Babylonian in Berlin was over. After that we don't want to go on.

==== Season 5 ====
After Sky Deutschland decided to stop ordering scripted originals in June 2023, the producers of the show ARD Degeto, X Filme Creative Pool and Beta Film committed to developing a fifth season.

The fifth and final season began filming on 11 November 2024 and completed filming in December 2025. It consists of eight episodes and is based on the fifth novel in the series, The March Fallen (Märzgefallene). The season follows Charlotte investigating a series of murders of soldiers, while Gereon goes missing. It begins on 30 January 1933, when Hitler became Chancellor of Germany, and continues through a five-week period of violence by the Nazis against their political opponents, culminating with the German federal election on 5 March 1933, when Hitler gained total control of the government. Handloegten, von Borries and Tykwer said in a press release:

In the final season of Babylon Berlin, we put February 1933 under the magnifying glass: Rarely has a society been torn apart more radically in such a short period of time than Germany in this chaotic month. Not only Gereon Rath and Charlotte Ritter, but all our protagonists also must realize that they only have a few options left: Subordinate themselves, risk their lives in open opposition, retreat into inner emigration or flee into exile. However, this decisive month also opens the possibility of changing the course of history at the last second.

Many of the series cast members return in season 5, with new faces including Clemens Schick, Ulrich Noethen, and Devid Striesow.

=== Era and historical accuracy ===
In an interview with The Wall Street Journal, one of the show's co-creators, Tom Tykwer, spoke about the era:

At the time people did not realize how absolutely unstable this new construction of society which the Weimar Republic represented was. It interested us because the fragility of democracy has been put to the test quite profoundly in recent years... By 1929, new opportunities were arising. Women had more possibilities to take part in society, especially in the labour market as Berlin became crowded with new thinking, new art, theatre, music and journalistic writing.

Nonetheless, Tykwer insisted that he and his co-directors were determined not to idealize the Weimar Republic: "People tend to forget that it was also a very rough era in German history. There was a lot of poverty, and people who had survived the war were suffering from a great deal of trauma."

In the first season, communists, Soviets and especially Trotskyists play a prominent role. The Soviet ambassador to Germany from 1923 to 1930 was former Trotsky ally Nikolay Krestinsky. The show depicts what became known as Blutmai, violence between communist demonstrators and members of the Berlin Police in early May 1929, and extra-legal paramilitary formations promoted by the German Army, known as the Black Reichswehr.

In the first season, the Soviet ambassador in Berlin, who appears to be a loyal Stalinist, is involved in the massacre of Trotskyists in the printing shop, who were buried in a mass grave outside the city. According to Nathaniel Flakin, this event never happened. Nazi Party leader Adolf Hitler is only mentioned in passing during the first two seasons of Babylon Berlin.

=== Music ===
The score for the series was composed by Tom Tykwer and Johnny Klimek, and was done before filming. Tykwer also asked permission to integrate a remixed version of two unused compositions by Reinhold Heil, as well as one that he had written with Tykwer. Hans Hafner was music editor.

In 2018, the show formed an in-house band, the Moka Efti Orchestra, to perform the original music from the show. The group plays period-era music in a variety of styles ranging from ragtime to klezmer. Named after the nightclub featured in Babylon Berlin, the Moka Efti Orchestra is a 14-member group and is fronted by the Lithuanian actress Severija Janušauskaitė as Svetlana Sorokina. In the first double episode of the first season, Janušauskaitė's character, crossdressing as the male singer Nikoros, performs the main theme of the series, "Zu Asche, zu Staub" in the Moka Efti cabaret. This song was later released and charted on the German singles chart.

The group performed in concert in May 2018 and, due to popular demand, toured the country later that year. With the release of the third season of the show, the musical group released their debut album Erstausgabe (English: First Edition).

In addition to period music, "Dance Away", from the 1979 album Manifesto by Roxy Music, plays occasionally in the background (adapted to the style of the period) and also included is an adaptation of "These Foolish Things" and, in the Season Two finale, a Russian version of "Gloomy Sunday". Singer Bryan Ferry of Roxy Music appears toward the end of the first season as a cabaret singer performing "Bitter-Sweet", half in English, half in German, from the 1974 album Country Life.

A major action sequence in season two takes place during a performance of The Threepenny Opera. The song "Die Moritat von Mackie Messer" ("The Ballad of Mack the Knife") is featured in that scene, and also as a plot device. Two different characters hum the tune, giving detective Rath clues to the unfolding plot.

=== Locations ===
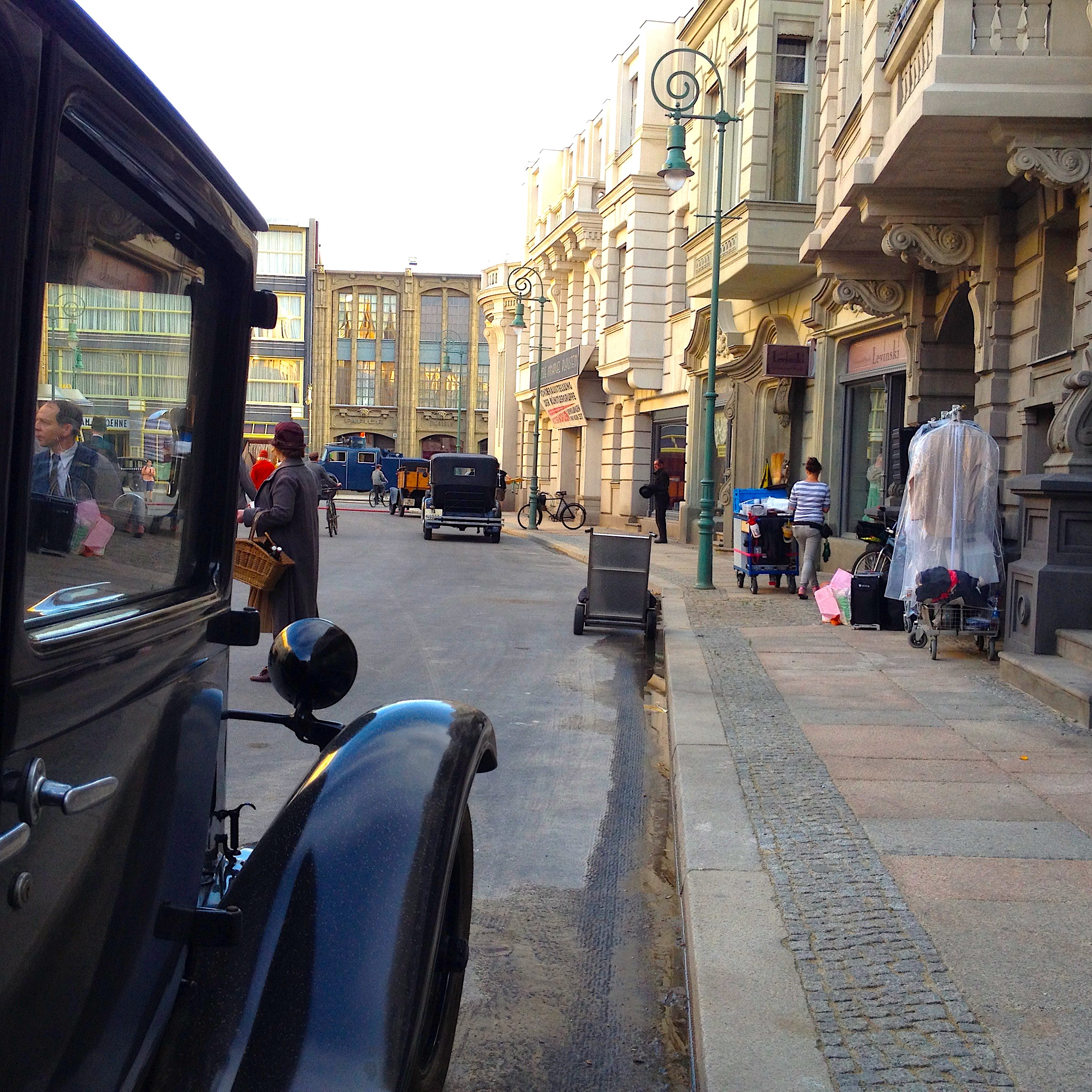
Production of Babylon Berlin at Babelsberg Studio's Metropolitan Backlot, 2016

Babelsberg Studio constructed a massive addition to its Metropolitan Backlot for the filming of the series and for future productions. This permanent standing set is billed as one of the largest in Europe. The set includes recreations of various Berlin neighbourhoods, from a range of economic classes. It also includes the large exterior of the night club Moka Efti.

The series was also filmed on location throughout Berlin and in the surrounding state of Brandenburg. Numerous scenes were filmed on Alexanderplatz in front of the historic Alexanderhaus. The police headquarters, once located directly behind it, and other surrounding buildings, which were all destroyed in WWII, were recreated with CGI.

The Rotes Rathaus (Berlin City Hall) was used for most closeup scenes involving the exterior of the police headquarters, because its red brick appearance and architectural style are very similar. Interiors of the police headquarters lobby were filmed at the Rathaus Schöneberg, including scenes with its paternoster elevator, while the Ratskeller restaurant in the same building was used as the nearby café Aschinger in multiple scenes. Other interior scenes in the police headquarters were filmed in the historic Robert-Koch-Forum.

Interior scenes in the Moka Efti were filmed at the 'Delphi Cinema' in Berlin-Weissensee. Bar Tausend, in Berlin served as the show's Holländer Bar. A lengthy suspense sequence set during a performance of The Threepenny Opera, was filmed at the historic Theater am Schiffbauerdamm, where the play actually ran at the time. The Immanuelkirche in Prenzlauer Berg was used for scenes of Anno and Helga's wedding. The headquarters of the Katholischer Studentenverein Askania-Burgundia Berlin, located in a villa in Dahlem, were used for the residence of Councillor Benda and his family.

The atrium of the Behrensbau was used as Dr. Schmidt's psychiatric clinic. The interiors and exteriors of the historic former Deutsche Bank headquarters complex were used as numerous locations in the series, including as the exterior of the Soviet Embassy. Because the complex was empty at the time of filming, it was also used as the production headquarters, and to house the show's thousands of costumes. Other scenes were filmed on Museum Island, in the Hermannplatz U-Bahn station, at the Hoppegarten Racecourse, and the Church of the Redeemer on the Havel river in Potsdam.

Portions of the series were filmed in the state of North Rhine-Westphalia. Scenes set at Schloss Liebenberg, the estate of the Nyssen family, were filmed at Schloss Drachenburg, a castle in the Rhineland. The Rheinisches Industriebahn-Museum in Cologne was used as the Anhalter Güterbahnhof. The Landschaftspark Duisburg-Nord, a disused steel plant near Duisburg, was used as the factory adjacent to Bruno Wolter's apartment, in which numerous sequences take place.

Scenes involving a steam train were filmed in the state of Bavaria at the Bavarian Railway Museum near Nördlingen.

New locations were introduced in Season 3. Berlin's Old City Hall served as the interior and exterior of the Berlin Stock Exchange. The Ullsteinhaus was used as the editorial offices of the Tempo newspaper, which were actually located there at the time. The Kammergericht in Berlin served as the Ministry of the Reichswehr. The Cafe Grosz doubled for the historic Romanisches Café, destroyed in WWII.

The District Council Hall of the Rathaus Treptow was used for the court room for both Greta's trial in Season 3 and Katelbach's trial in Season 4. The Gästehaus am Lehnitzsee, a hotel housed in the historic Landhaus Adlon, the pre-WWII mansion of Louis Adlon, manager of the famed Hotel Adlon, was used as the villa of Edgar and Esther Kasabian.

New locations introduced in Season 4 include the Karl-Marx-Allee, used in multiple episodes as the Kurfürstendamm; the Amtsgericht Wedding, the exterior and interior of which appear in multiple episodes as the Landgericht Berlin-Mitte; and the GASAG Building on Littenstraße, used as the Berlin headquarters of the Nazi Party.

In Season 5, the Plenary Hall of Hamburg City Hall was used as the same room in Berlin's Reichstag building. The Volksbühne theater in Berlin was used for the interiors and exteriors of the Presseball. A historic speech by Otto Wels in the Lustgarten was recreated on location, in front of the Berlin Cathedral. The Pasewalk military hospital scenes were filmed at Schloss Schulzendorf. The main building of Humboldt University of Berlin, on Unter den Linden, was used as the Palace of the Reich President, which was destroyed in WWII. The cafe of the defunct historic Savoy Hotel was used as the cafe where the Tempo employees frequently meet. Clärchen's Ballroom was used for the interior of the Haus Vaterland.

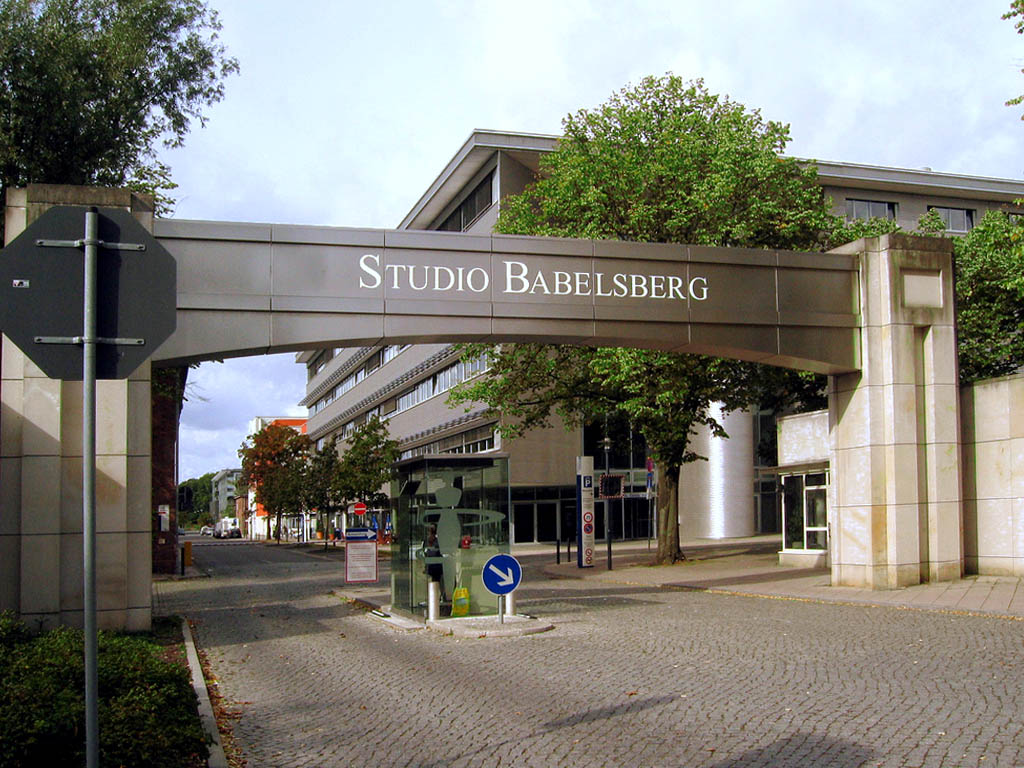
Babelsberg Studio in Potsdam

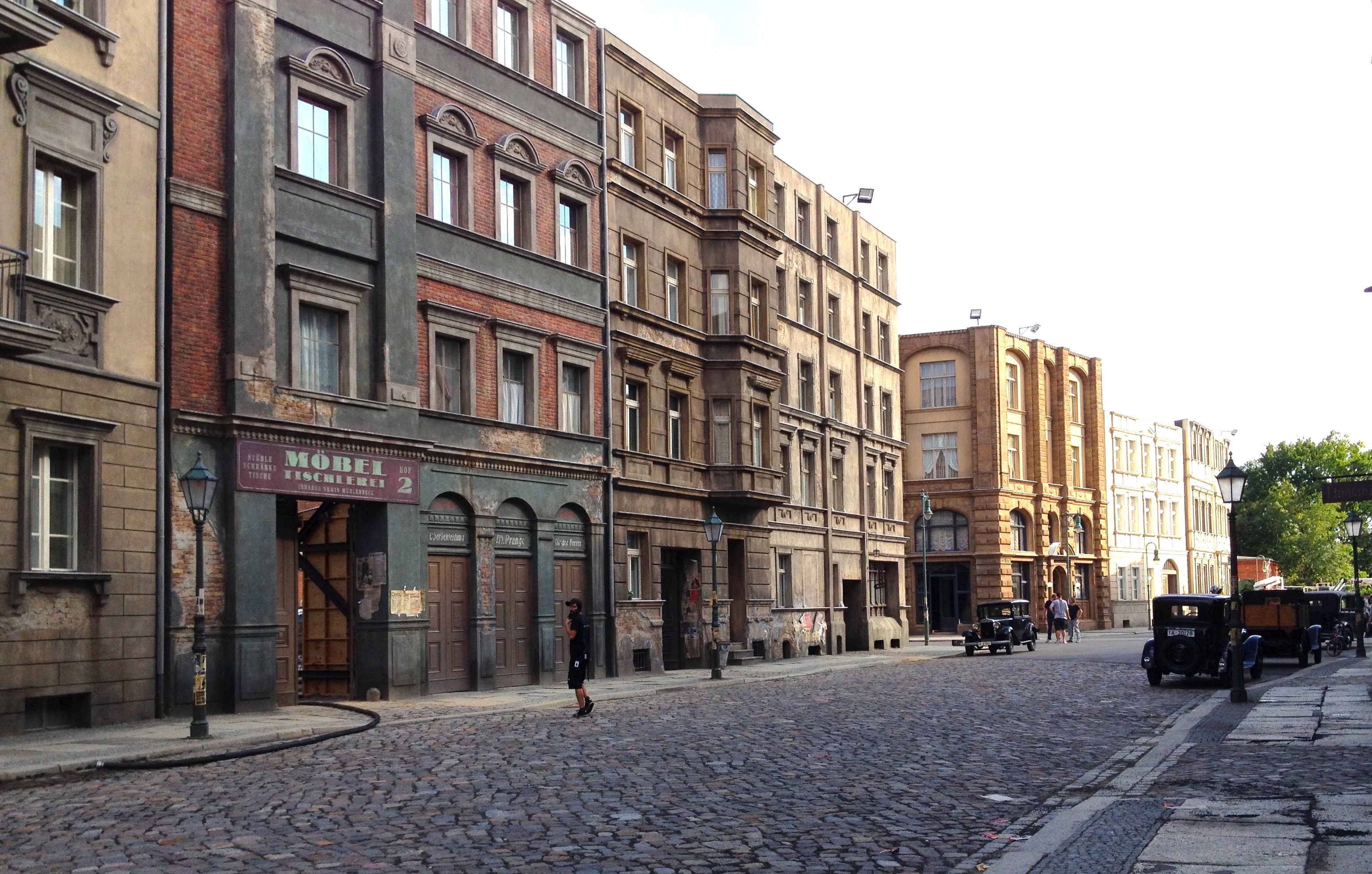
Production of Babylon Berlin on the Metropolitan Backlot, 2016

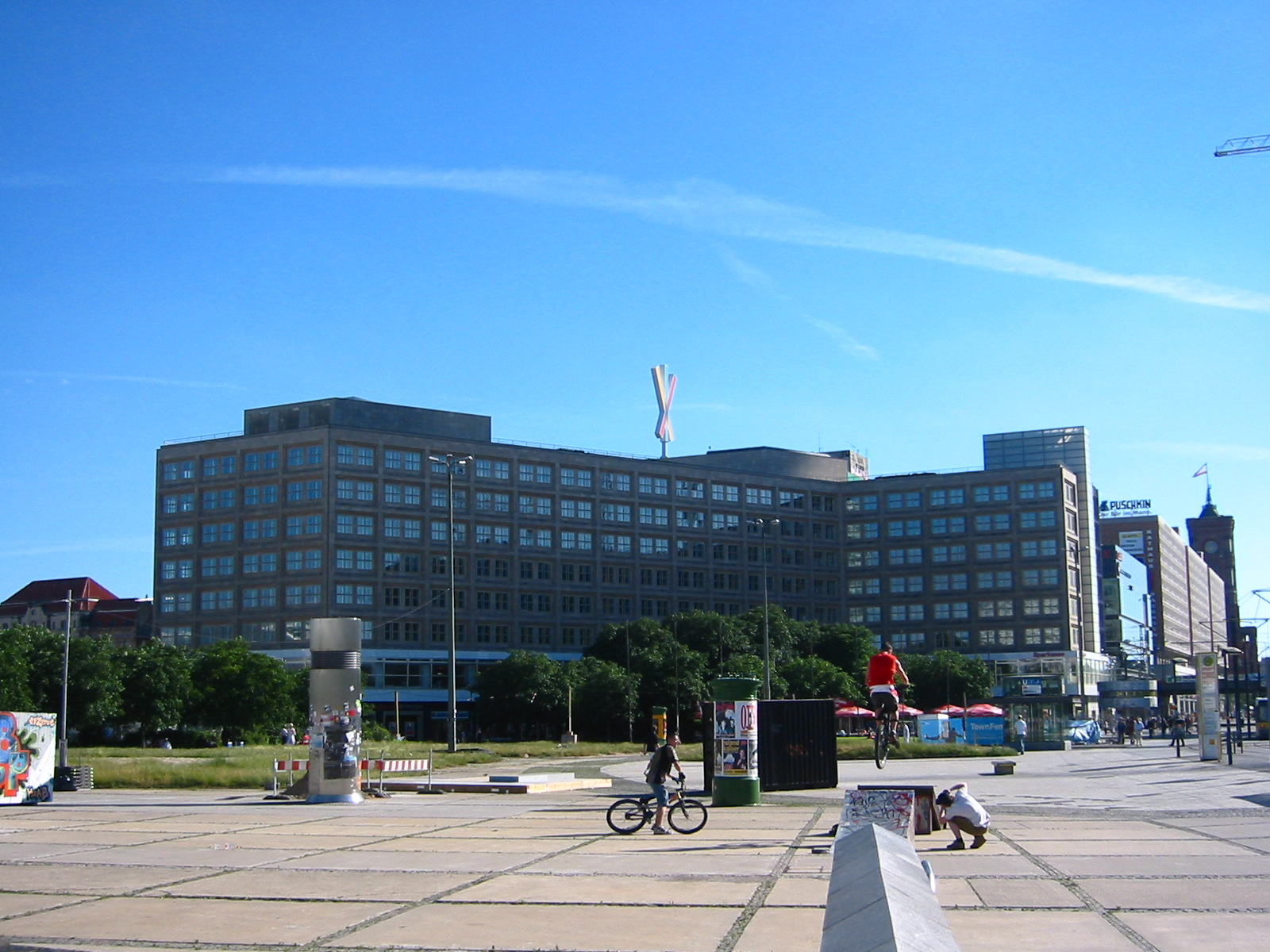
Alexanderhaus, on Alexanderplatz

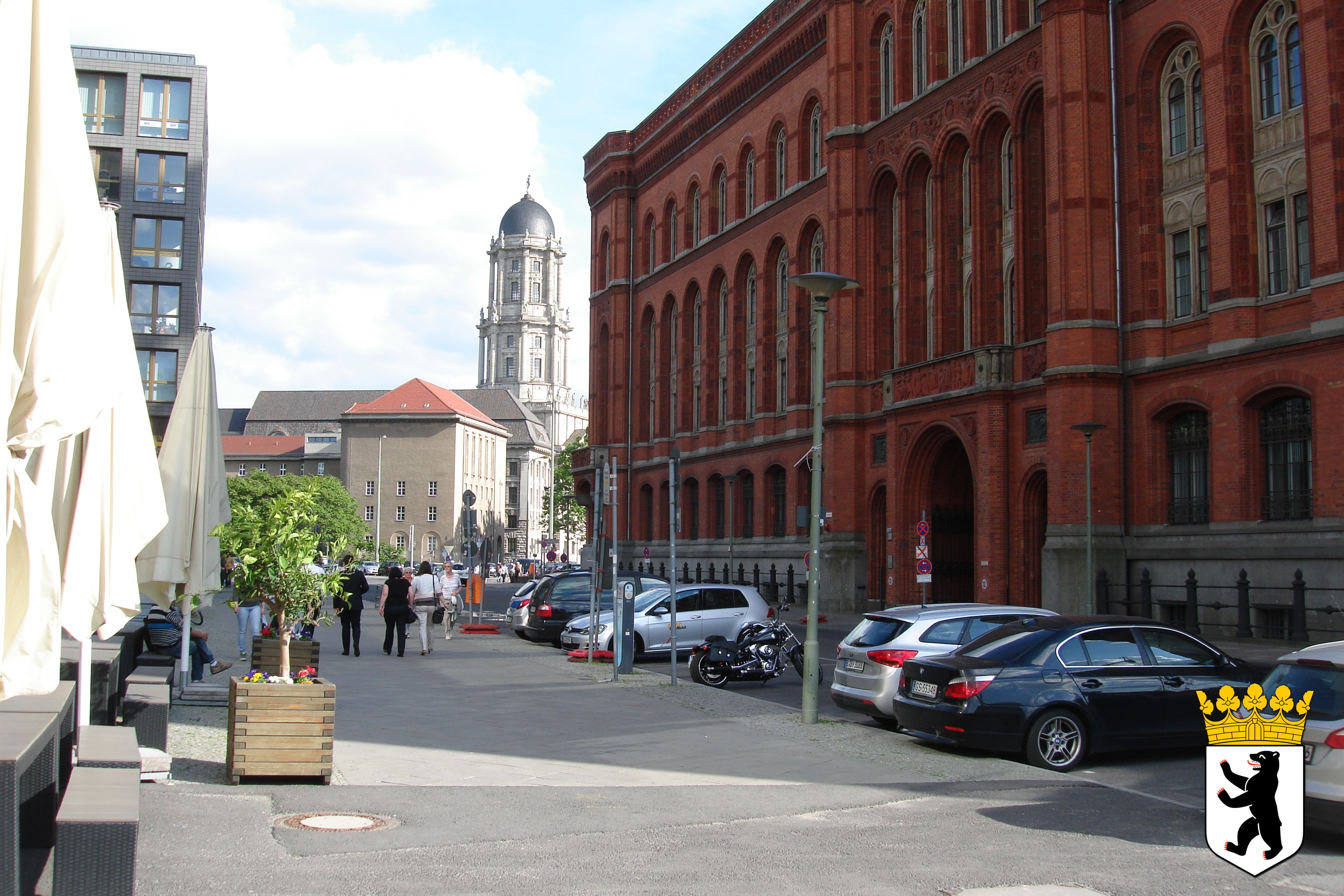
Side entrance of the Berlin City Hall, used as Police Headquarters

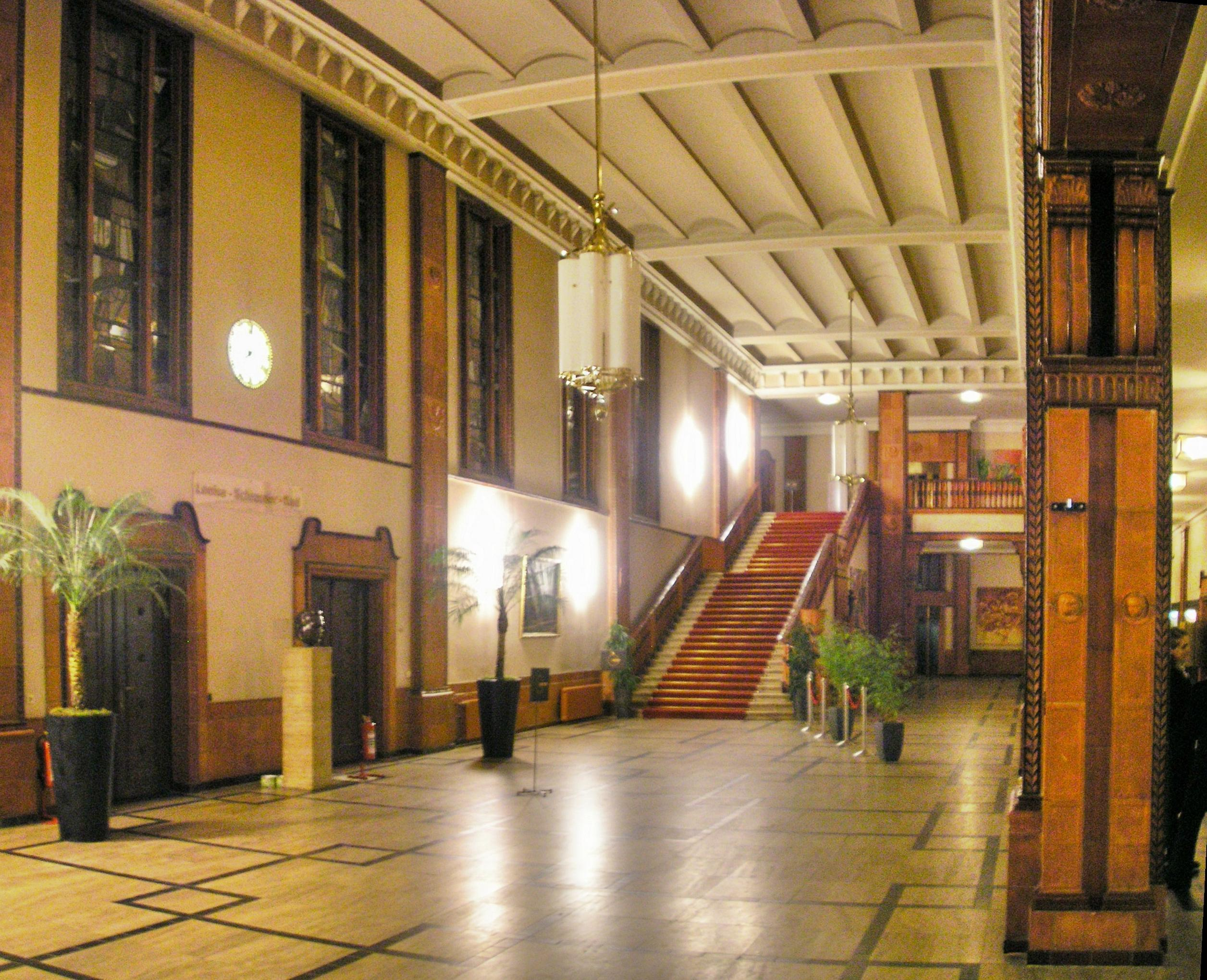
The lobby of the Rathaus Schöneberg, used as the lobby of Police Headquarters

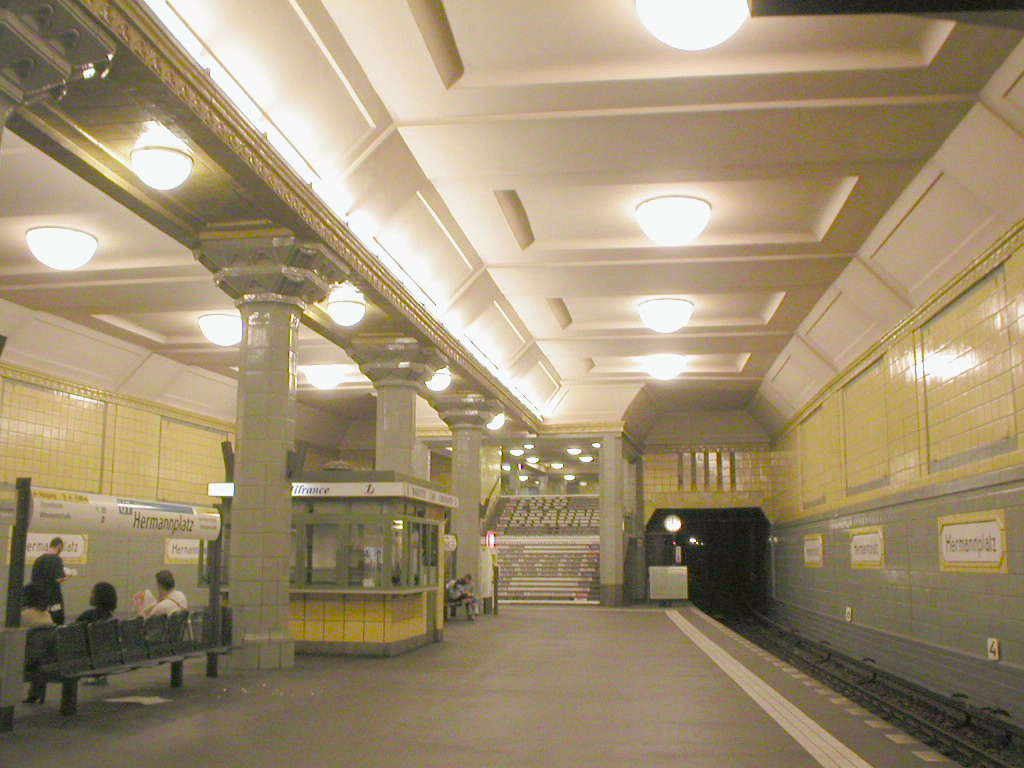
Hermannplatz station in Berlin-Neukölln

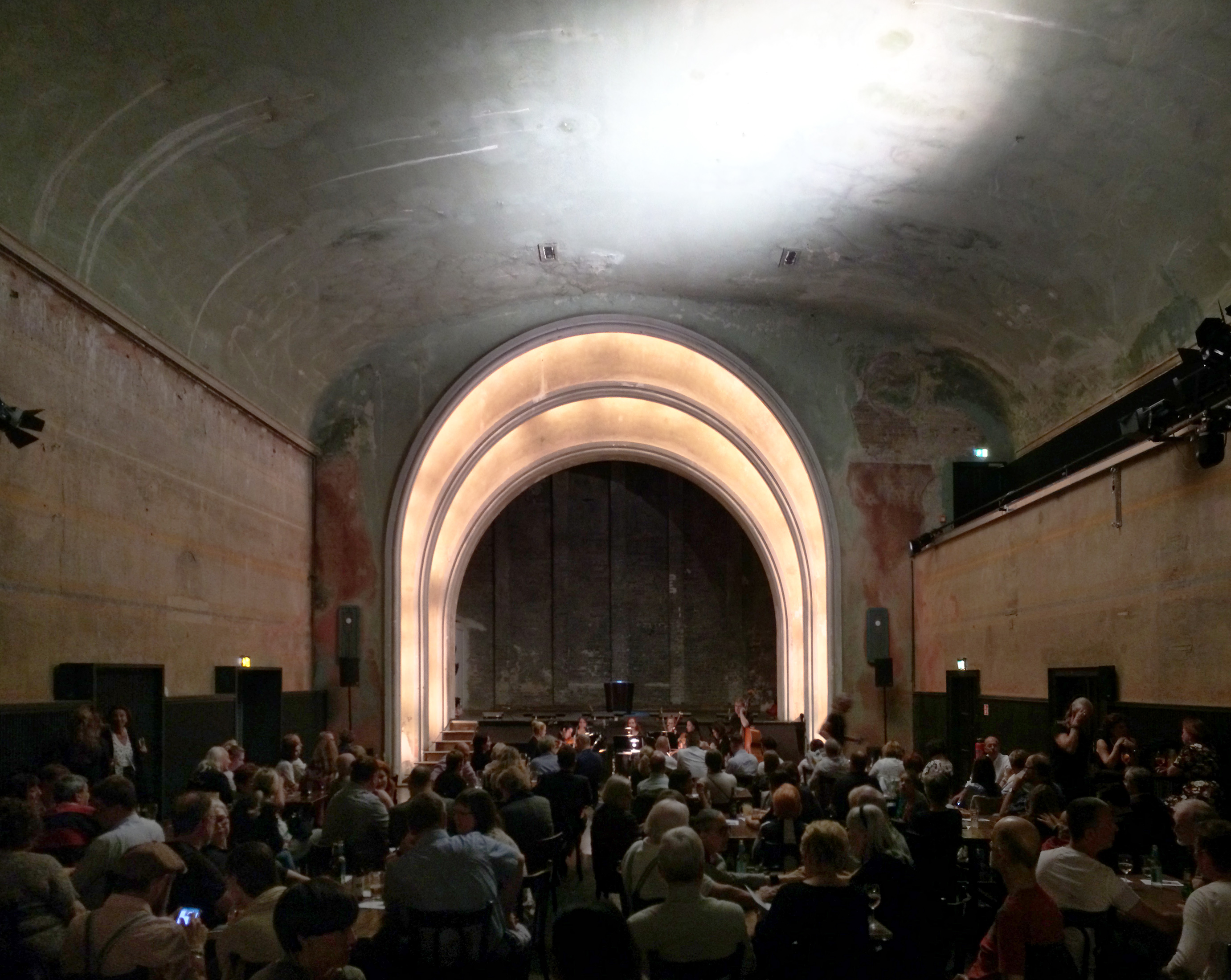
The former Delphi cinema in Berlin-Weissensee, used as the Moka Efti nightclub

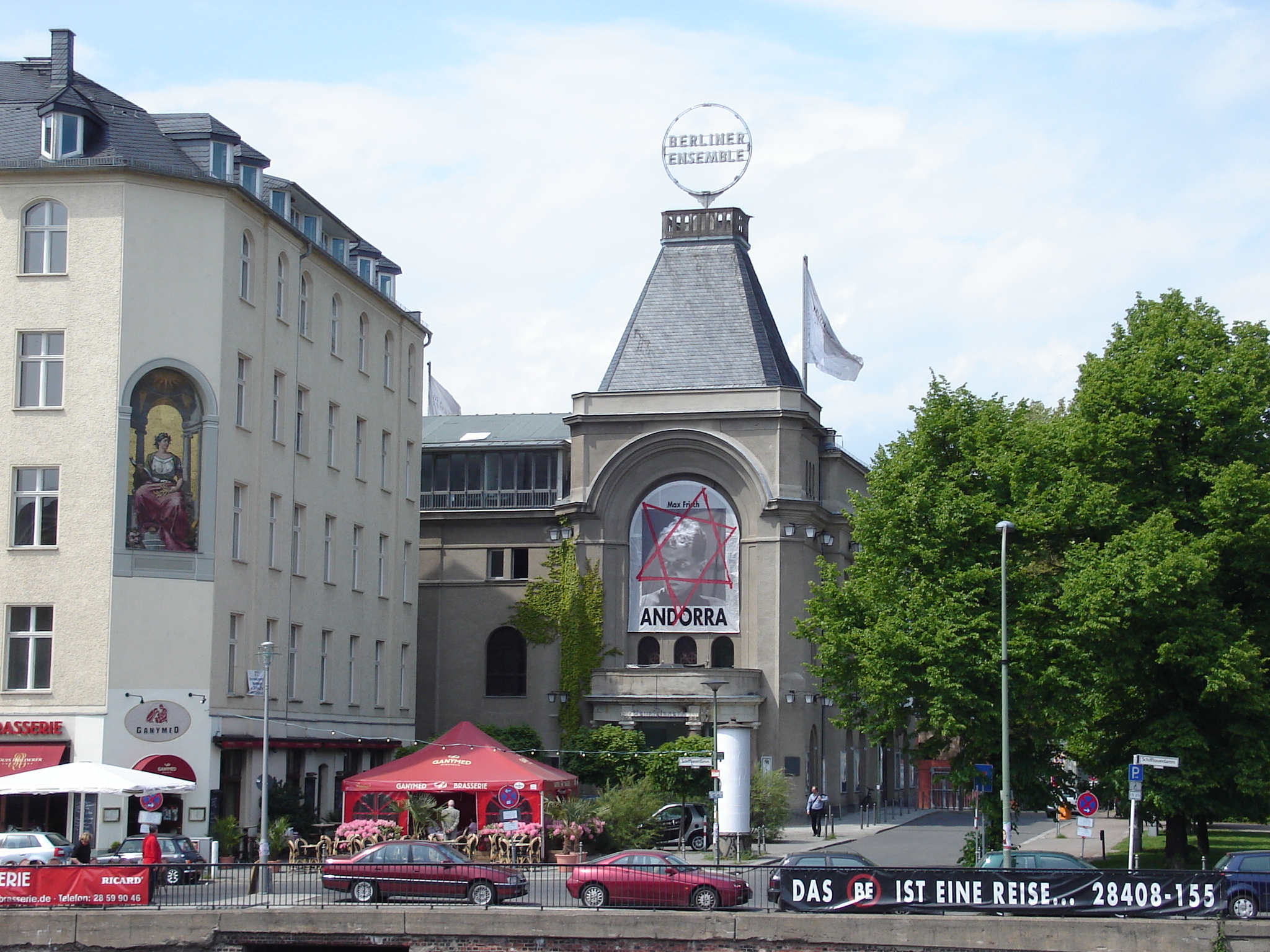
Theater am Schiffbauerdamm, location of The Threepenny Opera sequences

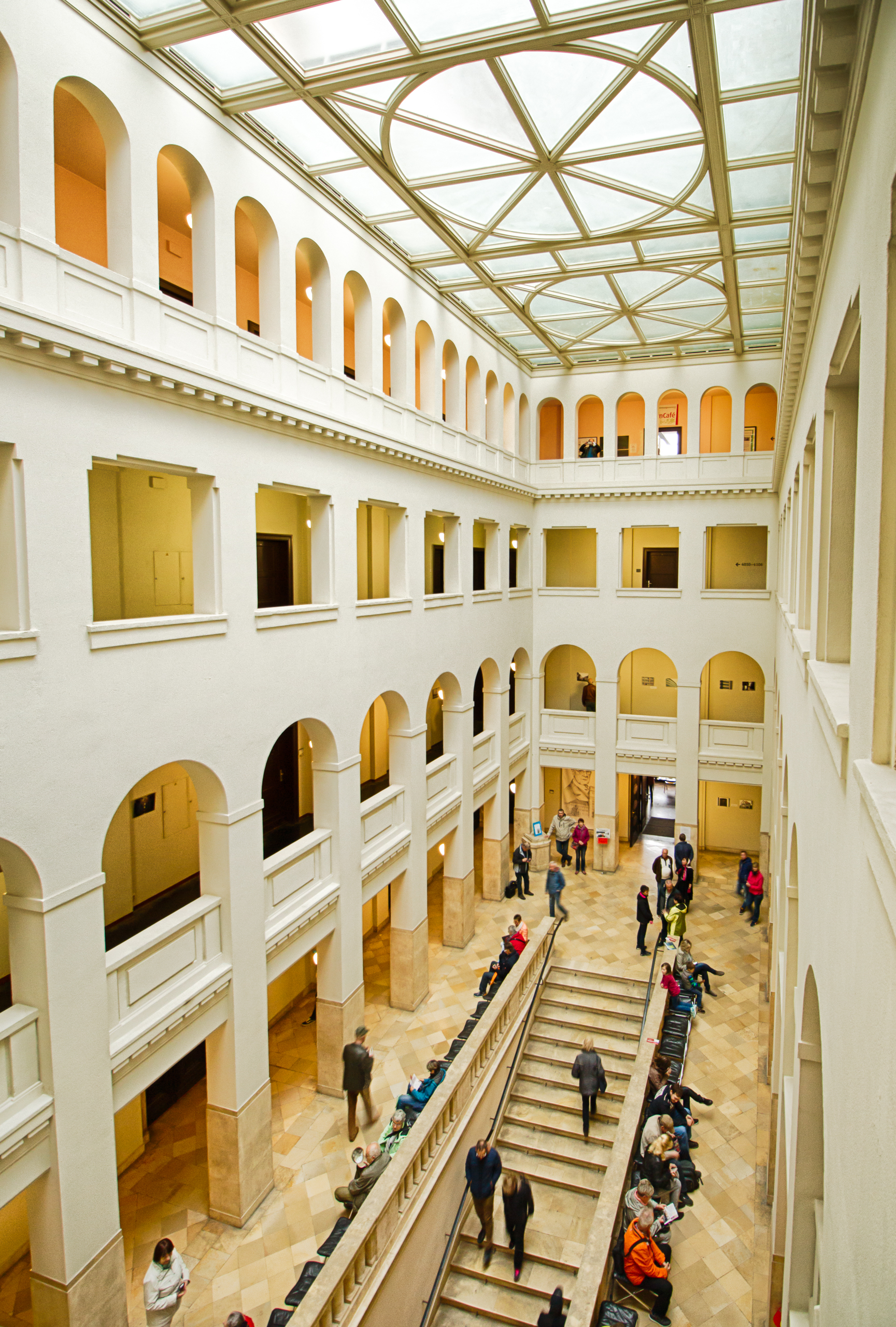
Atrium of the Behrensbau, used as the psychiatric clinic

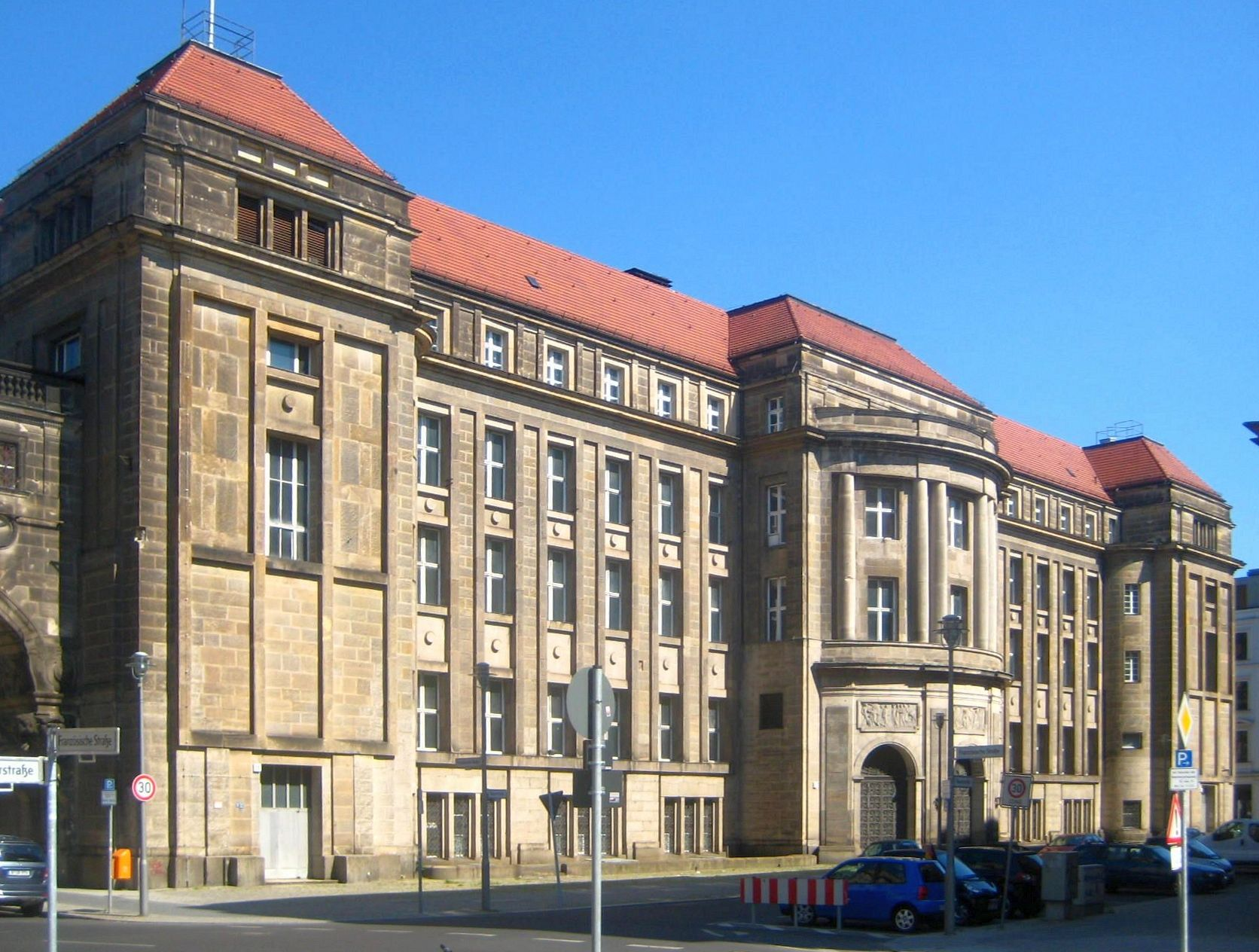
Former Deutsche Bank headquarters, used as the Soviet Embassy

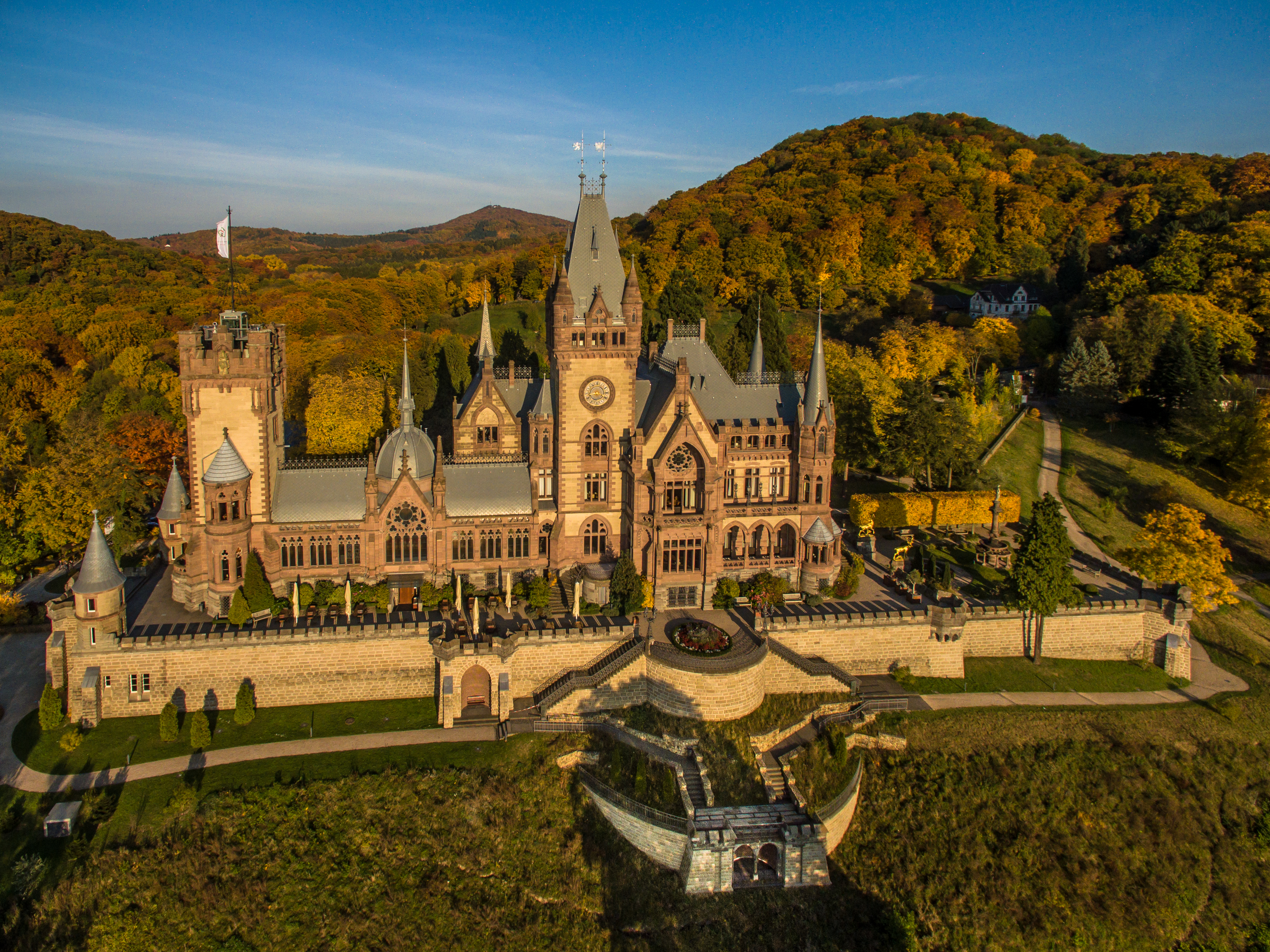
Drachenburg Castle in the Rhineland

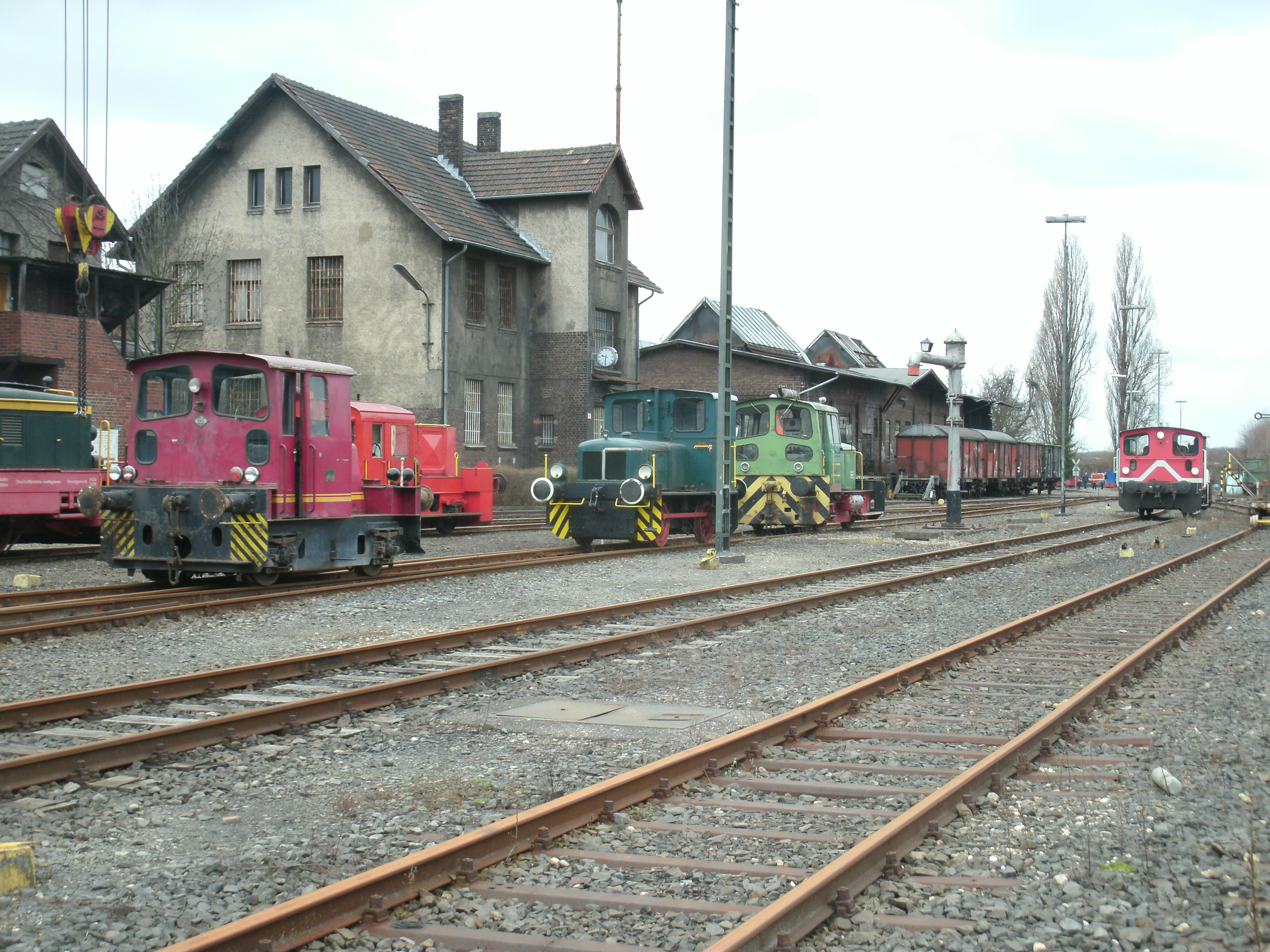
Rheinisches Industriebahn-Museum, used as the Anhalter Güterbahnhof

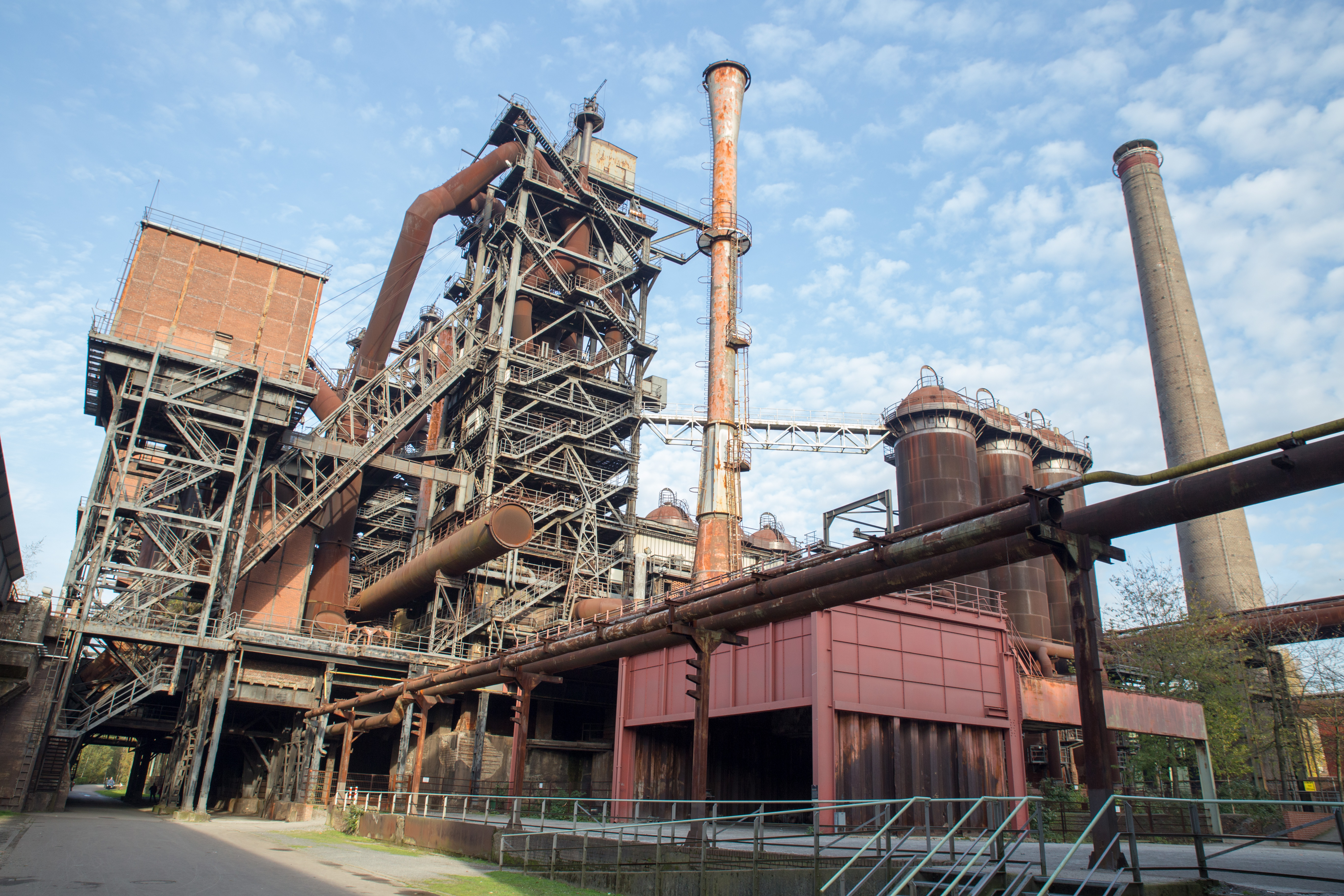
Landschaftspark Duisburg-Nord

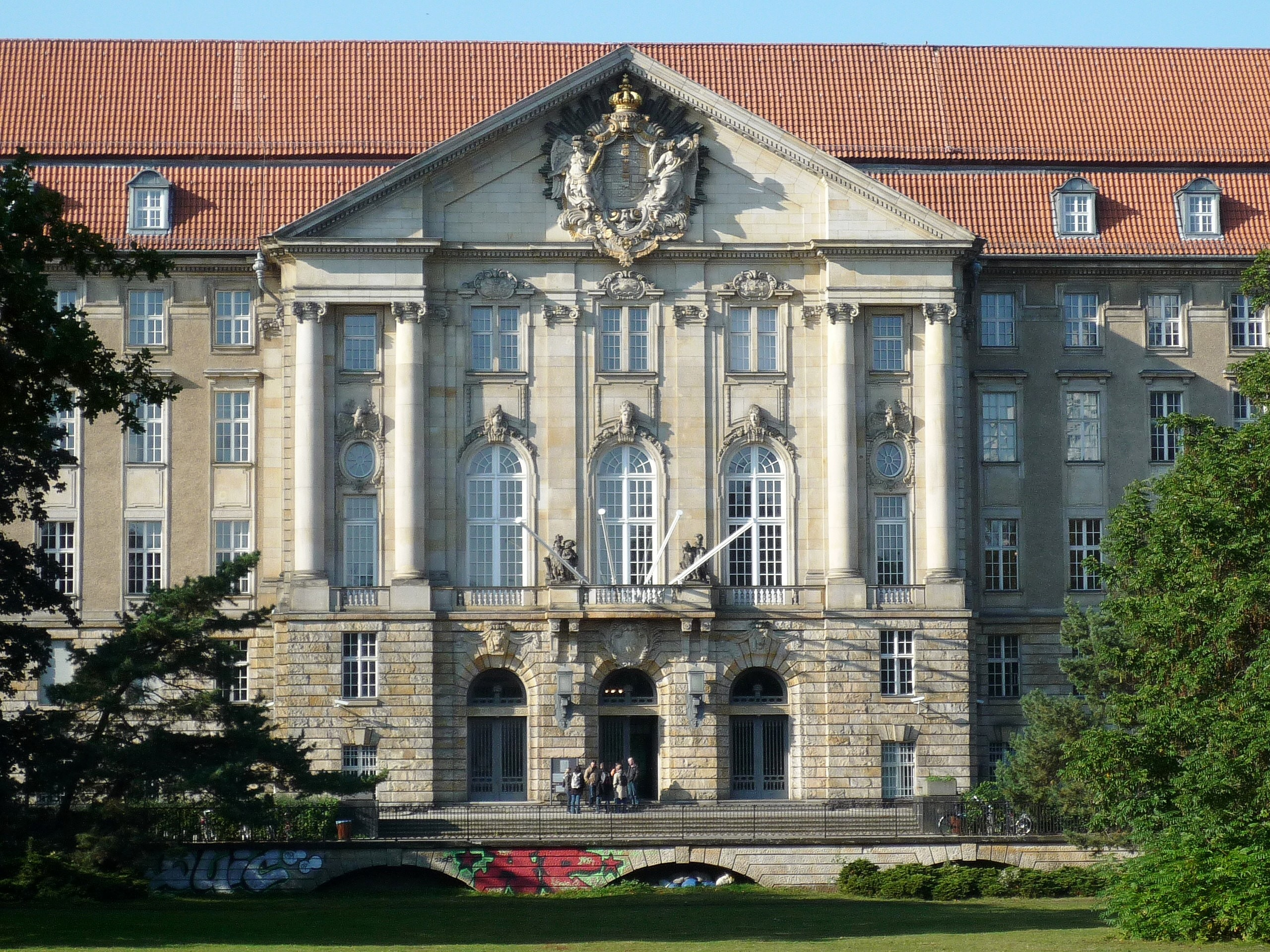
The Kammergericht, used as the Ministry of the Reichswehr in Season 3

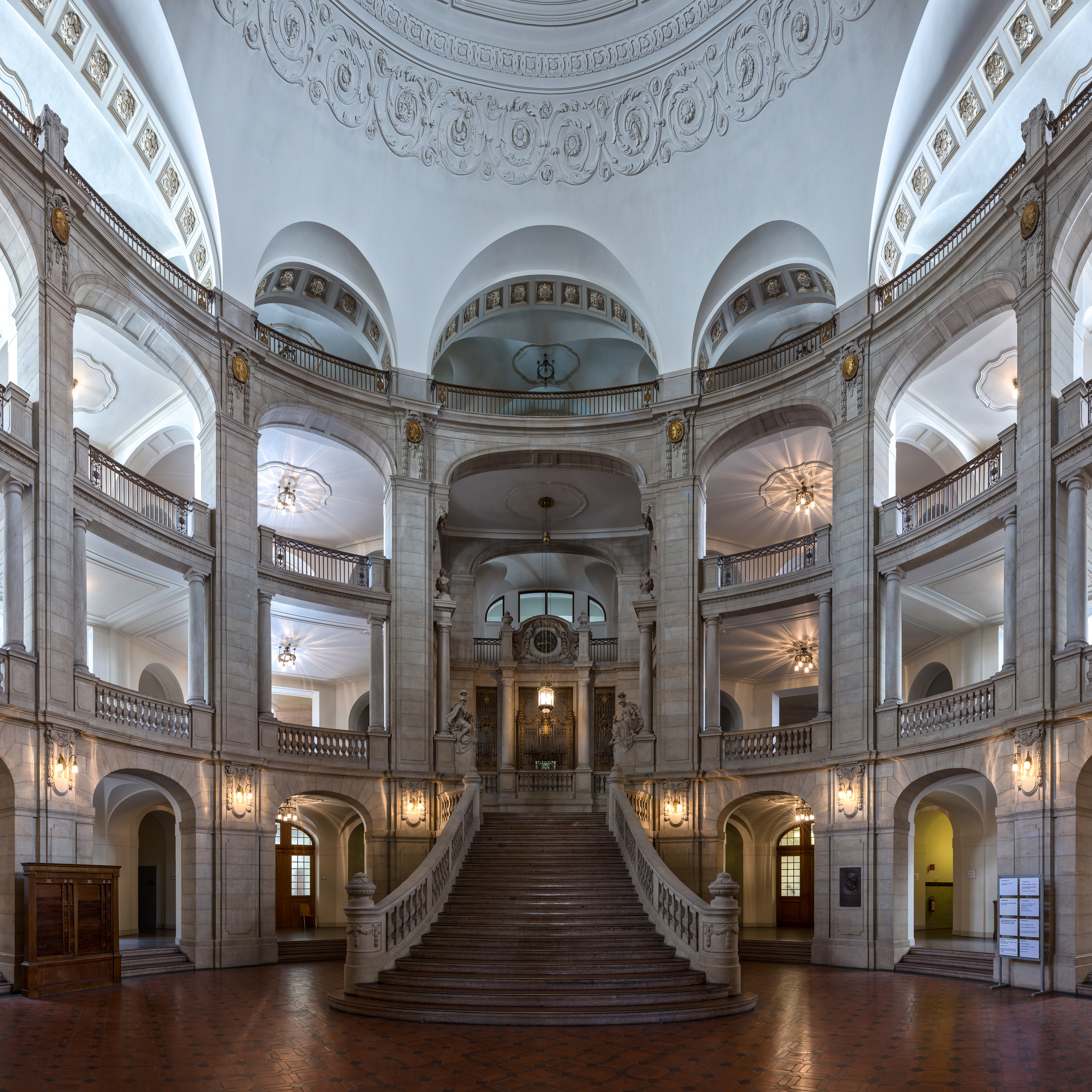
Lobby of the Kammergericht

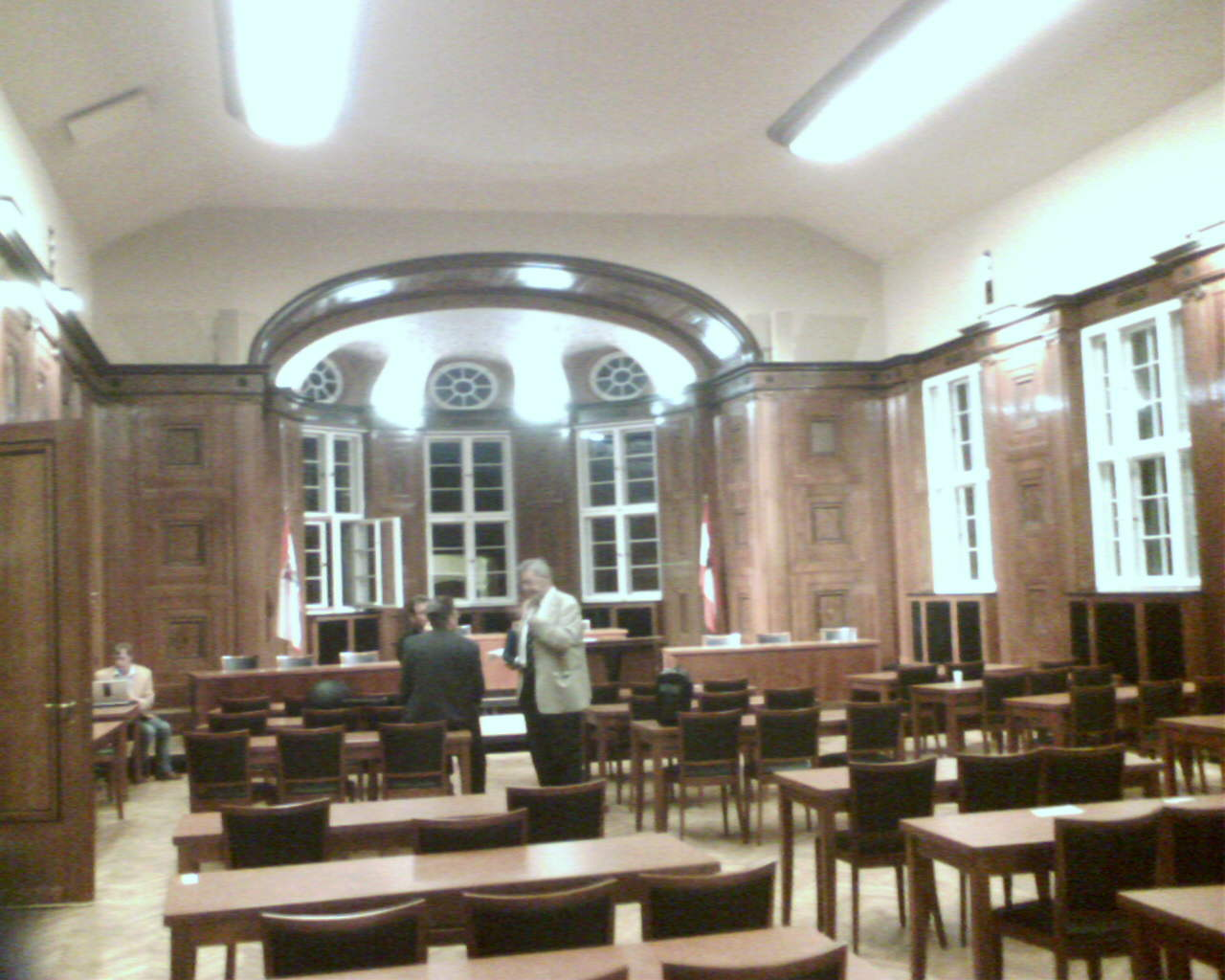
District Council Hall of Rathaus Treptow

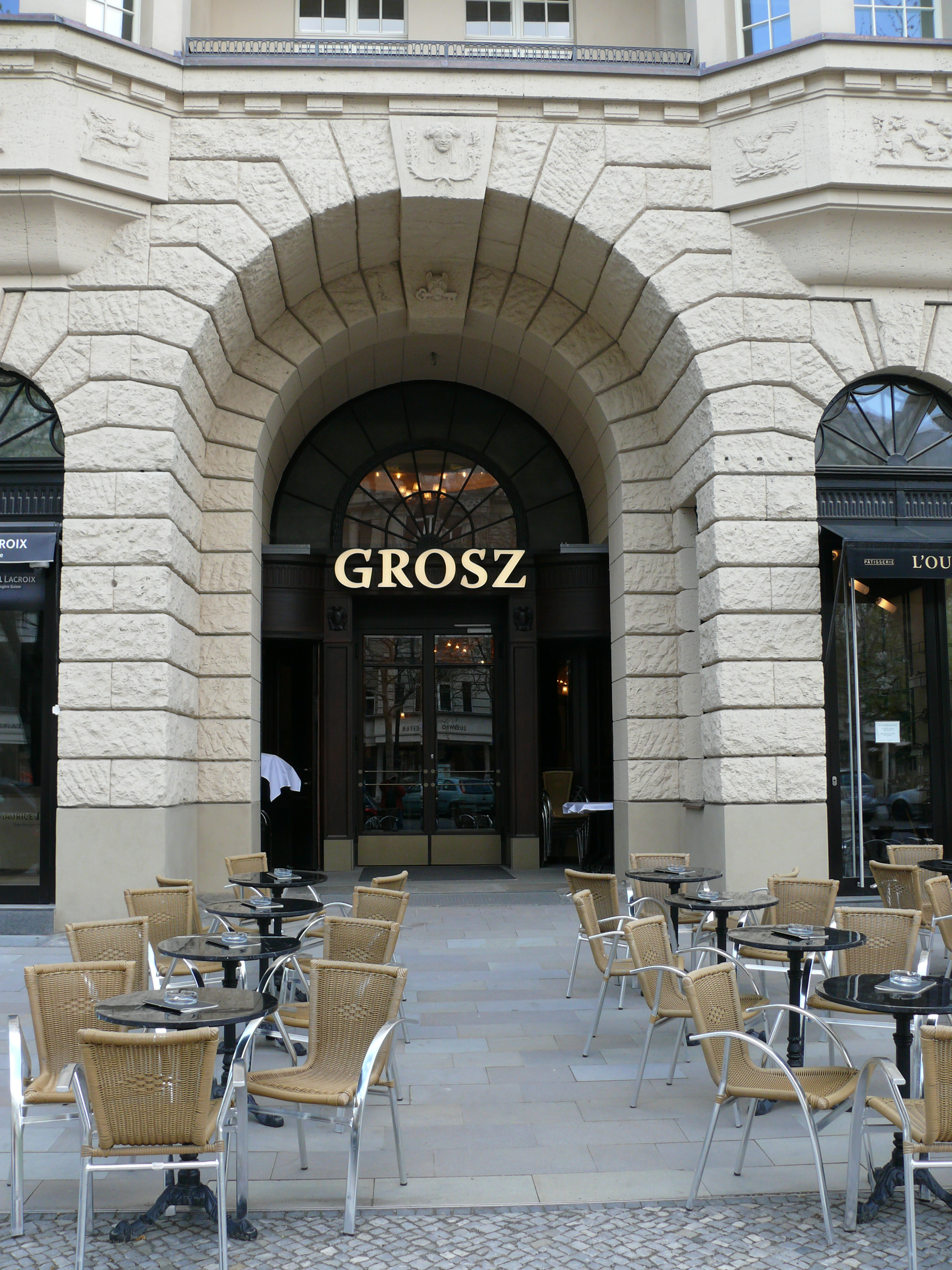
Cafe Grosz was used as the Romanisches Café in Season 3

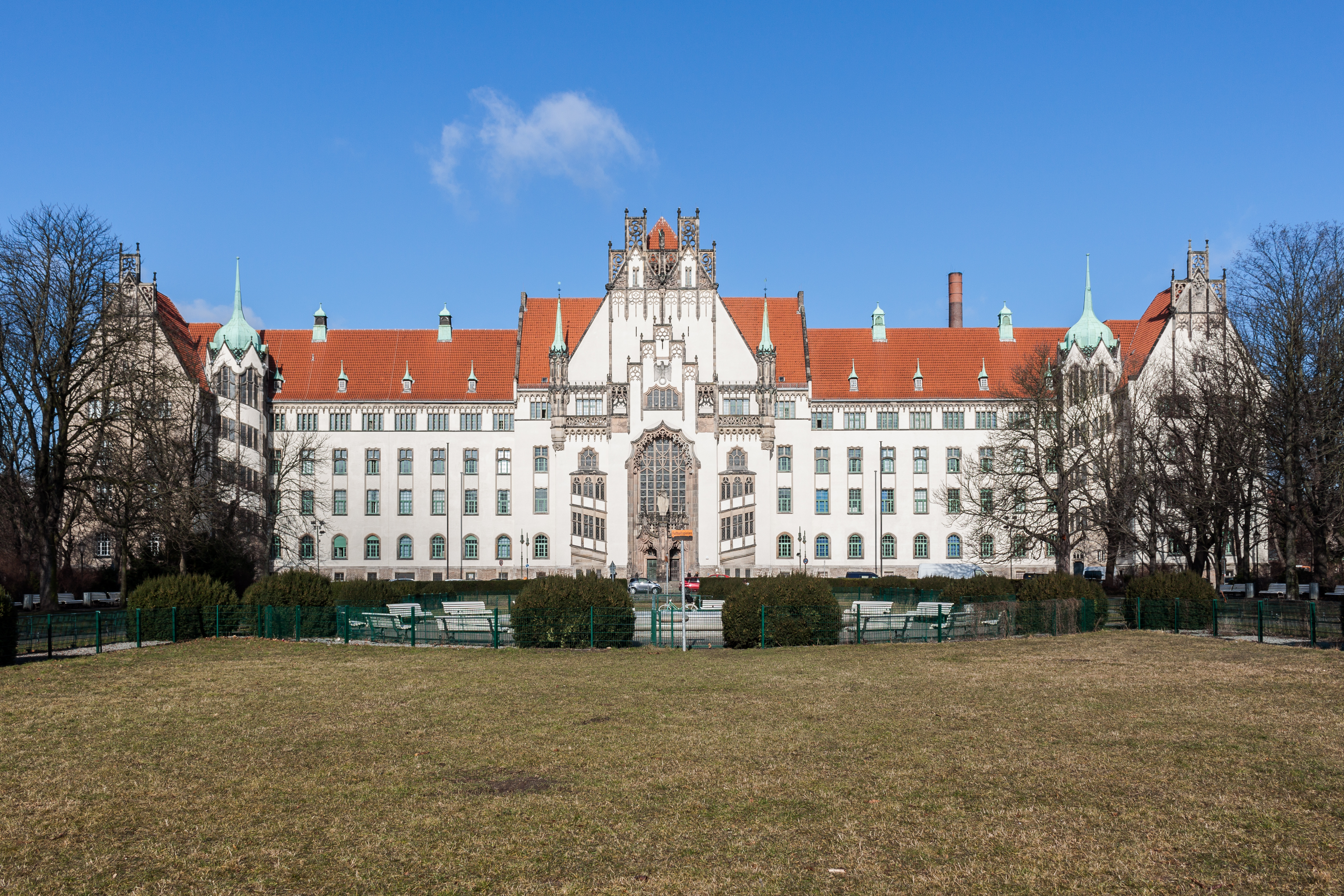
Amtsgericht Wedding, used as the Landgericht Berlin-Mitte in Season 4

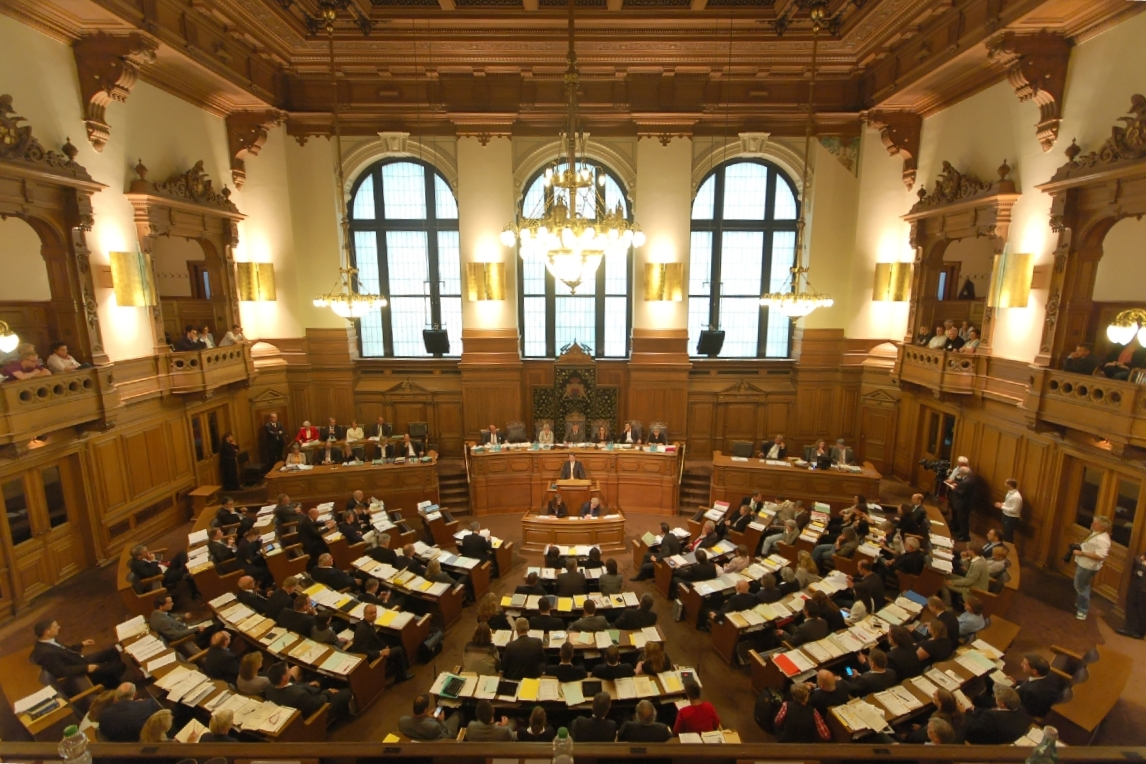
Hamburg City Hall Plenary Hall, used as the Reichstag in Season 5

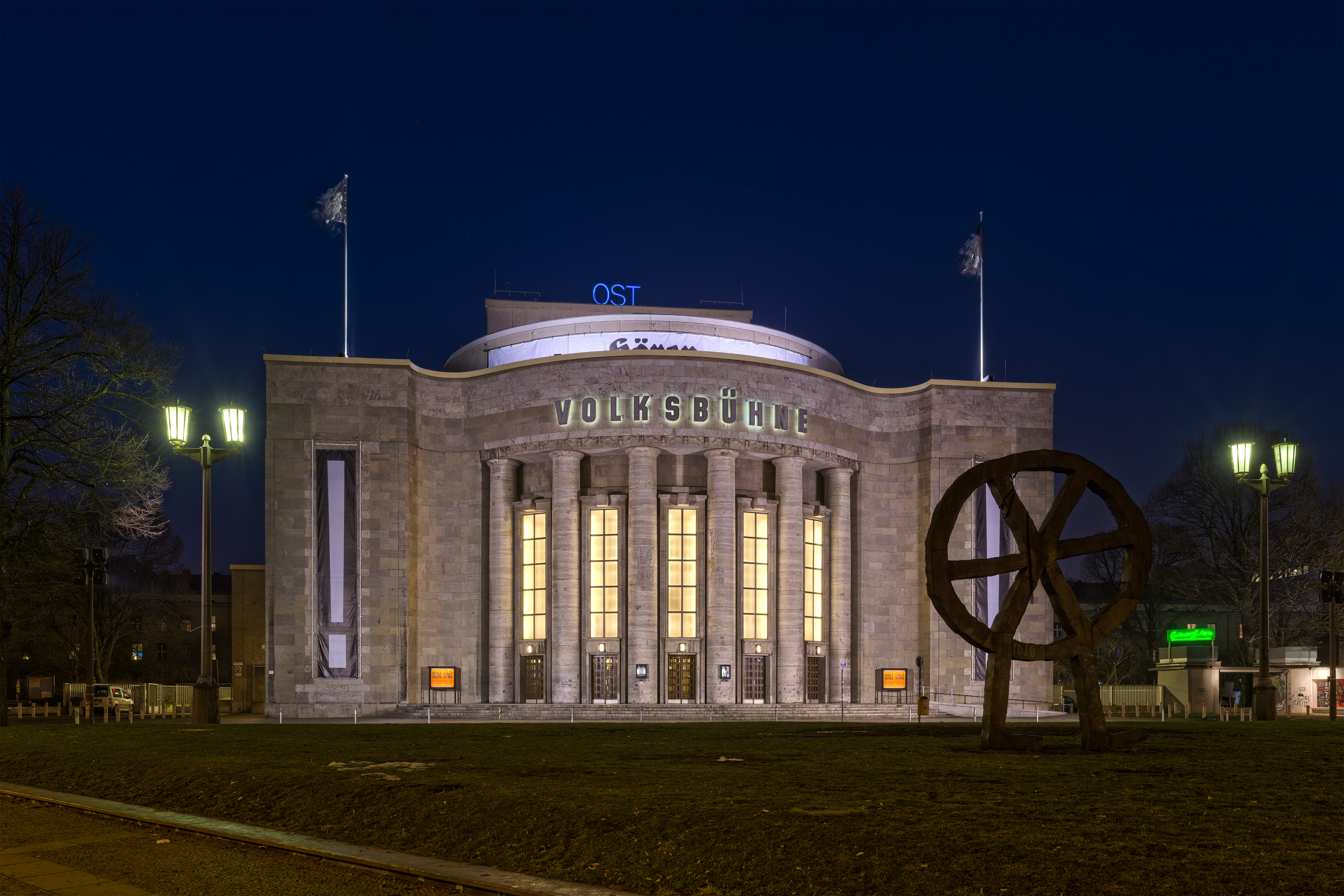
Volksbühne in Berlin, used for the Presseball in Season 5

== Broadcast ==
Babylon Berlin premiered in Germany on 13 October 2017 (Sky 1) and in the United Kingdom and the Republic of Ireland on Sunday, 5 November 2017 (Sky Atlantic). The series debuted in Australia, Canada, and the United States on 30 January 2018 (Netflix). The series premiered on the German TV channel Das Erste and ARD's streaming service ARD Mediathek on 30 September 2018. The Swedish broadcast began on 19 June 2019 on SVT.

The third season premiered in Germany on Sky 1 in January 2020, and on German public television station ARD in October 2020. In early 2019, the international distribution rights for the third season were sold to more than one hundred countries and many different networks, including Netflix, HBO Europe, and Viaplay.

In territories where the show was distributed by Netflix, the third season was released in its entirety in March 2020. The series was removed from Netflix in February 2024.

All four seasons dropped on the Australian free-to-air streaming service SBS on Demand on 14 March 2024, with the fifth season premiering on 12 November 2026.

The first three seasons of the series began streaming again in the United States on MHz Choice in April 2024. The fourth season made its US premiere on the service in June 2024.

The entire final season premiered in Germany on 10 September 2026 on ARD Mediathek. The first 4 episodes had their premier broadcast on 19 September on Das Erste, the flagship national television channel of ARD, with the final 4 episodes broadcast on 25 September on Das Erste. It has been sold to over 140 countries around the globe, premiering on public broadcaster SBS Television in Australia in 12 November 2026. It is scheduled to air early in 2027 on MHz Choice in the US and Canada.

== Episodes ==
Season	Episodes	Originally released	
Season	Episodes	First released	Last released
1	8	October 13, 2017	November 3, 2017
2	8	November 10, 2017	December 1, 2017
3	12	January 24, 2020	February 28, 2020
4	12	October 8, 2022	November 12, 2022
5	8	September 10, 2026	

=== Season 1 (2017) ===
All episodes were written and directed by Henk Handloegten, Achim von Borries, and Tom Tykwer.

No.	Title	Original release date
1	"Episode 1"	13 October 2017
In April 1929, a train traveling through Russia, bound for Berlin is forced to stop near Novorzhev due to a burning tree lying on the rails. The engine driver and a train worker are ambushed by several armed, Russian-speaking men. The men couple an additional car to the train, and two Russian men replace the Germans, who are killed by gunshots to the head. Gereon Rath, a morphine-addicted World War I veteran who worked as a police inspector in Cologne, is transferred to the vice squad in Berlin. He and his new partner, Bruno Wolter, visit a photographic studio, which is actually a pornographic film set and production studio. As they arrest the owner, Johann König, another man flees and shoots at Gereon but is subdued by Bruno. Bruno doesn't arrest the man, Franz Krajewski, but uses the incident to blackmail him into becoming a police informant. Krajewski is a former policeman who fought in World War I, but afterward was fired from the police when he overreacted in a shoot-out, due to his PTSD. Krajewski goes to a psychotherapist, Dr. Schmidt, telling him that the police have arrested König and are looking for "the film" — which König apparently failed to destroy, contrary to Schmidt's instructions. The therapist later meets with a mysterious man, referred to only as "the Armenian", who says he will deal with the problem. At the police station, Gereon bumps into Charlotte Ritter as they step out of a paternoster lift. She has recently begun a short-term clerical job at the homicide division to provide for her family, who live under pitiable conditions. After gathering up their respective papers scattered on the floor, she and Gereon part ways. A Trotskyist, Alexey Kardakov, receives a telegram alerting him that the train will arrive in Berlin soon. Later, he and his companion, Svetlana Sorokina, convey the good news to a group of fellow Trotskyists at a printing shop.
2	"Episode 2"	13 October 2017
Gereon interrogates Johann König, who earlier was visited in jail by a mysterious man with a message he found disturbing. During the session, König seizes the inspector's handgun and points it at Gereon, but after Gereon informs him his situation is hopeless, König shoots and kills himself. The resulting stress triggers Gereon's PTSD, so he rushes to nearby toilets to take some morphine but is unable to do so because of his severe trembling. Charlotte, in the adjacent stall, finds him and helps him take his drugs. After this incident, Gereon phones his father, who is disappointed that the film has not been found, but urges his son to destroy it should it reappear. Gereon and Bruno are summoned to the office of August Benda, head of the political police, to explain injuries König sustained before his death, but neither admits they resulted from Bruno's torture during an earlier interrogation. During a private conversation, Benda asks Gereon why he has transferred to Berlin. Gereon admits that the mayor of Cologne, Konrad Adenauer, a close friend of Gereon's family, is being blackmailed with a film that is said to be in Berlin — and has asked Gereon to find it before the elections. Later, Gereon meets with Krajewski, now acting as an informant, who says he knows nothing about who König worked for, but that they paid him well. However, he recognizes a woman in a photo he's shown, one that Gereon found among the films the police confiscated in the studio raid. At night, Charlotte visits the Moka Efti, a popular variety theatre. She listens to a singer called Nikoros, who is actually Svetlana in disguise. Charlotte takes one of the patrons to the club's basement which houses a brothel, where she works as a sex worker to supplement her family's income. Svetlana visits the Soviet embassy in disguise, giving an official there a list of her fellow Trotskyists' names and location, and identifying Kardakov as the group's leader. Later, in a nighttime raid, nearly all the Trotskyists at the printing shop are shot to death by gunmen from the Soviet embassy. But Kardakov survives the attack by hiding in a latrine.
3	"Episode 3"	20 October 2017
The Russian train arrives in Berlin. Svetlana appears at the railway and meets the engine driver. As she tells German railroad officials that the last car will be redirected to Paris instead of Istanbul as originally planned, the driver becomes suspicious of the change. Svetlana threatens him with a gun but is stopped by the Germans and arrested. The driver runs away to Kardakov's boarding house, which happens to be where Gereon is living. The next day, Zörgiebel, the police chief, says in a speech to the police that communist associations have planned to demonstrate on 1 May even though such rallies have been banned in Berlin. When Gereon refuses to tell Bruno anything about his conversation with Benda, Bruno gets angry and arranges for the two of them to oversee the demonstrations together. Gereon returns to his rooming house, where he finds the landlady, Elisabeth Behnke, bound and gagged. He also finds the Russian engine driver sleeping in his room, and they get into a fistfight. The driver escapes over Gereon's balcony and down onto the street — where he is immediately kidnapped by men from the Soviet embassy who were there seeking Kardakov. Gereon tries to intervene, but fails to save him. The driver is taken to a warehouse where he is interrogated by Trokhin, an official who works at the Soviet embassy. The driver admits that the train is loaded with a large number of gold bars belonging to Svetlana Sorokina.
4	"Episode 4"	20 October 2017
During the 1 May demonstrations, Gereon and Bruno search apartments of alleged communists, but find no incriminating evidence. As they leave, armed police riding in vehicles randomly fire at the crowds, which horrifies Gereon. He and Bruno flee into a nearby house where two civilian women standing on a balcony are hit by police bullets and seriously wounded. Gereon is able to find Dr. Völcker, a female doctor who treats poor people and is a member of the Communist Party of Germany (KPD). However, the wounded women die before Völcker and Gereon can reach them. Later, Gereon and Charlotte, who now compiles reports for the homicide squad, go to the morgue to examine the recently discovered body of the Russian engine driver. Charlotte points out how the victim's bruises are even and that he therefore probably did not die from natural causes. Gereon identifies the corpse as that of the man who had broken into his rooming house. Charlotte meets Greta, an old friend, and takes her to the Moka Efti. Bruno arranges to meet Charlotte at the Moka Efti and blackmails her into spying on Gereon.
5	"Episode 5"	27 October 2017
Kardakov is shot by Svetlana after she calls the Soviets to her apartment. Dr. Völcker leads a mass rally in front of the police station to protest the killings by police during the Blutmai riot. The police respond by holding a press conference claiming self-defence and, as evidence, decorating a wounded a police officer — who in reality had been accidentally shot by his toddler with his gun. Gereon continues to investigate the photograph. Acting on a tip from Gereon, Charlotte breaks into Svetlana's apartment to investigate and finds a book dropped by Kardakov, evidently recently. Kardakov, injured but still alive, tells the Armenian about the Sorokin gold. Gereon and Charlotte interview a man named Trechkov who, they've learned, knows Kardakov and Svetlana through his work performing music with them. He gives them the location of the printing house, which is also the Trotskyites' headquarters known as the Red Fortress.
6	"Episode 6"	27 October 2017
Kardakov goes to the Armenian for help. Gereon's housemate Katelbach asks him for help investigating the wounded police officer, given the sparse information on him that has been released to the public. Stephan invites Charlotte and Greta to the rowing club where Greta meets Fritz, a KPD member. Gereon struggles to write a report on the riot shootings that is favourable to the police, despite pressure from Zörgiebel, the police chief. Major General Seegers discusses Operation Prangertag on Nyssen's family estate. Bruno helps Gereon find Krajewski, and they take him into custody for questioning. Kardakov goes with the Armenian and his men to the railway yard to find the gold, but instead accidentally releases poison gas from a railcar that was deliberately mislabelled.
7	"Episode 7"	3 November 2017
Greta is employed by Benda as a servant in his home despite her inexperience. Dr. Schmidt conducts a lecture on PTSD, which is denounced by the audience. A mysterious priest provides a barbiturate to Gereon's pharmacist to give him in place of his usual morphine. Charlotte investigates the Anhalter freight yard as the railcars are being inspected by the Soviets. Benda, accompanied by police officers, takes over their inspection and informs Gereon that he is investigating the possible illegal importing of weapons by the Black Reichswehr. Charlotte takes Stephan to investigate the Red Fortress's operation at the printing shop. Bruno invites Gereon to a Black Reichswehr gathering, whose attendees share stab-in-the-back stories with each other. Gereon recounts being captured on the front line after carrying his brother from no-man's land.
8	"Episode 8"	3 November 2017
Nyssen is jailed and interrogated by Benda about the chemical weapons found on the train. Later, Svetlana visits Nyssen in jail and confesses to him that she has used him and is responsible for the weapons the police found on the train. Benda's family goes on a vacation, so Benda has dinner alone with Greta. Krajewski divulges the location of the film to Gereon and Bruno. To retrieve it, Gereon breaks into the safe in the Armenian's private room at the Moka Efti and, after a shoot-out with the Armenian's men, escapes with a number of films. Gereon and Bruno view the films, recognizing several politicians in them, including Gereon's father. Afterward, they destroy all the films. While Gereon and Bruno are out celebrating the investigation's successful outcome, the Armenian's contacts track them down and drug Gereon. As Gereon is pursued by the priest, he loses consciousness.

=== Season 2 (2017) ===
The second-season episodes were written and directed by Henk Handloegten, Achim von Borries, and Tom Tykwer.

No.	Title	Original release date
1	"Episode 9"	10 November 2017
In a forest, a mass grave of 15 bodies is discovered. All the victims were members of the Red Fortress who were shot at the print shop — and Gereon is transferred to Homicide to investigate the execution-style murders. Charlotte provides Gereon with a waybill showing the identifying tag of the railcar suspected of containing the Sorokin gold. The Homicide investigation team identifies the mysterious priest as Saint Joseph Wilczek, who has been found killed. Nyssen is released from prison in time to attend a meeting of the Nyssen AG board of directors, only to discover he has been removed from the board by his mother. Helga and her son Moritz surprise Gereon by arriving in Berlin soon after his brother Anno is officially declared killed in action.
2	"Episode 10"	10 November 2017
Gereon and Helga re-kindle their relationship, but Moritz, her son, does not approve. At the Moka Efti, Charlotte eavesdrops on a meeting between Trokhin, Wendt and Zörgiebel as they discuss rising diplomatic tensions over the impounded Soviet train. Later, Nyssen tells Wendt that there is a large quantity of gold on the train and suggests it could help fund the Black Reichswehr. Greta briefly talks with Fritz as he walks in the funeral procession for the women shot during the 1 May protests. Gereon arrests Soviet embassy attachés Selenski and Fallin after finding ballistic evidence tying the Soviets to the print-shop massacre. Stephan spies on a meeting where Wendt plots with others to seize the train once the police release it. Benda and Gereon confront Trokhin with evidence from the massacre, and Benda offers Trokhin a deal to cover it up in exchange for information on Black Reichswehr personnel responsible for the illegal weapons shipments. Böhm investigates the murder of Saint Josef. Dr. Volcker approaches Gereon about an upcoming civil case against the police department over the 1 May deaths, asking him to testify on behalf of the shooting victims, but Gereon replies that he must remain loyal to the police. Stephan is killed by unknown attackers, his investigation notebook taken.
3	"Episode 11"	17 November 2017
In exchange for releasing Selenski and Fallin, Trokhin provides Gereon evidence that Beck and Seegers have been developing a secret German air force in the Soviet city of Lipetsk. Following a tip from the Armenian, Gereon listens to a radio broadcast by Dr. Schmidt discussing psychiatric treatment. Gereon and Gräf fly to Lipetsk to get photographic evidence of the secret airbase. Gereon relives memories of being chased by Saint Josef before killing him. Benda informs Minister Gustav Stresemann of the investigation into the Black Reichswehr, a group Stresemann is already aware of and whose cause he is sympathetic to.
4	"Episode 12"	17 November 2017
Playing in the former Lux factory, Moritz finds Stephan's body. Homicide detectives question Gereon and Bruno after ballistic evidence shows the same gun killed both Saint Josef and Stephan; later, Gereon and Bruno accuse each other. The tensions between them lead Gereon to move out of Bruno's home to a hotel, taking Helga and Moritz as well. Fritz visits Greta in Benda's house while the family is away. Gereon asks Charlotte to translate the shorthand in Stephan's investigation diary after finding it in Bruno's house. Charlotte is kidnapped by a man she knows as a railyard worker, who appears to be aligned with unknown assailants.
5	"Episode 13"	24 November 2017
Charlotte is brought to the Armenian but, when she cannot answer his questions about the Sorokin gold, is locked in Moka Efti's cold storage room. At the rooming house, Behnke discovers a sheaf of documents, including import authorization forms from the train, underneath the bed in the room where Kardakov — and later Gereon — stayed; she gives the documents to Gereon. Benda convinces the Prussian Court to authorise the arrest of Seegers, Beck and other members of the Black Reichswehr. Bruno shows Moritz how to shoot a rifle after he finds an arms cache in the Wolters' basement storage room. Benda and Gereon interrogate members of the Black Reichswehr. Bruno and the Black Reichswehr set in motion Operation Prangertag, a government coup to install Erich Ludendorff as chancellor and restore former emperor Wilhelm II to power. Greta sees Fritz get shot by police outside the KPD office. Gereon questions Svetlana about the Sorokin gold. After reading a detailed article by Katelbach on the Black Reichswehr, Gereon goes with Katelbach to meet his informant.
6	"Episode 14"	24 November 2017
Katelbach's informant is murdered moments before he is to meet with Gereon. Gereon and Benda start interrogating General Seegers, but are interrupted with orders to release him — and all the other arrested officers, too. Otto tells a grieving Greta that it was Benda's men who killed Fritz, and she says she will do anything to get revenge. As part of Operation Prangertag, Bruno and Scheer attempt to assassinate the visiting German and French foreign ministers, but fail when Gereon intervenes to stop them. President Hindenburg, appearing prior to Benda's press conference, orders the train to be returned to the Soviet Union, and takes General Seegers with him as he leaves. While still captive at Moka Efti, Charlotte, reading the shorthand in Stephan's investigation diary, discovers a plot to hijack the train on its return trip, and passes this information to the Armenian.
7	"Episode 15"	1 December 2017
Gereon and Charlotte inform Benda of the impending train robbery and, against his orders, go off to intercept the train. Greta lets Otto plant a bomb in Benda's home office. Charlotte is shown to drown after the car she is riding in with Gereon is forced off the road by Bruno, into a lake. After arming the bomb, Greta tries to flee Berlin but changes her mind when, at the train station, she is surprised to run into Fritz, remarkably uninjured and now wearing a Sturmabteilung (SA) uniform. Greta runs back to the Bendas' house, but arrives too late to disarm the bomb: it detonates, killing Councillor August Benda and his daughter Margot.
8	"Episode 16"	1 December 2017
Gereon frees the unconscious Charlotte from inside the sunken car and then manages to revive her. Soon they encounter their colleagues; Gräf takes Charlotte for medical care, while Gereon continues on with Henning and Czerwinski to intercept the train. The three manage to board the train shortly before Bruno and the Black Reichswehr commandeer it, but during the hijacking the Black Reichswehr themselves are ambushed by the Armenian's gang. As Gereon confronts Bruno on the train, they discover that the gold bars they find are actually worthless fakes. Henning and Czerwinski incapacitate the Armenian gang with anaesthetic gas, but Bruno manages to escape and gets the train restarted. After fighting with Gereon atop the moving train, Bruno is killed when he accidentally triggers a gas explosion. With Benda's death from the bomb blast, Wendt becomes the new head of the Political Police and asks Gereon to lead, unofficially, a new covert unit investigating internal political crimes and corruption. Charlotte is promoted to deputy homicide detective. Observing a Sorokin family painting in Svetlana's apartment, Gereon and Charlotte deduce that Svetlana is an imposter, and that the gold she spoke of may well be in the tank railcar they searched earlier — but as the material of the cylindrical tank itself, with the fake gold bars a mere diversion. Meanwhile in Paris, Kardakov watches Svetlana sing in a cabaret. In court, Gereon contradicts the testimony of citizens when he confirms under oath Bruno's earlier testimony that it was protesters, not the police, who were doing the shooting during the 1 May demonstrations — thus enraging the communists led by Dr. Volcker, but earning the admiration of his colleagues. Later, he is attacked by a KPD group led by Dr. Volcker, but is rescued by the Armenian and taken to Dr. Schmidt. Under Schmidt's hypnosis, Gereon realises a truth from his past: that during the war he did not attempt to rescue his brother Anno as he lay wounded on the battlefield in no-man's-land, but that he in fact ran away. And further, that the badly scarred Dr. Schmidt is actually Anno himself.

=== Season 3 (2020) ===
No.	Title	Original release date
1	"Episode 17"	24 January 2020
The series opens with Rath at the stock exchange, where share prices have plummeted and employees are committing suicide. We then go back to five weeks earlier — 20 September 1929. Charlotte tries to visit Greta in prison but Greta refuses to see her. Later, Charlotte takes her crime-scene permit exam, but is failed by Ulrich on a technicality, against Gennat's wishes. Upon completing his sentence for tax evasion, Walter Weintraub is fingerprinted and a sample of his hair placed on file — before he is released from prison. On the set of a new sound film, a hooded figure boobytraps a spotlight which later falls, killing the film's star, Betty Winter. The film's producer, Bellman, informs the Armenian, his financier, of the incident. At the film studio Bellman tries, unsuccessfully, to get Rath to declare the death an accident, for insurance purposes. Weintraub, now free, is greeted affectionately at the home of his business partner, Edgar (the Armenian). Nyssen and his mother are reassured that the stock market is booming and she decides to make a large stock purchase. Rath reviews the film footage of Winter's death and notices that moments after the spotlight falls, one actress, Tilly Brooks, appears to be looking away at something. Edgar and Weintraub visit Moka Efti, which is closed due to damage from a water-pipe explosion. Edgar tells Weintraub he thinks the damage to the club and Winter's death were not accidents, but has concealed evidence of the murder as their million-dollar investment in the film is at risk.
2	"Episode 18"	24 January 2020
Greta goes on trial, where Benda's widow passionately testifies against her. Rath, believing Greta played a relatively minor role in the bombing, discovers he cannot access the case files as Wendt has ordered them sealed. The police identify the electrician in charge of the spotlight that killed Winter as Felix Krempin, a former co-worker of an electrician from a different studio who Krempin was impersonating. The death is deemed a murder — a major financial problem for the film's backers, as it means the film company's insurance won't cover any losses due to the disruption. Tilly Brooks tells Rath that when the spotlight fell she saw a ghost-like man in a cloak, and confesses to Charlotte that she overheard Winter arguing with Tristan Rot, her husband and co-star, about going to America. Rath confronts Wendt about accessing the files in Greta's case, but Wendt tells him to focus instead on Hans Litten, a Communist Party lawyer who Wendt says is causing problems for the police (in particular, by demanding that Zörgiebel be put on trial over the deaths from the 1 May protests). Rath shares his suspicions with Charlotte that Wendt is covering up for the Nazis, and they agree to try to help Greta and bring the others behind the bombing to justice. A Nazi party organizer, Stennes, meets with Wendt at his estate and tells him he must handle the threat of Greta's testimony against the Nazis or there will be no more assistance. Rath catches Krempin, who admits to minor sabotage on the film set but denies killing Winter — before he is shot dead by a cloaked figure resembling the one Brooks described.
3	"Episode 19"	31 January 2020
The murderer of Betty Winter is now dubbed "the Phantom" by the press. Sebald locates Greta's child in an orphanage and takes custody of him under Wendt's authority. Wegener, conducting a survey posing as a securities auditor, gathers investment information from various people covering a range of classes, including from Böhm. He finds that nearly all have bought stocks using borrowed money, and Nyssen concludes that a stock market collapse is inevitable. Ulrich finds a ballistics match on the gun belonging to Krempin (the owner's name displayed, "Sandor Gosztony", is momentarily legible in a freeze-frame image). But as he tries to report this to Gereon, he accidentally interrupts Gennat, who angrily rebukes him for violating protocol and the chain of command. Humiliated, Ulrich decides to keep the information to himself out of spite. Weintraub gets rough with the insurance adjuster who has denied Edgar's claim, but to no avail. The recasting of Winter's role begins at the Babelsberg film studio. Rath interrogates Tristan Rot, who admits only to having a shared interest with Krempin in the occult. Rot's costume for the film is found to be a match to the cloak used by the murderer. A seamstress admits that Krempin got her to steal a copy of the costume, but confirms his alibi for Winter's murder. With time and money running short, the casting process is short-circuited and Tilly Brooks is named as Winter's replacement; the other actresses are not given a chance to audition. But Vera, who had also wanted the starring role, then undermines Tilly by locking her in the dressing room. The producers, angered when Tilly fails to show up on the set, replace her with Vera. Soon after, Tilly is killed and Charlotte witnesses a cloaked figure climbing down from a dressing-room window to the courtyard.
4	"Episode 20"	31 January 2020
Greta recants her earlier testimony, now stating that communists, not Nazis, incited her to help plant the bomb. Despite Charlotte's account of what happened at the film studio, Gennat assigns Böhm to lead the investigation, with Rath relegated to a secondary role. In prison, Dr. Völcker attacks Greta in a vain attempt to find out what caused her to change her story and blame communists for her actions. Amongst Krempin's belongings, Rath finds a box of occult items and a secret invitation to an upcoming ceremony at Rot's house. A former neighbour of Charlotte gives her a bundle letters that were sent to her mother, who is now deceased. Among the letters, Charlotte finds a postcard from "E", who she thinks may be her real father. Helga, having left Rath after a falling out, meets with Nyssen, who offers her the use a hotel suite belonging to his family for as long as she wants. Meanwhile, Rath asks Henning to find Helga. At Rath's bidding, Gräf uses his special access to get into the archives and photograph documents from Greta's case. The archive attendant remembers him from the red-light district years earlier and forces him to perform oral sex. Later, Gräf and Rath look at the document photos and notice Katelbach's name on a secret list compiled by the political police. Over drinks, Gräf tells Rath about how he owes his career to Gennat, who, at a low point in his life, pulled him off the street and got him a job as police photographer. He hints at his love for Rath and they dance together drunkenly. Charlotte goes dancing with Vera, an old friend from Moka Efti. She encourages Charlotte to go find "E", and then comes onto her. They go home together, to the apartment Charlotte now shares with her sister Toni.
5	"Episode 21"	7 February 2020
Rath, Böhm and Charlotte attend the secret gathering at Tristan Rot's house. Masked and cloaked, they watch as Dr. Schmidt summons Betty Winter's spirit in a seance — before Böhm breaks up the ceremony with a gunshot and arrests Rot. Dr. Schmidt scurries off, and when he sees Rath (who calls him "Anno"), gives him a hypnotic command to forget he saw him at the house. Rath meets with Katelbach and admits he was toeing the company line when he testified in the Zörgiebel case. Rath shows Katelbach the secret list, pointing out his name on it and warning him that he may be at risk. In turn, Katelbach mentions that Litten's name is on the list, too. He also tells Rath about an article he's recently completed, proving that Lufthansa is illegally working with the Reichswehr, and warns Rath not to trust anybody. In a police interrogation, Rot claims the reason he went to the courtyard was to reconnect with Winter's soul. Edgar and Weintraub meet with rival gangs and accuse them of trying to sabotage their operation, which they deny. Böhm gives Charlotte a menial assignment, but Rath tells her to investigate the secret list instead. A Nazi agitator named Horst Kessler, whose name is also on the list, hires a sex worker named Erna for the night, with plans to rescue her from her pimp, Ali. In court, Greta is sentenced to death and refuses to appeal. Some express surprise at the sentence, saying life imprisonment would have been more appropriate and noting that the court's decision makes no mention of mitigating circumstances, such as Greta's confession. Rath finds out that Helga is staying at the hotel and, when he goes to her room, sees flowers and a note sent from 'A', but finds only Moritz there. In the prison, Dr. Völcker arranges to be assigned as Greta's new cellmate.
6	"Episode 22"	7 February 2020
Wendt's henchmen, including Kessler, raid the offices of Tempo and beat up Heymann, its editor; Katelbach flees the building with his documents. General Seegers' daughter, Marie-Luise (MaLu), who is a law student and volunteers in Litten's office, reluctantly agrees to her father's request that she attend Frau Nyssen's party with him and her sister. Helga refuses to let Moritz attend a Nazi Youth outing. Two names on the secret list, NSDAP members Richard Pechtmann and Horst Kessler, stand out by the initials written next to them. Rath discovers that they are actual names of Fritz Höckert and Otto Wollenberg. At Charlotte's request, Litten agrees to take Greta's case pro bono and Charlotte, in return, offers to help out at his office. Kessler and Pechtmann enter Elisabeth's boarding house looking for Katelbach, but she helps him hide. Later, she delivers his documents to Heymann, after losing Pechtmann when he tries to follow her. Helga finds out that she's pregnant. Rath, pretending to be a Nazi, breaks into Kessler's boarding rooms and finds Erna, who tells him Kessler is at a Hitler Youth camp. At the Nyssen soirée, MaLu discusses politics with Wendt. Later in a meeting, Wendt proposes having the Nazis create civil unrest to further the conservatives' plans; General Seegers disagrees. Stresemann suddenly walks into the room and asserts that the monarchists and the military should work together. Moritz asks to move in with Rath and gives him a letter from Helga asking Rath to let her go. Weintraub denies Esther, Edgar's wife, the lead role in the film. Charlotte confronts Vera about her relationship with Weintraub and Vera admits that he ordered her to lie that they were together when Winter was murdered.
7	"Episode 23"	14 February 2020
Unable to find Rath, Charlotte goes to Czerwinski and Henning, asking them to put surveillance on Weintraub, but not to tell Böhm. Litten enters an appeal for Greta, after which the judge involved telephones Wendt. Rath tracks down Pechtmann and brings him in for Greta to identify formally, but she denies knowing him, so Rath has to let him go. Ullrich, going over Tilly's possessions, finds within a locket a hair belonging to Weintraub, thus pointing to him as the murderer. Nyssen describes to General Seeger's group how the manipulation of over-extended small investors is about to cause the economy to collapse. He suggests that by short-selling massive amounts of stock, they could earn billions, creating an opportunity to change society radically. Wendt seems intrigued, but the others only scoff. Czerwinski and Henning follow Weintraub to Babelsberg studio and observe him ordering his men to protect Vera. Rath and Charlotte arrive at the studio as well, but the Phantom attacks Vera, after first killing her guard. She manages to wound him and escapes from the room. Rath intervenes but is also injured and the Phantom runs off. A disoriented Vera appears on a catwalk high above the soundstage. Charlotte climbs up to her, but the Phantom appears, seizes her from behind and throws her off the catwalk. Charlotte barely survives the fall by grabbing onto a chain attached to a pulley, leaving her suspended above the floor. The Phantom then carries Vera to the building's roof. Moments later, Charlotte and the others see the Phantom and Vera plunge together from the roof. The fall leaves Vera dead and the Phantom injured and unconscious. The Phantom's mask comes off, revealing Weintraub.
8	"Episode 24"	14 February 2020
Pechtmann meets with Wendt to blackmail him, but instead is killed by him. A seriously injured Weintraub lies in the Charité hospital, where Rath is also being treated. Gennat publicly announces that the murderer has been caught, but does not disclose his identity. Esther tries to convince her husband, Edgar, that Weintraub cannot be the murderer, showing him how Weintraub made certain that it was he, not Edgar, who served the time in prison. Helga visits Rath in hospital to tell him about her pregnancy, but he confronts her with questions about the identity of "A." and whether he really is the father, leaving her upset. Moritz goes on a hunting trip with the Hitler Youth and swears allegiance to Hitler. The prison warden notifies Litten that Greta's execution is set to take place in just five days, even though the appeal Litten filed for her has not yet been processed. Later, the warden is confused when Greta denies that Litten is her lawyer. Greta confides to cellmate Dr. Völcker that she lied in her courtroom testimony, doing so because of threats to her child. Katelbach's article revealing the Reichswehr-Lufthansa illegal arms deal is published, causing him to be charged with treason. Wendt calls Nyssen, offering to persuade General Seegers' group to invest in the short-selling scheme if Nyssen invests 100 million Marks in the scheme as well, using his mother's money. During a power cut, Edgar visits Rath in hospital, seeking confirmation that Weintraub is guilty of the Phantom's murders. Rath later finds that Weintraub has been taken from his hospital bed. Elsewhere, Dr. Schmidt revives the relocated Weintraub with ECT. Weintraub then tells Edgar that the real Phantom pushed Vera and him off the roof, and admits to his love of Edgar's wife, Esther. Helga arranges for an abortion, which is illegal. Charlotte performs in a sex show to earn money for her sister Ilse's eye surgery. Edgar confronts Esther, accusing her of having an affair with Weintraub — as the police arrive to search their house.
9	"Episode 25"	21 February 2020
Esther has the idea of the film's plot changing so that the main character is a 'man-machine', so that she can play her, thereby completing the film's shoot; she also helps Weintraub hide and recover at the studio. Police interrogate Edgar while conducting a city-wide search for Weintraub. Charlotte takes Ilse to meet the eye doctor; the surgery appears to be successful and Ilse is told to remove the bandages in three days. Horst pays Ali to release Erna but Stennes tells Horst to get rid of her and move address. Wendt questions Rath about Katelbach and gets a warrant to search Elisabeth's place, but comes up empty; Rath has ensured that he appears to be genuinely trying to find Katelbach to avoid Wendt's suspicions, but in fact he is hiding him in his own flat. Nyssen forges a document to obtain power of attorney from his mother and enters into a three-month short futures contract with the bank. Rath talks to Helga about Moritz, who wants to stay with him, and gets into a fight with Nyssen, who he suspects is "A.", over her. Litten takes on Katelbach's treason charge and without Litten's knowledge, Malu offers to provide secret Reichswehr plans to Elisabeth for Katelbach's case. At Gräf's birthday party, Charlotte and Rath admit their attraction for one another and kiss. Ali is confronted by Wendt's henchman, who gives him a gun and pays him to kill Horst.
10	"Episode 26"	21 February 2020
The homicide department brings in Dr. Schmidt to conduct a psychic reading to find Weintraub. At her suggestion, a follow-up inspection on the roof of the film studios is carried out and Rath finds a bloody knife, identical to the one already found where Weintraub and Vera fell. Edgar is released from jail and makes peace with Esther, and accepts that she will complete the film. He discover's Weintraub's hiding place and tells him that, once he has recovered, he must leave his house and never have anything to do with Esther and himself again. Charlotte convinces Greta to accept Litten's representation. Nyssen's mother is furious when he tells her of the current 11 million Reichsmark loss on the 106 million Reichsmarks futures position and threatens to have him declared mentally incompetent. Ali goes to kill Horst at his apartment during a Hitler Youth meeting, and shoots him dead as Moritz and his friend knock at the door; Ali goes to shoot Erna as well but is out of bullets and he runs off; Rath is watching the address from the street and runs over when Moritz appears but Ali gets away. Charlotte asks Cziczewicz about Toni's whereabouts and stumbles across Helga's illegal abortion. Malu photographs documents at night in the Reichswehr Ministry, as promised to Elisabeth. Ulrich plants Weintraub's fingerprints on the newly discovered knife.
11	"Episode 27"	28 February 2020
In a flashback to two weeks earlier, Ullrich approaches Gosztony at his beverage store with evidence that ties him to the Krempin murder. He blackmails Bela and Sandor Gosztony, who have previous convictions, to continue killing those associated with the film in the manner of the Betty Winter murder he knows Sandor committed when Krempin refused, using the Phantom costume which he knows will attract press attention. Back in the present, Ulrich shows Rath that Weintraub's fingerprints are on the knife that was discovered, but Charlotte is not convinced as the attacker wore gloves. Wendt is given Benda's diary by his widow; it proves that Zörgiebel ordered the police to start shooting during the Blutmai riots, and Wendt confronts Zörgiebel with the diary to try to get him to resign. Nyssen attempts suicide, but is saved by Helga who having found a suicide note in her room rushes to Alfred's home. Ilse's husband confronts Charlotte at work over Ilse's surgery which has made her almost blind, believing she made an appointment with an incompetent physician. Gereon and Zörgiebel suspect Wendt arranged Benda's murder and then covered up all the evidence, ensuring all those involved are killed, but lack enough evidence to act. Malu gives photographic evidence of plans by the Reichswehr to illegally rearm to Elisabeth, who forwards it to Katelbach and Rath. Charlotte inspects Weintraub's fingerprints and points out the suspected forgery to Ulrich, who knocks her unconscious. Ulrich kills Weißhaupt, his assistant, then gives her a potentially lethal insulin injection. Ulrich also injects Rath, who has come to police HQ with Graf to develop the film, but Rath shoots and wounds Ulrich. Gennat, who is sleeping in the office, is taken hostage by Ulrich, who conducts a lecture in the auditorium to an imaginary press corps. In the 'lecture' Ulrich reveals that the Gosztony brothers wanted to bankrupt the film production as revenge against Edgar for cutting out Sandor's tongue and feeding it to his brother, and that Ulrich conspired to falsify the police evidence and frame Weintraub. Rath saves himself by finding sugar cubes and eating them, then finds Charlotte alive. He confronts Ulrich in the lecture hall, and police save Gennat and Ulrich is arrested before he can shoot himself.
12	"Episode 28"	28 February 2020
Whilst having a meeting with Wendt, Stresemann has a heart attack, and Wendt ignores Stresemann's pleas for help until he is sure he is dead. Edgar and Weintraub kill Sandor while he is in police custody, after bribing some officers. Litten obtains a stay of execution for Greta on the day of Stresemann's funeral, and the judge informs Wendt, who proceeds to the prison to prevent the warden finding out about the stay. Charlotte tries to prevent Greta's execution but is prevented from delivering the stay by prison guards following Wendt's orders and Greta is beheaded. Toni, blaming Charlotte for their sister's blindness, leaves home and leaves a note for Charlotte telling her not to try to find her. Rath, who is wearing a wire, goes to the Hoppegarten racetrack and gets Wendt to admit to orchestrating the Benda murder, expediting Greta's execution as a cover-up, and arranging for the deaths of Pechtman and Horst, while Gräf secretly records the conversation. Zörgiebel resigns and Albert Grzesinski appoints himself Chief of Police, much to Wendt's frustration. The film (Dämonen der Leidenschaft) is finally finished and has a successful premiere, but a bad review by Jacobi (who has now become Gräf's lover) in Tempo. As Nyssen predicted, Wall Street collapses and throws the Berlin Stock Exchange into chaos. At the stock exchange, Böhm, who had borrowed heavily in the stock market, is talked out of suicide by Rath. The final scene, as Rath leaves the stock exchange, mirrors the first scene of the series' first episode.

=== Season 4 (2022) ===
No.	Title	Original release date
1	"Episode 29"	8 October 2022
It is New Years' Eve, 31 December 1930, and the Great Depression has hit Berlin with full force. Gereon attends a meeting of the SA led by the headstrong Oberführer Walter Stennes, who ignores orders from Nazi leadership to abstain from any street fighting, and leads his brownshirts in an attack on Jewish businesses on the Kurfürstendamm. Nearby, Gereon's nephew Moritz and several friends prepare a Judenboykott banner drop on the roof of the Tietz department store, which Charlotte's runaway sister Toni and her boyfriend, Benni, are coincidentally simultaneously burgling. Police from the local precinct, Section 14, arrive and chase the couple to the roof. Moritz helps Toni hide as an officer, Kuschke, pushes Benni to his death. Charlotte is sent to photograph the crime scene; spotting Toni in a crowd of onlookers, she chases after her, only to run into Gereon, whom Charlotte is surprised to see wearing an SA uniform. Meanwhile, Alfred Nyssen throws a New Year's Eve party, where, to his mother's distress, he presents Helga Rath with a family heirloom – a diamond called the Blue Rothschild – and announces their elopement. Nyssen also announces his company's intention to start building rockets, which he hopes will one day bring Germans to the moon. Upon seeing the Blue Rothschild, Jewish businessman Jacob Grün makes a distressed call to his nephew, Abe Gold, in Brooklyn, as Frau Nyssen's manservant Wegener eavesdrops. After the party, Colonel Wendt and Marie-Luise Seegers spend the night together.
2	"Episode 30"	8 October 2022
Toni cuts her hair in a public bathroom. Now together, Walter Weintraub and Esther Kasabian visit the grave of her late husband Edgar, "the Armenian," who died the year prior. The body of Friedhelm Oelschläger, a civil official, is found in a park with his throat cut; papers found on his body indicate that he was working with Ringvereine gambling operations across Berlin masquerading as legitimate non-profits. Wendt arrives at the police lockup to secure the release of several brownshirts, including Gereon, but leaves the disobedient Stennes imprisoned. Charlotte confronts Gereon, who forcefully defends his membership in the SA. Gereon later privately reports his successful infiltration of the organization to Chief Grzesinski. A coat belonging to Toni is recovered from the Tietz crime scene and brought to Charlotte; she covertly stashes it in her desk and replaces it with another, but is seen doing so by Böhm. Toni is arrested trying to pawn jewelry from the burglary. She is brought in for questioning and Charlotte slips her the key to her holding cell, aiding her escape. When the Homicide Department meet to debrief the Tietz burglary and Oelschläger murder, Charlotte reveals that Gereon has joined the SA, and Böhm exposes Charlotte's role in covering up her sister's crimes. Gennat dismisses Charlotte from the Criminal Investigations Department.
3	"Episode 31"	15 October 2022
Businessman Abe Gold flies from New York to Berlin, determined to retrieve the Blue Rothschild. Gereon questions Weintraub about the Oelschläger murder; Weintraub reveals that the official was helping the Ringvereine across Berlin to secure gaming and club licenses, and that few benefit from his demise. Gereon meets with Stennes in prison and informs him that Hitler has personally ordered Stennes removed from his party leadership position in Berlin for disobeying orders on the night of the Kurfürstendamm attack; Stennes intimates that there is evidence that Wendt is gay and entreats Gereon to find it. Arndt, one of Moritz's friends from the Tietz rooftop, sees Wendt riding by a gay cruising site in a park and recognizes him. Toni goes to hide out with her friend Renate, only to find that Renate's mother, family friend Frau Cziczewicz, has died, and her children are living together unsupervised. Toni cases Behnke's home for a robbery. Charlotte participates in a days-long dance marathon at Moka Efti, with a prize of 1000 marks. On the first night, Gräf joins her and provides her with moral support after her sacking from homicide. Gereon visits Dr. Schmidt's laboratory to find him performing tests of the methamphetamine Pervitin on animals; Dr. Schmidt tells Gereon he is preparing to test it on humans.
4	"Episode 32"	15 October 2022
Benni's killer Kuschke takes part in a meeting of the White Hand, a secret society carrying out extrajudicial killings of criminals and the poor. As Abe Gold arrives in Berlin on the Graf Zeppelin, MaLu Seegers is reunited with her lover Oskar Kulanin, a Russian spy who was also on the airship. On the second day of the dance marathon, Charlotte is joined by her lover Rudi, a police coroner. He tells her his autopsy revealed that Benni was pushed from the roof, but the coroner buried the evidence. Arndt attempts to blackmail Wendt, but Wendt sees through him and Arndt expresses his relief, because he admires Wendt and was only acting under orders from Stennes. At Wendt's urging, Nyssen pivots his rocket-building enterprise towards producing missiles. Gereon meets with Katelbach and Litten, who are preparing to face trial for exposing the workings of the Black Reichswehr. Their associate Heynmann surmises that Oelschläger was killed in preparation for the fixing of a boxing match run by Weintraub; his suspicions are borne out when an unknown man coerces the fighters to stage a dive for a massive payout. Officer Naumann, a colleague of Kuschke's from Section 14 catches Toni and prepares to execute her, but she is saved when Moritz stabs the officer in the back. Arndt tells the police that Toni killed Naumann. Gereon interrupts the dance marathon to tell Charlotte that the police are searching for her sister. They go to Frau Cziczewicz's, where Renate lies and says Toni is not there. Charlotte faints from exhaustion and Gereon takes her home.
5	"Episode 33"	22 October 2022
Abe Gold breaks into Nyssen's castle and forces him to open the safe containing the Blue Rothschild, only to find it missing. Gold kidnaps Helga and vows to hold her hostage until the gem is found. Katelbach's trial begins, but ends just as quickly, after the judges receive a mysterious message from high-ranking officials. Without allowing the defense to present witnesses or evidence, they seal the trial to the public and the media and summarily sentence Katelbach and Heynmann to 18 months in prison for treason and defamation. Before he is spirited off to jail, Katelbach proposes to Frau Behnke. While she is at the trial, Toni's friend burglarizes Behnke's boarding house, inadvertently stealing a set of negatives capable of proving Katelbach's innocence. The winning betting slips for Weintraub's boxing match go unredeemed by the fight's fixer, but a fellow crime boss, Red Hugo, is found dead in Weintraub's boxing gym with the slips nailed to his body. Max Fuchs, an underling of Weintraub with connections to the mysterious fixer, begins making moves to take over Weintraub's operation. Gereon and Charlotte reconcile after he confides in her that he was placed in the SA as part of a secret plan by Chief Grzesinski in hopes of eventually criminalizing the NSDAP. Arndt confesses to Moritz that he lied and told the police that Toni killed Naumann because he is in love with Moritz and wanted to protect him. Charlotte and Rudi confide in Gereon that higher-ups in the police department are attempting to cover up Benni's murder. Charlotte and Gereon discover that Kuschke's precinct, Section 14, has been murdering vagrants and criminals and staging the killings to appear accidental. Walking to Gereon's flat after work with the evidence, Rudi is stabbed by officer Kuschke.
6	"Episode 34"	22 October 2022
Dr. Völcker is sprung from a prison work camp with the help of Kulanin. The two of them confide in MaLu their plan to kill Wendt. Moritz confesses to the killing of officer Naumann and is jailed. The officers of Section 14 are called in for questioning; all pin the suspicious death of Benni on the recently deceased Naumann. Charlotte visits Litten to apply for work, and learns that all victims of Section 14 were sentenced by the same judge, Ferdinand Voss. She visits Voss' court, and under the pretense that she is still a detective, gains access to his files. Unbeknownst to Charlotte, Voss is in fact the leader of the White Hand, an extra-legal vigilante court. Toni and her siblings are visited by child services and sent to the Sonnenborn youth home. Helga tells Gold that Frau Nyssen is most likely to know the location of the Blue Rothschild, so he kidnaps the matriarch as well, imprisoning her with her daughter-in-law. Weintraub and Esther are narrowly saved from assassination when their bodyguard opens a car door and detonates a bomb hidden within. Gereon visits Moritz in remand, and returns home to find Charlotte there. The two make love.
7	"Episode 35"	29 October 2022
Wendt comes into possession of Katelbach's negatives and burns them. Gereon has a nightmare about Dr. Schmidt testing the Pervitin on him, causing him to kill another man in a fight. Weintraub confesses to Esther that he had the Armenian assassinated after the Armenian tried to kill him first; Esther leaves him. A series of gang-related killings sweeps Berlin, and the police receive a crate containing the corpse of Red Hugo. Gereon tracks the crate to an abandoned warehouse where he finds the body of another crime lord, Rat-Robert, and a living Edgar Kasabian, who has been orchestrating the chaos in Berlin's underworld. The Armenian asks Gereon to broker a peace conference meeting between the leaders of Berlin's Ringvereine. If Gereon does this, the Armenian promises to kill Dr. Schmidt and set Gereon free of his control. Nyssen asks Jacob Grün to make a copy of the Blue Rothschild, so he can trade it for the freedom of Helga and his mother, but Grün says it would be impossible to reproduce the gem. Gold and Jacob Grün attempt to meet at a dining club to discuss his kidnapping the women for the Blue Rothschild; they are denied entry as Jews. A desperate Nyssen meets with Dr. Schmidt, who convinces him to give up on Helga and his mother, and enjoy his freedom from them. Charlotte inquires with the mothers of children killed by Section 14. She finds that most had been sentenced to Sonnenborn and were autopsied by Dr. Schwarz, Rudi's supervisor at the police morgue. Charlotte calls Sonnenborn, only to discover that the matron, Helene, is Judge Voss' wife. Nyssen tells his servant Wegener he has no intention of trying to get Helga and his mother back. Outraged at this decision, Wegener retreats to his room, where it's revealed that he stole the Blue Rothschild.
8	"Episode 36"	29 October 2022
Aided by Charlotte and Gereon, Litten, MaLu, and Behnke are able to obtain a first-hand document proving that the Black Reichswehr is re-arming. Gräf takes photos of Wendt having sex with Arndt in the gay cruising site in the park, and Gereon blackmails Wendt to secure Stennes' release. At the Moka Efti, Stennes and Gereon instigate a brawl between Stennes' SA loyalists and members of the SS. Gereon arranges for the bosses of the Ringvereine to meet under his protection. Wegener promises to return the Blue Rothschild to Gold. Gold reconnects with his extended family for Shabbat dinner, where Grün insists that his meeting with Wegener is likely a trap. Gold misses their appointed rendezvous. Charlotte sneaks into police headquarters at night and discovers Rudi's body on the coroner's slab; seeing Kuschke and others from Section 14 loading Dr. Schwarz into a truck, she jumps on the back.
9	"Episode 37"	5 November 2022
Kulanin demands the Reichswehr document from MaLu for Soviet intelligence; MaLu refuses, and Kulanin takes it from her by force. The truck brings Charlotte to Sonnenberg, where the White Hand performs show trials and executions. There, she runs into her sister Toni and Renate; Renate escapes and calls Gereon for backup, while Kuschke finds and attacks Toni and Charlotte, who kills Kuschke and barricades the White Hand members in their courtroom until the police arrive to arrest them all. Helga escapes from Gold's makeshift prison on the barge, choosing to leave Frau Nyssen behind. When Gold returns, Nyssen tells him that the Blue Rothschild that Gold is looking for is a forgery, that the original was lost on a shipwreck in Odessa in 1915, which also killed his father, and her husband, who was smuggling the gem into Germany for him. Seeing through her lie, Gold leaves her to die on the sinking barge. Weintraub repossesses Esther's share in the Moka Efti and sells it without her consent. Moving ahead without Kulanin, Völcker orders MaLu to bring Wendt to her father's hunting cabin, so Völcker can shoot him.
10	"Episode 38"	5 November 2022
MaLu brings Wendt to the site of his assassination, but steps in front of Völcker's bullet at the last second; Wendt carries her to safety. Wegener looks to fence the Blue Rothschild, but finds that no one will sell or buy it. Esther looks for work after Weintraub's sale of Moka Efti, and is offered a chance overseas in Hollywood. Böhm, whose salary is being confiscated by his bank, contemplates suicide on a bridge. A man approaches him promising to make all of his financial problems disappear. Gereon and Gräf oversee the unarmed sitdown between the Ringvereine in their own homicide department offices at police headquarters. Unbeknownst to them, Böhm helped smuggle the Armenian into the walls of their office with a tommy gun. Fuchs locks the door to prevent any escapes before the Armenian emerges and kills all assembled, including Weintraub and Fuchs. The Armenian stages the scene of the crime to look as if the crime lords turned on one another and leaves before a bewildered Gereon breaks down the door.
11	"Episode 39"	12 November 2022
Under the impression that it was his intention, the press and his fellow officers laud Gereon as a hero for arranging the deaths of Berlin's criminal element. Nyssen and Helga learn that Frau Nyssen's will requires the burial of her body. They search the wreck of the barge, but find no body. Without it, they cannot inherit her fortune for ten years. Wendt questions MaLu about his would-be assassin; she names Kulanin rather than Völcker. Wendt warns General Seegers that his daughter may be punished for treason, and they determine that Kulanin likely sought information on Nyssen's rocket program. Wegener approaches Grün, asking him to set up a meeting with Gold. There, Wegener confesses that Frau Nyssen stole the gem in Odessa in 1915 and then had him sink the ship carrying Gold's father and Herr Nyssen, a bon vivant whose business incompetence endangered their fortune. He returns the Blue Rothschild to Gold. Esther visits her husband's grave before preparing to leave for Hollywood; he appears and castigates her for being with Weintraub after his supposed death, then leaves her, vowing to take their children. Gereon and Stennes make plans to seize leadership of the Nazi party, but Moritz, released from jail, later overhears Gereon and Grzesinski discussing their plan to outlaw the party. Moritz realizes Rath is a double agent within the NSDAP and informs on him to Stennes.
12	"Episode 40"	12 November 2022
The Stennes revolt commences with the seizure of Berlin's Nazi party headquarters. Forewarned of Gereon's infiltration by Moritz, Stennes demands that Gereon execute a party official who attempts to call Wendt. Gereon refuses, and is imprisoned, though Moritz has a change of heart and helps his uncle fight off his captors to escape. Wendt mobilizes a company of SS troops, armed with guns supplied by the police, and they regain control of the building. Nyssen and Helga hold a funeral for his mother. Gold gives the Blue Rothschild to Jacob Grün, for the use of the Berlin Jewish community. Disillusioned with life in Berlin and bonded by shared trauma, Moritz and Toni run away together, hitchhiking westwards. Preparing to leave Berlin on the Graf Zeppelin, Kulanin is detained on behalf of Wendt. Wendt arrives to interrogate Kulanin, only to find that he has diplomatic immunity from the United States. Kulanin, Gold, and Esther depart for New York, along with MaLu, who has stowed away. MaLu steals the Reichswehr documents and drops them via parachute to Völcker, who plans to bring them to Moscow. Charlotte is reunited with her long-lost half-brother, Johann "Rukeli" Trollmann, a half-Sinti boxer, and attends a title fight with Rath. Despite the jeers of a brigade of SA men in the crowd, Trollman beats his local Berliner opponent. Alongside Gräf, Gräf's lover Jacoby, and Trollman, Charlotte and Gereon celebrate, and Lotte is reinstated to the Berlin homicide department. The Armenian fulfills his half of the bargain with Rath, and goes with him to kill Dr. Schmidt, but at the last minute, Gereon insists on going into the clinic alone. Gereon tells Dr. Schmidt that he no longer wants him dead, because he no longer fears him. Dr. Schmidt is pleased by this and reveals that he has been assembling an army of patients, cryptically telling Gereon that he is now "ready to lead them."

=== Season 5 (2026) ===
No.	Title	Original release date
1	"Episode 41"	10 September 2026
In 1918, at the Pasewalk Reserve Hospital in northeastern Germany, Dr. Edmund Forster uses suggestive therapy to cure his patient Adolf Hitler's hysterical blindness. In 1933, Fred Jacoby announces that Hitler has been appointed Reichskanzler by Paul von Hindenburg. Meanwhile, Gräf arrives at Dr. Forster's office for an appointment, only to find him in shock, his office ransacked, and his receptionist garroted. After Dr. Forster flees, Gräf tears his page out of Dr. Forster's diary and puts in an anonymous call, while the SA responsible reports to Göring. Ritter arrives to investigate the scene, with Dr. Forster wanted for murder. Paranoia sweeps across Germany. Katelbach, Heymann, and Litten attend Hitler's inauguration, with the latter followed by an SA member. Only by threatening a police officer is Littenn able to get assistance. In the meantime, Rath retrieves explosives from a farmhouse and fails to deliver them to an SA man named Paul Strelow. He returns with the explosives to his apartment, where he and Ritter prepare for the press ball. At the press ball, Dr. Forster attempts to meet with Dr. Schmidt to receive help and Heymann to publish his story. When SA members pursue Forster, Rath flees with Dr. Forster and Dr. Schmidt, leaving Gräf and Ritter stunned. That same evening, Nyssen plans a dinner with Nazi Party officials, only to retreat to his room when Hitler fails to arrive. Göring plans to establish a secret police, suppress the Communists, and rig the upcoming elections, troubling Wegener and delighting Helga.
2	"Episode 42"	10 September 2026
Strelow is lured into an alley and stabbed to death by SA members. A police officer who witnesses the crime is garroted. Without Rath, the murder squad reviews the Dr. Forster case, and Böhm presses for the recent murders to be investigated as well. Afterwards, the Prussian Police are subordinated to the Nazi Party, with 5,000 SA members deputised as Hilfspolizei. Wendt becomes the head of the secret police but refuses to salute Adolf Hitler. At lunch, Katelbach buys Heymann a cake, inspiring Litten to propose an anti-fascist united front between the Communists and the Social Democrats, which would give them the ability to rival the Nazis. On his way out, Heymann is kidnapped and imprisoned in a makeshift concentration camp. Hitler makes his first radio address to the German people. Returning home, Ritter finds the explosives intended for Strelow. Having met him the prior day, she digs deeper, discovering that Dr. Forster was Hitler's doctor and that Hitler was a hysteric, which would be a damning story if published. Meanwhile, Gräf visits the Institut für Sexualwissenschaft. A transvestite, Gräf is unable to transition without either Dr. Hirschfield or Dr. Forster. He performs at a gay club with Ritter and his boyfriend Jacoby, only to be harassed by police. Dr. Schmidt meets with the Armenian underground.
3	"Episode 43"	10 September 2026
In 1918, Dr. Forster reviews his patients at the Pasewalk Reserve Hospital. They include Franz Krajewski, Anno Rath (Dr. Schmidt), Adolf Hitler, Edgar Kasabian (the Armenian), and Karl Wosniak. Dr. Forster arranges to treat each one. In 1933, Krajewski is drug-addicted and homeless. Passed by the SA man responsible for murdering both Dr. Forster's receptionist and Strelow, he finds Wosniak stabbed to death. Böhm, homeless and apparently divorced, is offered a drink by Marinus van der Lubbe at the shelter. Wendt learns that the Strelow case has been taken by Homicide and rushes to confront Böhm, who is informed by Krajewski that veterans from Pasewalk are being systematically murdered. When Böhm meets with Wendt and is taken off the case, Krajewski is kidnapped. Ritter discovers that the medical records of Hitler were immediately borrowed on the day of his release from prison, 20 November 1924, and that they have never been returned. At lunch with Ritter, Gräf elaborates that he had an appointment with Dr. Forster to transition. Later, she calls Rath's father, who claims that he has not heard from his son. Böhm meets with her and connects the Forster and Strelow cases. At Strelow's mother's residence, Ritter discovers an arms cache where Rath got the explosives. Litten and Katelbach attempt to unify the Communists and Social Democrats behind anti-fascism. They remain unwilling to work with one another. Meanwhile, Van der Lubbe is thrown out of KPD headquarters for suggesting that the party bomb the Reichstag. Ritter is shown footage of Strelow, Krajewski, and Rath in institutional care, suggesting he will be the next to be murdered. When she arrives at the institute, she sees Dr. Schmidt.
4	"Episode 44"	10 September 2026
In 1918, Dr. Forster uses suggestive therapy to cure Anno Rath. Anno Rath agrees to serve Dr. Forster until he fully recovers. The staff and patients learn of the Armistice of 11 November 1918 and the German Revolution, leading Hitler to break down. Later, Anno Rath describes a Nazi acid attack upon him in 1924. Having faked his death, he took up the name Dr. Schmidt. On the evening of 30 January 1933, Dr. Forster escapes the SA with Dr. Schmidt and Rath. Rath secures transit on a train to Paris, but the SA arrange for them to be arrested on the way there. First, the Thuringian Police stop the train; second, the SA search it as it stops in Cologne. Dr. Forster and Rath escape only because the Cologne police arrest them. At Rath's father's insistence, Konrad Adenauer flies them to Paris. There, Ernst Weiss takes Dr. Forster to write his story. After they leave, Rath is kidnapped by German diplomatic staff.
5	"Episode 45"	10 September 2026
After Böhm leaves Rath and Ritter's apartment, she finds that he has taken the explosives. Böhm and Gräf discover the corpse of Krajewski dumped in a river. Meanwhile, Blank meets with Wendt to discuss the capture of Rath. Wendt then meets with Gennat. Having listened in, Ritter is now aware of Rath's fate. Heymann is transferred to a new cell in the concentration camp. He finds Rath, badly beaten. The two discuss plans to escape during a prisoner transfer. Max and Brock, two communists interned with them, join the plan. Behnke masquerades as a sister of Rosa Luxemburg, bringing ideas of a popular front to Socialist Rosa Helfers and Communist Dr. Völcker. Böhm and Ritter meet, with both now aware that Hitler is having every patient of Pasewalk killed. Böhm throws the explosives into the Landwehr Canal. Across the water, 200,000 Socialists have turned out to protest Nazism. Van der Lubbe uses the demonstration as cover to burn the Reichstag down. Though he fails, Wendt decides to use him to launch a false-flag attack to suspend the Constitution. Böhm returns to police headquarters to find Krajewski's body cremated and his service records stolen. He is forcefully placed under Wendt.
6	"Episode 46"	10 September 2026
Behnke invites Helfers and Dr. Völcker at her flat, but is revealed as an imposter. The two nevertheless accept to negotiate an alliance between the SPD and KPD, and bring top party officials to Behnke's flat in Litten and Katelbach's presence. While leaving to go buy some groceries, Katelbach is followed and taken to the SA barracks by SA men. At Liebenberg Castle, Nyssen eagerly anticipates his meeting with Hitler. As he rehearses his reception, he hallucinates his soaked mother. Gereon is interrogated and released by Wendt, but must continue to fear for his life. Right before his eyes, the prisoners begin to be transported from the SA prison to the camp. Among them are Heymann and Katelbach, who are preparing to escape during their transfer. They are taken into Henning and Czerwinski's truck with two SA guards, while Gereon follows them to alert the drivers. The escapees' plan succeeds, but in the ensuing brawl, Katelbach collapses and dies. Heymann and Gereon drive to Behnke to announce the news. Returning home, Gereon is met by two SA men part of the assassination squad, but manages to fight and kill them both. He meets a furious Charlotte, with whom he reconciles.
7	"Episode 47"	10 September 2026
It is 27 February 1933. The Nyssens prepare a dinner with Hitler and high members of the NSDAP. Gereon, Anno, Wegener, and the Armenian are carrying out a risky plan for the Nyssens' dinner with Hitler at Liebenberg Castle. Together they prepare to infiltrate the dinner and set up explosives under the table right at Hitler's seat. Gereon also plans to broadcast the news of Hitler's death on the radio thanks to Jacoby. He reveals the plan to Charlotte, who refuses to join in on the plan, and the two break up. At the same time, the SPD and KPD agree to hold a meeting at the Reichstag against the NSDAP ahead of the March 5 elections. Wendt and Sebald decide to set up a plan against this meeting, and use van der Lubbe to set up a false-flag attack on the Reichstag. Armed with an SA ID card, he gets past the guards. Charlotte travels to Wannsee to meet up with Dr. Dresse to learn more about Hitler's file. Böhm finds her name as well as Gereon's on a list of political enemies. He drives to Wannsee to intercept Charlotte and warn her: under no circumstances should she and Gereon return to their apartment. He also suggests that she tells him to back off the plan. At the Tempo editorial office, Heymann discloses the camps that the SA is setting up. Half of the team decide to resign in fear of repercussions, while the rest plan to publish Katelbach's obituary and a list of detainees. and Heymann receives a call from Charlotte, who tells him that former chancellor von Schleicher owns the file. He travels to his house to convince him to release the file to the public, which he refuses to do. That night, as Charlotte asks Gräf and Jacoby about Gereon's whereabouts, at Liebenberg Castle the plan is set in motion. Gereon, the Armenian, and Wegener manage to plant and fuse the bomb just before the first guests arrive. Unfortunately, Alfred arranges the seats at the last moment. Hitler, whose seat is now at the edge of the table, is out of reach of the bomb.
8	"Episode 48"	10 September 2026
Just before the first guests can enter, the Armenian and Wegener adjust the bomb to be placed next to Hitler's seat. Nyssen welcomes his guests from the business and political worlds, including Göring and Hitler. Wegener poisons Helga before the dinner, and she spills her glass as she's evacuated out of the room. Unbeknownst to the conspirators, the glass destroyed the wire, forcing Gereon to disguise himself as a sommelier to place a timer on the bomb. Meanwhile, van der Lubbe sneaks into the Reichstag to set the inside on fire. The first flames break out at the Reichstag as Charlotte and Gräf arrive there, and they enter the building only to see some police officers with flammable material reservoirs. Before the dinner can start, Wendt drives to the castle to warn Göring and Hitler, who depart immediately. A hysterical Nyssen yells at the rest of the guests to leave the castle, and hallucinates his mother once more. Noticing the time bomb, and willing to join her in the afterlife, he commits suicide by dying in the explosion. Gereon and the Armenian mistake the detonation as a success, and they fire a flare to alert Anno, who's at the Reichstag, and Jacoby, who's at the radio station. Jacoby turns on the radio for Anno to announce the news of Hitler's death in the hemicycle. He defends his actions as a necessary strike to defend the democratic values, institutions, and constitutional rights of the people. Gereon drives to the Reichstag and, seeing Hitler alive, realises too late the grave mistake of the moment. Inside, Anno is still giving his speech in front of a stunned Charlotte and van der Lubbe, who immediately sets the hemicycle on fire. Gereon enters the burning hall and attempts to save Anno. Realizing that Anno is willing to die on his own terms, he relives the trauma of the war for a second time. As he watches his brother collapse into the fire, Gereon chooses to die with him, but is pulled out by Charlotte. Following the Reichstag fire, the NSDAP accuses the communists of starting it. As a result, the Nazis arrest many journalists, politicians, leaders, and writers, including Litten, Jacky, Heymann, and Jacoby. Following the March 5th elections, which ended in a landslide victory for the party, the Nazis slowly acquired total power over the following years. Hans Litten was sent to Dachau concentration camp and committed suicide there in 1938. Van der Lubbe was found guilty of arson and high treason, and was guillotined in 1934. Ernst Gennat remained head of the Homicide Department, although his powers were largely restricted, and died in 1939 from bowel cancer. Otto Wels fled to Paris and died of natural causes in 1939, whereas Ernst Thälmann was executed at Buchenwald in 1944. Blank is executed during the subsequent Night of the Long Knives. Wendt pays a visit to von Schleicher, and shoots him and his wife, taking Hitler's medical file and locking it at the newly created Gestapo HQ. Dr. Forster and Ernst Weiss committed suicide. In March 1933, Nyssen's funeral is being held. At the same time, Charlotte and Gräf escape Germany and make their way to the Swiss border, while Gereon lives in hiding with the Armenian at the Strelow farm. There, Gereon writes a farewell letter to Charlotte, thanking her and saying how the city feels grayer without her. Once he finishes the letter, he blows out the candle. The final sequence shows a ruined Berlin in July 1945, having been repeatedly bombed and fought over. Gereon's fate remains unknown.

== Critical reception ==
On Rotten Tomatoes the first season holds approval rating of 100% based on 30 reviews, with the critics consensus reading: "Babylon Berlin's humor and humanity pair nicely with its hypnotic visuals, resulting in a show that dazzles within its oversaturated genre." As of April 2019, Babylon Berlin was the highest rated non-English language show on Sky TV.

Carolin Ströbele of Die Zeit praised the pilot, saying that it "is highly dynamic and unites sex, crime and history in a pleasantly unobtrusive manner." Christian Buss, cultural critic from Der Spiegel, praised the series for staying true to the tradition of "typically German angst cinema", in the vein of 1920s silent movies such as Fritz Lang's Metropolis or Robert Wiene's The Cabinet of Dr. Caligari. "It could be that Babylon Berlin is the first big German TV production since Das Boot which enjoys really relevant success abroad. Let's not be shy to say it: we [Germans] are big again – as the world champions of angst."

=== Accolades ===
The series itself received several awards in 2018. These included a Bambi in the category Beste Serie des Jahres (Best series of the year), four awards at the Deutscher Fernsehpreis (best dramatical series; best cinematography for Frank Griebe, Bernd Fischer and Philip Haberlandt; best musical score for Johnny Klimek and Tom Tykwer; and best production design for Pierre-Yves Gayraud and Uli Hanisch), a special Bavarian TV Award and a Romy for TV event of the year. In the same year, everyone majorly involved with the production of the series won a Grimme-Preis, including Volker Bruch, Liv Lisa Fries, Peter Kurth, the three directors and several members of the technical team. Bruch also won a Goldene Kamera in the category Best German actor for his portrayal of Gereon Rath.

The series' opening title sequence, created by German designer Saskia Marka and featuring a theme composed by Johnny Klimek and Tom Tykwer, was named the best title sequence of 2018 by industry website Art of the Title.

In December 2019, the European Film Academy awarded the series with the inaugural Achievement in Fiction Series Award at the European Film Awards.

=== Awards ===
Year	Award	Category	Nominee(s)	Result	Ref.
2017	Camerimage	Best Pilot	Babylon Berlin	Nominated	
2018	Adolf Grimme Awards	Outstanding Pilot	Babylon Berlin	Won	
2018	Bambi Awards	Best Television Show – National	Babylon Berlin	Won	
2018	Bambi Awards	Best Actress – National	Liv Lisa Fries	Nominated	
2018	Bambi Awards	Best Actor – National	Peter Kurth	Nominated	
2018	Bavarian TV Awards	Special Award	Babylon Berlin	Won	
2018	German Television Academy Awards	Best Costume Design	Pierre-Yves Gayraud	Won	
2018	German Television Academy Awards	Best Make Up	Kerstin Gaecklein, Roman Braunhofer	Won	
2018	German Television Academy Awards	Best Score	Tom Tykwer, Johnny Klimek	Won	
2018	German Television Academy Awards	Best Visual Effects	Robert Pinnow	Won	
2018	German Television Academy Awards	Best Stunts	Dana Stein	Won	
2018	German Television Academy Awards	Best Editor	Dana Stein	Nominated	
2018	German Screen Actors Awards	Best Supporting Actress	Leonie Benesch	Won	
2018	German Screen Actors Awards	Best Leading Actor	Peter Kurth	Nominated	
2018	German Television Awards	Best Series	Babylon Berlin	Won	
2018	German Television Awards	Best Cinematography	Frank Griebe, Bernd Fischer, Philipp Haberlandt	Won	
2018	German Television Awards	Best Music	Johnny Klimek, Tom Tykwer	Won	
2018	German Television Awards	Best Production and Costume Desige	Pierre-Yves Gayraud (costume designer), Uli Hanisch (production designer)	Won	
2018	German Television Awards	Best Directing for a Movie Made for Television or Miniseries	Tom Tykwer, Henk Handloegten, Achim von Borries	Nominated	
2018	German Television Awards	Best Actress	Liv Lisa Fries	Nominated	
2018	German Television Awards	Best Actor	Peter Kurth	Nominated	
2018	German Television Awards	Best Editing	Alexander Berner, Claus Wehlisch, Antje Zynga	Nominated	
2018	Golden Camera Awards	Best German Actor	Volker Bruch	Won	
2018	Golden Umbrella Television Awards	Best Cinematography	Bernd Fischer, Philipp Haberlandt, Frank Griebe	Won	
2018	Golden Umbrella Television Awards	Best Director	Achim von Borries, Tom Tykwer, Henk Handloegten	Won	
2018	Golden Umbrella Television Awards	Best Casting	Simone Bär	Won	
2018	Magnolia Awards	Best International Television Show	Babylon Berlin	Won	
2018	Ondas Awards	Best International Television Series	Babylon Berlin	Won	
2018	Romy Gala Awards	Television Event of the Year	Babylon Berlin	Won	
2018	Seoul International Drama Awards	Grand Prize	Babylon Berlin	Won	
2019	European Film Awards	European Achievement in Fiction Series Award	Babylon Berlin	Won	
2019	SXSW Film Design Award	Excellence in Title Design	Saskia Marka	Nominated	
2020	German Camera Awards	Best Cinematography	Christian Almesberger, Bernd Fischer, Philipp Haberlandt	Nominated	
2020	German Screen Actors Awards	Best Supporting Actor	Lars Eidinger	Nominated	
2020	German Television Awards	Best Drama Series	Babylon Berlin	Nominated	
2020	Location Managers Guild Awards	Outstanding Locations in Period Television	David Pieper	Nominated	
2020	Romy Gala Awards	Favorite Actor in a Series	Karl Markovics	Nominated	
2020	Rose d'Or	Best Drama	Babylon Berlin	Won	
2021	Motion Picture Sound Editors Awards	Outstanding Achievement in Sound Editing – Episodic Short Form – Dialogue/ADR	Frank Kruse, Benjamin Hörbe, Alexander Buck, Dominik Schleier, Thomas Kalbér (for "Episode 28")	Nominated	

== See also ==
- 1920s Berlin
- Adolf Hitler's rise to power
- Roaring Twenties
- Golden Twenties
- Weimar culture
- Berlin Alexanderplatz (1980 miniseries)
- Cabaret (1972 film)
- Swing Kids (1993 film)
