= 1920s Berlin =

Berlin-related events during the 1920s

The Golden Twenties was a particular vibrant period in the history of Berlin. After the Greater Berlin Act, the city became the third largest municipality in the world and experienced its heyday as a major world city. It was known for its leadership roles in science, the humanities, art, music, film, architecture, higher education, government, diplomacy and industries.

== Culture ==
The Weimar Republic era began in the midst of several major movements in the fine arts. German Expressionism had begun before World War I and continued to have a strong influence throughout the 1920s, although artists were increasingly likely to position themselves in opposition to expressionist tendencies as the decade went on.

A sophisticated, innovative culture developed in and around Berlin, including highly developed architecture and design (Bauhaus, 1919–33); a variety of literature (Döblin, Berlin Alexanderplatz, 1929), film (Lang, Metropolis, 1927, Dietrich, Der blaue Engel, 1930), painting (Grosz), and music (Brecht and Weill, The Threepenny Opera, 1928); criticism (Benjamin), philosophy/psychology (Jung), and fashion. This culture was often considered to be decadent and socially disruptive by rightists.

Film was making huge technical and artistic strides during this period of time in Berlin, and gave rise to the influential movement called German Expressionism. "Talkies", the sound films, were also becoming more popular with the general public across Europe, and Berlin was producing many of them.

The so-called mystical arts also experienced a revival during this time-period in Berlin, with astrology, the occult, and esoteric religions and off-beat religious practices becoming more mainstream and acceptable to the masses as they entered popular culture.

Berlin in the 1920s also proved to be a haven for English writers such as W. H. Auden, Stephen Spender and Christopher Isherwood, who wrote a series of 'Berlin novels', inspiring the play I Am a Camera, which was later adapted into a musical, Cabaret, and an Academy Award winning film of the same name. Spender's semi-autobiographical novel The Temple evokes the attitude and atmosphere of the time.

== Science ==
The University of Berlin (today Humboldt University of Berlin) became a major intellectual centre in Germany, Europe, and the world. The sciences were especially favored — from 1914 to 1933.

Albert Einstein rose to public prominence during his years in Berlin, being awarded the Nobel Prize for Physics in 1921. He served as director of the Kaiser Wilhelm Institute for Physics in Berlin, only leaving after the anti-Semitic Nazi Party rose to power.

Physician Magnus Hirschfeld established the Institut für Sexualwissenschaft (Institute for Sexology) in 1919, and it remained open until 1933. Hirschfeld believed that an understanding of homosexuality could be arrived at through science. Hirschfeld was a vocal advocate for homosexual, bisexual, and transgender legal rights for men and women, repeatedly petitioning parliament for legal changes. His Institute also included a museum.

== Street fights ==
Politically, Berlin was seen as a left wing stronghold, with the Nazis calling it "the reddest city [in Europe] after Moscow." Nazi propagandist Joseph Goebbels became his party's "Gauleiter" for Berlin in the autumn of 1926 and had only been in charge a week before organizing a march through a communist-sympathizing area that devolved into a street riot. The communists, who adopted the motto "Beat the fascists wherever you encounter them!" had their own paramilitary organization called the Roter Frontkämpferbund to battle the Nazis' Sturmabteilung (SA). In February 1927 the Nazis held a meeting in the "Red" stronghold of Wedding that turned into a violent brawl. "Beer glasses, chairs and tables flew through the hall, and severely injured people were left lying covered with blood on the floor. Despite the injuries, it was a triumph for Goebbels, whose followers beat up about 200 communists and drove them from the hall."

== Infrastructure and industrialization ==
The government began printing tremendous amounts of currency to pay reparations; this caused staggering inflation that destroyed middle-class savings. However, economic expansion resumed after mid-decade, aided by U.S. loans. It was then that culture blossomed especially.

The heyday of Berlin began in the mid-1920s when it was the most industrialized city of the Continent. Tempelhof Airport was opened in 1923 and a start was made on S-Bahn electrification from 1924 onwards. Berlin was also the second biggest inland harbor of Germany; all of this infrastructure was needed to transport and feed the over 4 million Berliners throughout the 1920s.

== Architecture and urban planning ==
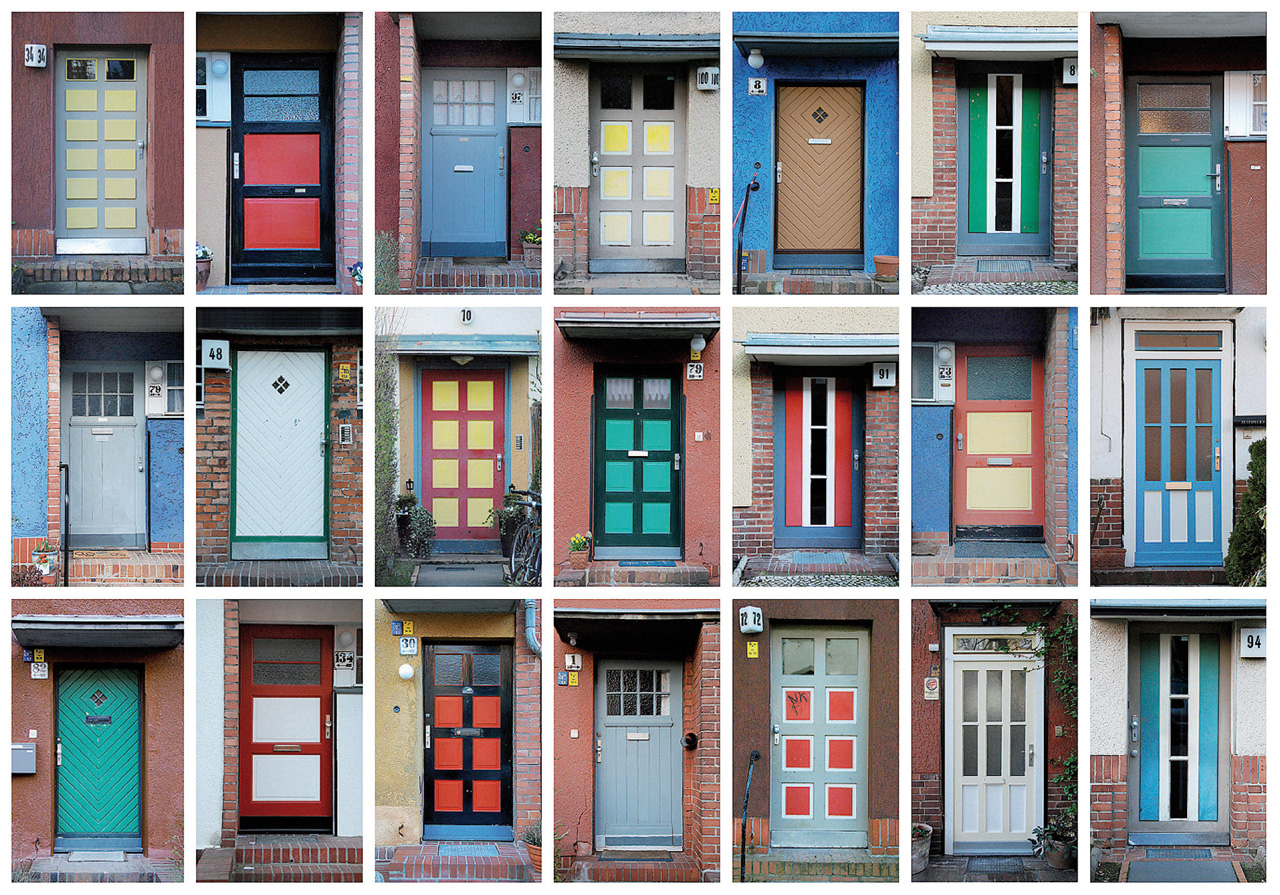
Color variations of doors and entrances in the Hufeisensiedlung (1925–1933)

During the interwar period high-quality architecture was built on a large scale in Berlin for broad sections of the population, including poorer people. In particular the Berlin Modernism housing estates built before the beginning of National Socialism set standards worldwide and therefore have been added to the UNESCO World-heritage list in 2008.

As a result of the economically difficult situation during the Weimar Republic, housing construction, which up to that time had been mainly privately financed and profit-oriented, had found itself at a dead end. Inflation was on the up and for citizens on low incomes decent housing was becoming increasingly unaffordable.

Consequently, the search was on to find new models for state-initiated housing construction, which could then be implemented with a passion from 1920 on following the creation of Greater Berlin and the accompanying reform of local and regional government. The requirements for the type of flats to be built and the facilities they were to have were clearly defined, and the city was divided into different building zones. Following some basic ideas of the Garden city movement two- to three-storey housing estates that were well integrated into the landscape of the suburbs of the city were planned. The first large estate of this type with more than 2,000 residential units was the so-called Hufeisensiedlung (Horseshoe Estate) designed by Bruno Taut in Berlin, which introduced a new type of high quality housing and became a prominent example for the use of colors in architecture.

== Reputation for decadence ==
Prostitution rose in Berlin and elsewhere in the areas of Europe left ravaged by World War I. This means of survival for desperate women, and sometimes men, became normalized to a degree in the 1920s. During the war, venereal diseases such as syphilis and gonorrhea spread at a rate that warranted government attention. Soldiers at the front contracted these diseases from prostitutes, so the German army responded by granting approval to certain brothels that were inspected by their own medical doctors, and soldiers were rationed coupon books for sexual services at these establishments. Homosexual behaviour was also documented among soldiers at the front. Soldiers returning to Berlin at the end of the War had a different attitude towards their own sexual behaviour than they had a few years previously. Prostitution was frowned on by respectable Berliners, but it continued to the point of becoming entrenched in the city's underground economy and culture.

Crime in general developed in parallel with prostitution in the city, beginning as petty thefts and other crimes linked to the need to survive in the war's aftermath. Berlin eventually acquired a reputation as a hub of drug dealing (cocaine, heroin, tranquilizers) and the black market. The police identified 62 organized criminal gangs in Berlin, called Ringvereine. The German public also became fascinated with reports of homicides, especially "lust murders" or Lustmord. Publishers met this demand with inexpensive criminal novels called Krimi, which like the film noir of the era (such as the classic M), explored methods of scientific detection and psychosexual analysis.

Apart from the new tolerance for behaviour that was technically still illegal, and viewed by a large part of society as immoral, there were other developments in Berlin culture that shocked many visitors to the city. Thrill-seekers came to the city in search of adventure, and booksellers sold many editions of guide books to Berlin's erotic night entertainment venues. There were an estimated 500 such establishments, that included a large number of homosexual venues for men and for lesbians; sometimes transvestites of one or both genders were admitted, otherwise there were at least five known establishments that were exclusively for a transvestite clientele. There were also several nudist venues. Berlin also had a museum of sexuality during the Weimar period, at Dr. Magnus Hirschfeld's Institute of Sexology. These were nearly all closed when the Nazi regime became a dictatorship in 1933.

Artists in Berlin became fused with the city's underground culture as the borders between cabaret and legitimate theatre blurred. Anita Berber, a dancer and actress, became notorious throughout the city and beyond for her erotic performances (as well as her cocaine addiction and erratic behaviour). She was painted by Otto Dix, and socialized in the same circles as Klaus Mann.

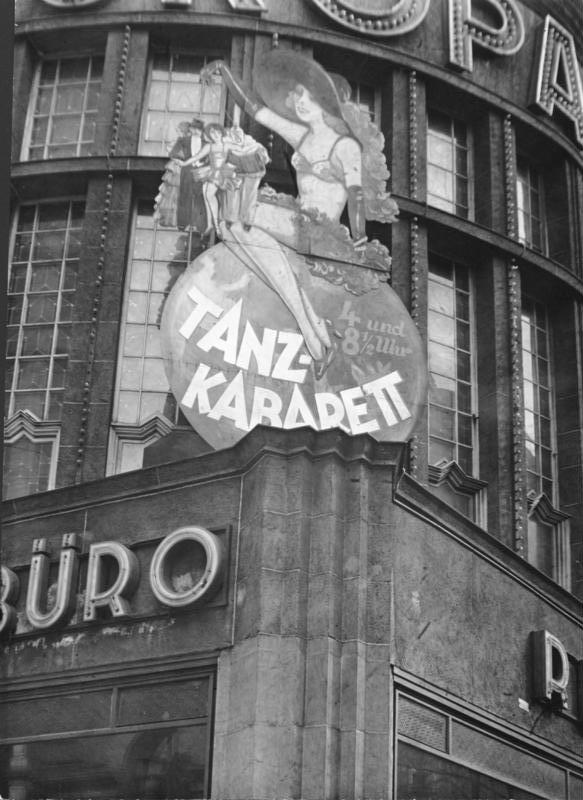
The Europahaus, one of hundreds of cabarets in Weimar Berlin, 1931

A scene from Different from the Others (1919), a film made in Berlin, whose main character struggles with his homosexuality

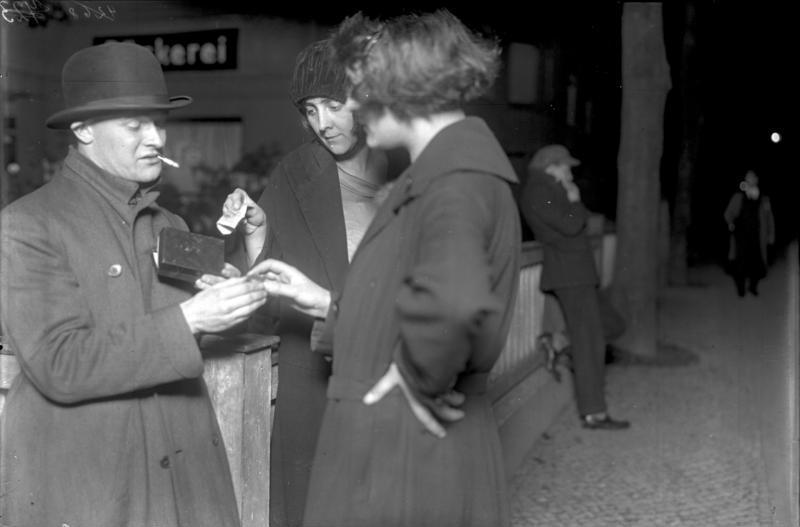
Prostitutes buy cocaine capsules from a drug dealer in Berlin, 1930. The capsules sold for 5 marks each.

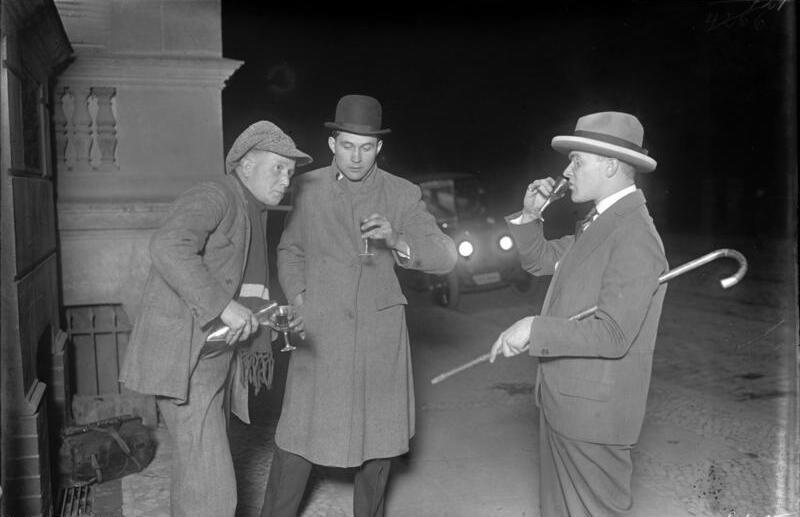
A liquor-seller after closing time on the road. His activity was illegal and the liquor, which cost one mark per glass, was often of quite dubious origin. The seller constantly changed his location.

== Life ==
1920s Berlin was a city of many social contrasts. While a large part of the population continued to struggle with high unemployment and deprivations in the aftermath of World War I, the upper class of society, and a growing middle class, gradually rediscovered prosperity and turned Berlin into a cosmopolitan city.

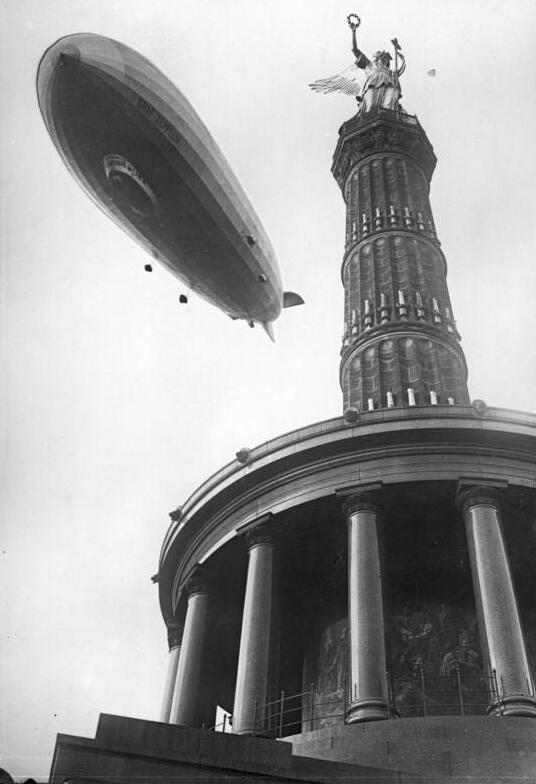
The Graf Zeppelin flies over the Victory Column, 1928.

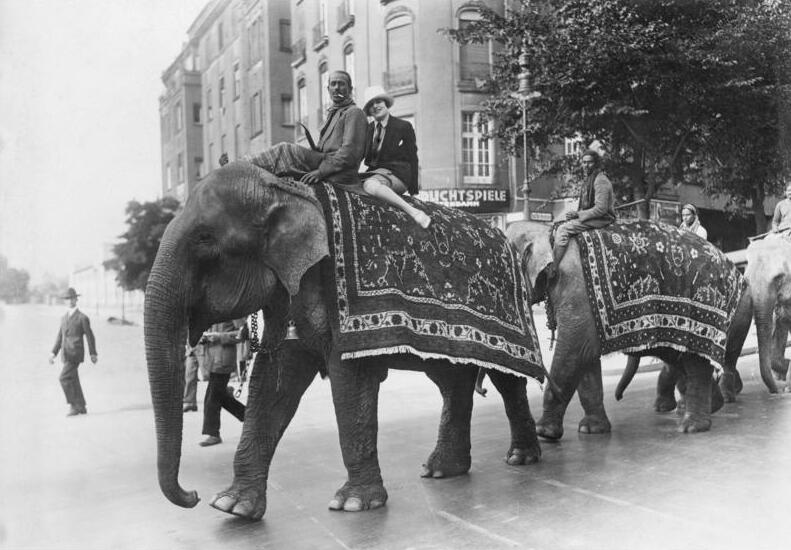
A parade of elephants with Indian trainers from the Hagenbeck show, on their way to the Berlin Zoo, 1926

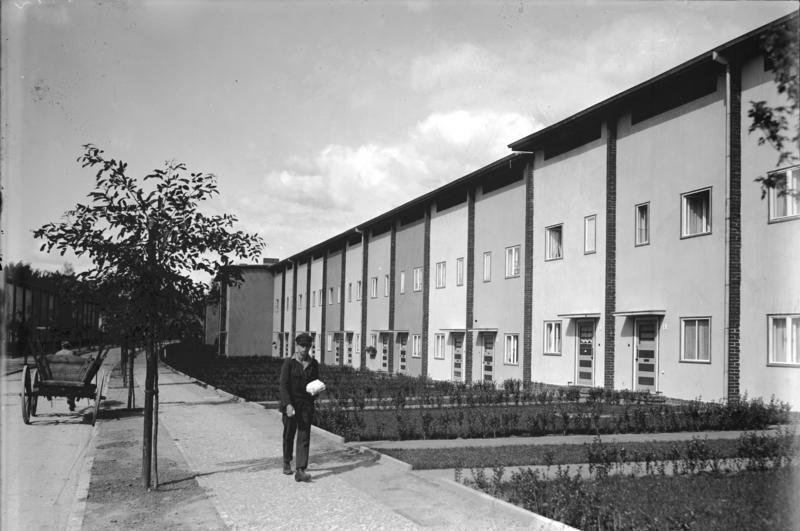
A Neues Bauen (New Building)-style housing development in Berlin-Zehlendorf, 1928

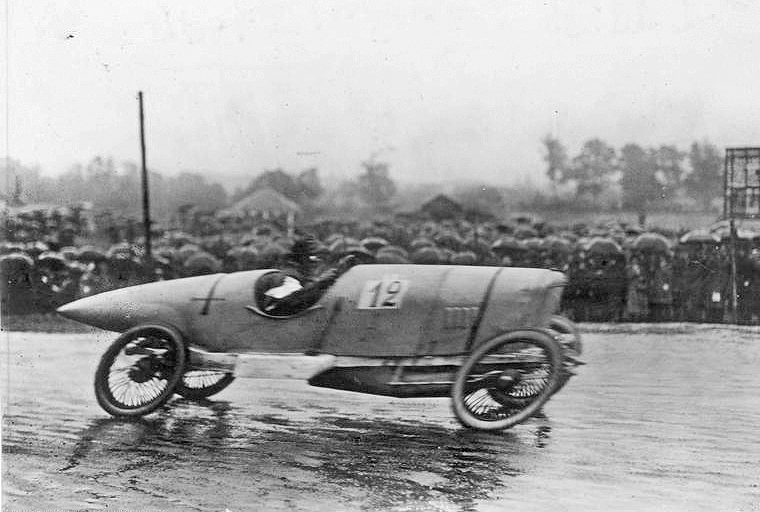
A 1922 autorace in Grunewald, Berlin

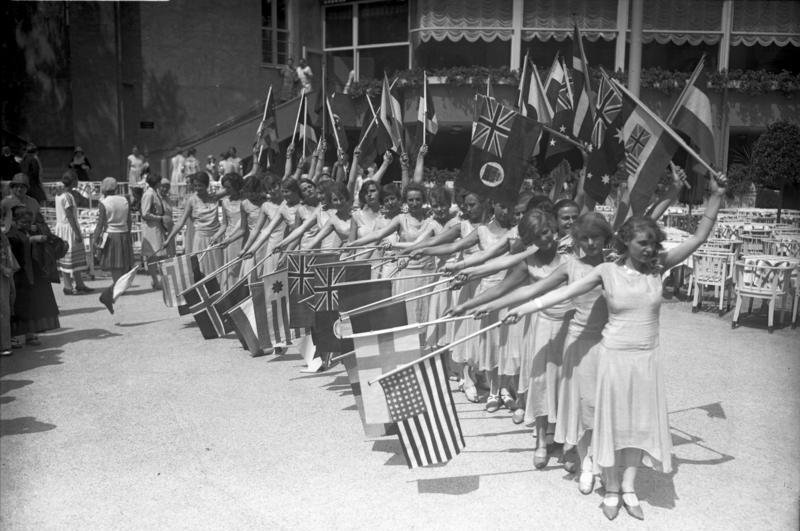
International Women's Union Congress in Berlin, 1929

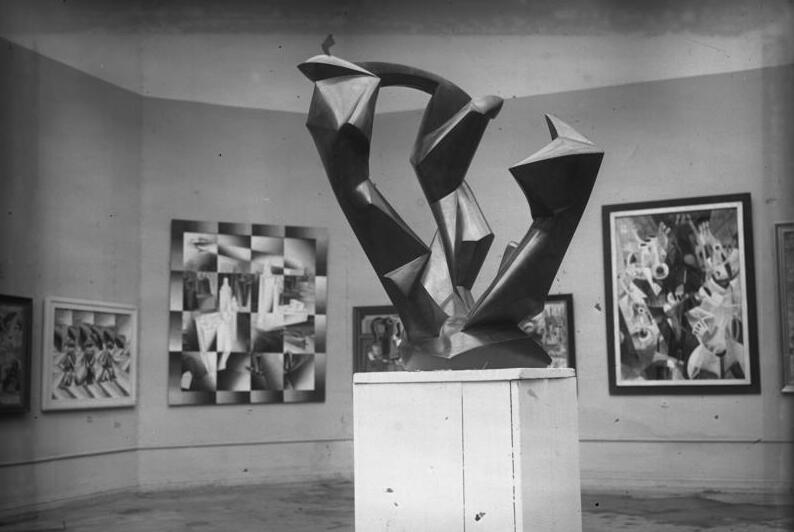
A Rudolf Belling sculpture on exhibit, 1929

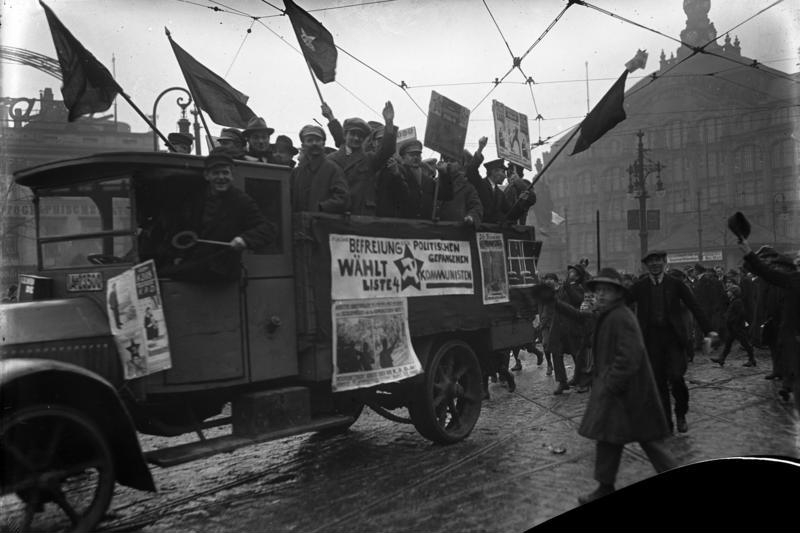
Communist campaigners during the Reichstag elections, 1924

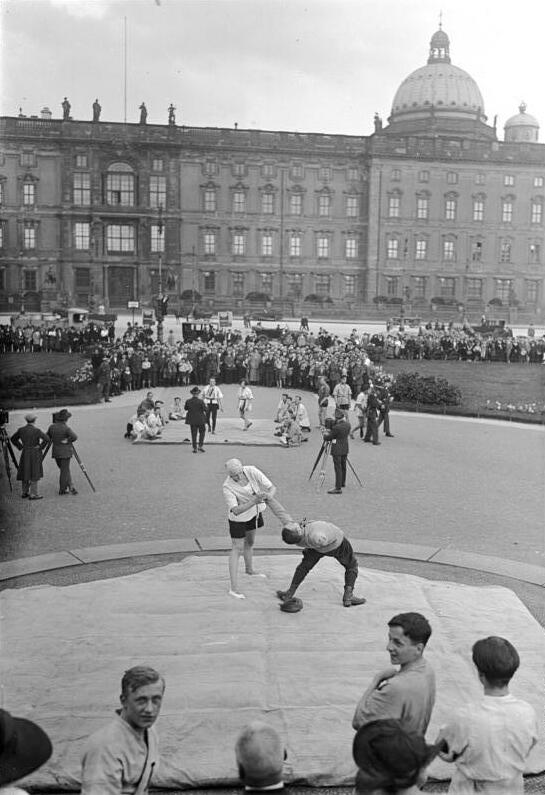
An exhibit of boxing, jiu jitsu, and other sports in the Lustgarten, 1925

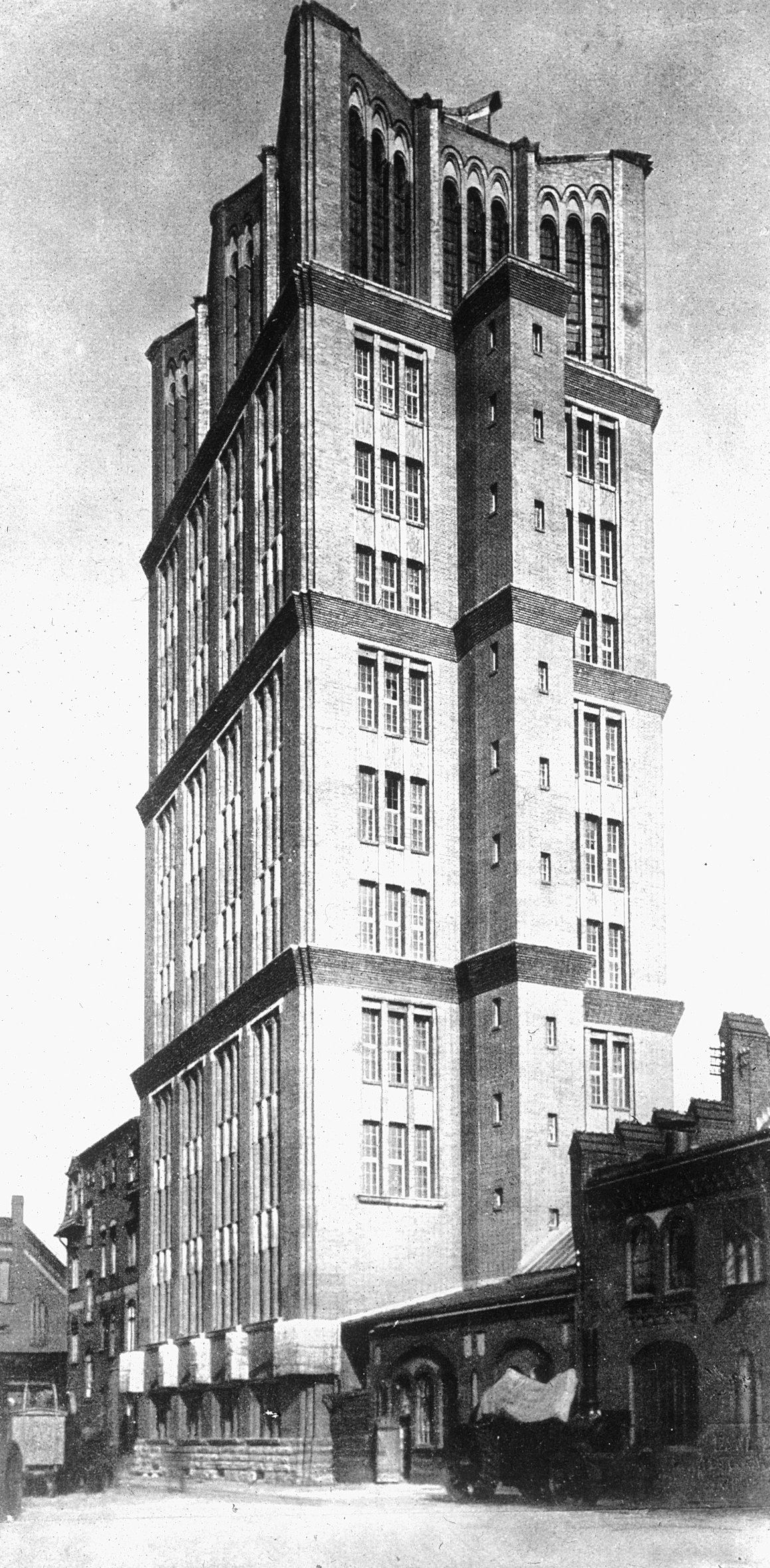
The Borsigturm (Borsig Tower), an example of Brick Expressionism (built 1922–1924)

== Cinema ==
Cinema in Weimar culture did not shy away from controversial topics, but dealt with them explicitly. Diary of a Lost Girl (1929) directed by Georg Wilhelm Pabst and starring Louise Brooks, deals with a young woman who is thrown out of her home after having an illegitimate child, and is then forced to become a prostitute to survive. This trend of dealing frankly with provocative material in cinema began immediately after the end of the War. In 1919, Richard Oswald directed and released two films, that met with press controversy and action from police vice investigators and government censors. Prostitution dealt with women forced into "white slavery", while Different from the Others dealt with a homosexual man's conflict between his sexuality and social expectations. By the end of the decade, similar material met with little, if any opposition when it was released in Berlin theatres. William Dieterle's Sex in Chains (1928), and Pabst's Pandora's Box (1929) deal with homosexuality among men and women, respectively, and were not censored. Homosexuality was also present more tangentially in other films from the period.

The following significant films about 1920s Berlin show the metropolis between 1920 and 1933:

- Dr. Mabuse the Gambler, 1922 – first (silent) film about the character Doctor Mabuse from the novels of Norbert Jacques, by Fritz Lang
- The Last Laugh, 1924 – the aging doorman at a Berlin hotel is demoted to washroom attendant but gets the last laugh, by F.W. Murnau
- Slums of Berlin (Die Verrufenen), 1925 – an engineer in Berlin is released from prison, but his father throws him out, his fiancée left him and there is no chance to find work. Directed by Gerhard Lamprecht.
- Die letzte Droschke von Berlin, 1926 – showing the life of an old coachman in Berlin still driving the droshky during the time when the automobile arises. Directed by Carl Boese.
- Die Stadt der Millionen, 1927 – first full-length documentary and experimental movie on Berlin, its people and their attitude towards life. Directed by Adolf Trotz.
- Berlin: Symphony of a Metropolis, 1927 – expressionist documentary film of 1920s Berlin by Walter Ruttmann
- Refuge (Zuflucht), 1928 – a lonely and tired man comes home after several years abroad, lives with a market-woman in Berlin and starts working for the Berlin U-Bahn. Directed by Carl Froelich.
- Asphalt, 1929 – the Berlin underworld touches a policeman's life, Film Noir classic by Joe May
- Mother Krause's Journey to Happiness , 1929 – depicts the cruelty of poverty in Wedding district and Communism as a rescuing force that reaches a mother and a child too late. Directed by Phil Jutzi.
- People on Sunday, 1930 – Avant-garde look at daily life in Berlin, screenplay by Billy Wilder and Curt Siodmak
- Symphonie einer Weltstadt (Berlin – Wie es war), 1930 – documentary view of Berlin by Leo de Laforgue. First showed in 1950.
- Die drei von der Tankstelle, 1930 – three friends are broke, so they sell their car and open a filling station in Berlin. The film shows the rising level of motorisation in Germany. Directed by Wilhelm Thiele.
- Cyankali, 1930 – a poor female office employee in Berlin gets pregnant, but abortion is not allowed in the Weimar Republic. So she goes to a quack doctor who applies toxic potassium cyanide to her. Directed by Hans Tintner.
- Emil and the Detectives, 1931 – the Adventure film based on the novel Emil and the Detectives by Erich Kästner shows Berlin from children's point of view. Director: Gerhard Lamprecht.
- M, 1931 – Berlin thriller by Fritz Lang; beginnings of film noir and the endings of expressionism
- Berlin-Alexanderplatz, 1931 – first film adaptation of the novel Berlin Alexanderplatz from Alfred Döblin, directed by Phil Jutzi
- Looking for His Murderer (Der Mann, der seinen Mörder sucht), 1931 – a man in Berlin plunged in debt does not succeed in committing suicide and has to hire a murderer to kill him within twelve hours. But in the same night he falls in love with a girl who wants to stop the appointed killer. Directed by Robert Siodmak.
- Grand Hotel, 1932 – showing the life of permanent residents in a Berlin Hotel. Directed by Edmund Goulding. Academy Award for Best Picture (1931–1932).
- Kuhle Wampe, 1932 – about a working-class family in Berlin in 1931 where survival is difficult during the Great Depression. Directed by Slatan Dudow.
- Die Umwege des schönen Karl, 1938 – a young waiter comes to Berlin in 1930 to serve at the best wine restaurant, and he tries unsuccessfully to get into the high society. Directed by Carl Froelich.
- Rotation, 1949 – showing the life of a working-class family in Berlin between 1920 and 1945, from the Great Depression over the Third Reich until the Battle of Berlin. Directed by Wolfgang Staudte.
- The Beaverskin (Die Buntkarierten), 1949 – the fate of a typical working-class family in Berlin between 1883 and 1949 facing child labour, trade union engagement, war, depression, unemployment and the rise and fall of Nazism. Directed by Kurt Maetzig.
- Der eiserne Gustav, 1958 – based on the novel by Hans Fallada and telling the true story of horse-drawn cabman Gustav Hartmann from Wannsee district who drove sensationally to Paris in 1928 to demonstrate against the rise of the motorcar taxicab. Directed by George Hurdalek.
- Wolf unter Wölfen, 1964 – the four-part movie based on the novel Wolf Among Wolves by Hans Fallada describes the Hyperinflation in the Weimar Republic in 1923 which led to widespread unemployment, homelessness, starvation and rioting in Berlin. Directed by Hans-Joachim Kasprzik.
- Honour Among Thieves, 1966 – comedy about the panderer and crime environment in 1925 Berlin. Directed by Wolfgang Staudte.
- Cabaret, 1972 – set in the early 1930s depicting Weimar Berlin from the writings of Christopher Isherwood; film by Bob Fosse
- Shot on Command – The Sass Brothers, Once Berlin's Big Crooks, 1972 – Franz and Erich Sass from Moabit district become the most famous and innovative bank robbers during 1920s Berlin. After a series of criminal acts in Denmark they get arrested, extradited to Nazi Germany and executed. Directed by Rainer Wolffhardt.
- Memories of Berlin: The Twilight of Weimar Culture, 1976 – Documentary about Berlin's cultural scene during the Weimar Republic, by Gary Conklin
- The Serpent's Egg, 1977 – an unemployed Jew in 1923 Berlin is offered a job by a professor performing medical experiments, foreshadowing Nazi human experimentation. Directed by Ingmar Bergman.
- Schöner Gigolo, armer Gigolo, 1978 – a Prussian officer returns home to Berlin following the end of World War I. Unable to find employment elsewhere, he works as a gigolo in a brothel run by a Baroness; by David Hemmings.
- Despair, 1978 – against the backdrop of the Nazis' rise, a Russian émigré and chocolate magnate in Berlin goes slowly mad. Directed by Rainer Werner Fassbinder.
- Pinselheinrich, 1979 – episodes from the life of famous Berlin illustrator Heinrich Zille. Zille gets dismissed from his work, starts to live from his funny and socially critical drawings but uses his earnings and rising fame to help people who are poorer than him. Directed by Hans Knötzsch.
- Berlin Alexanderplatz, 1980 – elaborate film of the novel written by Alfred Döblin. Made for television (in many parts) by Rainer Werner Fassbinder.
- Fabian, 1980 – in the late 1920s Berlin a copywriter observes the night life with his friend, gets unemployed during the Great Depression, but meets a new girlfriend. When his friend commits suicide and his girlfriend leaves him for a film career, he loses his livelihood. Based on the novel by Erich Kästner and directed by Wolf Gremm.
- Als Unku Edes Freundin war, 1981 – during the 1920s a circus driven by Sinti comes to the outskirts of Berlin. A Sinti girl becomes the friend of a poor German boy who tries to buy a bicycle to earn money for his family as a paperboy. Directed by Helmut Dziuba.
- Claire Berolina, 1987 – portrait of Claire Waldoff who became a famous cabaret singer in 1920s Berlin and was close friends with composer Walter Kollo, writer Kurt Tucholsky and illustrator Heinrich Zille. She was an important part of cultural and lesbian life in Berlin until the Nazi Machtergreifung ended her success. Directed by Klaus Gendries.
- Kai aus der Kiste, 1988 – during the hyperinflation in the Weimar Republic 1923 in Berlin a boy and his friends start a campaign of competitive advertising for an American chewing gum brand and use the resources of the metropolis for it. Based upon the novel by Wolf Durian and directed by Günter Meyer.
- Hanussen, 1988 – while recovering from being wounded during World War I, the Doctor discovers that Austrian Klaus Schneider possesses empathic powers. After the war, Schneider changes his name into Erik Jan Hanussen and goes to Berlin to perform as a hypnotist and mind reader. When he predicts Adolf Hitler's Machtergreifung and the Reichstag fire, the Nazis murder him. Directed by István Szabó.
- Spider's Web (Das Spinnennetz), 1989 – based on the 1923 novel by Joseph Roth and focused on a young opportunistic Leutnant who suffered personal and national humiliation during the downfall of the German Empire, and now becomes increasingly active in the right-wing underground of the early 1920s Berlin. Directed by Bernhard Wicki.
- A Letter Without Words, 1998 – reconstructing the life of a wealthy, Jewish amateur filmmaker in Berlin during the 1920s and early 1930s on the basis of authentic filmic material presented by her granddaughter. Directed by Lisa Lewenz.
- Invincible, 2001 – the true story of a Jewish strongman in 1932 Berlin by Werner Herzog
- Sass, 2001 – based on the true story of brothers Franz and Erich Sass from Moabit district, who became the most famous and innovative bank robbers during 1920s Berlin. Directed by Carlo Rola.
- Love in Thoughts (Was nützt die Liebe in Gedanken), 2004 – about the so-called Steglitz student tragedy in 1927, when two young men made a suicide pact under the influence of alcohol, music and sex, which led to a tragedy. Directed by Achim von Borries.
- Night Over Berlin, 2013 – a Jewish doctor and SPD-deputy at Reichstag faces the rising rows between Communists and Nazis in Berlin, the growing antisemitism, the Nazi Machtergreifung until the Reichstag fire, followed by the end of the key civil liberties in 1933.

== See also ==
- Alexanderplatz
- Berlin Alexanderplatz (novel)
- Erik Jan Hanussen
- Friedrichstraße
- Glitter and Doom - German portraits from the 1920s
- Kreuzberg
- Nightlife
- Potsdamer Platz
- Weimar culture
- Universum Film AG (UFA)
- Babylon Berlin - A TV-series about Berlin in the 1920s
- A website about life in Berlin 1919-1933
