= Weimar culture =

Emergence of art and science in the Weimar Republic

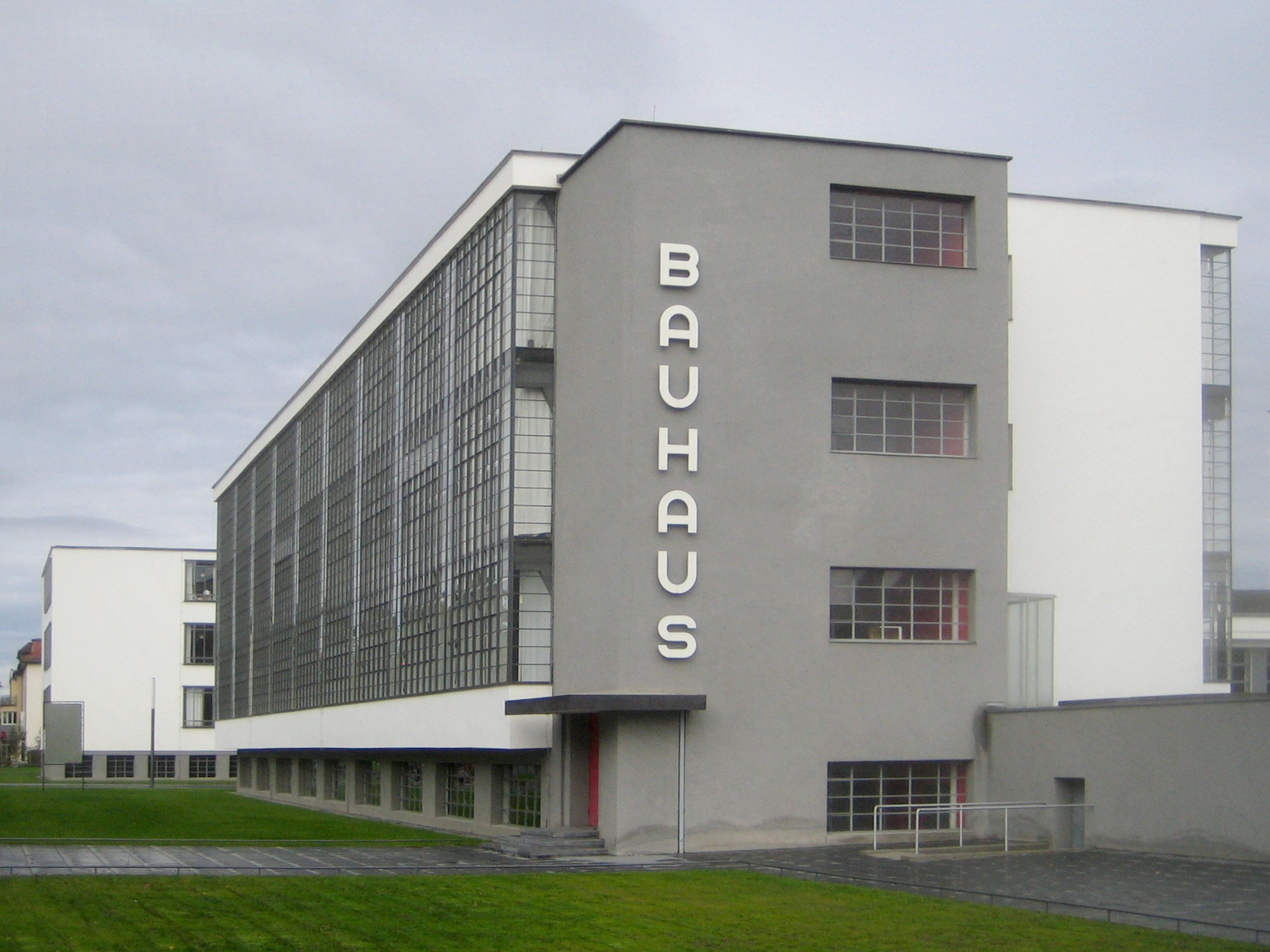
Bauhaus Dessau, built from 1925 to 1926 to a design by Walter Gropius, who founded "modern architecture"

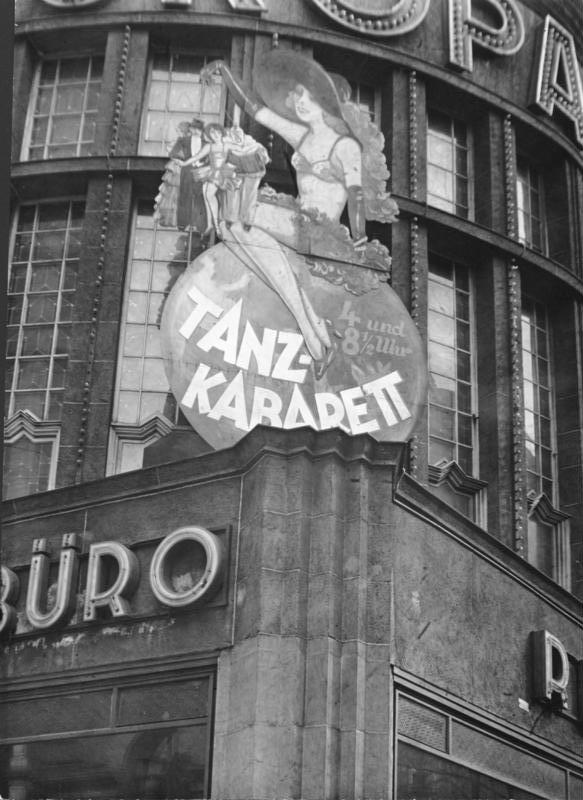
The Europahaus, one of hundreds of cabarets in Weimar Berlin, 1931

Weimar culture was the emergence of the arts and sciences that happened in Germany during the Weimar Republic, the latter during that part of the interwar period between Germany's defeat in World War I in 1918 and Hitler's rise to power in 1933. 1920s Berlin was at the hectic center of the Weimar culture. Although not part of the Weimar Republic, German-speaking Austria, and particularly Vienna, is also sometimes included as part of Weimar culture.

Germany, and Berlin in particular, was fertile ground for intellectuals, artists, and innovators from many fields during the Weimar Republic years. The social environment was chaotic, and politics were passionate. German university faculties became universally open to Jewish scholars in 1918. Leading Jewish intellectuals on university faculties included physicist Albert Einstein; sociologists Karl Mannheim, Erich Fromm, Theodor Adorno, Max Horkheimer, and Herbert Marcuse; philosophers Ernst Cassirer and Edmund Husserl; political theorists Arthur Rosenberg and Gustav Meyer; and many others. Nine German citizens were awarded Nobel Prizes during the Weimar Republic, five of whom were Jewish scientists, including two in medicine. Jewish intellectuals and creative professionals were among the prominent figures in many areas of Weimar culture.

With the rise of Nazism and the ascent to power of Adolf Hitler in 1933, many German intellectuals and cultural figures, both Jewish and non-Jewish, fled Germany for the United States, the United Kingdom, and other parts of the world. The intellectuals associated with the Institute for Social Research (also known as the Frankfurt School) fled to the United States and reestablished the Institute at the New School for Social Research in New York City. In the words of Marcus Bullock, Emeritus Professor of English at University of Wisconsin–Milwaukee, "Remarkable for the way it emerged from a catastrophe, more remarkable for the way it vanished into a still greater catastrophe, the world of Weimar represents modernism in its most vivid manifestation." The culture of the Weimar period was later reprised by 1960s left-wing intellectuals, especially in France. Gilles Deleuze, Félix Guattari, and Michel Foucault reprised Wilhelm Reich; Jacques Derrida reprised Edmund Husserl and Martin Heidegger; Guy Debord and the Situationist International reprised the subversive-revolutionary culture.

== Social environment ==
By 1919, an influx of labor had migrated to Berlin turning it into a fertile ground for the modern arts and sciences, leading to booms in trade, communications and construction. A trend that had begun before the Great War was given powerful impetus by fall of the Kaiser and royal power. In response to the shortage of pre-war accommodation and housing, tenements were built not far from the Kaiser's Stadtschloss and other majestic structures erected in honor of former nobles. Average people began using their backyards and basements to run small shops, restaurants, and workshops. Commerce expanded rapidly, and included the establishment of Berlin's first department stores, prior to World War I. An "urban petty bourgeoisie" along with a growing middle class grew and flourished in wholesale commerce, retail trade, factories and crafts.

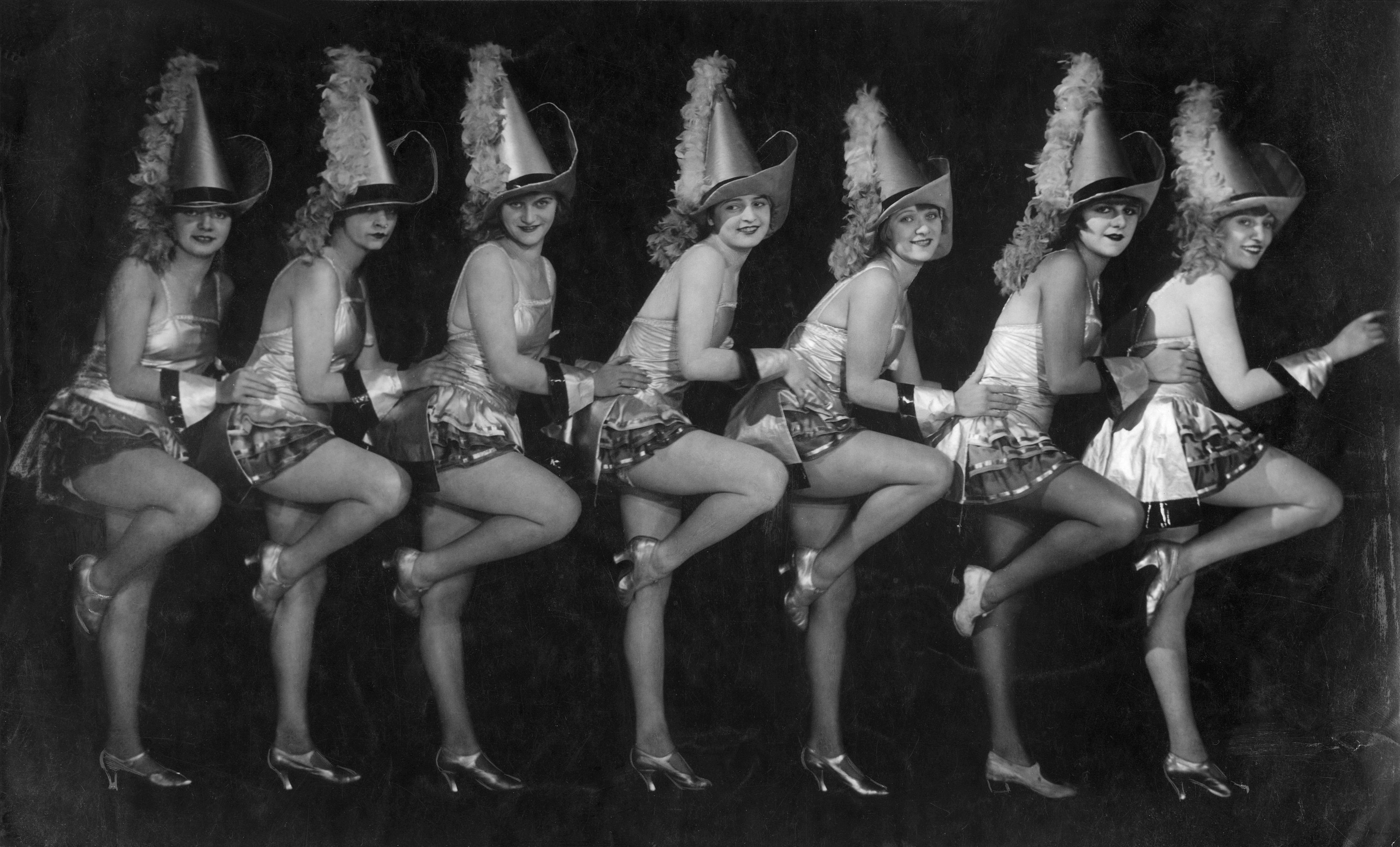
Dancers in Berlin in 1927

Types of employment were becoming more modern, shifting gradually but noticeably towards industry and services. Before World War I, in 1907, 54.9% of German workers were manual labourers. This dropped to 50.1% by 1925. Office workers, managers, and bureaucrats increased their share of the labour market from 10.3% to 17% over the same period. Germany was slowly becoming more urban and middle class. Still, by 1925, only a third of Germans lived in large cities; the other two-thirds of the population lived in the smaller towns or in rural areas. The total population of Germany rose from 62.4 million in 1920 to 65.2 million in 1933.

The Wilhelminian values were further discredited as a consequence of World War I and the subsequent inflation, since the new youth generation saw no point in saving for marriage in such conditions, and preferred instead to spend and enjoy. According to cultural historian Bruce Thompson, the Fritz Lang movie Dr. Mabuse the Gambler (1922) captures Berlin's postwar mood:

The film moves from the world of the slums to the world of the stock exchange and then to the cabarets and nightclubs–and everywhere chaos reigns, authority is discredited, power is mad and uncontrollable, wealth inseparable from crime.

Politically and economically, the nation was struggling with the terms and reparations imposed by the Treaty of Versailles (1919) that ended World War I and endured punishing levels of inflation.

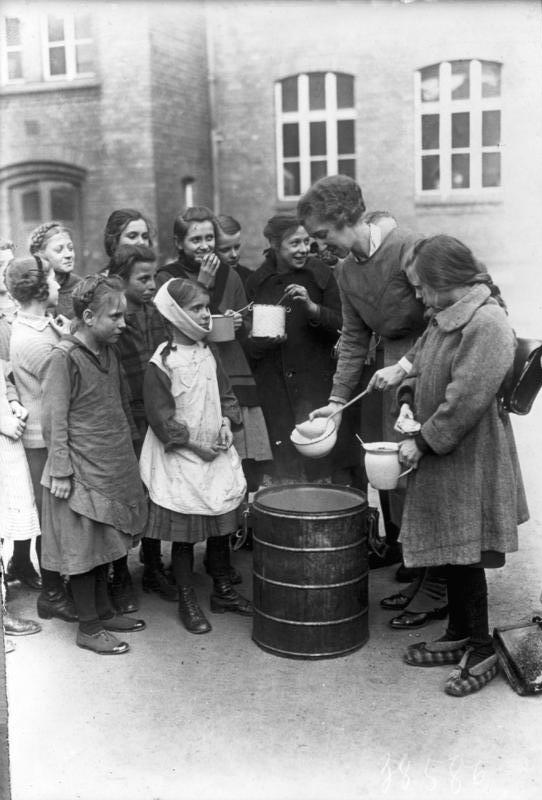
Children being fed by a soup kitchen, 1924

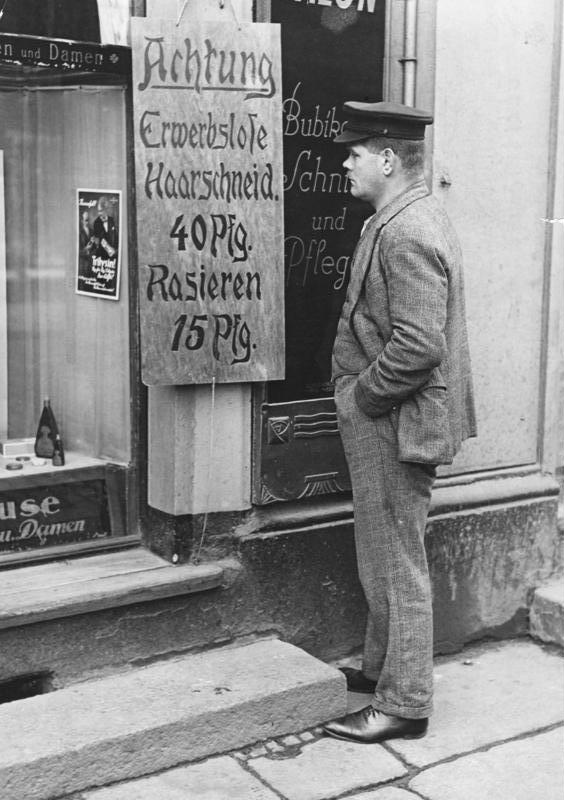
A man reads a sign advertising "Attention, Unemployed, Haircut 40 pfennigs, Shave 15 pfennigs", 1927

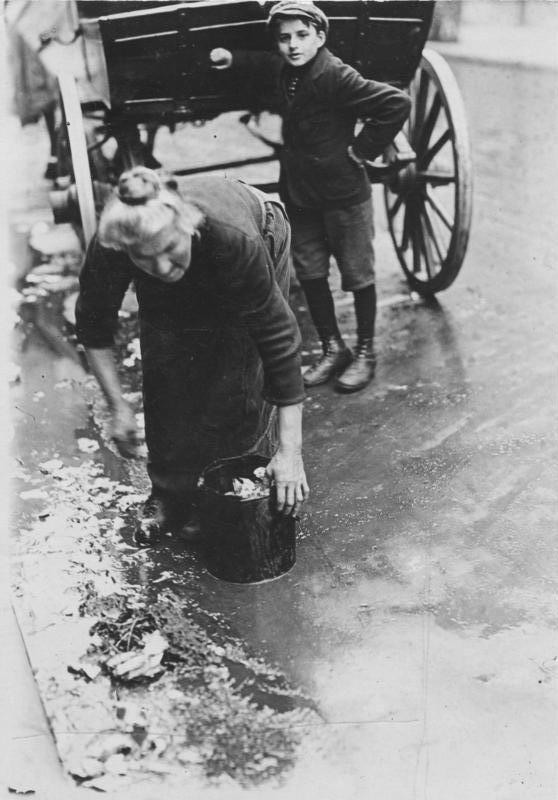
An elderly woman gathers vegetable waste tossed from a vegetable seller's wagon for her lunch, 1923

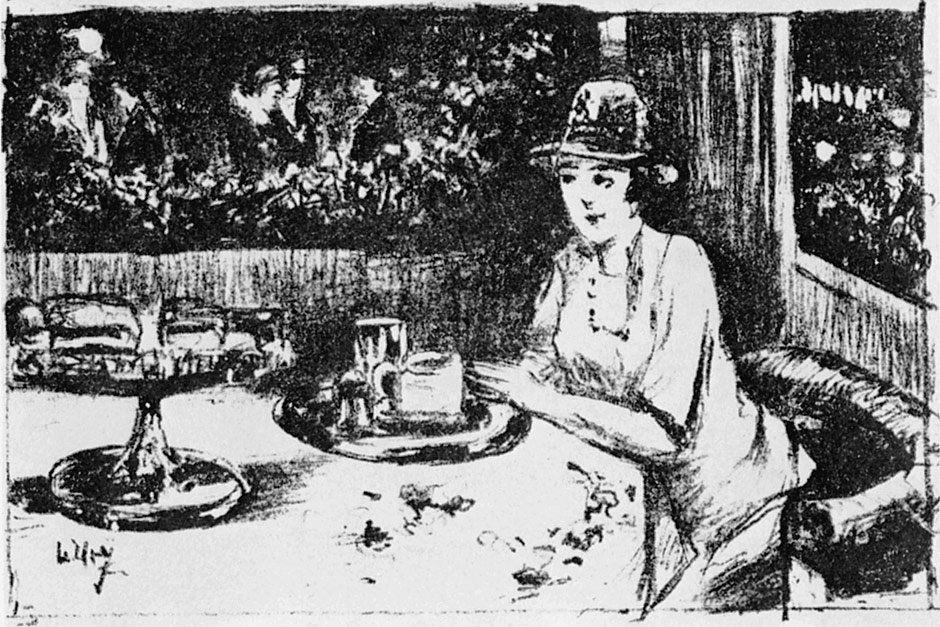
Sketch of a woman in a café by Lesser Ury for a Berlin newspaper, 1925

== Sociology ==
During the era of the Weimar Republic, Germany became a center of intellectual thought at its universities, and most notably social and political theory (especially Marxism) was combined with Freudian psychoanalysis to form the highly influential discipline of critical theory—with its development at the Institute for Social Research (also known as the Frankfurt School) founded at the University of Frankfurt am Main.

The most prominent philosophers with which the so-called 'Frankfurt School' is associated were Erich Fromm, Herbert Marcuse, Theodor Adorno, Walter Benjamin, Jürgen Habermas, and Max Horkheimer. Among the prominent philosophers not associated with the Frankfurt School were Martin Heidegger and Max Weber.

The German philosophical anthropology movement also emerged at this time.

== Science ==
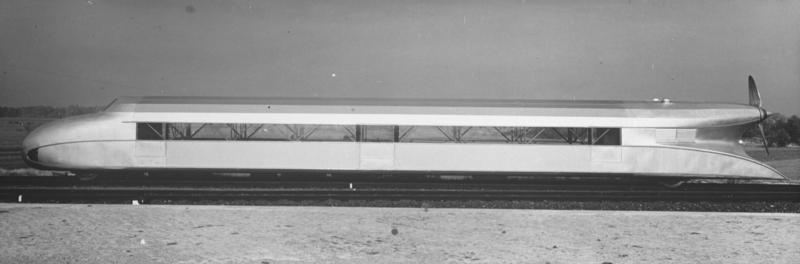
This prototype high-speed train travelled at 230 km per hour from Hamburg to Berlin, 1931. It was built by the Krukenberg engineering company.

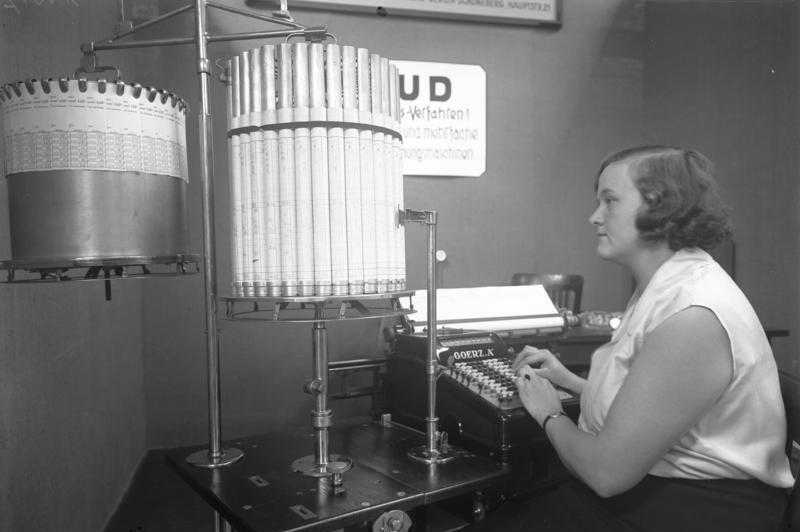
An early calculator shown at an office technology exhibition, Berlin, 1931. It was promoted as costing 3,500 marks.

Many foundational contributions to quantum mechanics were made in Weimar Germany or by German scientists during the Weimar period. While temporarily at the University of Copenhagen, German physicist Werner Heisenberg formulated his Uncertainty principle, and, with Max Born and Pascual Jordan, accomplished the first complete and correct definition of quantum mechanics, through the invention of Matrix mechanics.

Göttingen was the center of research in aero- and fluid-dynamics in the early 20th century. Mathematical aerodynamics was founded by Ludwig Prandtl before World War I, and the work continued at Göttingen until interfered with in the 1930s and prohibited in the late 1940s. It was there that compressibility drag and its reduction in aircraft was first understood. A striking example of this is the Messerschmitt Me 262, which was designed in 1939, but resembles a modern jet transport more that it did other tactical aircraft of its time.

Albert Einstein rose to public prominence during his years in Berlin, being awarded the Nobel Prize for Physics in 1921. He was forced to flee Germany and the Nazi regime in 1933.

Physician Magnus Hirschfeld established the Institut für Sexualwissenschaft (Institute for Sexology) in 1919, and it remained open until 1933. Hirschfeld believed that an understanding of homosexuality could be arrived at through science. Hirschfeld was a vocal advocate for homosexual, bisexual, and transgender legal rights for men and women, repeatedly petitioning parliament for legal changes. His Institute also included a museum. The Institute, museum, and the Institute's library and archives were all destroyed by the Nazi regime in 1933.

In German-speaking Vienna, Mathematician Kurt Gödel published his groundbreaking Incompleteness Theorem during the Weimar years.

== Education ==
New schools were frequently established in Weimar Germany to engage students in experimental methods of learning. Some were part of an emerging trend that combined research into physical movement and overall health, for example Eurythmy ensembles in Stuttgart that spread to other schools. Philosopher Rudolf Steiner established the first Waldorf education school in 1919, using a pedagogy also known as the Steiner method, which spread worldwide. Many Waldorf schools are in existence today.

== The arts ==
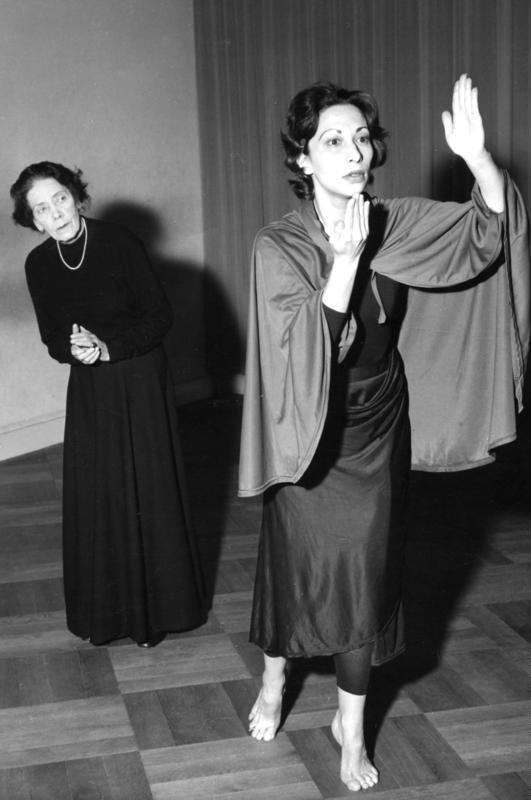
Mary Wigman (left)

The fourteen years of the Weimar era were also marked by explosive intellectual productivity. German artists made multiple cultural contributions in the fields of literature, art, architecture, music, dance, drama, and the new medium of the motion picture. Political theorist Ernst Bloch described Weimar culture as a Periclean Age.

German visual art, music, and literature were all strongly influenced by German Expressionism at the start of the Weimar Republic. By 1920, a sharp turn was taken towards the Neue Sachlichkeit New Objectivity outlook. New Objectivity was not a strict movement in the sense of having a clear manifesto or set of rules. Artists gravitating towards this aesthetic defined themselves by rejecting the themes of expressionism—romanticism, fantasy, subjectivity, raw emotion and impulse—and focused instead on precision, deliberateness, and depicting the factual and the real.

Kirkus Reviews remarked upon how much Weimar art was political:

fiercely experimental, iconoclastic and left-leaning, spiritually hostile to big business and bourgeois society and at daggers drawn with Prussian militarism and authoritarianism. Not surprisingly, the old autocratic German establishment saw it as 'decadent art', a view shared by Adolf Hitler who became Chancellor of Germany in January 1933. The public burning of 'unGerman books' by Nazi students on Unter den Linden on 10th May 1933 was but a symbolic confirmation of the catastrophe which befell not only Weimar art under Hitler but the whole tradition of enlightenment liberalism in Germany, a tradition whose origins went back to the 18th century city of Weimar, home to both Goethe and Schiller.

One of the first major events in the arts during the Weimar Republic was the founding of the Novembergruppe (November Group) on 3 December 1918. This organization was established in the aftermath of the November beginning of the German Revolution of 1918–1919, when communists, anarchists, and pro-republic supporters fought in the streets for control of the government. In 1919, the Weimar Republic was established. Around 100 artists of many genres who identified themselves as avant-garde joined the November Group. They held 19 exhibitions in Berlin until the group was banned by the Nazi regime in 1933. The group also had chapters throughout Germany during its existence, and brought the German avant-garde art scene to world attention by holding exhibits in Rome, Moscow and Japan.

Its members also belonged to other art movements and groups during the Weimar Republic era, such as architect Walter Gropius (founder of Bauhaus), and Kurt Weill and Bertolt Brecht (agitprop theatre). The artists of the November Group kept the spirit of radicalism alive in German art and culture during the Weimar Republic. Many of the painters, sculptors, music composers, architects, playwrights, and filmmakers who belonged to it, and still others associated with its members, were the same ones whose art would later be denounced as "degenerate art" by Adolf Hitler.

=== Visual arts ===
Cut with the Dada Kitchen Knife through the Last Weimar Beer-Belly Cultural Epoch in Germany (1919) by Hannah Höch, a Dada pioneer of photomontage art

The Weimar Republic era began in the midst of several major movements in the fine arts that continued into the 1920s. German Expressionism had begun before World War I and continued to have a strong influence throughout the 1920s, although artists were increasingly likely to position themselves in opposition to expressionist tendencies as the decade went on.

Dada had begun in Zurich during World War I, and became an international phenomenon. Dada artists met and reformed groups of like-minded artists in Paris, Berlin, Cologne, and New York City. In Germany, Richard Huelsenbeck established the Berlin group, whose members included Jean Arp, John Heartfield, Johannes Baader, Raoul Hausmann, George Grosz, Hannah Höch, and Wieland Herzfelde. Machines, technology, and a strong Cubism element were features of their work. Jean Arp and Max Ernst formed a Cologne Dada group, and held a Dada Exhibition there that included a work by Ernst that had an axe "placed there for the convenience of anyone who wanted to attack the work". Kurt Schwitters established his own solitary one-man Dada "group" in Hanover, where he filled two stories of a house (the Merzbau) with sculptures cobbled together with found objects and ephemera, each room dedicated to a notable artist friend of Schwitter's. The house was destroyed by Allied bombs in 1943.

The New Objectivity artists did not belong to a formal group. However, various Weimar Republic artists were oriented towards the concepts associated with it. Broadly speaking, artists linked with New Objectivity include Käthe Kollwitz, Otto Dix, Max Beckmann, George Grosz, John Heartfield, Conrad Felixmüller, Christian Schad, and Rudolf Schlichter, who all "worked in different styles, but shared many themes: the horrors of war, social hypocrisy and moral decadence, the plight of the poor and the rise of Nazism".

Otto Dix and George Grosz referred to their own movement as "[German] Verism", a reference to the Roman classical Verism approach called verus, meaning "truth", warts and all. While their art is recognizable as a bitter, cynical criticism of life in Weimar Germany, they were striving to portray a sense of realism that they saw missing from expressionist works. New Objectivity became a major undercurrent in all of the arts during the Weimar Republic.

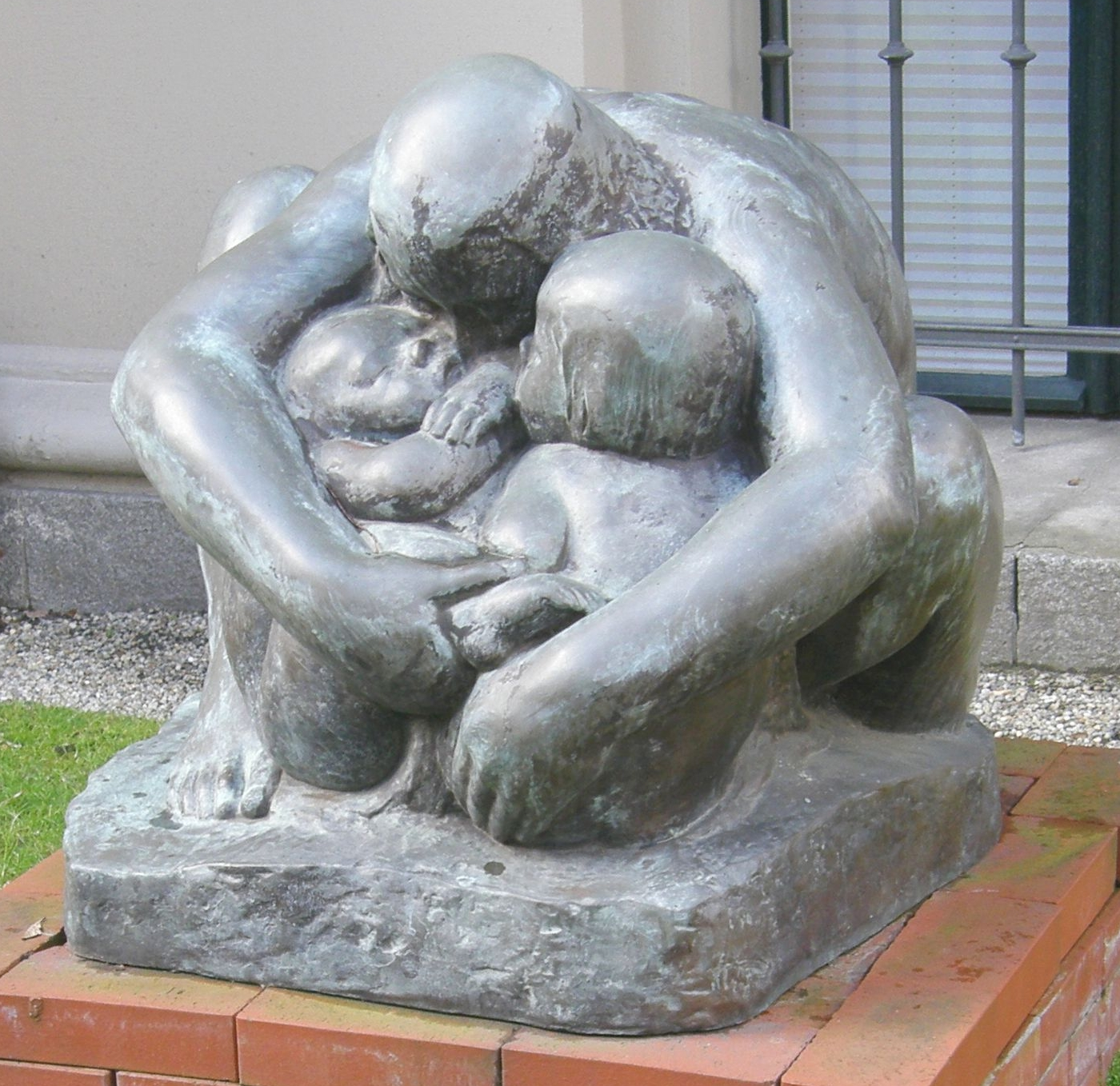
Mother with Children by Käthe Kollwitz, 1927–37

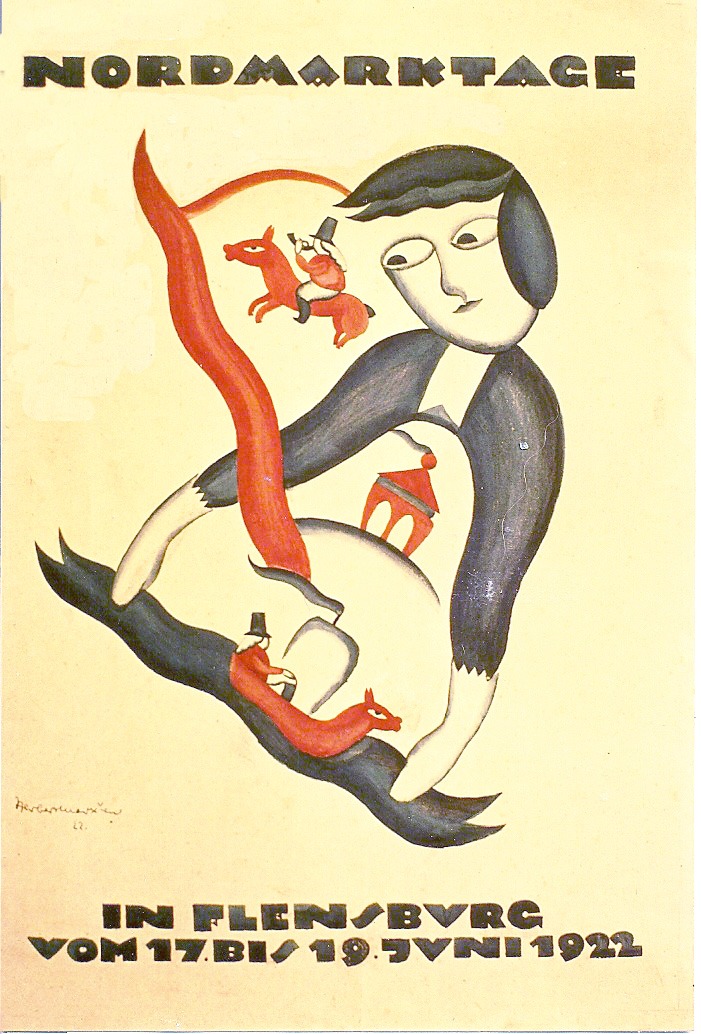
A New Objectivity-style poster by caricaturist Herbert Marxen (1922), condemned by the press as anti-futurist.

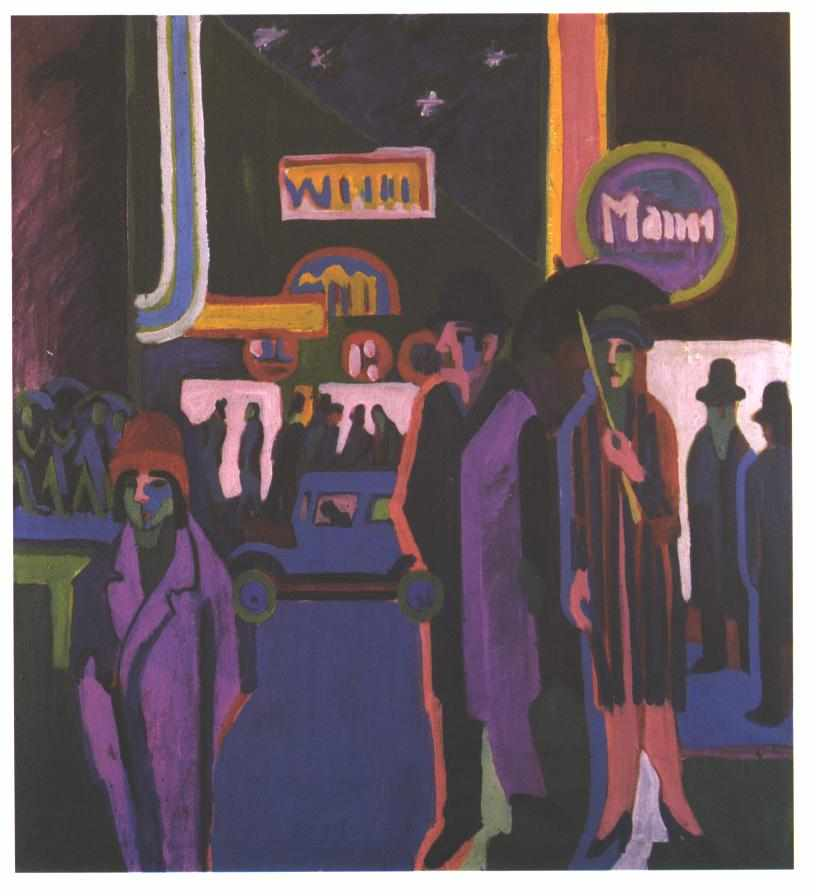
Street Scene at Night by Ernst Ludwig Kirchner, 1926-27

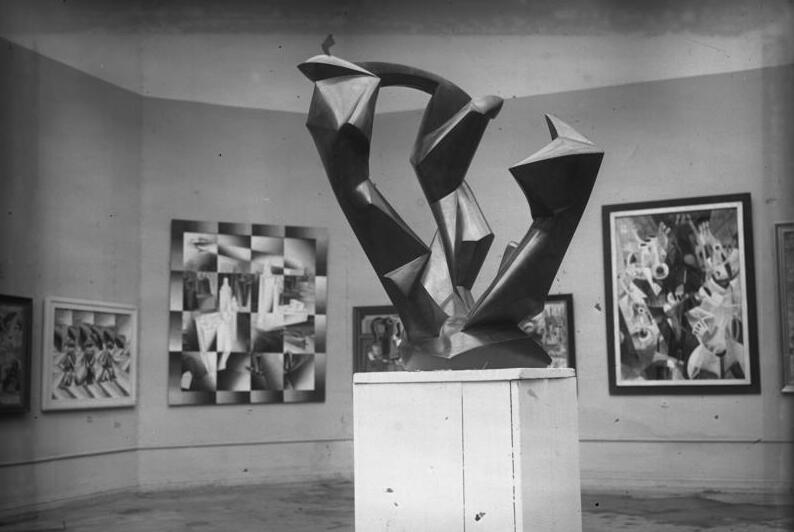
A Rudolf Belling sculpture exhibited in 1929

=== Design ===
The design field during the Weimar Republic witnessed some radical departures from styles that had come before it. Bauhaus-style designs are distinctive, and synonymous with modern design. Designers from these movements turned their energy towards a variety of objects, from furniture, to typography, to buildings. Dada's goal of critically rethinking design was similar to Bauhaus, but whereas the earlier Dada movement was an aesthetic approach, the Bauhaus was literally a school, an institution that combined a former school of industrial design with a school of arts and crafts. The founders intended to fuse the arts and crafts with the practical demands of industrial design, to create works reflecting the New Objectivity aesthetic in Weimar Germany. Walter Gropius, a founder of the Bauhaus school, stated: "we want an architecture adapted to our world of machines, radios and fast cars." Berlin and other parts of Germany still have many surviving landmarks of the architectural style at the Bauhaus. The mass housing projects of Ernst May and Bruno Taut are evidence of markedly creative designs being incorporated as a major feature of new planned communities. Erich Mendelsohn and Hans Poelzig are other prominent Bauhaus architects, while Mies van der Rohe is noted for his architecture and his industrial and household furnishing designs.

Painter Paul Klee was a faculty member of Bauhaus. His lectures on modern art (now known as the Paul Klee Notebooks) at the Bauhaus have been compared for importance to Leonardo's Treatise on Painting and Newton's Principia Mathematica, constituting the Principia Aesthetica of a new era of art;

Bruno Taut and Adolf Behne founded the Arbeitsrat für Kunst (Workers' Council for Art) in 1919. Their aim was to assert pressure for political change on the Weimar Republic government, that would benefit the management of architecture and arts management, similar to Germany's large councils for workers and soldiers. This Berlin organization had around 50 members.

Still another influential affiliation of architects was the group Der Ring (The Ring) established by ten architects in Berlin in 1923-24, including: Otto Bartning, Peter Behrens, Hugo Häring, Erich Mendelsohn, Mies van der Rohe, Bruno Taut, and Max Taut. The group promoted the progress of modernism in architecture.

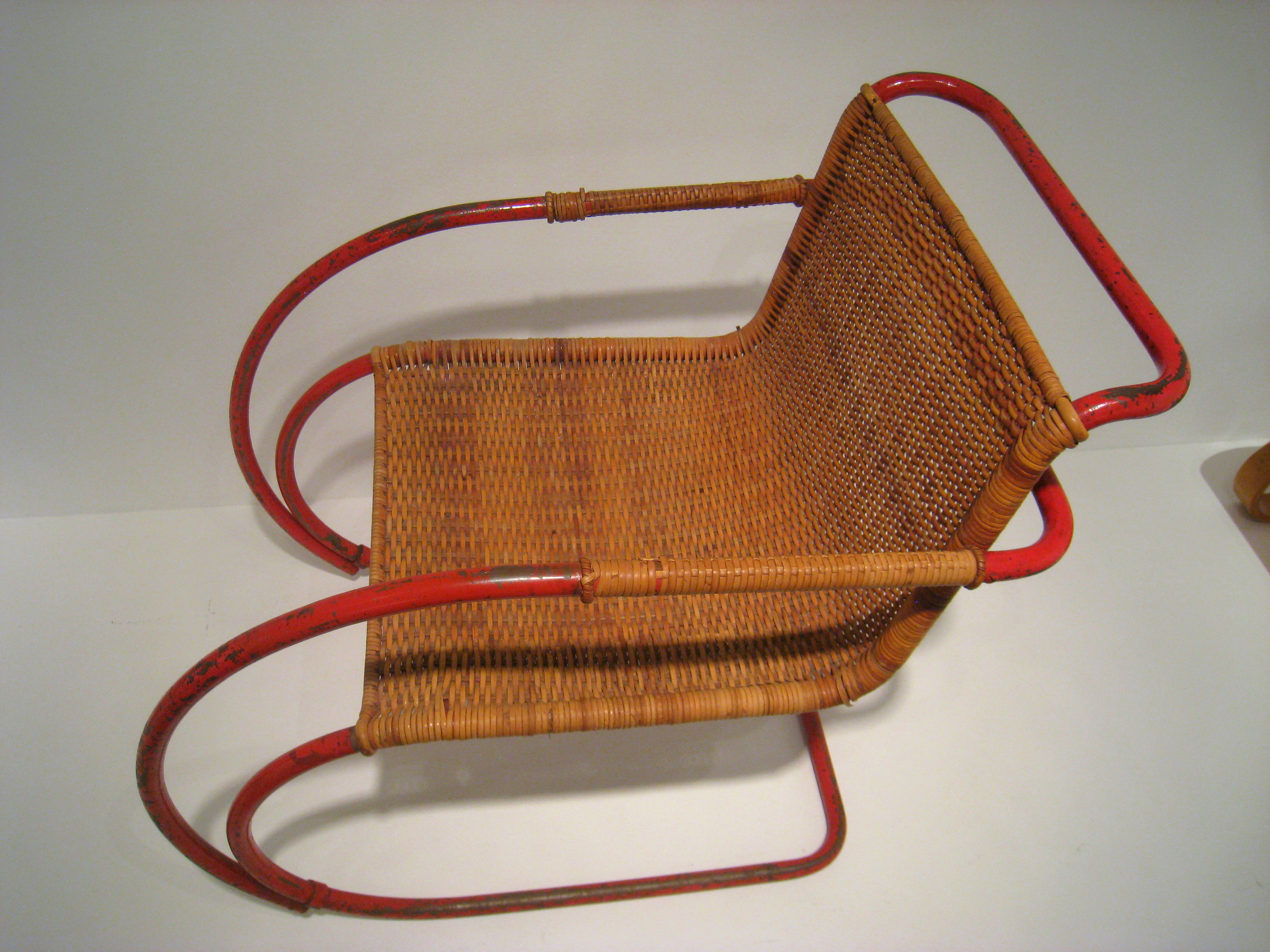
Armchair, model MR-20, 1927, by designer Mies van der Rohe, manufactured by Bamberg Metallwerkstatten, Berlin

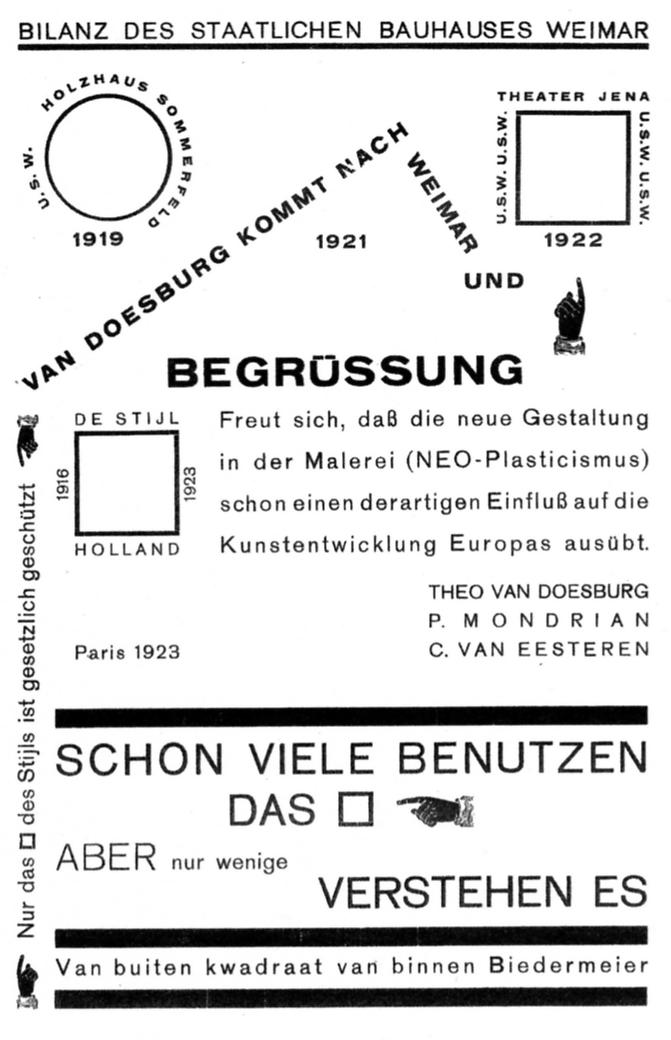
Bauhaus-style typography, Theo van Doesburg (1923)

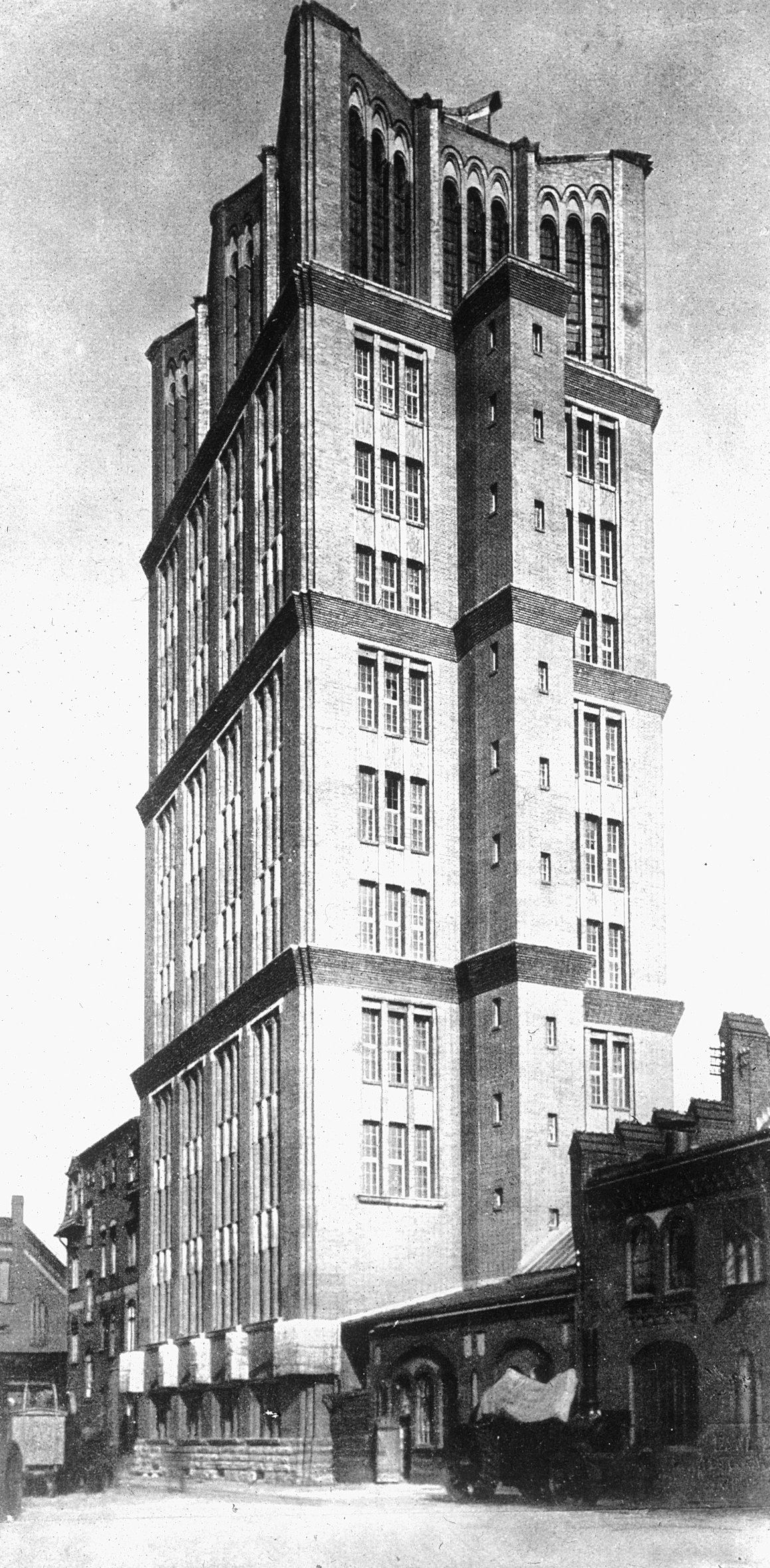
A highrise of the German Borsig company, made in the spirit of brick expressionism by Eugen Schmohl (1922–1924). It still stands in the Tegel district of Berlin.

=== Literature ===
Writers such as Alfred Döblin, Erich Maria Remarque, and the brothers Heinrich and Thomas Mann presented a bleak look at the world and the failure of politics and society through literature. Foreign writers also travelled to Berlin, lured by the city's dynamic, freer culture. The decadent cabaret scene of Berlin was documented by Britain's Christopher Isherwood, such as in his novel Goodbye to Berlin which was later adapted as the play I Am a Camera.

Eastern religions such as Buddhism were becoming more accessible in Berlin during the era, as Indian and East Asian musicians, dancers, and even visiting monks came to Europe. Hermann Hesse embraced Eastern philosophies and spiritual themes in his novels.

Cultural critic Karl Kraus, with his brilliantly controversial magazine Die Fackel, advanced the field of satirical journalism, becoming the literary and political conscience of this era.

Weimar Germany also saw the publication of some of the world's first openly gay literature. In 1920 Erwin von Busse published a collection of stories about sexually charged encounters between men and it was promptly censored. Other authors of such material include Klaus Mann, Anna Elisabet Weirauch, Christa Winsloe, Erich Ebermayer, and Max René Hesse.

=== Theatre ===
The theatres of Berlin and Frankfurt am Main were graced with drama by Ernst Toller, Bertolt Brecht, cabaret, and stage direction by Max Reinhardt and Erwin Piscator. Many theatre works were sympathetic towards Marxist themes, or were overt experiments in propaganda, such as the agitprop theatre by Brecht and Weill. Agitprop theatre is named through a combination of the words "agitation" and "propaganda". Its aim was to add elements of public protest (agitation) and persuasive politics (propaganda) to the theatre, in the hope of creating a more activist audience. Among other works, Brecht and Kurt Weill collaborated on the musical or opera The Threepenny Opera (1928), also filmed, which remains a popular evocation of the period.

Toller was the leading German expressionist playwright of the era. He later became one of the leading proponents of New Objectivity in the theatre. The avant-garde theater of Bertolt Brecht and Max Reinhardt in Berlin was the most advanced in Europe, being rivaled only by that of Paris.

The Weimar years saw a flourishing of political and grotesque cabaret which, at least for the English-speaking world, has become iconic for the period through works such as The Berlin Stories by the English writer Christopher Isherwood, who lived in Berlin from 1929-33. The musical and then the film Cabaret were based upon Isherwood's misadventures at Nollendorfstrasse 17 in the Schöneberg district where he lived with cabaret singer Jean Ross. The main center for political cabaret was Berlin, with performers like comedian Otto Reutter. Karl Valentin was a master of grotesque cabaret.

Historian Peter Jelavich has written extensively about minstrelsy in the Weimar cabaret. In his book Berlin Cabaret he writes that in 1920s Germany "blacks became symbols of a radically new cultural sensibility" and that the reception of minstrelsy in the revue cemented in the idea in Germany that "the United States was both the most modern and the most 'primitive' of nations."

=== Music ===
Concert halls heard the atonal and modern music of Alban Berg, Arnold Schoenberg, and Kurt Weill. Hanns Eisler and Paul Dessau were other modernist composers of the era. Richard Strauss, in his 50s at the start of the period, continued to compose, his work mostly operas including Intermezzo (1924) and Die ägyptische Helena (1928).

=== Modern dance ===
Rudolf von Laban and Mary Wigman laid the foundations for the development of contemporary dance.

=== Cinema ===
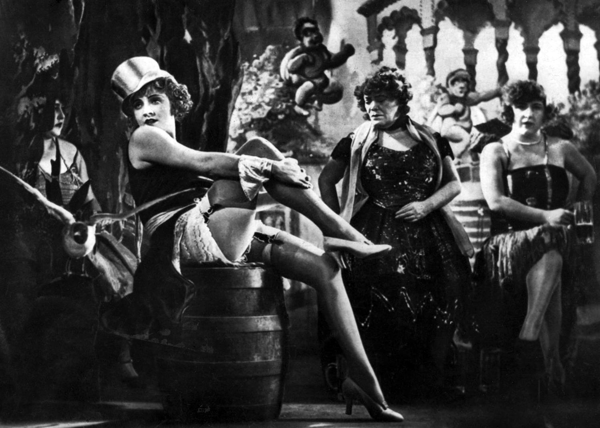
The Blue Angel (1930) was directed by Josef von Sternberg.

At the beginning of the Weimar era, cinema meant silent films. Expressionist films featured plots exploring the dark side of human nature. They had elaborate expressionist design sets, and the style was typically nightmarish in atmosphere. The Cabinet of Dr. Caligari (1919), directed by Robert Wiene, is usually credited as the first German expressionist film. The sets depict distorted, warped-looking buildings in a German town, while the plot centres around a mysterious, magical cabinet that has a clear association with a casket. F. W. Murnau's vampire horror film Nosferatu was released in 1922. Fritz Lang's Dr. Mabuse the Gambler (1922) was described as "a sinister tale" that portrays "the corruption and social chaos so much in evidence in Berlin and more generally, according to Lang, in Weimar Germany". Futurism is another favourite expressionist theme, shown corrupted into a force of oppression in the dystopia of Metropolis (1927). The self-deluded lead characters in many expressionist films echo Goethe's Faust, and Murnau indeed retold the tale in his film Faust.

German expressionism was not the dominant type of popular film in Weimar Germany and were outnumbered by the production of costume dramas, often about folk legends, which were enormously popular with the public. The Weimar era's most groundbreaking film studio was the UFA studio.

Silent films continued to be made throughout the 1920s, in parallel with the early years of sound films during the final years of the Weimar Republic. Silent films had certain advantages for filmmakers, such as the ability to hire an international cast, since spoken accents were irrelevant. Thus, American and British actors were easily able to collaborate with German directors and cast-members on films made in Germany (for example, the collaborations of Georg Pabst and Louise Brooks). When sound films started being produced in Germany, some filmmakers experimented with versions in more than one language, filmed simultaneously.

A scene from Different from the Others (1919), a film made in Berlin, whose main character struggles with his homosexuality

When the musical The Threepenny Opera was filmed by director Georg Pabst, he filmed the first version with a French-speaking cast (1930), then a second version with a German-speaking cast (1931). An English version was planned but never materialized. The Nazis destroyed the original negative print of the German version in 1933, and it was reconstructed after the War ended. The Blue Angel (1930), directed by Josef von Sternberg with the leads played by Marlene Dietrich and Emil Jannings, was filmed simultaneously in English and German (a different supporting cast was used for each version). Although it was based on a 1905 story written by Heinrich Mann, the film is often seen as topical in that it depicts the doomed romance between a Berlin professor and a cabaret dancer. However, critics differ on this interpretation, with the absence of modern urban amenities such as automobiles being noted.

Cinema in Weimar culture did not shy away from controversial topics, but dealt with them explicitly. Diary of a Lost Girl (1929) directed by Georg Wilhelm Pabst and starring Louise Brooks, deals with a young woman who is thrown out of her home after having an illegitimate child, and is then forced to become a prostitute to survive. This trend of dealing frankly with provocative material in cinema began immediately after the end of the War. In 1919, Richard Oswald directed and released two films, that met with press controversy and action from police vice investigators and government censors. Prostitution dealt with women forced into white slavery, while Different from the Others dealt with a homosexual man's conflict between his sexuality and social expectations; and in October 1920 censors ended its release to the public. By the end of the decade, similar material met with little, if any opposition when it was released in Berlin theatres. William Dieterle's Sex in Chains (1928), and Pabst's Pandora's Box (1929) deal with homosexuality among men and women, respectively, and were not censored. Homosexuality was also present more tangentially in other films from the period.

== Philosophy ==
Philosophy during the Weimar Republic pursued paths of enquiry into scientific fields such as mathematics and physics. Leading scientists became associated as a group that was called the Berlin Circle. Among many influential thinkers, Carl Hempel was a strong influence in the group. Born in Berlin, Hempel attended the University of Göttingen and the University of Heidelberg, then returned to Berlin, where he was taught by influential physicists Hans Reichenbach and Max Planck, and logistics with mathematician John von Neumann. Reichenbach introduced Hempel to the Vienna Circle, who were an existing informal association of "scientifically interested philosophers and philosophically interested scientists", as Hempel put it. Hempel was intrigued by the logical positivism ideas discussed by the Vienna Circle, and he developed a similar network, the Berlin Circle. Hempel's reputation has grown to the extent that he is now considered one of the leading scientific philosophers of the 20th century. Richard von Mises was active in both groups.

Germany's most influential philosopher during the Weimar Republic years, and perhaps of the 20th century, was Martin Heidegger. Heidegger published one of the cornerstones of 20th-century philosophy during this period, Being and Time (1927). Being and Time influenced successive generations of philosophers in Europe and the United States, particularly in the areas of phenomenology, existentialism, hermeneutics, and deconstruction. Heidegger's work built on, and responded to, the earlier explorations of phenomenology by another Weimar era philosopher, Edmund Husserl.

The intersection of politics and philosophy inspired other philosophers in Weimar Germany, when radical politics included many thinkers and activists across the political spectrum. During his 20s, Herbert Marcuse was a student in Freiburg, where he went to study under Martin Heidegger, one of Germany's most prominent philosophers. Marcuse himself later became a driving force in the New Left in the United States. Ernst Bloch, Max Horkheimer, and Walter Benjamin all wrote about Marxism and politics in addition to other philosophical topics. From the perspective of Jewish philosophers in Germany, they also considered the problems posed by the "Jewish question". Political philosophers Leo Strauss and Hannah Arendt received their university education during the Weimar Republic and moved in Jewish intellectual circles in Berlin, and were associated with Norbert Elias, Leo Löwenthal, Karl Löwith, Julius Guttmann, Hans-Georg Gadamer, Franz Rosenzweig, Gershom Scholem, and Alexander Altmann. Strauss and Arendt, along with Marcuse and Benjamin, were among the Jewish intellectuals who managed to flee the Nazi regime, eventually emigrating to the United States. Carl Schmitt, a legal and political scholar, was also a vocal fascist supporter of both the Nazi regime and Spain's Franco; however, he published works of political philosophy that remained studied by philosophers and political scholars with radically different views, such as Alain Badiou, Slavoj Žižek, and his contemporaries Hannah Arendt, Walter Benjamin, and Leo Strauss.

== Health and self-improvement ==
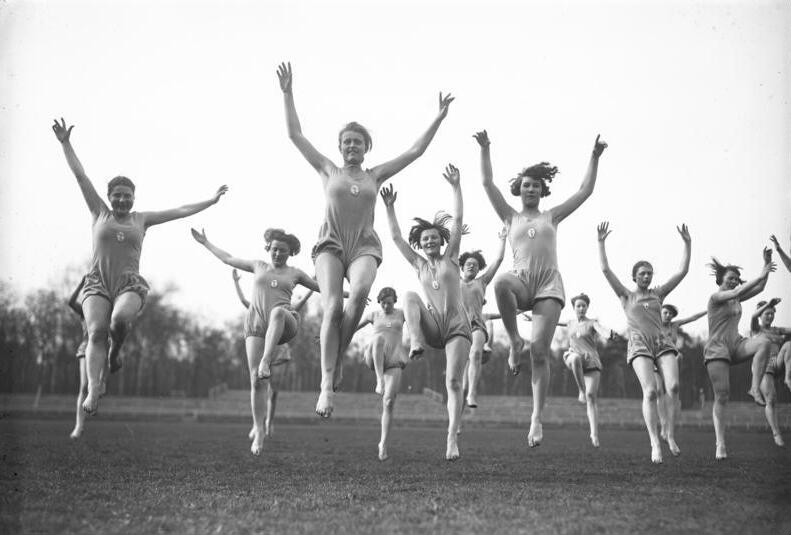
Students at a boarding school in Hanover, beginning each day with 8 o'clock rhythmic dancing and jumping exercises, 1931

Germany had many innovators in health treatment, some more questionable than others, in the decades leading up to World War I. As a group, they were collectively known as part of the Lebensreform, or Life Reform, movement. During the Weimar years, some of these found traction with the German public, particularly in Berlin.

Some innovations had lasting influence. Joseph Pilates developed much of his Pilates system of physical training during the 1920s. Expressionist dance teachers such as Rudolf Laban had an important impact on Pilates' theories.

Nacktkultur, called naturism or modern nudism in English, was pioneered by Karl Wilhelm Diefenbach in Vienna in the late 1890s. Resorts for naturists were established at a rapid pace along the northern coast of Germany during the 1920s, and by 1931, Berlin itself had 40 naturists' societies and clubs. A variety of periodicals on the topic were also regularly published.

Philosopher Rudolf Steiner, like Diefenbach, was a follower of Theosophy. Steiner had an enormous influence on the alternative health movement before his death in 1925 and far beyond. With Ita Wegman, he developed anthroposophical medicine. The integration of spirituality and homeopathy is controversial and has been criticized for having no basis in science.

Steiner was also an early proponent of organic agriculture, in the form of a holistic concept later called biodynamic agriculture. In 1924 he delivered a series of public lectures on the topic, which were then published.

Aufklärungsfilme (enlightenment films) supported the idea of teaching the public about important social problems, such as alcohol and drug addiction, venereal disease, homosexuality, prostitution, and prison reform.

== Status of homosexuality ==
Weimar Germany experienced an increase in the vocalization and congregation of the homosexual community, partially due to the leniency of federal censorship. The period marked an influx in lesbian and gay media as publishers took advantage of ambiguously-worded censorship laws in the Weimar Constitution. Then, in 1921, the German Reichsgericht ruled that homosexual themes in press were not necessarily obscene unless erotic in nature.

Gay magazines disseminated meeting spots for homosexuals to gather and enabled the formation of clubs referred to as "friendship leagues." Some of these leagues would eventually integrate with the German League for Human Rights.

Weimar-era Germany also witnessed the emergence of the world’s first lesbian magazine, Die Freundin. Although there were at least five lesbian magazines available at the time to more than one million readers across German-speaking countries, Die Freundin was the most popular. Published from 1924 to 1933, the magazine featured short stories as well as information about lesbian meetings and nightspots before it was ultimately shut down after the Nazis rose to power.

In 1928, the first guide to the lesbian club scene was published by Ruth Roellig entitled “Ruth Roellig’s Berlins lesbische Frauen (Berlin’s Lesbian Women).” This guide allowed women in Berlin to connect and learn more about the lesbian community.

Despite the illegality of homosexuality during this time period, references to homosexual relationships in cinema grew substantially. Two well-known films from Weimar Germany that centered around homosexual relationships are Anders als die Andern (Different from the Others), which centered around a relationship between two men, and Mädchen in Uniform (Girls in Uniform), which focused on a lesbian relationship between a teacher and student. Both of these films received positive critical reviews and were commercial hits, opening in Berlin’s top theatres. Despite the positive reviews, there was still public outcry over Anders als die Andern, including riots at the cinemas where it opened, and it was even banned in various theatres including in Munich, Vienna, and Stuttgart.

== Berlin's reputation for decadence ==
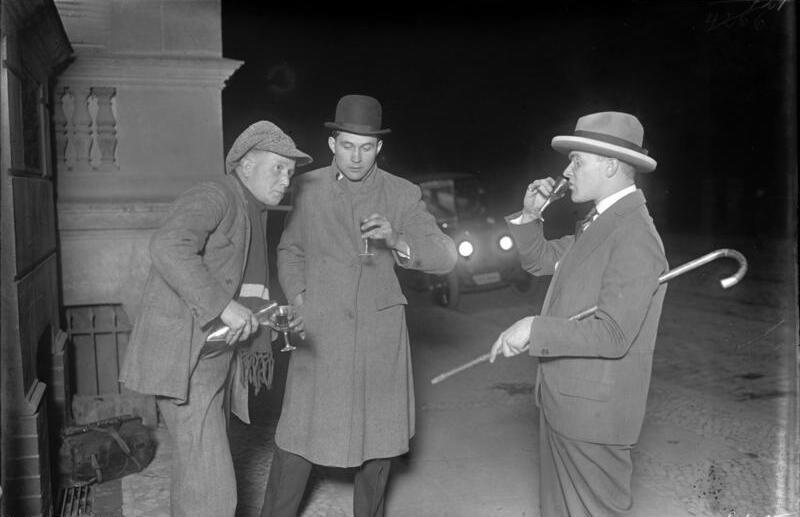
A liquor-seller after closing time on the road. His activity was illegal and the liquor, which cost one mark per glass, was often of quite dubious origin. The seller constantly changed his location.

Prostitution rose in Berlin and elsewhere in the areas of Europe left ravaged by World War I. This means of survival for desperate women, and sometimes men, became normalized to a degree in the 1920s. During the war, venereal diseases such as syphilis and gonorrhea spread at a rate that warranted government attention. Soldiers at the front contracted these diseases from prostitutes, so the German army responded by granting approval to certain brothels that were inspected by their own medical doctors, and soldiers were rationed coupon books for sexual services at these establishments. Homosexual behaviour was also documented among soldiers at the front. Soldiers returning to Berlin at the end of the War had a different attitude towards their own sexual behaviour than they had a few years previously. Prostitution was frowned on by respectable Berliners, but it continued to the point of becoming entrenched in the city's underground economy and culture. First women with no other means of support turned to the trade, then youths of both genders.

Crime in general developed in parallel with prostitution in the city, beginning as petty thefts and other crimes linked to the need to survive in the war's aftermath. Berlin eventually acquired a reputation as a hub of drug dealing (cocaine, heroin, tranquilizers) and the black market. The police identified 62 organized criminal gangs in Berlin, called Ringvereine. The German public also became fascinated with reports of homicides, especially "lust murders" or Lustmord. Publishers met this demand with inexpensive criminal novels called Krimi, which like the film noir of the era (such as the classic M), explored methods of scientific detection and psychosexual analysis.

Apart from the new tolerance for behaviour that was technically still illegal, and viewed by a large part of society as immoral, there were other developments in Berlin culture that shocked many visitors to the city. Thrill-seekers came to the city in search of adventure, and booksellers sold many editions of guide books to Berlin's erotic night entertainment venues. There were an estimated 500 such establishments, that included a large number of homosexual venues for men and for women; sometimes transvestites of one or both genders were admitted, otherwise there were at least 5 known establishments that were exclusively for a transvestite clientele. There were also several nudist venues. Berlin also had a museum of sexuality during the Weimar period, at Dr. Magnus Hirschfeld's Institute of Sexology. These were nearly all closed when the Nazi regime was established in 1933.

Artists in Berlin became fused with the city's underground culture as the borders between cabaret and legitimate theatre blurred. Anita Berber, a dancer and actress, became notorious throughout the city and beyond for her erotic performances (as well as her cocaine addiction and erratic behaviour). She was painted by Otto Dix, and socialized in the same circles as Klaus Mann.

== Gallery of 1920s Berlin cultural life ==
1920s Berlin was a city of many social contrasts. While a large part of the population continued to struggle with high unemployment and deprivations in the aftermath of World War I, the upper class of society, and a growing middle class, gradually rediscovered prosperity and turned Berlin into a cosmopolitan city.

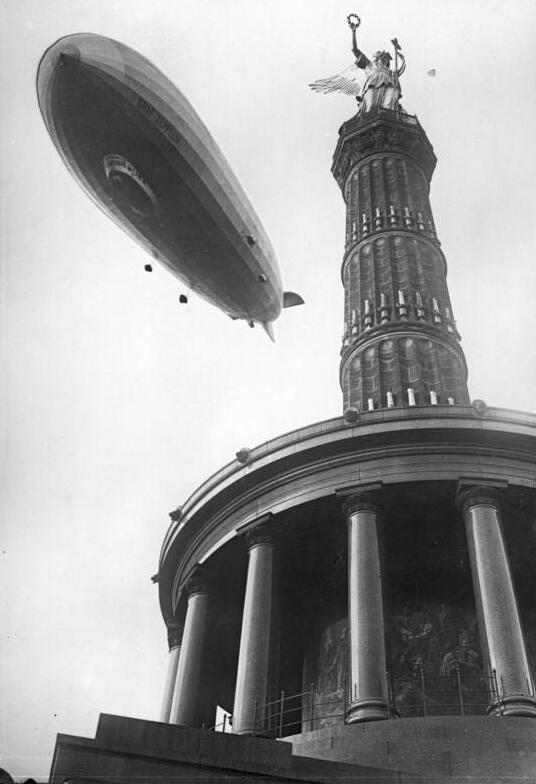
The Graf Zeppelin flies over the Victory Column, 1928

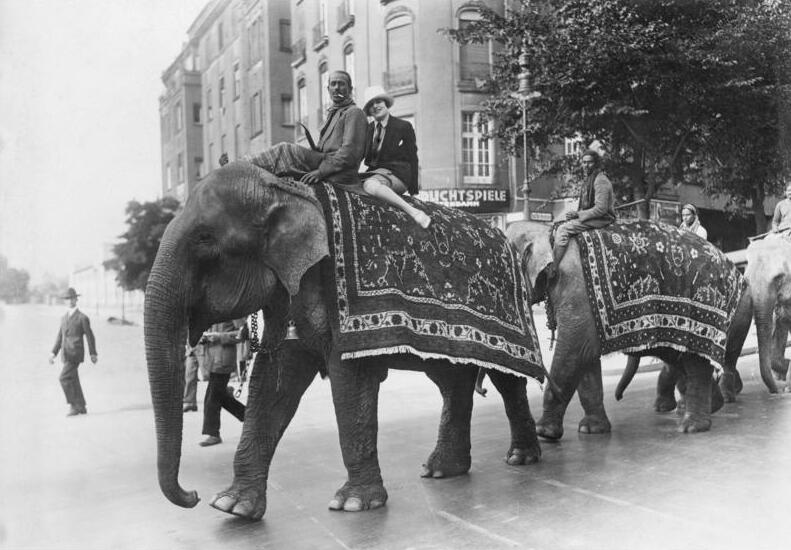
A parade of elephants with Indian trainers from the Hagenbeck show, on their way to the Berlin Zoological Garden, 1926

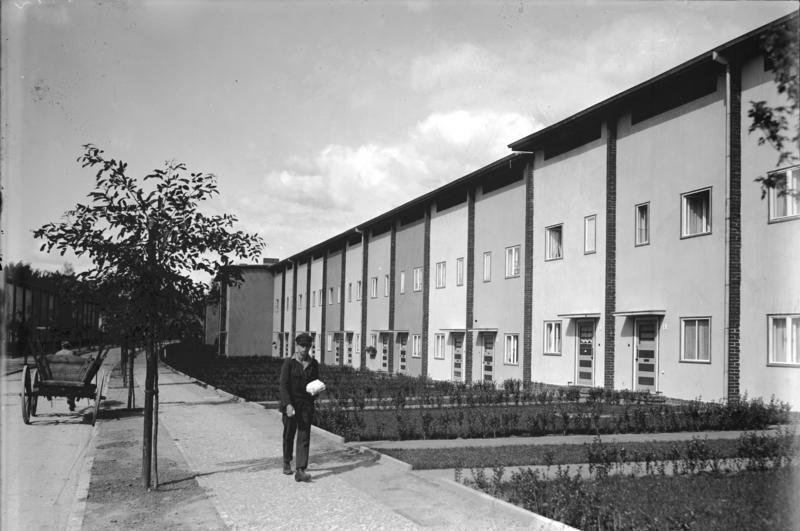
A Neues Bauen (New Building)-style housing development in Berlin-Zehlendorf, 1928

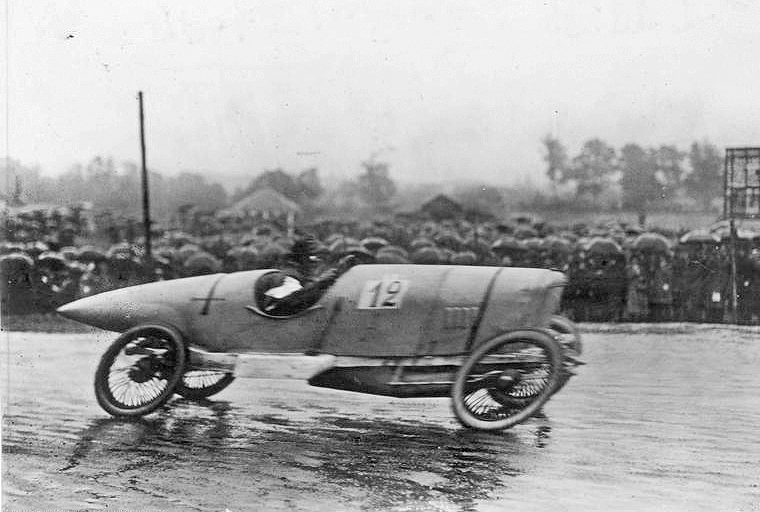
A 1922 autorace in Grunewald, Berlin

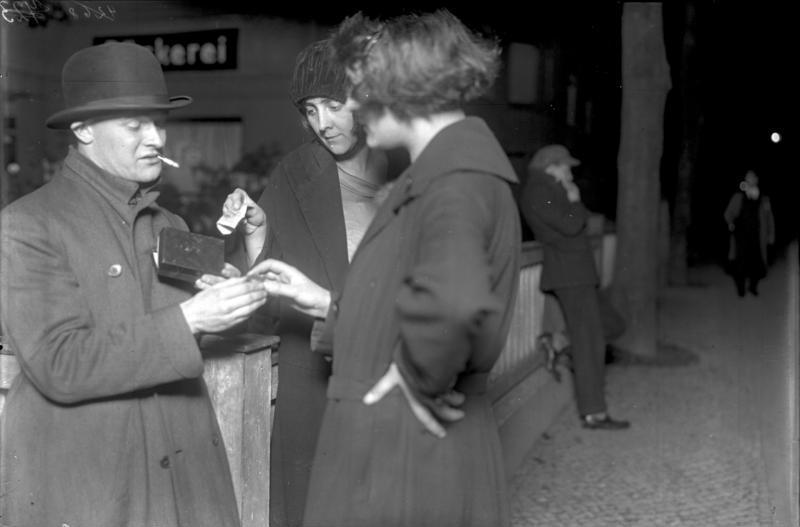
Prostitutes buy cocaine capsules from a drug dealer in Berlin, 1930. The capsules sold for 5 marks each.

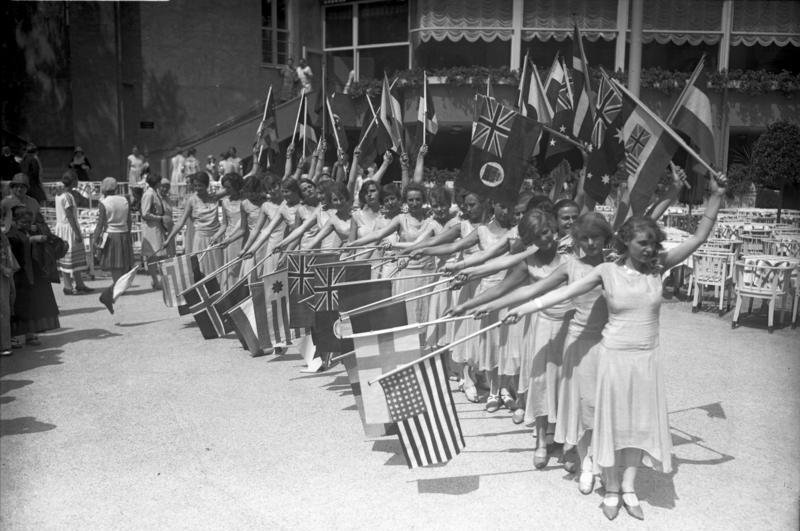
International Women's Union Congress in Berlin, 1929

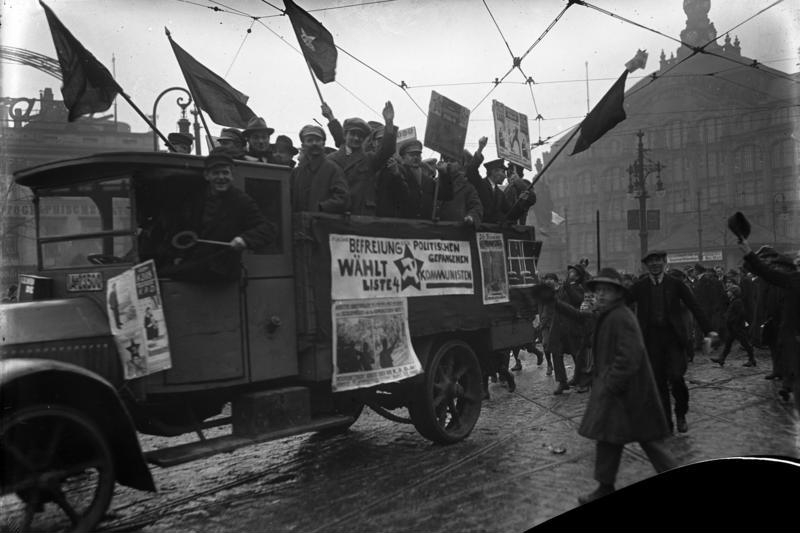
Communist campaigners during the Reichstag elections, 1924

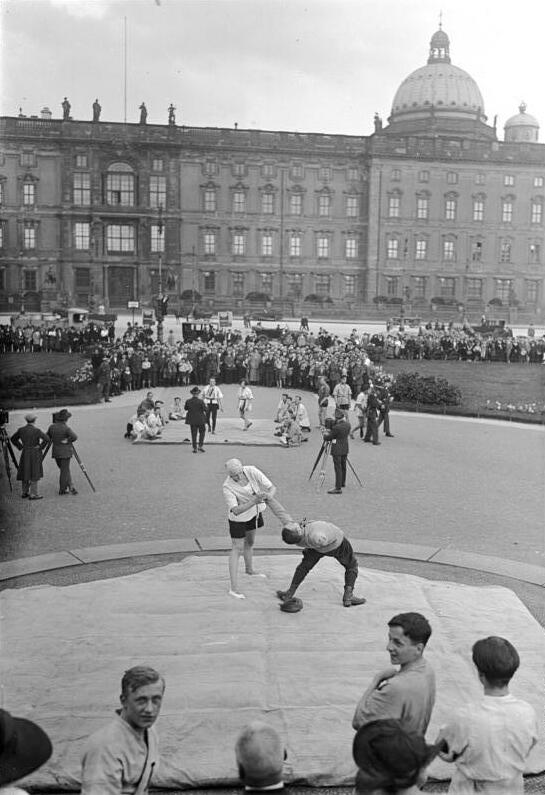
An exhibit of boxing, jiu jitsu, and other sports in the Lustgarten, 1925

== See also ==
- Aftermath of World War I
- Cinema of Germany
- Critical Theory
- Cuba de ayer
- Culture
- Culture of Germany
- Dada
- Degenerate art
- Expressionism
- Futurism
- Germany
- German Expressionism
- Gleichschaltung
- Glitter and Doom - Exhibit of Art in the Weimar Republic
- Glossary of the Weimar Republic
- Golden Twenties
- History of Germany
- Literature of World War I
- Lost Generation
- Modernism
- Nazi Germany
- New Objectivity
- Post-World War I recession
- Post-expressionism
- Reactionary modernism
- Roaring Twenties
- Surrealism
- Weimar Timeline
- Weimaraner

== Bibliography ==
- Becker, Sabina. Neue Sachlichkeit. Köln: Böhlau, 2000. Print.
- Gail Finney (2008) WEIMAR CULTURE: Defeat, the Roaring Twenties, the Rise of Nazism, Courses overview of program The Roaring Twenties in Germany
- Gay, Peter. Weimar Culture: The Outsider as Insider. Westport, Conn.: Greenwood Press, 1981.
- Gordon, Peter E., and John P. McCormick, eds. Weimar Thought: A Contested Legacy (Princeton U.P. 2013) 451 pages; scholarly essays on law, culture, politics, philosophy, science, art and architecture
- Hermand, Jost and Frank Trommler. Die Kultur der Weimarer Republik. Frankfurt am Main: Fischer Taschenbuch Verlag, 1989.
- Huneke, Samuel Clowes (2022). States of Liberation: Gay Men between Dictatorship and Democracy in Cold War Germany. University of Toronto Press. ISBN 978-1-4875-4213-9.
- Jelavich, Peter (2009). Berlin Alexanderplatz: Radio, Film, and the Death of Weimar Culture. Berkeley: University of California Press. ISBN 978-0-520-25997-3.
- Kaes, Anton, Martin Jay, and Edward Dimendberg. The Weimar Republic Sourcebook. Berkeley: University of California Press, 1995.
- Lethen, Helmut. Cool Conduct: The Culture of Distance in Weimar Germany. Berkeley: University of California Press, 2002.
- Lindner, Martin. Leben in der Krise. Zeitromane der neuen Sachlichkeit und die intellektuelle Mentalität der klassischen Moderne. Stuttgart: Metzler, 1994.
- Martin Mauthner: German Writers in French Exile, 1933–1940, London: 2007; ISBN 9780853035404.
- Peukert, Detlev. The Weimar Republic: the Crisis of Classical Modernity. New York: Hill and Wang, 1992.
- Schrader, Barbel. "The 'Golden' Twenties: Art and Literature in the Weimar Republic". Yale University Press, 1988, p. 25-27.
- Schütz, Erhard H. Romane Der Weimarer Republik. München: W. Fink, 1986. Print.
- Peter Selz (2004) Beyond the Mainstream: Fifty years of Curating Modern and Contemporary Art. lectures delivered at Duke University, 10 September 2004.
- Weitz, Eric D. Weimar Germany: Promise and Tragedy. Princeton, N.J: Princeton University Press, 2007. Print.
- Willett, John. Art and Politics in the Weimar Period: The New Sobriety, 1917–1933. 1st ed. New York: Pantheon Books, 1978. Print.
