= Günter Meyer =

German Geographer and Orientalist

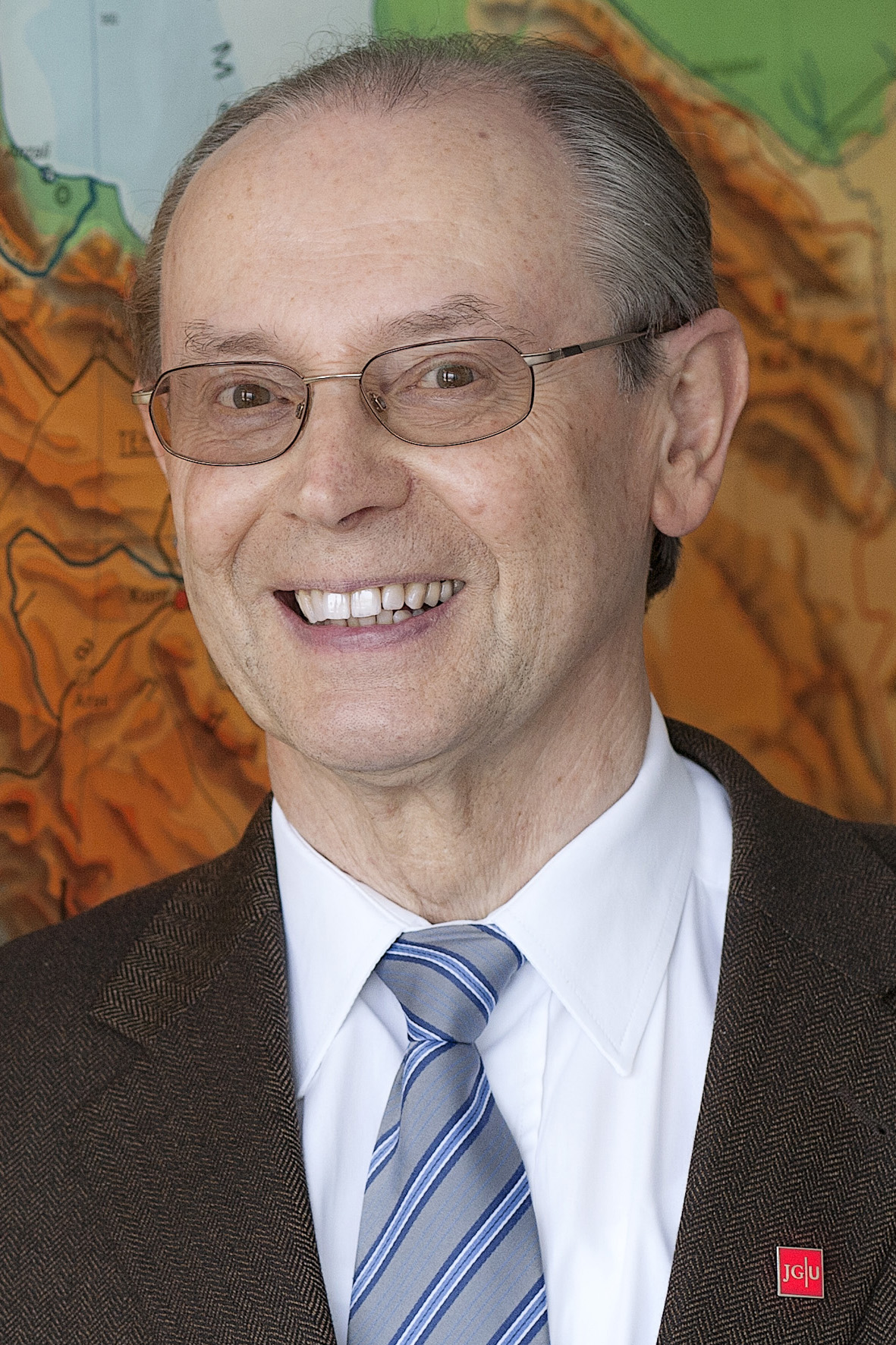
Günter Meyer

Günter Meyer (born 25 August 1946) is a German Geographer and Orientalist. He is chairman of the World Congress for Middle Eastern Studies (WOCMES) and director of the Center for Research on the Arab World (CERAW) at the University of Mainz. Meyer focuses mainly on the Political Geography of the Arab World, and the economic as well as urban development in the Middle East, especially in Egypt, Syria, Yemen and the UAE, but also in Germany. He became known to a wider German-speaking audience through more than 1100 interviews on the Iraq War, the Syrian Civil War and on the Libyan Civil War 2011 and 2014.

== Scientific career ==
Meyer studied Geography and English Literature from 1968 to 1973 at the University of Erlangen–Nuremberg and the New University of Ulster in Northern Ireland. Back in Erlangen, he took his state exams for higher secondary education in 1973, completed his doctorate in Geography in 1976 and qualified as a university lecturer in 1983 with his post-doctoral thesis and other writings in social geographic studies on developments in rural and nomadic areas. He was appointed Professor in Erlangen. In 1993 he changed to the University of Mainz.

Since the mid-1990s he started an intense networking activity organizing the cooperation of Institutes of Oriental studies and orientalists on a national, European and global level.

He headed the first World Congress on Studies of the Middle East in 2002 (WOCMES) in Mainz. The congress attracted about 2.100 scientists from 68 countries, and 126 journalists from all parts of the world.

In 2010 the executive board of WOCMES appointed Meyer again for president. In 2018 he was reelected unanimously for a fifth term of office, until 2022.

In 2014 he was awarded the Jere L. Bacharach Service Award by the Middle East Studies Association of North America (MESA). Meyer was the first European honoured with this award. The award certificate mentioned Meyer's tireless efforts to improve communication and interaction between previously separated, different areas of European scholarship: "This award honors his vision and skill in establishing new institutional networks to the benefit of scholars around the world."

As the chairman of the World Congress of Middle Eastern Studies, Meyer was also in charge of the world congresses in Amman/Jordan, in Barcelona, and in Ankara in August 2014, and is in charge of the congress in Sevilla in 2018.

== Positions ==
=== War in Syria ===
As early as 2012 Meyer attracted attention putting forward his view on the external roots of the conflicts within Syria. He saw a massive and abusive outside interference into inner-Syrian affairs. Western powers seemed to be mainly concerned with extinguishing the "Iran-Hezbollah axis". According to Meyer, thousands of mujaheddin had been flown in, because the CIA was intending to initiate a civil war to weaken Syria. The media were ignoring the fact, Meyer said, that the majority of the population was still preferring Assad as head of government.

With regard to the Civil War in Syria Meyer, from the very beginning expressed himself against all endeavors to remove president Bashar al-Assad from office. Before the Russian military intervention, he expressed a rather positive view on the Russian role in the conflict.

Meyer has repeatedly blamed US foreign politics towards Iraq as a main reason for the emergence of Daesh: "Without acting against International Law, without the wrong decision taken by Bremer, and without consciously accepting that a Salafi territory might emerge in Syria's eastern parts, with the CIA even considering giving support, it would have never been possible for ISIS to develop into a global threat."

Warning of the results of a power vacuum should Assad be removed, he referred to a widely known slogan in Syria: "Christians to Lebanon, the Alawites to the grave" to emphasise the imminent dangers for people protected by the existing state structure.

In February 2016 Meyer presented his view on plans to depose Assad as early as 2001. In 2006 news had been leaked, that the regime should be "destabilized" by instigating ethnic antagonism. The strategy of supplying weapons the so-called temperate rebel opposition via Libya and Turkey had faltered, because, according to Meyer, those rebels had allied themselves with extremist forces. Turkey was supporting IS willing to do everything possible to prevent the emergence of a Kurdish state. Deposing Assad would cause chaos in Syria, to the sole advantage of extremists. Meyer saw the politics of Russia towards Syria as constructive, he ruled out the possibility of Russia's intentionally intensifying immigration towards Europe. The target of the Russian government was getting back control of part of the country.

In a public debate in June 2016 Meyer expressed doubts about a smooth transition of power in case the Assad regime was dissolved. Two military groups, Al-Nusra and IS, could not have a share in power, also the remaining militias had a salafist or radically islamistic outlook, often hostile against each other, only united temporarily by their common enmity towards Assad.

== Functions and memberships ==
- Guest professor and member of the board of trustees of Sharjah University, UAE.
- President of the Zentrums für Forschung zur Arabischen Welt (ZEFAW)
- Chairman of the Deutsche Arbeitsgemeinschaft Vorderer Orient für gegenwartsbezogene Forschung und Dokumentation (DAVO)
- President of the European Association for Middle Eastern Studies (EURAMES)
- President of the International Association for Middle Eastern Studies (IAMES)
- Chairman of the International Advisory Council of the World Congress of Middle Eastern Studies (WOCMES)
- Member of the board of the "Parliament of Cultures"
- Chairman of the Geographie für Alle e.V. (Geography for all association)
- Speaker of the Interdisziplinärer Arbeitskreis Dritte Welt (interdisciplinary 3rd world workshop)
- Chairman of the Alumni-Vereinigung Geographie der Universität Mainz (association of Geography students)

== Awards ==
- 2002: Verdienstorden des Landes Rheinland-Pfalz for his commitment as a president of the first world congress for studies of the Middle East in Mainz.
- 2014: Jere L. Bacharach Service Award for the interlinking of international orientalist research. The award is regarded as the most prestigious distinction in Oriental Studies

== Private life ==
Günter Meyer is married and the father of two daughters, one of them the German cabaret artist Inka Meyer.

== Bibliography ==
- Sozialgeograph. Studien zur Entwicklung im bäuerlichen und nomadischen Lebensraum (= Erlanger geographischen Arbeiten. Sonderband 16). Fränkische Geographische Ges. Palm und Enke, Erlangen 1984, ISBN 3-920405-58-7 (325 S., post-doctoral thesis).
- Arbeitsemigration, Binnenwanderung und Wirtschaftsentwicklung in der Arabischen Republik Jemen. Eine wirtschafts- und bevölkerungsgeographische Studie unter besonderer Berücksichtigung des städtischen Bausektors. In: Jemen-Studien. Band 2. Reichert, Wiesbaden 1986, ISBN 3-88226-292-3.
- Die Arabische Welt. Im Spiegel der Kulturgeographie. Vol. 11. Zentrum für Forschung zur Arabischen Welt [et al.], Mainz 2004, ISBN 3-88250-330-0.
- with Christian Steiner, Ala Al-Hamarneh: "Krisen, Kriege, Katastrophen und ihre Auswirkungen auf den Tourismusmarkt." In: Zeitschrift für Wirtschaftsgeographie. Vol. 50, Nr. 1, October 2006, ISSN 0044-3751, p. 98–108, doi:10.1515/zfw.2006.0011.
- with Andreas Thimm (Hrsg.): Die globale Nahrungsmittelkrise: Gewinner und Verlierer in den Entwicklungsländern (= Veröffentlichungen des Interdisziplinären Arbeitskreises Dritte Welt. vol 20). Interdisziplinärer Arbeitskreis Dritte Welt, Mainz 2010, ISBN 978-3-88250-339-5.
- with Andreas Thimm (ed.): Wirtschaftliche und soziale Folgen der Finanzkrise für die Entwicklungsländer (= Veröffentlichungen des Interdisziplinären Arbeitskreises Dritte Welt. Band 21). Interdisziplinärer Arbeitskreis Dritte Welt, Mainz 2011, ISBN 978-3-88250-340-1.
- with Evelyn Schäfer: Studierende in Mainz – Wohnen, Konsum und Freizeit in der Landeshauptstadt. Geographisches Institut der Johannes Gutenberg-Universität Mainz, 2011, June 20, 2016.

== Links ==
- staff at Mainz University:
- Asia Times Online-Interview in Englisch on Syrien 2012:
- Interview with FAZ on Syria and Russia 2015: FAZ
- Interview on Syria 2016: youtube.com
