= Inland harbor =

An inland harbor (or inland harbour) is a harbor that is distant from the ocean or sea, such as Berlin, Germany, Chicago, Illinois, or Paris, France. Inland harbors are connected to a large body of water by an important river or canal passing near the center of the city.

The Danube in Europe, the Mississippi River in the United States, and the Yangtze River in the People's Republic of China are transportation routes for many cities in each case.

Duisburg on the Rhine is stated as the largest inland harbour in the world.

== US Regulations ==
Title 33 of the United States Code states that an inland harbor is defined as "a navigation project which is used principally for the accommodation of commercial vessels and the receipt and shipment of waterborne cargoes on inland waters."
