= Ringvereine =

Criminal associations in 19th and 20th century Germany

The Ringvereine (English: "Ring clubs", as members identified themselves by wearing a ring) were criminal gangs operating in late 19th- and early 20th-century Germany, notably the Weimar period. Ostensibly convicts associations formed in the 1890s to aid their reintegration to society, the Ringvereine became convenient fronts for illegal activities as well as providing a ready network of underworld contacts. Like the Mafia, these associations also followed certain rules and a code of conduct. Since these groups practiced witness intimidation and members provided alibis for one another, it was difficult to prove their involvement in a crime.

The term emerged for a union with criminal orientation when several clubs by former prisoners joined the holding organization "Ring Berlin". The "Ring-brothers" could be identified by the identical signet rings and were bound to absolute secrecy particularly towards the police. The criminal clubs of the 1920s had poetic names such as "Berliner", "Immertreu" ("ever faithful"), "Libelle" ("Dragonfly"), "Deutsche Eiche" (German oak), or "Apachenblut" ("blood of the Apache"). The members provided each other with alibis and lawyers, supported each other financially and looked after the families of the other members. The union was funded by a charge of the spoils from the organized crimes.

When the Nazis came to power in 1933, they promised to restore law and order and outlawed Ringvereine associations. Nevertheless, despite being banned and the best efforts of the Nazi regime, these organised gangs persisted.
