= Glitter and Doom =

Art exhibit

Glitter and Doom was a Special Exhibit shown at the Metropolitan Museum of Art featuring portrait art of Germany from 1919-1933, between the World Wars when the Weimar Republic was in political power. This Special Exhibit was shown from November 16, 2006 to February 19, 2007.

Life in the Weimar Republic was marked by massive hyperinflation, crippling poverty, and political upheaval. The massive number of orphans and widows without a means of feeding themselves resulted in prostitution on a scale not seen before in Germany. Additionally, the repeal and relaxation of laws forbidding prostitution, homosexuality, and other 'moral vices' led to an explosion of an underground culture, with people enjoying pursuits not available in other European Cities.

Themes of the works include sexual freedom, prostitution, poverty, war profiteering, disfigurement and decay, homosexuality, and transvestites.

The exhibition was organized by Sabine Rewald, Jacques and Natasha Gelman Curator in the Department of Nineteenth-Century, Modern, and Contemporary Art.

The works of this exhibit can be found in the book Glitter and Doom, by Yale University Press.

== Artists shown in the Exhibit ==
- Max Beckmann
- Heinrich Maria Davringhausen
- Otto Dix
- George Grosz
- Karl Hubbuch
- Ludwig Meidner
- Christian Schad
- Rudolf Schlichter
- Georg Scholz
- Gert Heinrich Wollheim
- Brandy Carstens

== In the media ==
- WNYC Public Radio, the Leonard Lopate Show, Monday, January 29th 2007, with mp3 interview featuring Sabine Rewald
