= Zörgiebel =

Zörgiebel is a surname. Notable people with the name include:

- Florian Zörgiebel (born 1965), German curler
- Karl Zörgiebel (1878–1961), German politician and police official
