= Kladderadatsch (band) =

Kladderadatsch is a music group that originated in the Nijmegen student protests and anarchist movement in 1974. The band celebrated their 50th anniversary in 2024 and is the oldest extant street and protest orchestra in the Netherlands. The group's name alludes to the Marxist expression "the great Kladderadatsch", referring to the collapse of capitalism. The name is also an onomatopoeia for noise or chaos, doing double duty as an expression of the activist roots of the group and its diverse and improvisatory repertoire.

The group played a role in large-scale protests against a nuclear reactor in Kalkar, Germany (1979). While its early repertoire mostly consisted of protest songs, many of them self-made, in later decades the group's repertoire was broadened to include music from Latin American, klezmer, Balkan, and West-African genres. The group released four records, including the CD Weids in 2014.

Kladderadatsch regularly collaborates with other groups. In the 1990s they worked with Circus Colourful City and played live venues throughout the Netherlands with the Catching Cultures Orchestra, an initiative pairing up refugee musicians with Dutch performers. Since 2000 they participated in several theatre performances with the Arnhem-based theatre house De Plaats, most recently in 2025. The group has also toured internationally, with performances in Gaziantep, Venice, San Sebastian, Riga, and Hamburg.
