= Berlin Police =

Law enforcement agency in Germany

Berlin Police Polizei Berlin

Agency overview
- Formed: 25 March 1809
- Employees: 27,208 (2023)
- Annual budget: €1.957 billion (2023)

Jurisdictional structure
- Operations jurisdiction: Berlin
- Location of Berlin shown in Germany
- Area: 891.85 km^{2}
- Population: 3,754,418 (2019)
- Governing body: Senate of Berlin
- Constituting instruments: (ASOG Berlin) (Law of the protection of public safety and order); (StPO) (Code of criminal procedure)
- General nature: Local civilian police

Operational structure
- Headquarters: Platz der Luftbrücke 6; 12101 Berlin
- Agency executive: Barbara Slowik, Polizeipräsidentin

Website
- www.berlin.de/polizei/

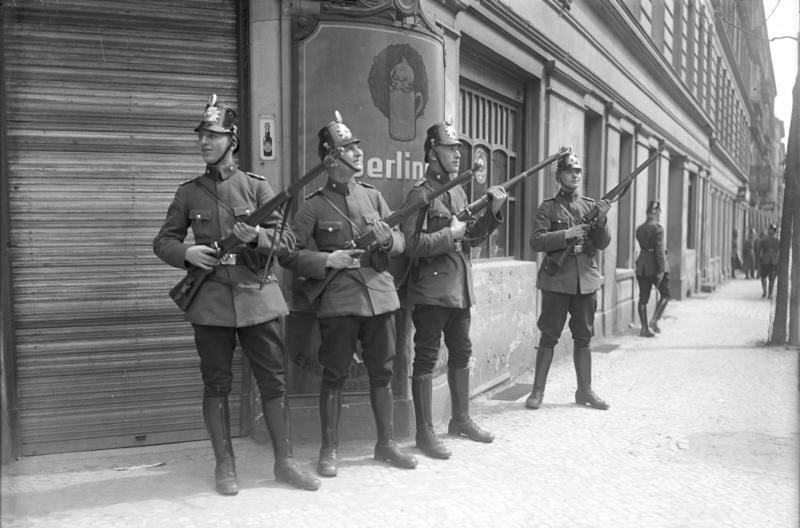
Berlin police during the May 1929 violence known as Blutmai

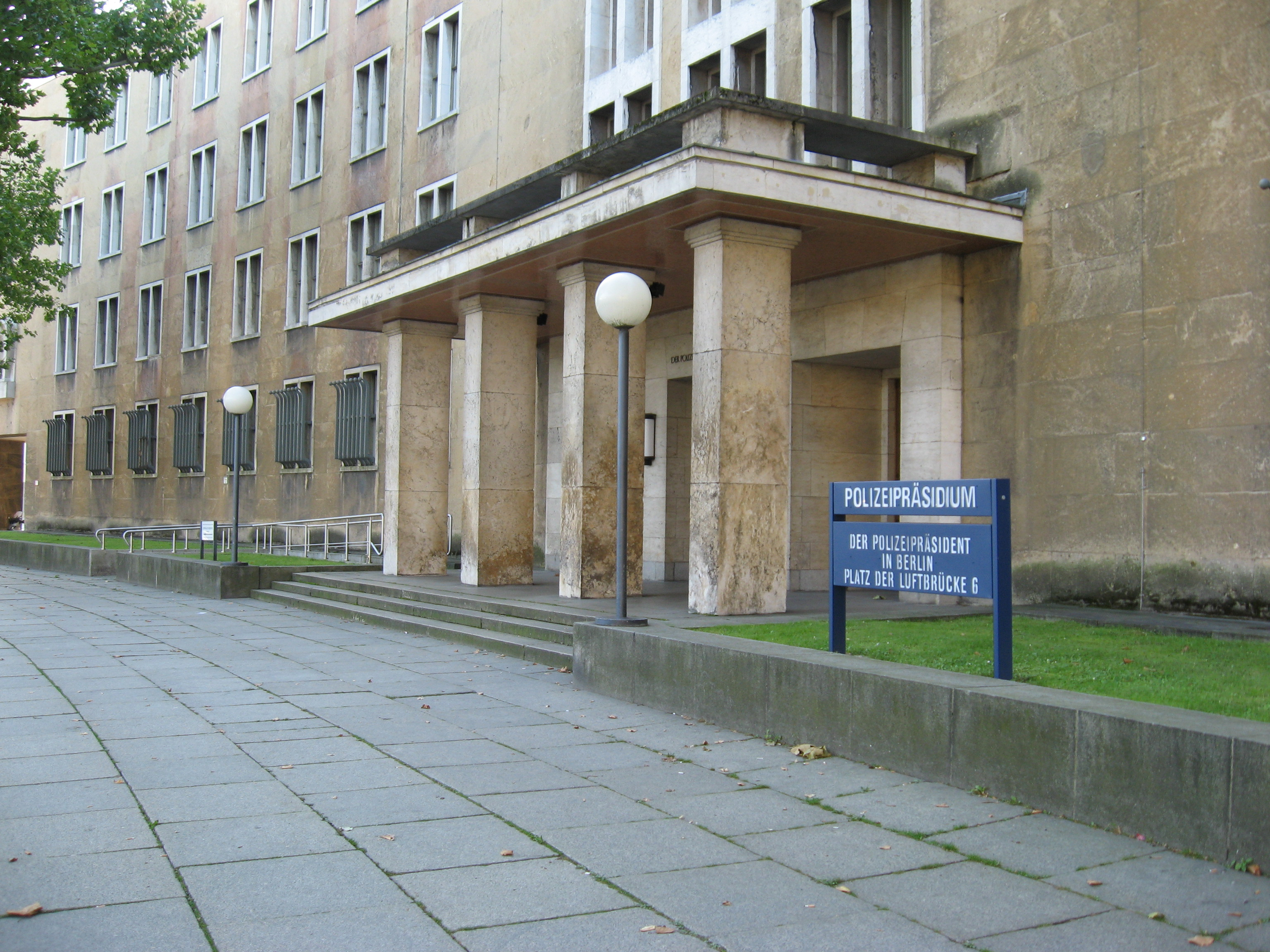
Polizeipräsidium, main entry (2011).

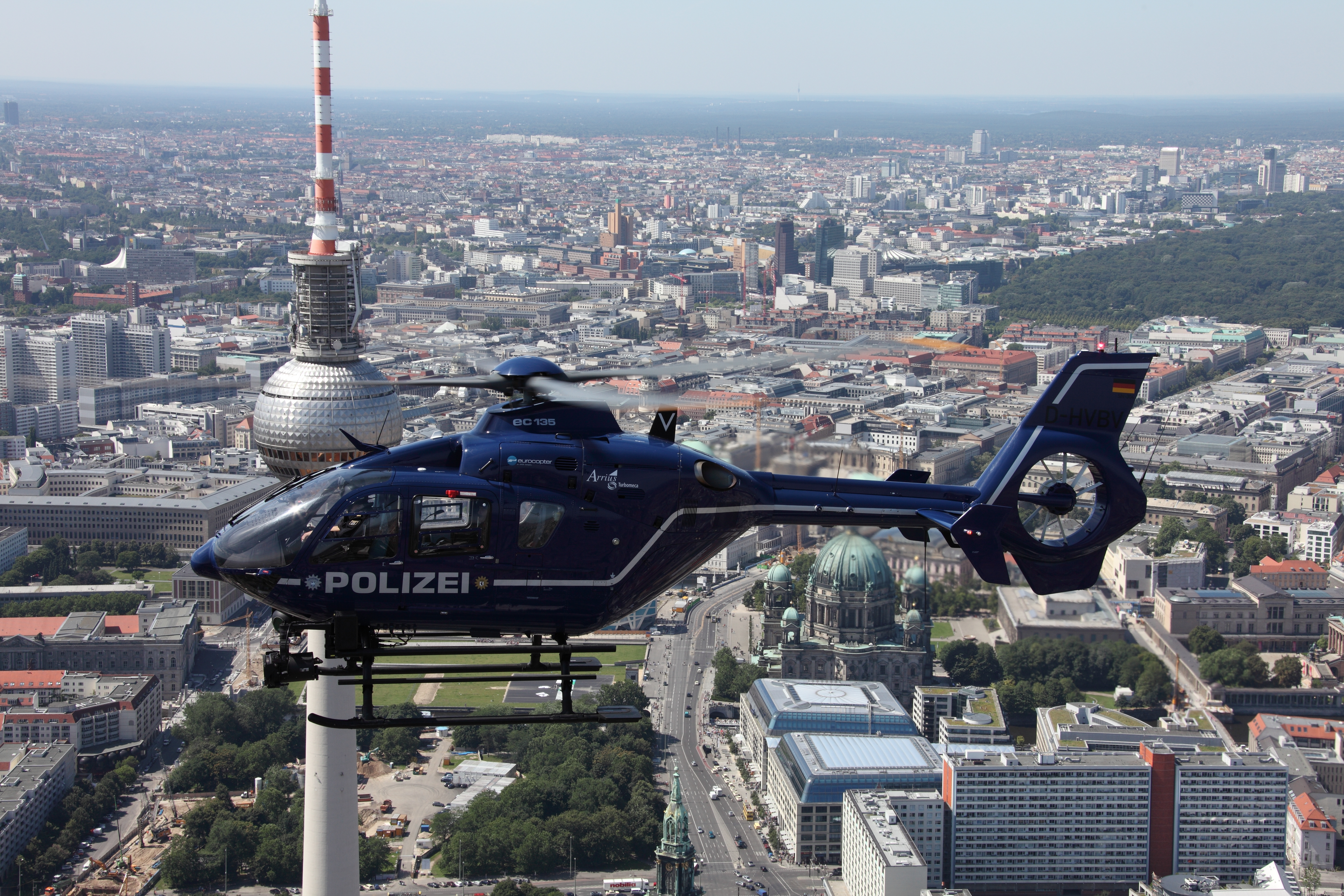
Police helicopter over Berlin (2012).

The Berlin Police (German: Polizei Berlin, lit. 'Police Berlin'; formerly Der Polizeipräsident in Berlin, lit. 'The Police President in Berlin') is the Landespolizei (lit. 'state police') force for the city-state of Berlin, Germany. Law enforcement in Germany is divided between federal and state (Land) agencies.

The Berlin Police is headed by the Polizeipräsident (lit. 'Chief of Police'), Barbara Slowik Meisel. Her Polizeivizepräsident (lit. 'Vice-chief of Police' or 'deputy') is Marco Langner. They are supported in the management of the force by the Staff Office of the Police Chief, the commanders of the five Local Divisions, the Division for Central Tasks, the Criminal Investigation Department, and the Central Services Division and the Academy of Police.

== History ==
The Royal Prussian Police of Berlin was founded on 25 March 1809, with Justus von Gruner as the first chief of police.

In March 1848, Berlin was one of the places where the Revolution of 1848 took place (also called the March Revolution). At this time, just a small number of police officers (approx. 200 officers for 400,000 citizens) with limited authority, the so-called Revierpolizei (lit. ' police station police'), existed. To fight the revolution, the chief of police, police commissioner Dr. Julius Freiherr von Minutoli, asked the Prussian Army for help. They sent two guard cavalry regiments (the Regiment Gardes du Corps cuirassiers, and the 1. Garde-Dragoner Regiment Königin Victoria von Großbritannien und Irland dragoons), and three guard infantry regiments (the 1. und 2. Garderegiment zu Fuss, and the Kaiser Alexander Garde-Grenadier-Regiment Nr.1). Approximately 230 citizens were shot or killed by sabers, because the guard troops had orders to immer feste druff ('transl. strike them hard'). After a couple of days, the troops withdrew and a militia (Bürgerwehr) with a strength of 20,000 men was founded.

Shortly after the revolution, King Frederick William IV of Prussia founded the Königliche Schutzmannschaft zu Berlin in June 1848. It was the first modern police force in Germany from the viewpoint of then and today. It consisted of 1 Oberst (transl. colonel), 5 Hauptleuten (transl. captains), 200 Wachtmeister (transl. sergeants) and 1,800 Schutzleute (transl. officers), 40 of them mounted.

After the German Revolution of 1918-19 at the end of World War I, the police fell under the control of the far-left USPD politician Emil Eichhorn. However, the government of the Free State of Prussia voted to replace him with the Majority Social Democrat Eugen Ernst, an event which led to the Spartacist uprising of 1919. Under the Weimar Republic, the Berlin Police was often more willing to suppress far-left paramilitary groups such as the Communist Party of Germany's Roter Frontkämpferbund than right-wing ones such as the NSDAP's Sturmabteilung (SA) or the German National People's Party's Der Stahlhelm. In the Blutmai violence of 1–3 May 1929, the Berlin Police suppressed a Communist International Workers' Day demonstration, resulting in the deaths of about 30 civilians. After seizing control of Prussia in the 1932 Preußenschlag, Franz von Papen dismissed Police Chief Albert Grzesinski for his Social Democratic loyalties and replaced him with Kurt Melcher, with the political police section falling under the control of Rudolf Diels.

After Adolf Hitler's rise to power and the beginning of the Gleichschaltung in 1933, political dissidents and Jews were dismissed from the service through the Law for the Restoration of the Professional Civil Service. Diels' Berlin political police, as well as other the Prussian Secret Police, were merged into the Gestapo under Hermann Göring's command. Göring also issued an order to police forces in Prussia, including Berlin, recognizing right-wing paramilitaries such as the SS, the SA, and Der Stahlhelm as Hilfspolizei (lit. 'auxiliary police') with authority to help police arrest and harass political dissidents and imprison them in concentration camps. The Berlin Police were placed under the authority of Wolf-Heinrich Graf von Helldorff, a fanatical former SA-Obergruppenführer (transl. Lieutenant-general in the SA). The Nazi regime won the support of the Berlin Police by praising police in official propaganda.

In 1936, the Berlin police force was dissolved, like all other German police forces, and absorbed into the Ordnungspolizei (Orpo; lit. 'Order police'). The Orpo was established as a centralized organisation uniting the municipal, city, and rural uniformed forces that had been organised on a state-by-state basis. Eventually, the Orpo absorbed virtually all of the Third Reich's law enforcement and emergency response organisations, including fire brigades, coast guard, civil defense, and even night watchmen. It was under the overall command of Heinrich Himmler. In Berlin after the passage of Nuremberg Laws, the Berlin Orpo helped segregate Jews through heavy-handed enforcement of traffic laws. They also assisted the SA in the Kristallnacht pogrom.

During the Allied occupation of Berlin, the Soviet Union and the Communist Socialist Unity Party of Germany took control of the Berlin Police, and the politicization of the police led to three-quarters of the police to switch to a new authority in West Berlin. This led to the creation of the West Berlin Police.

Police brutality by East Berlin Police against the Berlin city council and anti-Communist demonstrators in East Berlin led to the formal partition of the city. After the fall of the Berlin Wall (1989) and the reunification of Germany (1990), the West Berlin police, with 20,000 employees, and the East Berlin police, with 12,000 employees, were merged under the direction of the West Berlin chief Georg Schertz. Approximately 2,300 officers changed assignments from the West to the East, and approximately 2,700 from the East to the West. About 9,600 East Berlin officers were checked for being possible collaborators of the MfS (Stasi). 8,544 of them were cleared, while 1,056 were not. Approximately 2,000 were retired or resigned on their own.

The law on the Freiwillige Polizei-Reserve (FPR; lit. 'volunteer police reserve') in Berlin of 25 May 1961 in West Berlin created a paramilitary organisation to protect important infrastructure like power plants and drinking water supplies. Since the 1980s, it became more of a branch in which citizens were able to voluntarily support the Schupo in daily service. It was disbanded in 2002.

== Controversies ==
=== Post-war re-employment of Nazi-era police officers ===
After the end of the Second World War, the Allied authorities formally dissolved the Nazi-era police structures in Berlin and the rest of Germany. In the immediate post-war years, the denazification process removed many former Nazi Party members from public service, including police officers. However, by the early 1950s, political and administrative priorities had shifted toward rapid reconstruction and Cold War security concerns. As a result, large numbers of former Nazi Party members and wartime police personnel were reinstated in the police service.

The re-employment of former Nazis was facilitated by Article 131 of the Basic Law (Grundgesetz), adopted in 1951, which allowed former civil servants dismissed under denazification measures to be rehired into public service. Historical research indicates that by the late 1950s a majority of senior police administrators in West Germany, including those in Berlin's force and in the newly established Federal Criminal Police Office (Bundeskriminalamt), had previously served under the Nazi regime.

A study commissioned by the BKA in 2011 found that over 75 percent of its senior officials during the 1950s were former members of the Nazi Party, SS, or Gestapo. Comparable continuity existed in the Berlin Police, where many officers who had joined before 1945 continued their careers into the post-war decades.

Historians have argued that this personnel continuity hindered democratic reform and contributed to the persistence of authoritarian traditions within German policing. Critics contend that the “zero hour” (Stunde Null) often invoked to mark a clean break with the Nazi past was, in policing institutions, largely symbolic rather than structural.

=== Far-right infiltration and extremist sympathies ===
Since at least the 2010s, police forces in Germany — including those serving the city of Berlin — have been subject to investigations and disciplinary proceedings over alleged far-right extremist views or membership among officers. A 2024 report noted that more than 400 investigations were underway in German state police forces for possible right-wing extremist beliefs or conspiracy ideology. In Berlin specifically, internal records showed investigations of dozens of officers: by 2020, the Berlin police reported about 33 officers under investigation since 2017 for extremist activity (including Nazi salutes) and four dismissal proceedings. In late 2020, the Berlin police chief stated that almost 40 disciplinary proceedings were underway relating to suspected right-wing extremism within the force, and acknowledged the possible dismissal of about twenty officers. These revelations triggered the announcement of an 11-point plan by Berlin's Interior Minister and Police President to strengthen vetting, monitoring and anonymous tip-off systems for extremist behaviour among officers. Critics and oversight bodies argue that even isolated cases of extremist sympathies within police ranks pose a threat to public trust and to the constitutional mandate of the police to protect democratic order.

=== Use of force and policing of protests ===
The policing of demonstrations and public assemblies in Berlin has come under scrutiny from civil society groups, academics and international human-rights monitors. For example, in May 2024, over 100 academics publicly criticised a police operation at Free University of Berlin (FU Berlin) during pro-Palestinian protests, describing the action as a violent clamp-down on peaceful protest. According to the Berlin Citizens’ and Police Commissioner's 2024 annual report, the Ombudsman office logged 784 complaints (8% of which were found justified) about the police, an 83% increase over the previous year, signalling growing public concern about police conduct and transparency.

=== United Nations and international criticism ===
In October 2025, UN human rights experts raised an alarm over Germany's responses to protesters, particularly in Berlin, during Palestinian solidarity activism. They condemned what they described as a “persistent pattern of police violence and apparent suppression” of protest rights, including arbitrary detentions (including of minors) and criminalisation of activism. The UN statement urged German authorities to “respect and facilitate the right to peaceful assembly for everyone without discrimination”.

=== Police chiefs ===
List of police chiefs since 1809:

==== 1809–1920 ====
1809–1811: Justus von Gruner; 1811–1812: Diederich Friedrich Carl von Schlechtendal; 1812–1821: Paul Ludwig Le Coq; 1822–1831: Ludwig Wilhelm von Esebeck; 1831–1832: Friedrich Wilhelm Karl von Arnim; 1832: August Wilhelm Francke; 1832–1839: Karl von Gerlach; 1839–1847: Eugen von Puttkamer; 1847–1848: Julius von Minutoli; 1848: Moritz von Bardeleben; 1848–1856: Karl Ludwig Friedrich von Hinckeldey; 1856–1861: Constantin von Zedlitz-Neukirch	1861–1862: Leopold von Winter; 1862–1867: Otto von Bernuth; 1867–1872: Lothar von Wurmb; 1872–1885: Guido von Madai; 1885–1895: Bernhard von Richthofen; 1895–1902: Ludwig von Windheim; 1903–1908: Georg von Borries; 1908–1909: Ernst von Stubenrauch; 1909–1916: Traugott von Jagow; 1916–1918: Heinrich von Oppen; 1918–1919: Emil Eichhorn; 1919–1920: Eugen Ernst; 1920: Wilhelm Richter

==== Greater Berlin: 1920–1948 ====
1920–1925: Wilhelm Richter; 1925–1926: Albert Grzesinski; 1926–1930: Karl Zörgiebel; 1930–1932: Albert Grzesinski; 1932–1933: Kurt Melcher	1933–1935: Magnus von Levetzow; 1935–1944: Wolf-Heinrich Graf von Helldorff; 1944–1945: Kurt Göhrum; 1945–1948: Paul Markgraf

==== Divided Berlin: 1948–1990 ====
West Berlin: 1948–1962: Johannes Stumm; 1962–1967: Erich Duensing; 1968: Georg Moch; 1969–1987: Klaus Hübner; 1987–1990: Georg Schertz	East Berlin: 1948–1949: Paul Markgraf; 1950–1953: Waldemar Schmidt; 1953–1964: Fritz Eikemeier; 1964–1975: Horst Ende; 1975–1985: Werner Gröning; 1986–1990: Friedhelm Rausch; 1990: Dirk Bachmann

==== Since 1990 ====
1990–1992: Georg Schertz; 1992–2001: Hagen Saberschinsky; 2002–2011: Dieter Glietsch	2011–2012: Margarete Koppers; 2012–2018: Klaus Kandt; from 2018: Dr. Barbara Slowik

== Organisation ==
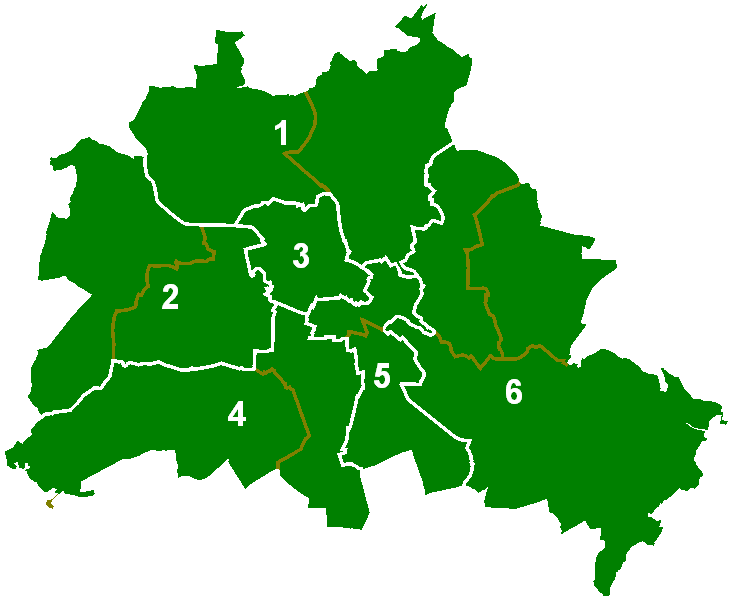
The six Berlin police directorates.

Berlin Police is headed by the Police President and divided into 4 main directorates:

- Berlin Police Directorate
- Criminal Investigation Department
- Police Academy
- Central Services Directorate

=== Berlin Police Directorate ===
Berlin Police Directorate is divided into 5 local directorates (Direktion), one Division Operations/Traffic Management and one Division Central Special Services.

==== Local directorates ====
Each local directorate is responsible for one to three Berliner districts:

- Direktion 1: Reinickendorf, Pankow
- Direktion 2: Spandau, Charlottenburg-Wilmersdorf, Mitte West
- Direktion 3: Marzahn-Hellersdorf, Treptow-Köpenick, Lichtenberg
- Direktion 4: Tempelhof-Schöneberg, Steglitz-Zehlendorf, Neukölln
- Direktion 5: Friedrichshain-Kreuzberg, Neukölln, Mitte East

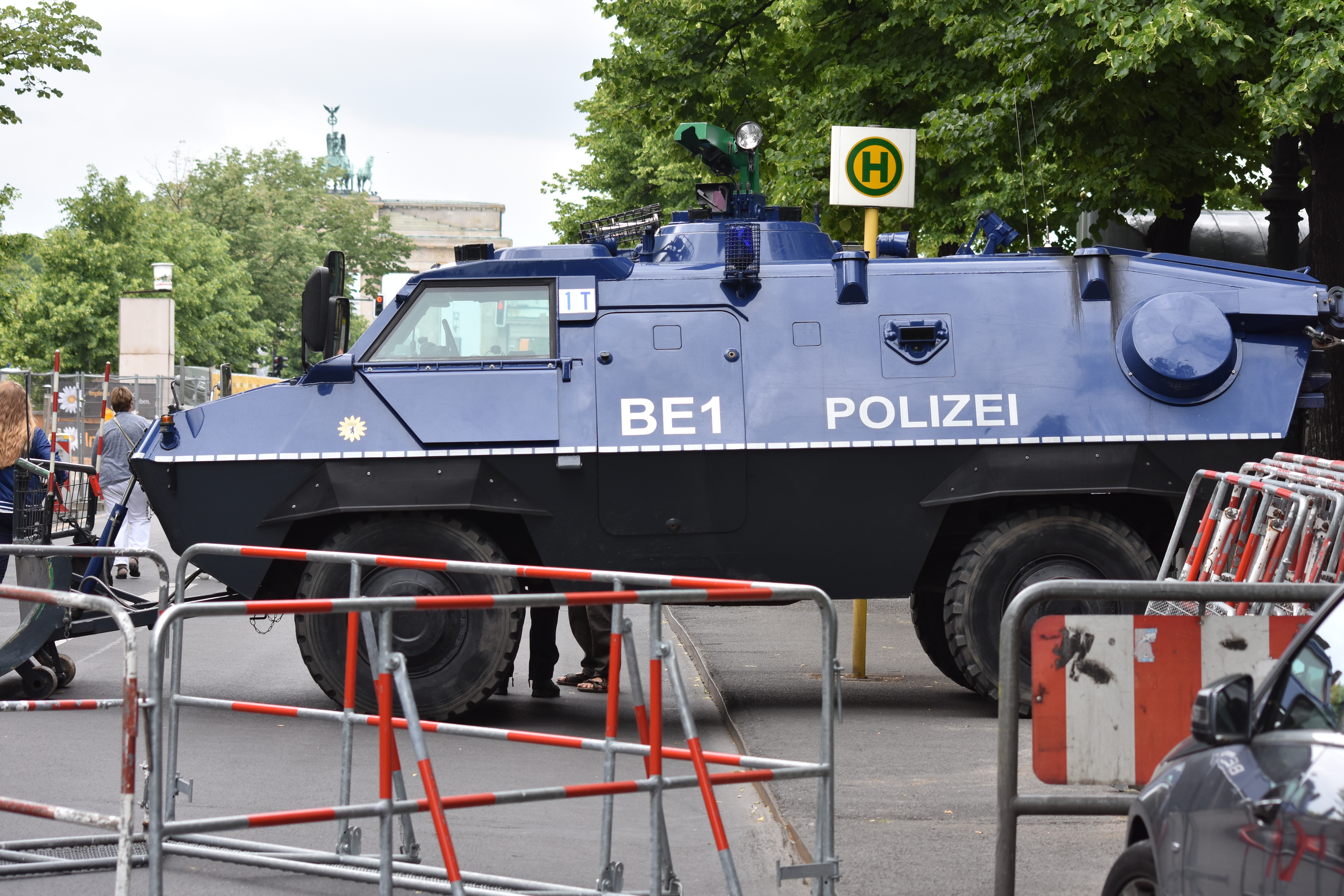
Berlin police Sonderwagen BE1 armored vehicle (2017).

Each Direktion had several police stations (Abschnitte, all in all 38) where the patrol car staff (Schutzpolizei/Schupo) is located. Other sub departments of a Direktion are (not all listed):

- Referat Verbrechensbekämpfung - detective branch (Kriminalpolizei/Kripo) and plainclothes units of the Schupo.
- Referat Zentrale Aufgaben - central services:
  - Verkehrsdienst - traffic police
  - Direktionshundertschaft - a company of special police
  - Diensthundführer - K9

==== Other divisions ====
The Division Operations/Traffic Management has the following subbranches:

- Bereitschaftspolizei (BePo; lit. 'Readiness police') – Uniformed units (two battalions, each with 4 companies and an engineer unit) that provide additional manpower for the Schupo, natural disasters, sporting events, traffic control or demonstrations (riot/crowd control).
- Wasserschutzpolizei (WSP; lit. 'Water protection police') – The river police for patrolling rivers, lakes, and harbours.
- Zentraler Verkehrsdienst (lit. 'Central traffic service') – The traffic police with many sub departments for (just examples): Honor escorts during state visits, Autobahnpolizei (highway police), tracing of vehicles without insurance or known drivers without a license, specialized units for the controlling of vehicles with hazardous materials,
- Diensthundführer (lit. 'Doghandling service') – Police dog
- Polizeihubschrauberstaffel Berlin (PHuSt BE; lit. 'Berlin Police helicopter squadron') – The Berlin Police run a Eurocopter EC135 helicopter together with the Bundespolizeipräsidium Berlin.

The Division Central Special Services has the following subbranches:

- Objektschutz (lit. 'property protection') – The Berlin Police has a special branch for the guarding of buildings, especially embassies or watch over and transport convicts. These non-sworn officers are employees with limited police authority. They are armed and wear the same uniform as the Schupo but different rank insignia.
- Gefangenenwesen – Custody

=== Criminal Investigation Department ===
The Criminal Investigation Department (Landeskriminalamt - LKA) is responsible for investigating the most serious crimes (exclusive tasks of the LKA like crimes against the constitution, organised crime, youth gangs or political motivated crime) and works closely with the six local directorates. The LKA supervises police operations aimed at preventing and investigating criminal offences, and coordinates investigations involving more than one Direktion.

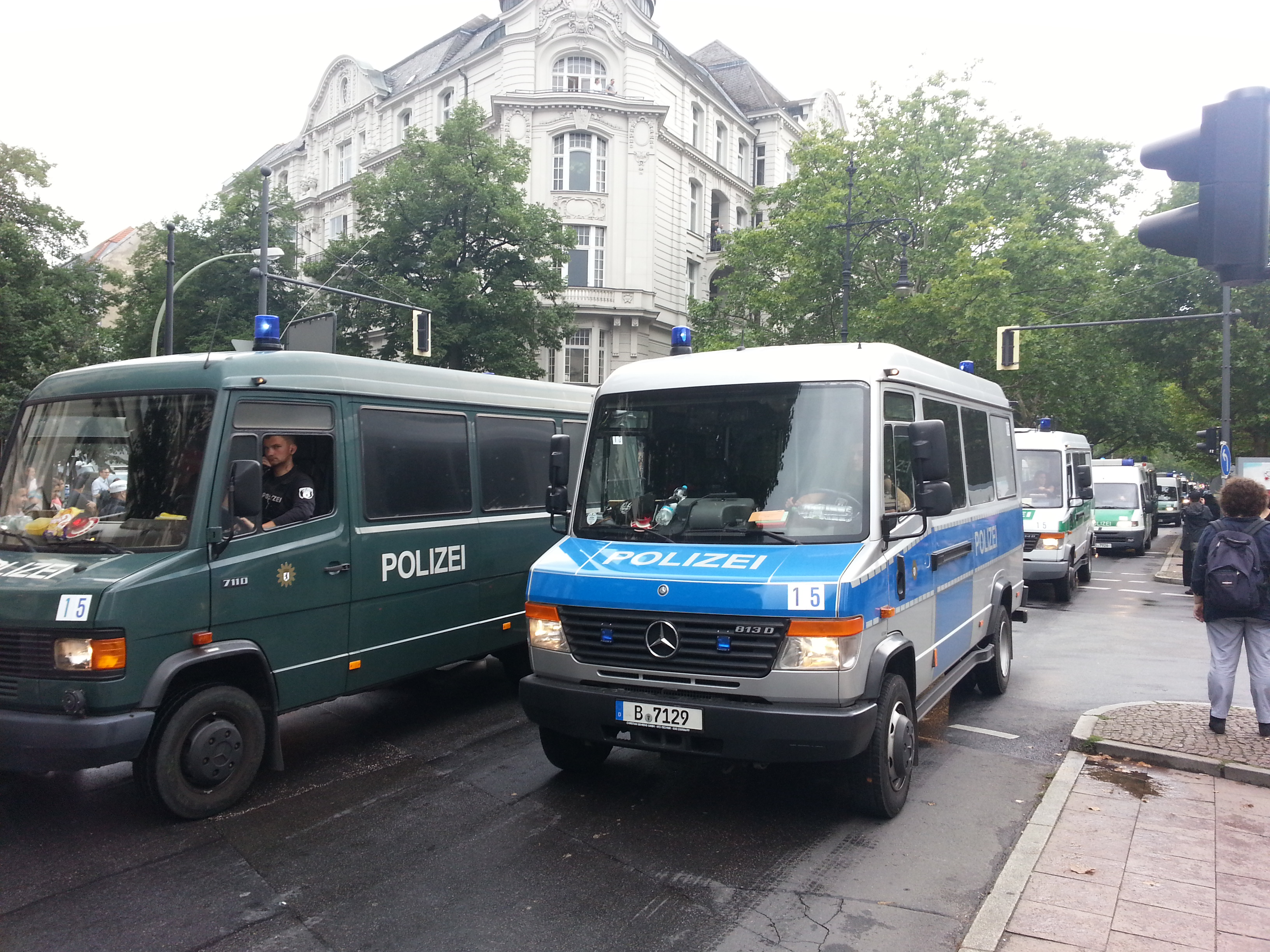
A police bus in blue-silver livery (2014).

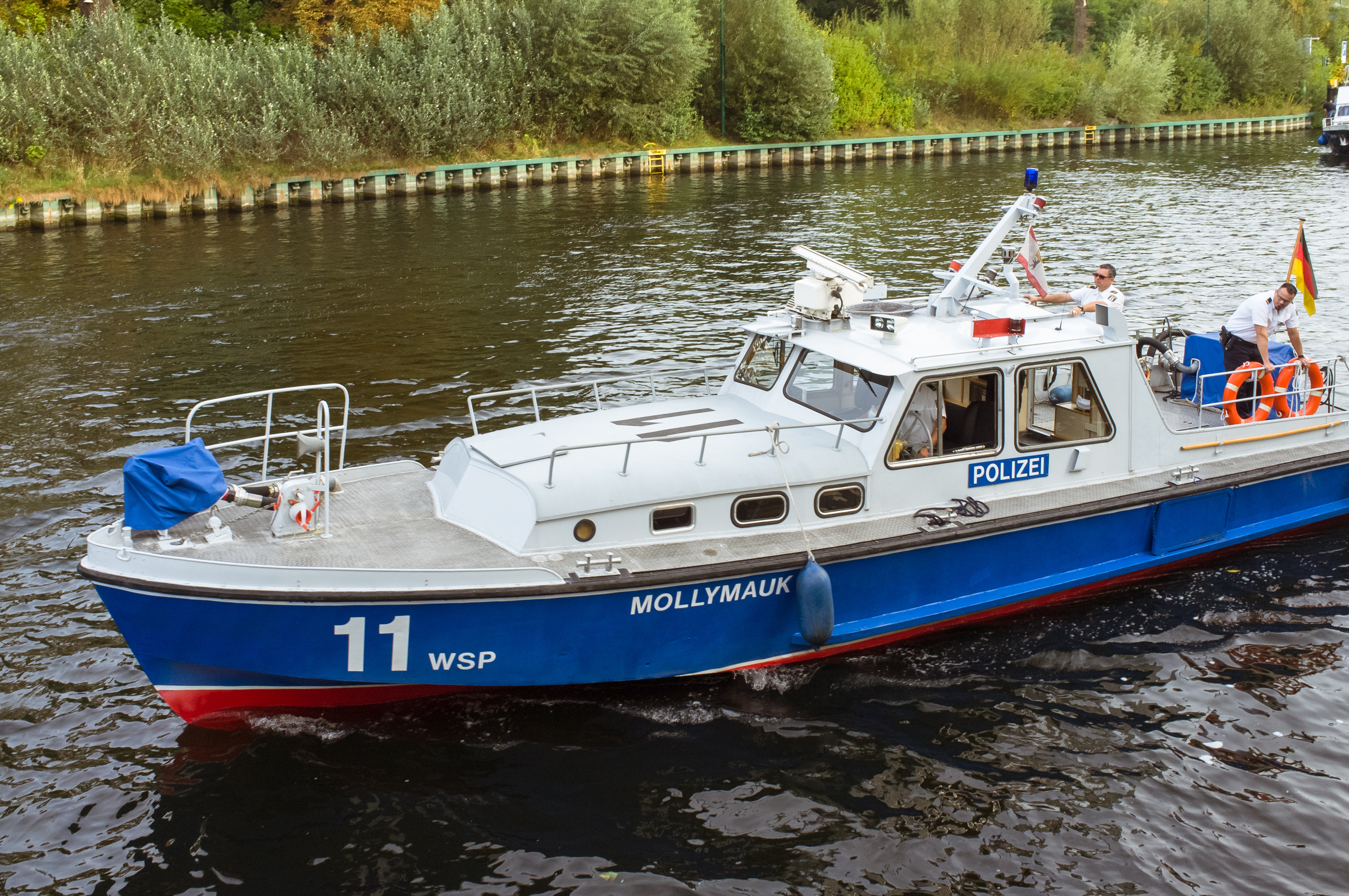
A Berlin police boat (2014).

Dedicated to the LKA:

- Spezialeinsatzkommando (SEK; lit. 'Special task force') - The SWAT teams of the German state police.
- Mobiles Einsatzkommando (MEK; lit. 'Mobile task force') - The MEKs are plainclothes teams of the LKA with special tasks like mentioned above and special manhunt units
- Personenschutzkommando (lit. 'Personal protection') – Personal security plainclothes unit, protecting politicians and VIPs

=== Police Academy ===
The general education and training are in charge through the police academy in Berlin.

=== Central Services Directorate ===
The Central Services Directorate is responsible for all administrative and logistical support, like financial services, HR, facility management or ICT.

== Workforce ==
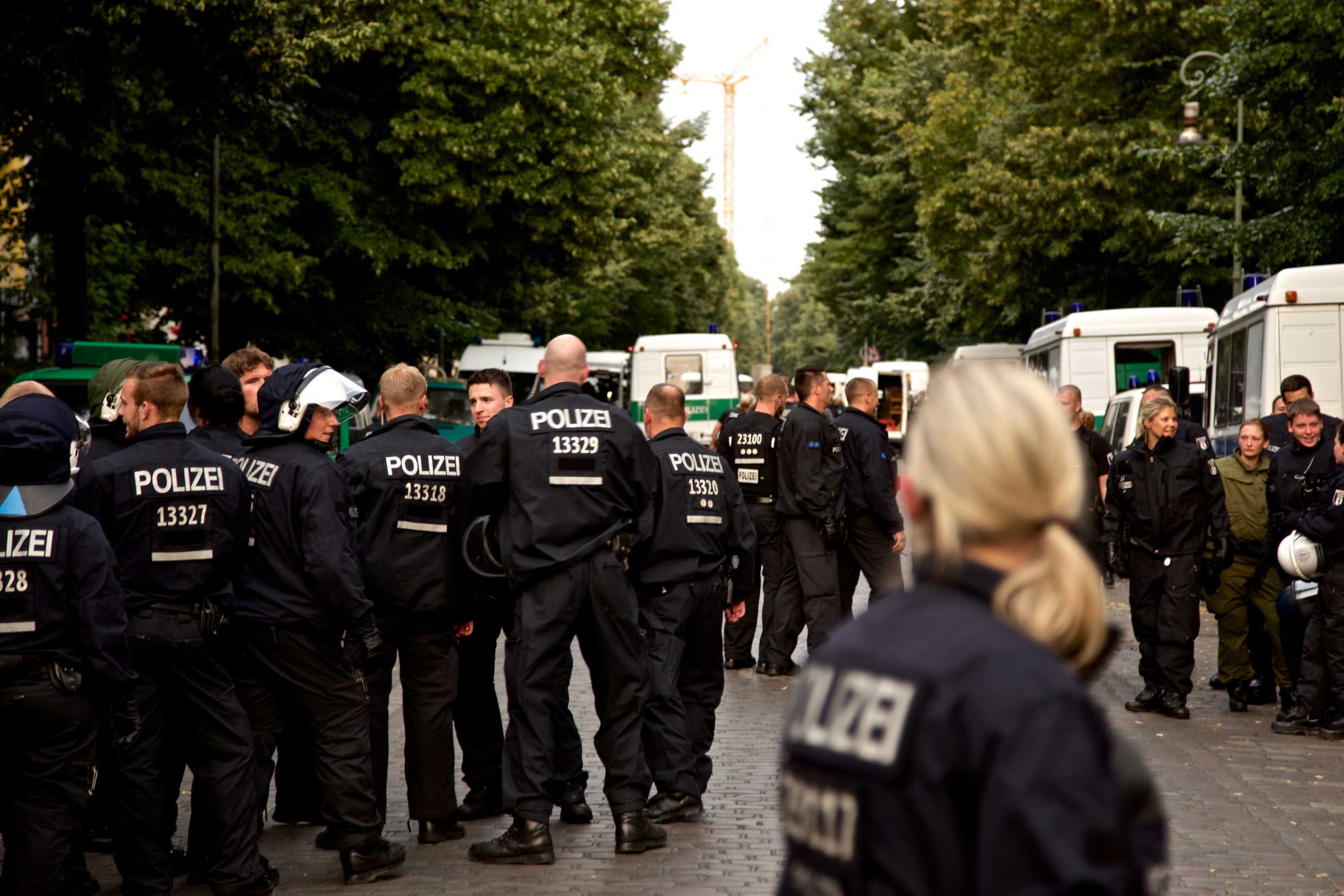
Berlin Police force (2014).

- 18,558 police officers in uniform and plain clothes (2023)
- 2,543 security guards, prison-officers and staff in other law-enforcement related areas (2023)
- 3,085 administrative staff, including management and clerical staff, technical staff and scientists of various disciplines (2023)
- 3,022 apprentices and trainees (2023)
- 2,797 vehicles (2023)
- 1.957 Billion Euro annual budget (2023)

== See also ==
- Babylon Berlin
- Politics in Berlin
- List of law enforcement agencies in Germany
- Law enforcement in Germany
- Landespolizei (German state police forces)
- Stadtpolizei (German municipal police forces)
