= Magnus von Levetzow =

German naval officer and Nazi politician (1871–1939)

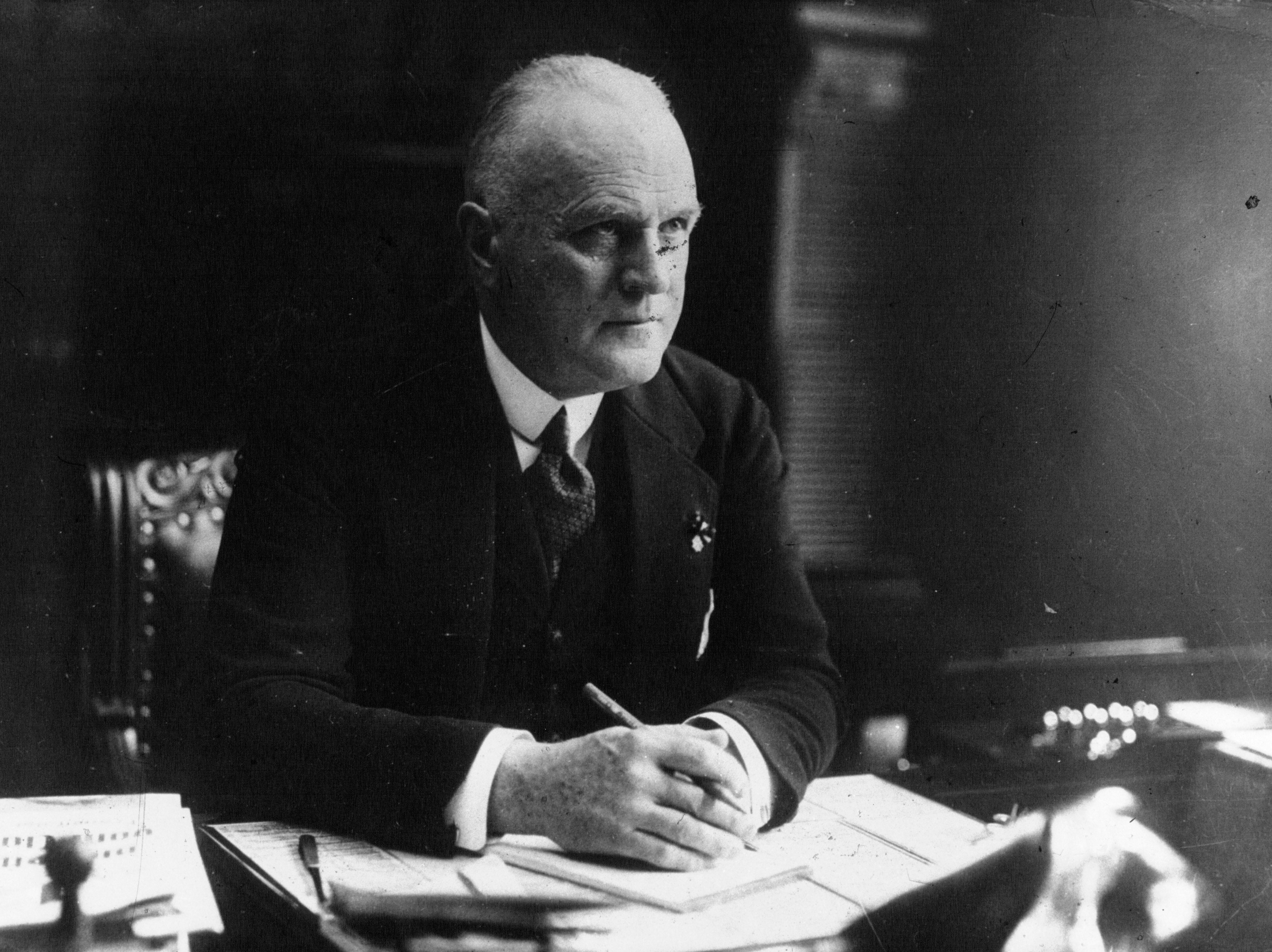
- Levetzow in 1933

Berlin Police President
- In office 15 February 1933 – 19 July 1935
- Preceded by: Kurt Melcher
- Succeeded by: Wolf-Heinrich Graf von Helldorff

Prussian State Councilor
- In office 15 November 1933 – 13 March 1939

Reichstag Deputy
- In office 31 July 1932 – 12 November 1933

Personal details
- Born: 8 January 1871 Flensburg, Province of Schleswig-Holstein, Kingdom of Prussia, German Empire
- Died: 13 March 1939 (aged 68) Berlin, Nazi Germany
- Resting place: Stahnsdorf South-Western Cemetery
- Party: Nazi Party
- Profession: Naval officer

Military service
- Allegiance: German Empire; Weimar Republic
- Branch/service: Imperial German Navy; Reichsmarine
- Years of service: 1889–1920
- Rank: Konteradmiral
- Commands: SMS Stralsund; SMS Moltke
- Battles/wars: World War I: Raid on Yarmouth; Raid on Hartlepool; Battle of Dogger Bank; Battle of the Gulf of Riga
- Awards: Pour le Mérite

Magnus Otto Bridges von Levetzow (8 January 1871 – 13 March 1939) was a German aristocrat and naval officer who rose to the rank of Konteradmiral. He became a Nazi Party politician and served as the police president of Berlin from 1933 to 1935. He was involved in purging the police of Nazi opponents, in organizing the Gestapo and in establishing the Columbia concentration camp. He was removed from office after being blamed for a failure to maintain public order during the Kurfürstendamm riots of July 1935. Levetzow was a deputy in the Reichstag in 1932–1933, and a member of the Prussian State Council from 1933 until his death.

== Early life ==
Levetzow was born to an aristocratic family in Flensburg in 1871, and was taught by private tutors at the family estate in Gravenstein (today, Gråsten, Denmark) until 1880. He then attended the Gymnasium in Roskilde and Copenhagen until 1885, then the Johanneum in Hamburg until 1889.

== Imperial German Navy career ==
On 13 April 1889, Levetzow joined the Imperial German Navy as an officer cadet. In 1893, he passed the naval officer examination and embarked upon a long naval career. In the following six years, he was employed as a ship's officer in domestic and overseas waters. From 1899 to 1901, he was the adjutant at the Wilhelmshaven naval base. From 1900 to 1902, he attended the German Imperial Naval Academy at Kiel and, from 1903 to 1906, he served at the Imperial Admiralty in Berlin. From 1906, he was assigned to the High Seas Fleet as a navigation officer and served aboard SMS Wittelsbach, SMS Scharnhorst and SMS Braunschweig. From 1909 to 1912, Levetzow was a staff officer at the High Seas Fleet command, and then received the command of the light cruiser SMS Stralsund. At the end of January 1913, he was promoted to Kapitän zur See and appointed commander of the battle cruiser SMS Moltke.

Levetzow commanded Moltke through the first two years of the First World War and participated in many major naval engagements. He took part in the German raids on Yarmouth and Hartlepool (November and December 1914), the Battle of Dogger Bank (January 1915) and the Battle of the Gulf of Riga (August 1915). In 1916, Levetzow was appointed chief of operations of the High Seas Fleet staff and was involved in the planning for the Battle of Jutland. In 1917, he was awarded the Pour le Mérite for his role in planning Operation Albion, an amphibious landing in the Baltic Islands. In 1918, he was promoted to Kommodore and commanded the 2nd Reconnaissance Group of the High Seas Fleet. In August 1918, Levetzow was appointed chief of staff of the Naval Command under Admiral Reinhard Scheer.

In October 1918, Levetzow was involved in the decision to order the High Seas Fleet to attack the British Grand Fleet. Large parts of the crews refused this order, sensing the futility of such an action in view of the impending German defeat. The arrests of the sailors who tried to prevent the fleet from leaving port led to the Kiel Mutiny, which triggered the November Revolution.

== Weimar Republic ==
After the end of the war, Levetzow remained in the service at the newly formed Reichsmarine. In January 1920, he was promoted to Konteradmiral and placed in command of the Baltic Sea naval station in Kiel. During the Kapp-Lüttwitz Putsch in March 1920, he supported the putschists and gave orders to immediately arrest Reich President Friedrich Ebert and Reich Minister of Defense Gustav Noske if they arrived in Kiel. After the putsch failed, he was arrested in Lütjenburg, held in custody for a short time and then forced into retirement from the Reichsmarine in October 1920.

From 1924 to 1926, Levetzow worked for the Junkers airline. A committed monarchist, he sought the restoration of the exiled Kaiser Wilhelm II and became politically active in monarchist and conservative causes. As an opponent of the Versailles Treaty and the payment of war reparations, Levetzow took part in organizing the 1929 referendum against the Young Plan. In 1931, Levetzow joined the Nazi Party and, in the 1932 German presidential election, he supported Adolf Hitler over the incumbent Paul von Hindenburg. Levetzow typified the conservative aristocrats who, due to their fierce opposition to the liberal democratic Weimar Republic, joined forces with the Nazis. In the election of July 1932, Levetzow was elected as a deputy to the Reichstag on the Nazi Party electoral list. He would be reelected in November 1932 and March 1933.

== Nazi Germany ==
On 15 February 1933, two weeks after the Nazi seizure of power, Levetzow was appointed police president of the Berlin police in place of Kurt Melcher by Reichskommissar for the Prussian Interior Ministry, Hermann Göring. In this post, Levetzow played a key role in purging the Berlin police of Nazi opponents and in setting up the Gestapo under Rudolf Diels. In addition, he was involved in plans for establishing the Columbia concentration camp in Berlin to imprison opponents of the regime in the spring of 1933. On 15 November 1933, Göring, now Prussian Minister President, appointed Levetzow to the recently reconstituted Prussian State Council.

Levetzow was an opponent of lawless violence and antisemitism, and often came into conflict with the more radical Berlin Sturmabteilung (SA) leadership, as well as with Berlin Gauleiter Joseph Goebbels who had been trying to have him replaced since from at least November 1934. On 13 July 1935, the Party publicized an incident in which Jewish patrons booed a film with antisemitic themes at a Berlin movie theater. Goebbels' propaganda newspaper, Der Angriff organized a counter-demonstration for 15 July and invited public participation. That evening the so-called "Kurfürstendamm riots" took place, in which 200 Nazis vandalized Jewish-owned businesses and randomly and violently assaulted Jews on the street and in cafes along the fashionable thoroughfare. This attracted much international condemnation and Goebbels, who had helped instigate the outburst of violence, skillfully deflected the responsibility onto Levetzow, whom Der Angriff blamed for a failure to maintain public order. On 19 July 1935, Levetzow was removed from the post of police president and replaced by the police chief of Potsdam, Wolf-Heinrich Graf von Helldorff, who until March had been the commander of the SA in the Berlin-Brandenburg area.

Though Levetzow retained his seat on the Prussian State Council, he played no prominent role in government. He returned to the aircraft industry, managing the Berlin office of the Bremen-based Weser Flugzeugbau aircraft manufacturing company. He died in Berlin in March 1939.

== Awards and decorations ==
- Pour le Mérite
- Order of the Red Eagle 3rd class with bow
- Order of the Crown 2nd class with swords
- Knight's Cross of the House Order of Hohenzollern with swords
- Iron Cross (1914) 2nd and 1st class
- Service Award Cross of Prussia
- Military Merit Order of Bavaria, 3rd class with crown and swords
- Hanseatic Cross of Hamburg
- Friedrich-August-Kreuz 2nd and 1st class
- Knight's Cross 1st class of the Albert Order with crown and swords
- Cross of Honor of the Order of the Württemberg Crown
- Commander of the Order of Franz Joseph

== Sources ==
- Information about Magnus von Levetzow in the Reichstag database
- Lilla, Joachim (2005). Der Preußische Staatsrat 1921–1933: Ein biographisches Handbuch. Düsseldorf: Droste Verlag. ISBN 978-3-770-05271-4.
- Longerich, Peter (2015). Goebbels: A Biography. Vintage. ISBN 978-0-099-52369-7.
- Magnus Levetzow entry in the Deutsche Biographie
- Miller, Michael D.; Schulz, Andreas (2015). Leaders of the Storm Troops. Vol. 1. Solihull, England: Helion & Company. ISBN 978-1-909-98287-1.
