= Justus von Gruner =

Prussian official

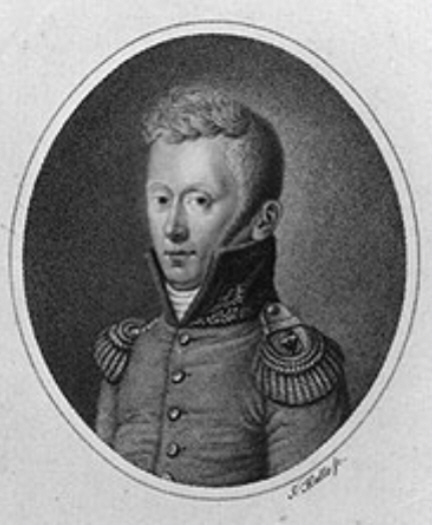
Justus von Gruner

Karl Justus Gruner from 1815 Justus von Gruner (28 February 1777 – 8 February 1820) was a Prussian official who became the first president of the Berlin Police.

== Biography ==
Justus Gruner was born as a son of a lawyer in Osnabrück and studied law and political science at the universities of Halle and Göttingen. From 1799 to 1802 he worked as an advocat in Osnabrück. He entered the Prussian service and worked as an official in the Prussian colonial administration. Gruner became known as a careful and hard-working civil servant in the areas Prussia had recently conquered in Poland. He worked in the region of Posen where he helped German settlers. After this he also worked in East Prussia and West Pomerania.

In 1809 Gruner was appointed as director of the Police of Berlin. The Prussian ministers Stein and Hardenberg became impressed by his commitment, patriotism and reformist ideas. In Berlin Gruner was responsible for the centralization of the police force and extended its jurisdiction to the suburbs. He also reformed the fire department and devised different sorts of measures to combat corruption. Because of those merits the Prussian Secret Council of State appointed him as chief of the "higher police". But Gruner was displeased with the hesitancy of king Frederick William III of Prussia and resigned from his post in 1812.

After his resignation he started to create an anti-Napoleonic spy network from Prague. He was asked to do this on behalf of tsar Alexander I of Russia. He was just a couple of months in the business of spying when he was captured by the police force that worked for Clemens von Metternich, in that time an ally of Imperial France. In 1813 Gruner was released after Austria joined the Sixth Coalition against Napoleon. He was immediately appointed as governor of the general government of the liberated Duchy of Berg.

Due to his contacts with Hardenberg and Stein he was asked to become the head of the Allied security service and created after his arrival in Paris the Allied General Directorate of Police and the Allied military police force. His service would be responsible for assisting and keeping an eye on the French administration of the Restoration and for ensuring the safety of the occopying forces of the Allies. His forces were tasked to amass rumours on behalf of the occupying powers. The first success of Gruner and his force in France was the arrest of the French Napoleonic spy Karl Schulmeister. In November 1815 the Prussian headquarters was moved to Caen and the function and the force of Gruner were abolished. He received his last payment in January 1816.

Next he was sent to Switzerland as a diplomat where he worked until in 1819. As a Prussian ambassador he had influence on the Swiss politics and Gruner contributed to the reorganisation of the Swiss military. Despite his anti-French sentiment he showed himself as an advocate for the Swiss neutrality. He died in 1820 in Wiesbaden.
