= Curt von Ulrich =

German Nazi politician and SA general (1876–1946)

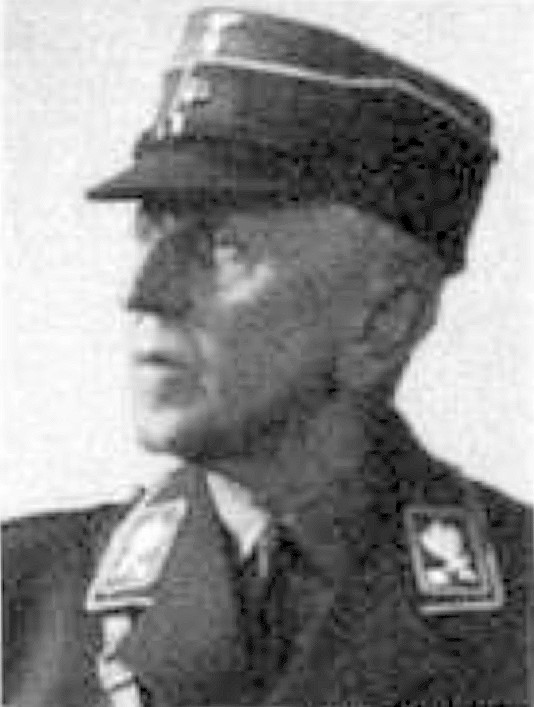

Oberpräsident, Province of Saxony
- In office 29 September 1933 – 1 July 1944
- Preceded by: Kurt Melcher
- Succeeded by: Position abolished

Additional positions
- 1933–1945: Prussian State Councilor
- 1933–1945: Reichstag Deputy
- 1930–1933: Reichstag Deputy

Personal details
- Born: 14 April 1876 Fulda, Province of Saxony, Kingdom of Prussia, German Empire
- Died: 2 February 1946 (aged 69) Special NKVD Camp No. 8, Torgau, Soviet occupation zone of Germany
- Party: Nazi Party
- Other political affiliations: German National People's Party
- Profession: Military officer
- Civilian awards: Golden Party Badge

Military service
- Allegiance: German Empire; Weimar Republic
- Branch/service: Imperial German Army; Reichswehr
- Years of service: 1894–1920
- Rank: Oberstleutnant
- Unit: 23rd Guards Dragoons (1st Grand Ducal Hessian); Hussar Regiment 14
- Battles/wars: World War I
- Military awards: Iron Cross, 1st and 2nd class

Curt Albert Paul von Ulrich (14 April 1876 – 2 February 1946) was a German military officer and a Nazi Party politician who served from 1933 to 1944 as the Oberpräsident of the Prussian Province of Saxony. He also was a member of the Reichstag from 1930 to 1945 and an SA-Obergruppenführer.

== Early life ==
Ulrich was the son of a Prussian Generalmajor and member of the nobility. He attended schools in Hanover, Danzig (today, Gdańsk) and Wiesbaden. After obtaining his Abitur, Ulrich joined the 23rd Guards Dragoons (1st Grand Ducal Hessian) regiment in Darmstadt in September 1894. After attending the Prussian War Academy, he served on the General Staff as a senior adjutant. In 1913 he joined the 14th (2nd Kurhessian) Hussars, based in Kassel. He served in the First World War as a staff officer, a regimental commander and a quartermaster of the Oberste Heeresleitung (Supreme Army Command). He was badly wounded, received the Iron Cross, 1st and 2nd class, and was considered partially disabled. After the end of the war, he remained in the Reichswehr until 20 April 1920 when he was discharged from Hussar Regiment 14 in Kassel with the rank of Oberstleutnant.

Conservative in his political outlook, Ulrich joined the German National People's Party. Over the next few years, he became active in the Verband nationalgesinnter Soldaten (Association of Nationally Minded Soldiers), a right-wing veterans organization. In 1924 he joined the even more radical Nationalverband Deutscher Offiziere (National Association of German Officers). By 1925, he was active in Der Stahlhelm, the main German war veterans organization that was often allied with the Nazi Party. He rapidly became a local leader and a district leader of this organization.

== SA and Nazi Party political career ==
On 12 November 1925, Ulrich joined the Nazi Party and the Sturmabteilung (SA). As an early Party member, he later would be awarded the Golden Party Badge. From 1926 to 1928 he was Gauführer of the SA, Schutzstaffel (SS) and Hitler Youth (HJ) in Gaue Hesse-Nassau-North, Hesse-Nassau-South and Hesse-Darmstadt. He also served as chairman of the Gau-level Party Court. From 1928 to 1930 he served under Franz Pfeffer von Salomon as Stellvertreter des Obersten SA-Führers (Deputy to the Supreme SA Leader) for western Germany. Ulrich served as the Generalinspekteur (Inspector General) of the SA, SS and HJ for all of Germany and Austria from 1930 to 1933. When Ernst Röhm took over as Stabschef of the SA in early 1931, he sought to strengthen the SA headquarters in Munich. Röhm used the office of the Generalinspekteur to subordinate the SA to his direction. In this key position, Ulrich and his staff traveled constantly, reporting on morale, equipment and the degree of compliance with Röhm's directives among the SA units. On 1 January 1933, Ulrich was promoted to the rank of SA-Obergruppenführer.

In addition to his SA duties, Ulrich pursued a political career. In the 1930 parliamentary election, he attained a seat in the Reichstag. He continued to be reelected and served as a deputy for electoral constituency 19 (Hesse-Nassau) until the election of 1936 and then for constituency 10 (Magdeburg) until the fall of the Nazi regime. On 4 August 1933, Prussian Minister President Hermann Göring appointed Ulrich to the Prussian State Council. On 29 September 1933, Ulrich succeeded Kurt Melcher as the Oberpräsident of the Prussian Province of Saxony. He would hold this post for nearly the entire duration of the Nazi regime.

Ulrich was in poor health and went on leave in February 1944 after prolonged periods of illness. On 1 July 1944, Saxony was divided into two new provinces (Magdeburg and Halle-Merseburg) and Ulrich was succeeded as Oberpräsident by the Nazi Party Gauleiter of Gau Magdeburg-Anhalt (Rudolf Jordan) and Gau Halle-Merseburg (Joachim Albrecht Eggeling). Ulrich moved from Magdeburg to Wernigerode in autumn 1944. On 18 April 1945, he was arrested there by the Western Allies and imprisoned in Magdeburg until the end of June. After being released and returning to Wernigerode, the Soviet occupying forces arrested him in August 1945. After a short imprisonment in Magdeburg, he was interned in Soviet NKVD Special Camp No. 8 in Torgau, where he died on 2 February 1946.

== Sources ==
- Campbell, Bruce (1998). The SA Generals and the Rise of Nazism. Lexington: University Press of Kentucky. ISBN 978-0-813-12047-8.
- Lilla, Joachim (2005). Der Preußische Staatsrat 1921–1933: Ein biographisches Handbuch. Düsseldorf: Droste Verlag. ISBN 978-3-770-05271-4.
- Miller, Michael D.; Schulz, Andreas (2012). Gauleiter: The Regional Leaders of the Nazi Party and Their Deputies, 1925–1945. Vol. 1 (Herbert Albrecht - H. Wilhelm Hüttmann). R. James Bender Publishing. ISBN 978-1-932-97021-0.
- Miller, Michael D.; Schulz, Andreas (2017). Gauleiter: The Regional Leaders of the Nazi Party and Their Deputies, 1925–1945. Vol. 2 (Georg Joel - Dr. Bernhard Rust). R. James Bender Publishing. ISBN 978-1-932-97032-6.
- Orlow, Dietrich (1969). The History of the Nazi Party: 1919–1933. University of Pittsburgh Press. ISBN 0-8229-3183-4.
