= Margarete Koppers =

German judge

Margarete Koppers (born 19 August 1961 in Wissel) is a German lawyer and currently Attorney General in Berlin. She is the first woman in the office. Before that she was Vice President of the Berlin Police, also the first woman in the office.

== Life ==
Koppers grew up in North Rhine-Westphalia and moved to Berlin in the early-1980s, where she studied law. In 1988, she joined the Berlin Department of Justice, became a judge and finally held the office of Vice President of the Berlin Regional Court. For two years, she worked as a research assistant at the Federal Constitutional Court in Karlsruhe.

On 8 March 2010, Koppers was appointed police vice-president, becoming acting police chief for Dieter Glietsch, who was still in office at that time. She provisionally headed the Berlin police force for one and a half years after no successor could be appointed for Glietsch, who retired at the end of May 2011 and was succeeded by Klaus Kandt only on 17 December 2012. Koppers remained in office as police vice-president until 18 February 2018.

Kopper's conduct of office in the context of Berlin's organized crime as well as her decisions as Attorney General have been the subject of several national reports.

Koppers was married and now, after having tried out several "relationship models," lives with her life partner in Berlin. Koppers is married to a family court judge.
