= Blutmai =

Political violence in Berlin, May 1929

- Part of political violence in Germany
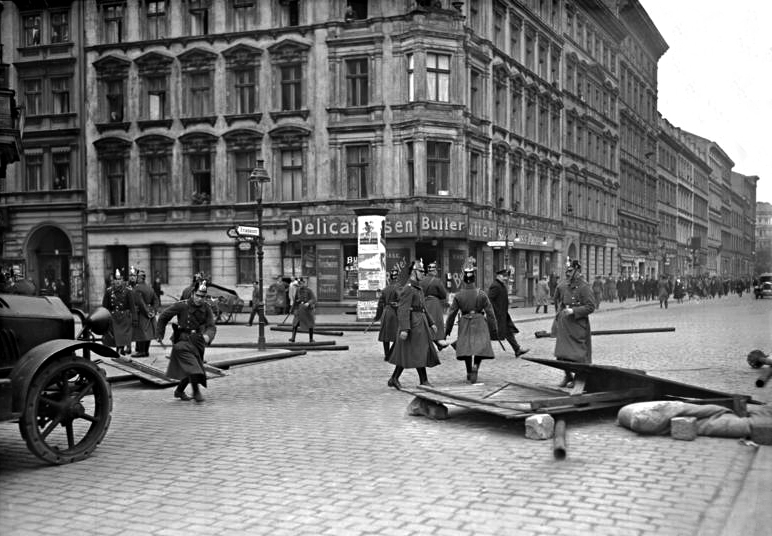
- Berlin Police dismantle a barricade erected by communists
- Date: 1–3 May 1929
- Location: Berlin, Germany
- Methods: Political violence

Parties
Communist Party of Germany; Roter Frontkämpferbund	Berlin Police (under Social Democrat control)

Lead figures
Ernst Thälmann	Albert Grzesinski; Karl Zörgiebel

Casualties and losses
Deaths: 33 unaffiliated civilians killed Injuries: ~200; Arrests: 1,200+	Injuries: 47

Blutmai (English: Bloody May, lit. 'Blood May') was an outbreak of political violence that occurred in Berlin from 1 to 3 May 1929.

It occurred when the Communist Party of Germany (KPD) held May Day marches in defiance of a ban on public gatherings in Berlin ordered by the city's police chief Karl Zörgiebel of the Social Democratic Party (SPD). The Berlin Police responded with an immediate and harsh crackdown. Often without regard to whether the persons involved were demonstrators or bystanders, they forcibly and sometimes violently dispersed the crowds that formed. As the day progressed, street battles developed between the protestors and the police, who used firearms and armoured cars. The violence lasted until the afternoon of 3 May, mostly in the working-class neighbourhoods of Wedding and Neukölln.

An estimated 33 civilians, none of whom were involved with the KPD, were killed, 200 injured, and over a thousand people taken into police custody, many of whom were also not involved in the initial KPD rallies. Only 66 of those arrested were charged and 44 convicted. Ten policemen were hurt badly enough to be hospitalized, although none of them suffered from a gunshot wound. In spite of a considerable outcry in the left and liberal press, and angry scenes in the Reichstag, no action was taken against the Berlin Police.

The events of Blutmai deepened the split between the SPD and KPD, the two major left-wing parties of the Weimar Republic, making a united stand against the growing strength of far-right parties more difficult.

== Background ==
=== KPD and Berlin police ===
After the 1928 Reichstag election, the Communist Party of Germany (KPD) with 54 seats remained one of the largest and most politically potent Communist parties in Europe. It was led by Ernst Thälmann, who supported a close alignment with the Soviet Union and the Communist International (Comintern). At the time, the Comintern held the position that social democracy was social fascism and that it frustrated rather than helped the proletariat. As a result, the KPD under Thälmann had a hostile, confrontational attitude toward the Social Democratic Party of Germany (SPD) as defenders of the capitalist status quo. Their perception was reinforced by the explicit anti-Communist views of numerous SPD politicians in the German and Prussian governments, including Chancellor Hermann Müller, federal Interior Minister Carl Severing, Prussian Minister President Otto Braun, Prussian Interior Minister Albert Grzesinski and Berlin Police chief Karl Zörgiebel.

The Berlin Police used military-style training and was criticized both for its reactionary culture and for acquiring army weapons and equipment. The police were regularly involved in political violence throughout the 1920s, including against Communist dissidents. It led to a willingness among the Berlin Police to use "a military advantage to inflict a decisive defeat on the 'proletarian enemy'".

The KPD had a paramilitary wing, the Roter Frontkämpferbund (RFB), which had a history of clashing with police. Like the Nazi Party's Sturmabteilung (SA), the RFB operated in small mobile fighting squads, trained to various degrees in street fighting. In late 1928, four people had died in fights between opposing paramilitary groups.

=== May Day ban ===
In December 1928, Berlin's police chief Karl Zörgiebel issued a ban on open-air political gatherings in Berlin, citing a recent stabbing involving RFB members. On 21 March 1929, Prussia's interior minister Grzesinski extended the prohibition to the whole of Prussia on similar grounds. Two days later he threatened to ban the KPD and its organisations if they did not renounce violence. The bans appeared to affirm the official Communist Party line that capitalism had entered its Third Period, and the state would therefore become more draconian in obstructing efforts to organize the proletariat.

In the lead-up to the 1929 celebration of International Workers' Day on the first of May, KPD-affiliated newspapers urged members and sympathizers to take to the streets. They exhorted workers to defy the ban and organize peacefully, but to be prepared to strike on May 2 "if Zörgiebel dares to spill workers' blood". The newspaper Die Rote Front stressed "the sharpened movement of the power organs of the capitalist state against the proletariat" in describing potential police violence against Communists. The Internationale, the theoretical journal of the KPD, announced that the "revolutionary élan and will to fight among the German working class will show the Social Democratic police minister of the bourgeoisie [that] the proletariat cares nothing for their bans! ... Communism ... will stride with a sure and firm step over even Grzesinski's laughable fascist gestures." The SPD newspaper Vorwärts reported SPD politician Franz Künstler's belief that the KPD was seeking to intentionally sacrifice supporters' lives, saying that the party would have to "reckon with" 200 dead. SPD support for the ban, however, was not unanimous, given that a social democratic government was preventing public gatherings on an international holiday for working people. The Nazi newspaper Der Angriff declared in April 1929 that the SPD and KPD fighting among themselves represented a "favourable wind" for the Nazi Party.

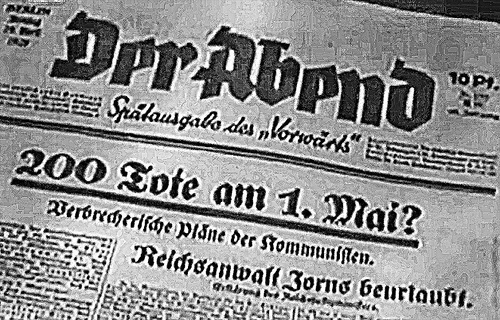
Headline of Der Abend ('The Evening'), late edition of the SPD's Vorwärts, on 29 April 1929: "200 Dead on May 1? The Criminal Plans of the Communists"

On 30 April 1929, police traffic officers were attacked at various places in Berlin by members of the RFB and the Young Spartacus League, the children's and youth organisation of the KPD. On the same day leaflets appeared with the report that the ban on demonstrations on 1 May had been lifted, a report which was also spread by the Communist newspaper Welt am Abend. While the ban on May Day demonstrations had been lifted in some parts of Prussia and the rest of Germany, Zörgiebel reaffirmed its validity for Berlin. The KPD stuck to its call for demonstrations, even "if Zörgiebel dares to shed workers' blood on 1 May". On 28 April, Zörgiebel used the SPD's Vorwärts to call for workers not to follow the KPD's announcements. He stated once again that the numerous bloody clashes in the past had forced him to ban demonstrations and that the KPD, by planning riots on Moscow's orders and being willing to accept many deaths, had contributed to the ban.

The statement was widely publicised under bold headlines in the social democratic press. According to historian Thomas Kurz, the Social Democrats and trade unions had difficulties explaining the break with the tradition of May Day parades. Kurz wrote that the "unrestrained [propaganda] attacks by the KPD" had forced the Social Democrats to fend off the attacks and stand by the ban on demonstrations. The fear that their own supporters might follow the KPD's calls was unmistakable.

== Events of May 1–3 ==
The KPD turnout on 1 May was not particularly large. Around 8,000 people, mainly in Berlin's working-class districts of Wedding and Neukölln, gathered in groups of 50 to 500 people, far fewer than the KPD had expected and the police had feared. Most businesses operated normally. SPD-affiliated trade unions held their own peaceful, well-attended meetings in closed assemblies. The Berlin police, which had mobilized between 13,000 and 16,500 officers, dispersed small street gatherings either by giving the order for them to do so or, more frequently, with the use of batons. Warning shots were also fired.

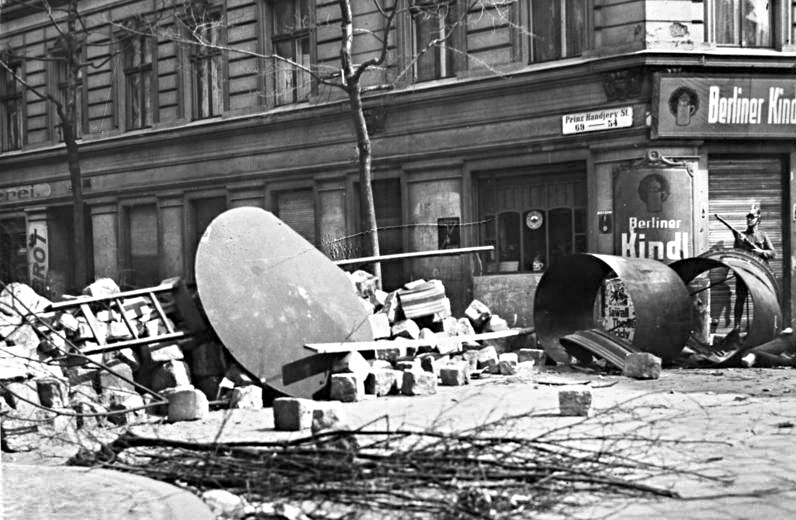
Street barricade erected during the violence

Officers were at times insulted and provoked, and some demonstrators attempted to stop traffic by cutting tram lines and throwing obstacles into the street. The police took action against anything that looked like a protest rally. They used rubber truncheons, water hoses and increasingly also warning shots against demonstrators and – without distinction – the curious and passers-by. Their actions often resulted in the mistreatment of bystanders, about which the liberal press reported in detail over the next few days. According to the liberal newspaper Frankfurter Zeitung, police cars continually rushed to Hermann Square in Neukölln, where officers jumped out and immediately began beating the people they found there. They then fled into the side streets and waited for the police to leave. The newspaper criticised the police for going far beyond what was necessary.

When the indoor gatherings dispersed and the attendees took to the streets for home, the police arrested people merely because they were on the wrong side of a police checkpoint or were swept up while fleeing a police sortie. Some of those leaving the assemblies joined the demonstrators; thousands gathered between Alexanderplatz and Potsdamer Platz. Law enforcement handled the defiance of the ban on open-air gatherings as if it were the popular revolt the Communist press had called for rather than the confused and haphazard act of civic disobedience that it was.

The police soon cleared the streets in central Berlin. In the Wedding district, home to many Communist supporters, the violence gradually escalated into ongoing street combat, which included civilians erecting barricades. The police resorted to firearms, with one of the first victims a man who was watching from his window. Two other victims were shot through doors, including an 80-year-old man in his apartment. Most of the fighting was limited to Kösliner Street in Wedding, and by midnight most of the area was under police control. In the Neukölln district (another KPD stronghold) around Hermann Square, the fighting lasted into the evening. The police used personnel carriers and armoured cars, occasionally aiming their weapons at residences and firing on civilian onlookers.

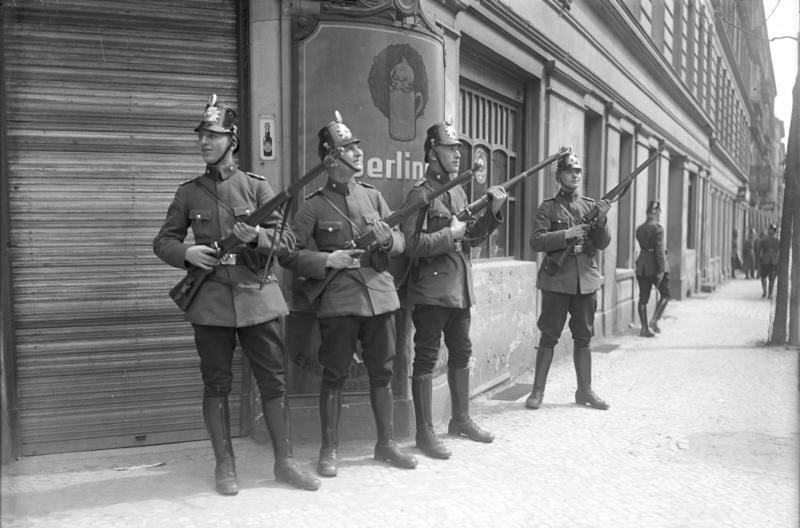
Berlin Police in the streets of Neukölln

On 2 May Interior Minister Carl Severing met with his Prussian counterpart Albert Grzesinski and Prussian Minister President Otto Braun. They immediately imposed a seven-week ban on the primary Communist newspaper Die Rote Fahne ('The Red Flag') as a consequence of its incitement and also to hinder news of the high number of civilian casualties from spreading. In the Reichstag, KPD member Wilhelm Pieck condemned Zörgiebel as a "common murderer", while the SPD defended police leadership. Although Zörgiebel called on the police to show moderation, he contributed to the escalation by placing large parts of Berlin under a state of emergency: "Persons walking on the street without a destination will be arrested. Three or more people are not allowed to walk together ... All persons who do not comply with these orders will put their lives at risk." A curfew was also imposed, street-facing windows had to be closed and lights were not allowed in rooms.

The KPD had called for a general strike on 2 May in response to the police violence, but as with the May Day turnout, it met with limited success. The KPD claimed that 25,000 people went on strike in Berlin on the 2nd, 3rd and 4th of May and that an additional 50,000 walked out in sympathy elsewhere in Germany. On 2 May, and again on the third, the police combed through the workers' neighbourhoods, searched flats and arrested many people. Armoured vehicles with machine guns were used and several people were shot.

The RFB, previously operating underground in fear of outright proscription, joined the clashes in Wedding during the afternoon of 2 May, once more constructing barricades in largely spontaneous defensive actions. The Communist militants and the police exchanged gunfire in the streets. The police also enforced a general curfew, leading to confused confrontations in the darkness.

By the afternoon of 3 May, the fighting had ended, and on 6 May the Berlin Police lifted martial law in the Wedding and Neukölln districts.

== Aftermath ==
Grzesinski extended the ban on the RFB from Berlin to all of Prussia, and by 15 May the RFB and its youth wing, the Rote Jungfront (RJ), were illegal throughout the country. The interior ministers of the German states also discussed banning the KPD but considered it too problematic. Police conducted house-to-house searches in Wedding and made further arrests, heightening the political tension produced by the riots. The harsh police suppression led to a furor in the Reichstag and the Prussian Landtag, with heavy media coverage by both independent and partisan newspapers.

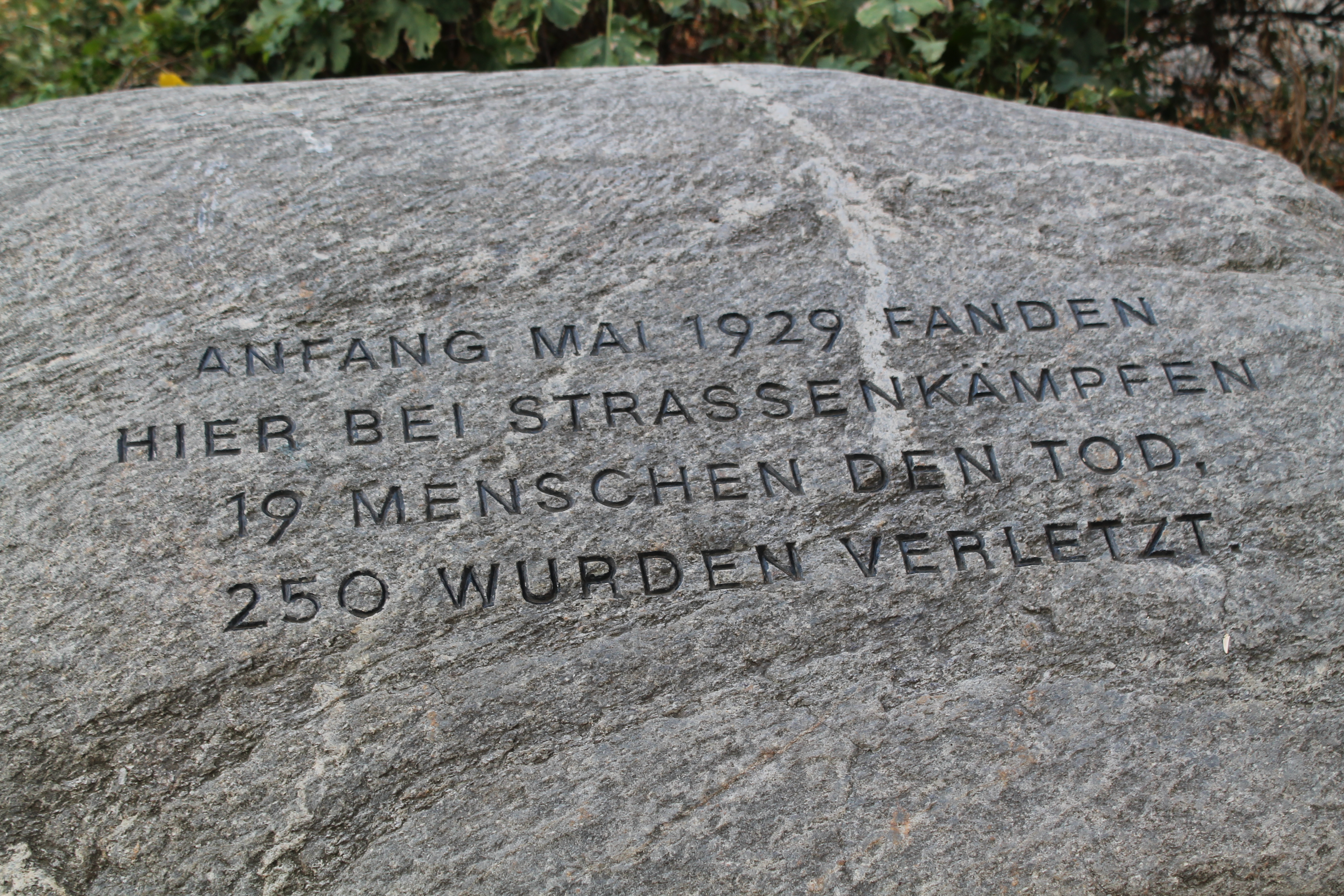
Memorial stone in Berlin's Wiesen Street. The inscription reads: "At the beginning of May 1929, 19 people were killed and 250 injured here in street battles".

It was determined that between 32 and 38 people were killed, all civilians, and all by police firearms save for one individual who was struck by a speeding police van. Around 200 were injured and approximately 1,200 arrested, of whom only 66 were ever charged. Among them, 44 were later convicted and imprisoned, including five RFB members. The total of all sentences passed down came to around ten years in prison; the highest individual sentence was nine months. Eight of the civilians killed were women and 19 were residents of Wedding. Of the first 25 victims, two were SPD members and 17 belonged to no party; none were KPD members. Police found no evidence that the demonstrators who took to the streets were prepared for an armed insurrection, since the house-to-house search in Wedding produced mostly souvenir weapons from World War I. Of the 47 police officers injured, ten were hospitalized and none suffered from a gunshot wound.

The Frankfurter Zeitung reported:

There was no question of combat-style fighting during the entire operation. The police did not have to return any fire from rooftop shooters. The police were dominated by the military attitude that they were dealing with an opponent who was to be treated as an enemy.

There was no official investigation into the police assaults and no police officer was charged. A session of the Prussian state parliament led to a bitter dispute between the SPD and KPD. Motions of no confidence in the government and to dismiss Zörgiebel were defeated. The debate remained without result.

A little over a month after the Blutmai events, the KPD held its Twelfth Party Congress in Berlin. It passed a resolution calling the rioting "a turning-point in political developments in Germany... The preconditions are appearing for the approach of an immediately revolutionary situation, and with its development, an armed uprising must inevitably step onto the agenda." The justification of the police violence by leading representatives of the SPD served as confirmation for the KPD that they were social fascists. The events deepened the split between the labour parties and ultimately benefited the National Socialists.

The SPD had an equivalent to the KPD's social fascism claim in its leaders' anxieties over a new Spartacist uprising. Although the KPD did desire to overthrow the Weimar Republic, extremist parties did not have the same appeal they had after the Great Depression of 1929 hit Germany. The SPD government was convinced that the "Nazi wave will ebb", as evidenced by Grezesinski lifting the ban on Adolf Hitler speaking publicly in September 1928. According to Chris Bowlby, "hysterical assessments" by SPD politicians of the threat posed by the KPD in combination with the militant nature of the Berlin police meant that conflict and even violence between the two groups was probable if not inevitable.

== In popular culture ==
Season 1 of Babylon Berlin, a German television series set during the Weimar Republic that premiered in 2017, includes an in depth depiction of the Berlin police using excessive force and killing unarmed bystanders during Blutmai and the official cover up by the ruling SPD.

== See also ==
- Political violence in Germany (1918–1933)

== Bibliography ==
- Bowlby, Chris (March 1986). "Blutmai 1929: Police, Parties and Proletarians in a Berlin Confrontation". The Historical Journal. 29 (1): 137–158. doi:10.1017/s0018246x00018653. JSTOR 2639259. S2CID 159528044.
- Kurz, Thomas (1988). 'Blutmai'. Sozialdemokraten und Kommunisten im Brennpunkt der Berliner Ereignisse von 1929 [Social Democrats and Communists at the Centre of the Berlin Events of 1929] (in German). Berlin: Dietz. ISBN 978-3-8012-0131-9.
- Rosenhaft, Eve (1983). Beating the Fascists?: The German Communists and Political Violence 1929–1933. Cambridge University Press. p. 32. ISBN 9780521236386.
