= Karl Zörgiebel =

German politician (1878–1961)

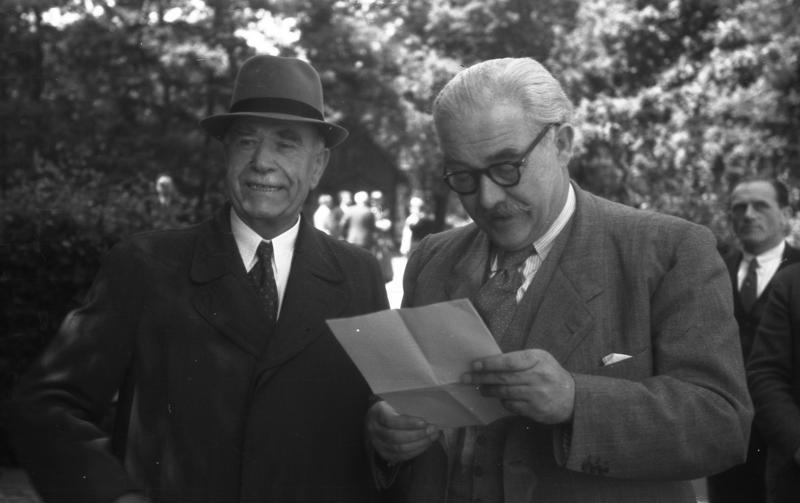
- Karl Zörgiebel (left) in 1948 at the Rittersturz Conference with Hinrich Wilhelm Kopf (right)

Polizeipräsident of the Dortmund Police
- In office 1930–1933
- Preceded by: Josef Lübbring

Polizeipräsident of the Berlin Police
- In office 1926–1930
- Preceded by: Albert Grzesinski
- Succeeded by: Albert Grzesinski

Polizeipräsident of the Cologne Police
- In office 1922–1926
- Preceded by: Paul Runge
- Succeeded by: Otto Bauknecht

Member of the Reichstag
- In office 1920–1924

Personal details
- Born: Karl Friedrich Zörgiebel; September 30, 1878 Mainz, German Empire
- Died: March 14, 1961 (aged 82) Mainz, West Germany
- Party: Social Democratic Party of Germany (1901–1961)

Military service
- Allegiance: German Empire
- Branch/service: Imperial German Navy
- Years of service: 1897–1900; 1914–1917
- Battles/wars: First World War

Karl Friedrich Zörgiebel (September 30, 1878 – March 14, 1961) was a German politician of the Social Democratic Party of Germany (SPD), who served as a Reichstag deputy and Polizeipräsident (Chief of Police) of multiple major German cities, during the Weimar Republic. He is known for his involvement with the Blutmai (Blood Mai), a violent crackdown of Labour Day communist demonstrators, in which over 30 deaths were reported, among them innocent pedestrians.

== Life ==
Karl Zörgiebel was born on September 30, 1878, in Mainz. After completing his education, he apprenticed as a cooper. Zörgiebel completed his mandatory military service between 1897 and 1900. During this time, he served in the Imperial German Navy, including aboard the SMS Kaiserin Augusta.

In 1900, Zörgiebel joined a trade union, and by 1907 was a director at the Union of Coopers, Cellar Managers, and Helpers in Germany. Meanwhile, he had joined the Social Democratic Party of Germany in 1901.

With the outbreak of the First World War, Zörgiebel returned to serve in the navy from 1914 to 1917.

During the German Revolution, Zörgiebel was a member of the Cologne workers' and soldiers' council. Between 1919 and 1921, he was a member of the Prussian constitutional convention (Preußische Landesversamlung). In 1920 Zörgiebel was elected to the Reichstag as a representative of the Koblenz-Trier constituency.

In September 1922 Zörgiebel became police chief of Cologne, a position he would hold until October 1926, when he was appointed police chief of Berlin. Otto Bauknecht would succeed him as police chief of Cologne.

Zörgiebel's tenure as police chief of Berlin was marked by the events of Blutmai. On March 21, 1929, Zörgiebel had ordered a ban on demonstrations, in anticipation of clashes on May Day. Despite the ban, tens of thousands of people attended a May Day demonstration organized by the Communist Party of Germany (KPD) on May 1, 1929. On the orders of Zörgiebel and Prussian Interior Minister Albert Grzesinski, Berlin Police took an aggressive approach to the demonstration which resulted in the deaths of many protesters and uninvolved local residents. Clashes and strikes would continue into May 2 and May 3. On May 3, 1929, the Roter Frontkämpferbund was banned, a ban which would extend to all of Germany on May 14. From May 3 to May 6, Zörgiebel implemented martial law in the Berlin districts of Wedding and Neukölln.

The events of Blutmai had significant political aftershocks. Instances of police brutality against uninvolved bystanders drew condemnation from the liberal newspapers which would otherwise have opposed the communist-led demonstrations. Zörgiebel was also denounced by members of the Reichstag such as Paul Frölich and Wilhelm Pieck. The newspaper Vorwärts, published by the SPD (of which Zörgiebel was a prominent member) initially claimed that only 23 protesters had died, and blamed 'communist agitation' for the deaths. Blutmai is considered by historians as one of the events which forestalled the possibility of cooperation between the SPD and KPD against the rising Nazi Party.

In November 1930, Zörgiebel went into temporary retirement, with Albert Grzesinski taking over as Berlin chief of police.

On December 6, 1931, Zörgiebel came out of retirement to become police chief of Dortmund, following the death of Josef Lübbring. He was one of the few members of the SPD that was not removed from government posts following the 1932 Prussian coup d'état.

When the Nazi Party seized power in 1933, Zörgiebel was dismissed from his position as police chief of Dortmund. Later that year, he was arrested and imprisoned at the Brauweiler Abbey. Zörgiebel was released four months later, and moved to Mainz. There he remained under Gestapo surveillance, and his passport was revoked in 1937.

Following the end of the Second World War, he became state police chief of Rhineland-Palatinate from 1947 to 1949, retiring on July 16, 1949. Zörgiebel died in Mainz on March 14, 1961.

== In popular culture ==
In the 2017 German television series Babylon Berlin, Karl Zörgiebel is portrayed by Thomas Thieme.
