= Kalkar =

- Town
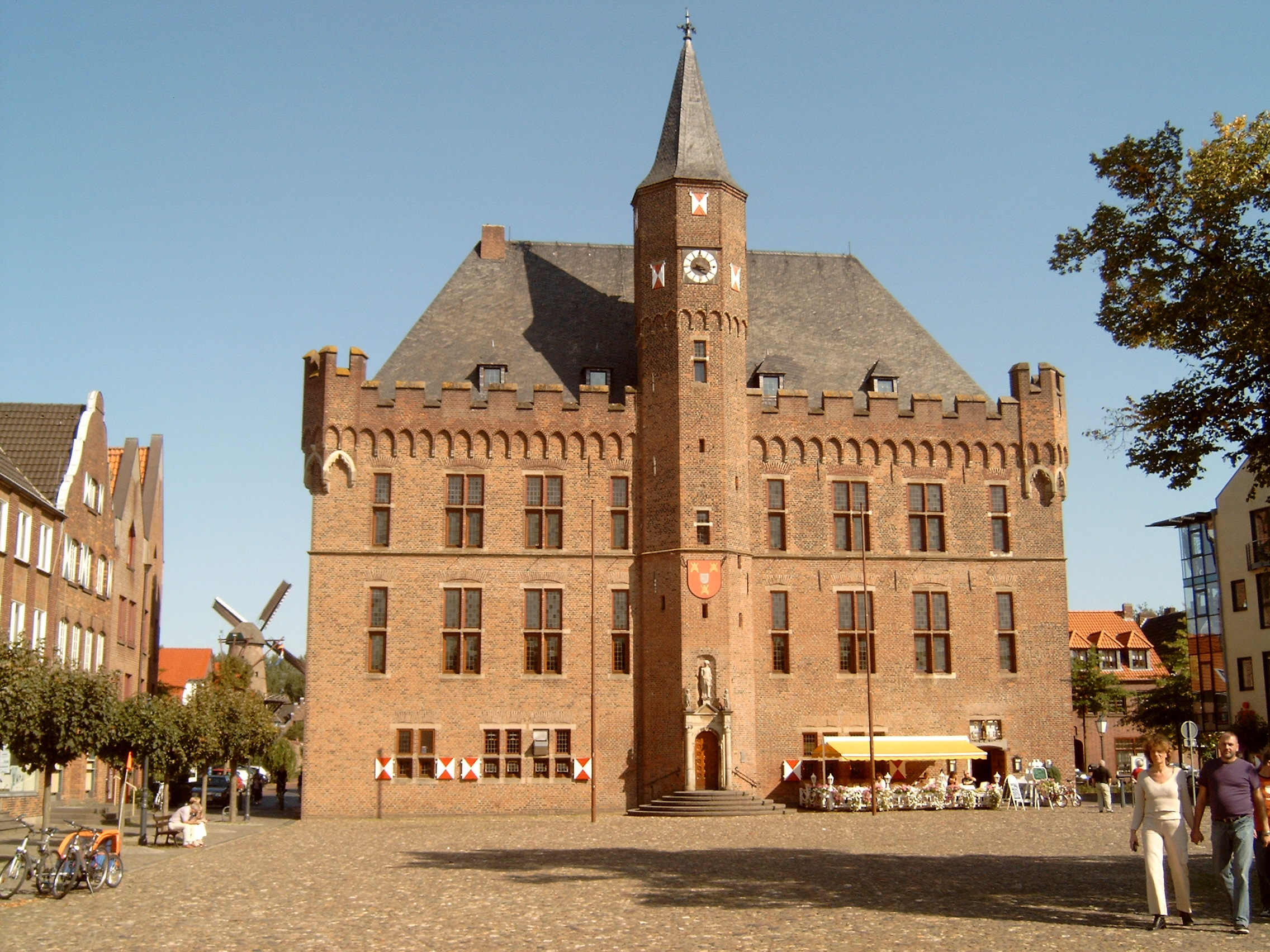
- Marktplatz in Kalkar

- Coat of arms

- Location of Kalkar within Kleve district
- Interactive map of Kalkar
- Location within Germany Location within North Rhine-Westphalia
- Coordinates: 51°44′20″N 6°17′33″E
- Country: Germany
- State: North Rhine-Westphalia
- Admin. region: Düsseldorf
- District: Kleve
- Subdivisions: 13

Government
  - Mayor (2020–25): Britta Schulz

Area
  - Total: 88.2 km^{2} (34.1 sq mi)
- Elevation: 14 m (46 ft)

Population (2025-12-31)
  - Total: 14,467
  - Density: 164/km^{2} (425/sq mi)
- Time zone: UTC+01:00 (CET)
  - Summer (DST): UTC+02:00 (CEST)
- Postal codes: 47546
- Dialling codes: 0 28 24
- Vehicle registration: KLE
- Website: www.kalkar.de

Kalkar (German: [ˈkalkaːɐ̯]) is a municipality in the district of Kleve, in North Rhine-Westphalia, Germany. It is located near the Rhine, approx. 10 km south-east of Cleves. The catholic church St. Nicolai has preserved one of the most significant sacral inventories from the late Middle Ages in Germany.

== History ==
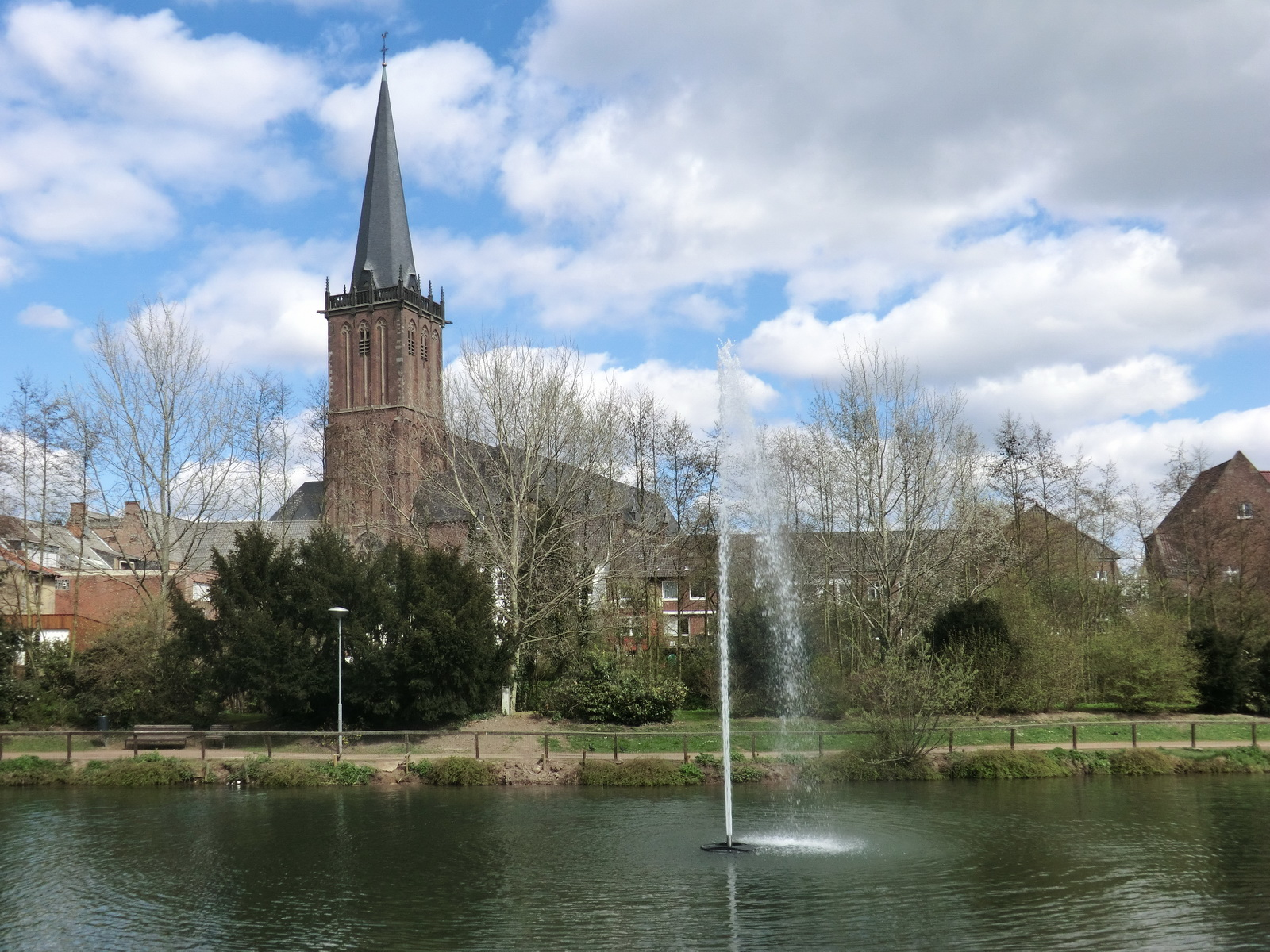
St. Nicolai church

Kalkar was founded by Dirk VI of Cleves in 1230 and received city rights in 1242. It was one of the seven "capitals" of Cleves (called Kleve), until the line of the Duchy of Cleves died out in 1609, whereupon the city went over to the Margraviate of Brandenburg. Marie of Burgundy, Duchess of Cleves retired to Monreberg castle in Kalkar, where she founded a Dominican convent in 1455. Under her influence the city bloomed and artists were attracted to the favorable climate for cultural investment. She died at Monreberg castle in 1463.

== Population ==
Historical population

Year	Pop.	±% p.a.
1965	9,285	—
1970	9,848	+1.18%
1975	10,846	+1.95%
1980	11,068	+0.41%
1985	11,194	+0.23%
1990	11,084	−0.20%
1995	12,560	+2.53%

Year	Pop.	±% p.a.
2000	13,639	+1.66%
2005	14,076	+0.63%
2010	13,829	−0.35%
2015	13,854	+0.04%
2020	13,944	+0.13%
2025	14,467	+0.74%

Source: Landesdatabank Nordrhein-Westfalen

== Air base ==
The USAF 470TH Air Base Squadron supports the NATO Joint Air Power Competence Center (JAPCC) in Kalkar and the NATO CAOC in Uedem. The 470th is not located in Kalkar however.

== Nuclear reactor ==
Between 1957 and 1991, West Germany, Belgium and the Netherlands pursued an ambitious plan for a fast breeder nuclear reactor, the a 300-megawatt (400,000 hp) prototype reactor, SNR-300, near Kalkar. Construction of the SNR-300 began in April 1973. In the wake of large anti-nuclear protests at Wyhl and Brokdorf, demonstrations against the SNR-300 reactor escalated in the mid-1970s. A large demonstration in September 1977 involved a "massive police operation that included the complete closure of autobahns in northern Germany and identity checks of almost 150,000 people".

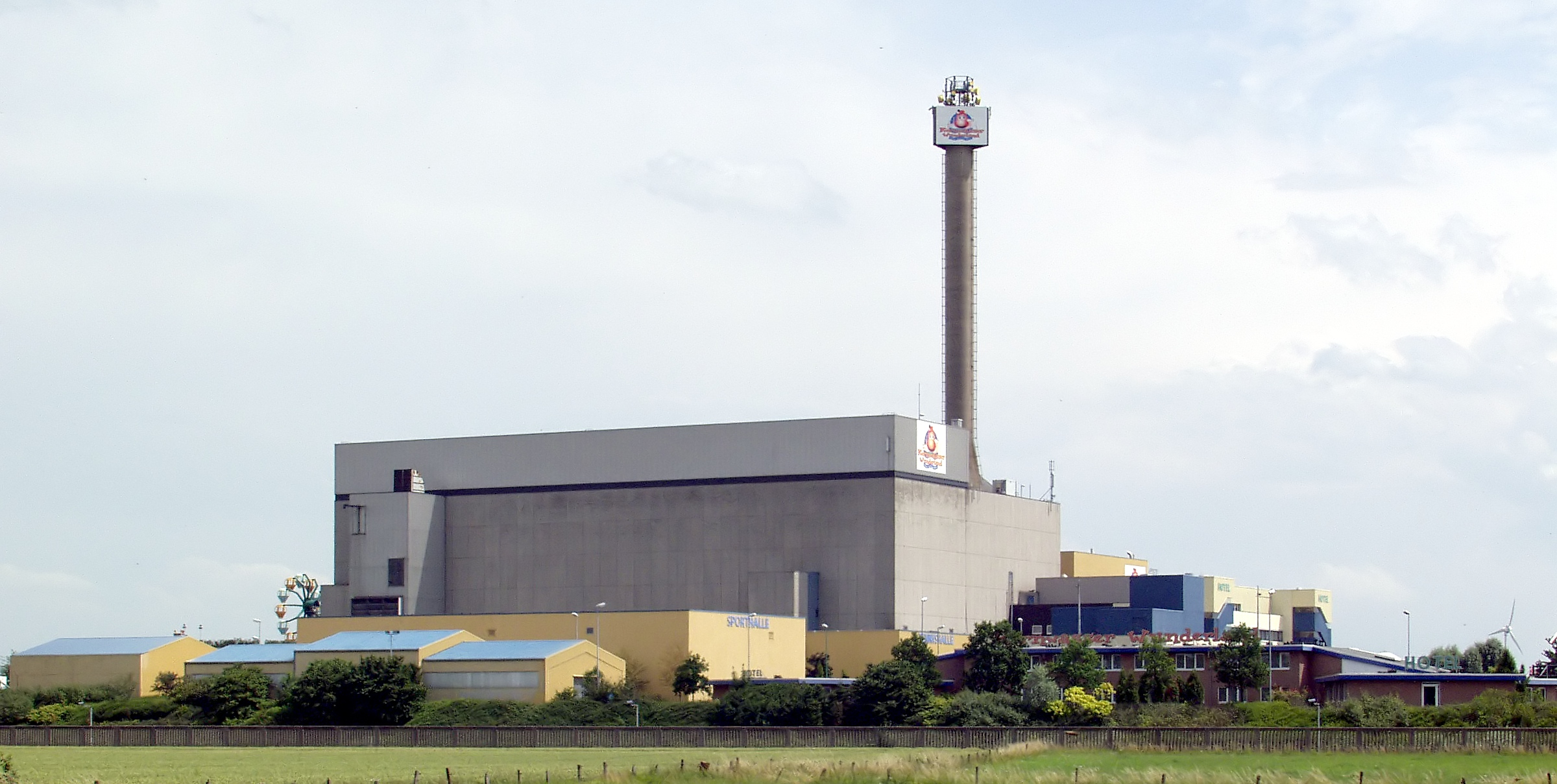
The Kalkar reactor in 2004

Construction of the Kalkar reactor was completed in the middle of 1985, but a new state government was clearly against the project, and opposition mounted following the Chernobyl disaster in April 1986. In March 1991, the German federal government said that the SNR-300 would not be put into operation; the project costs, originally estimated at $150 to $200 million, escalated to a final cost of about $4 billion (equivalent to about $9B in 2025).

The nuclear reactor plant has since been turned into Kern-Wasser Wunderland, an amusement park with a rollercoaster and several other rides and restaurants.

== Novel ==
In the science fiction novel "The Moon Maid", Edgar Rice Burroughs used "Kalkars" as the name for a malevolent fictional race living on the Moon and later invading Earth.

== Gallery ==
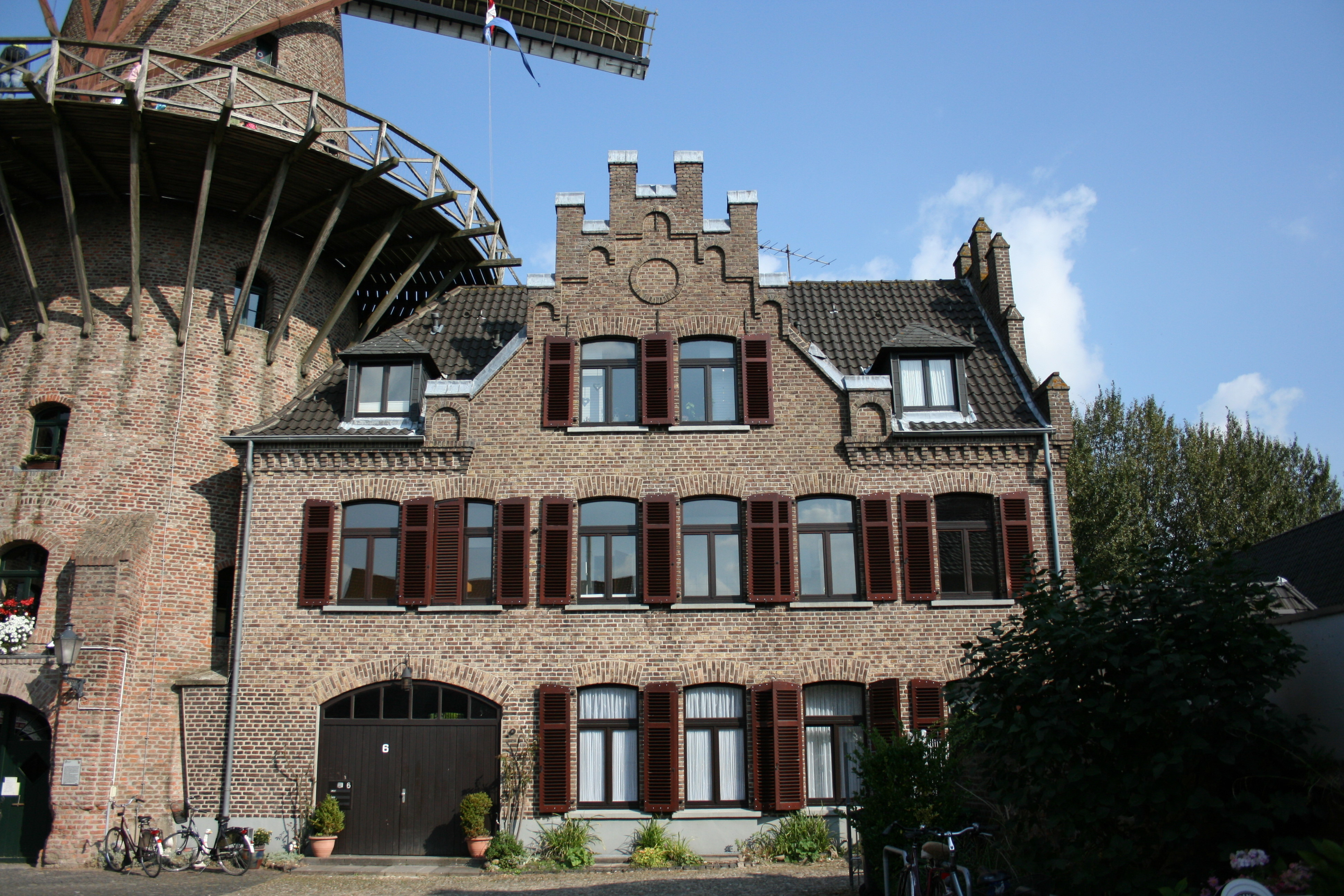
Windmill of Kalkar

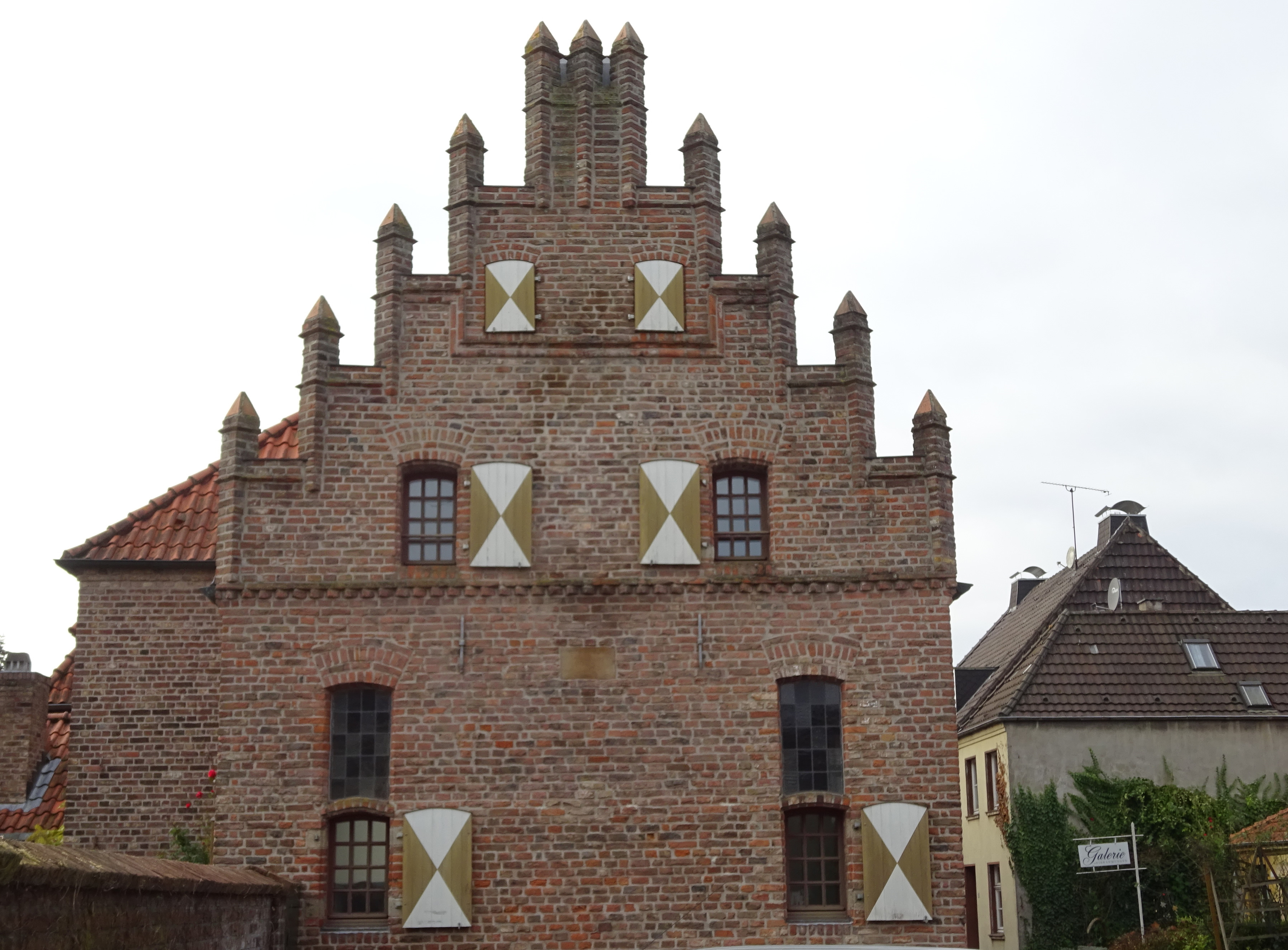
Gothic gable in Kalkar

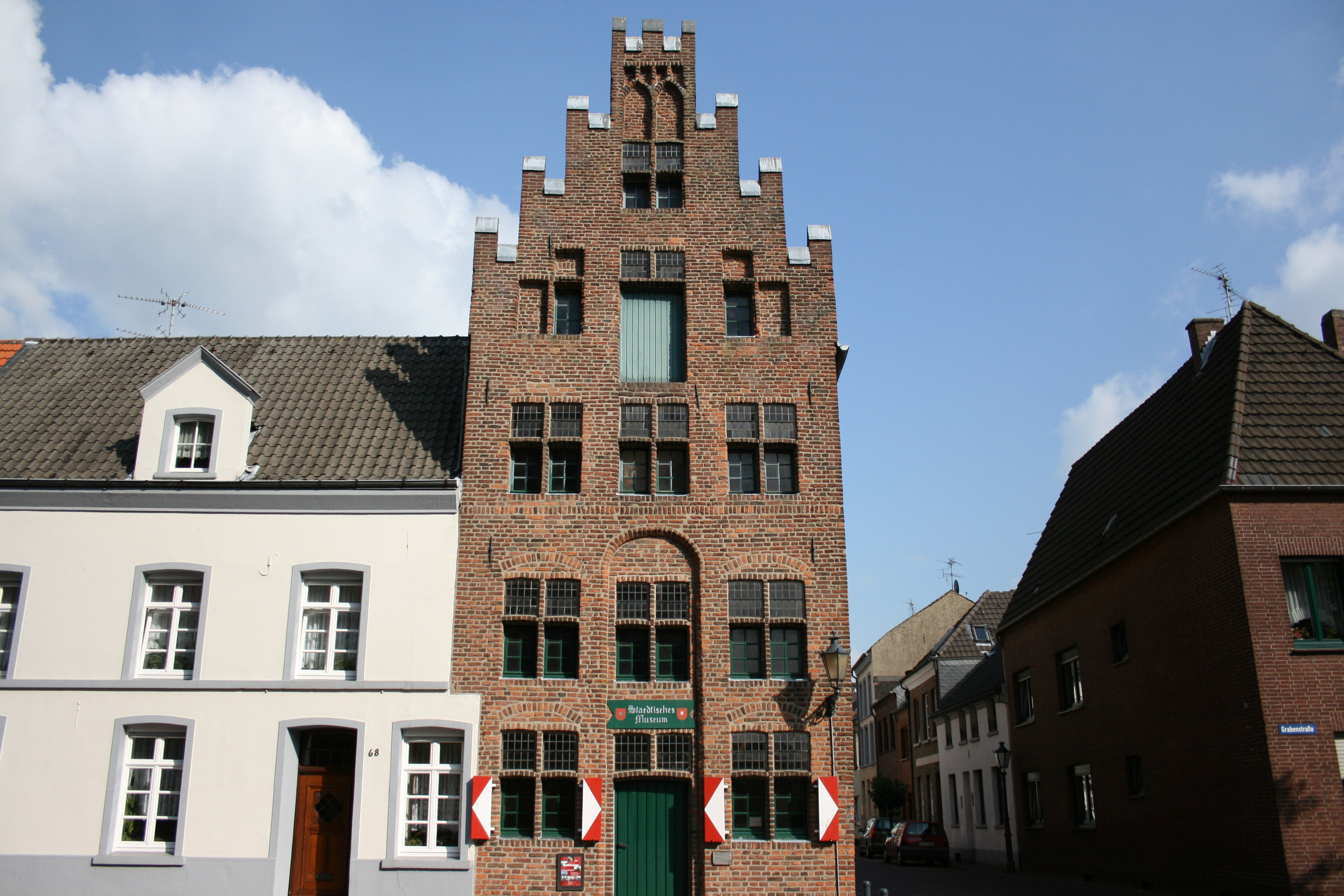
Municipal Museum Kalkar

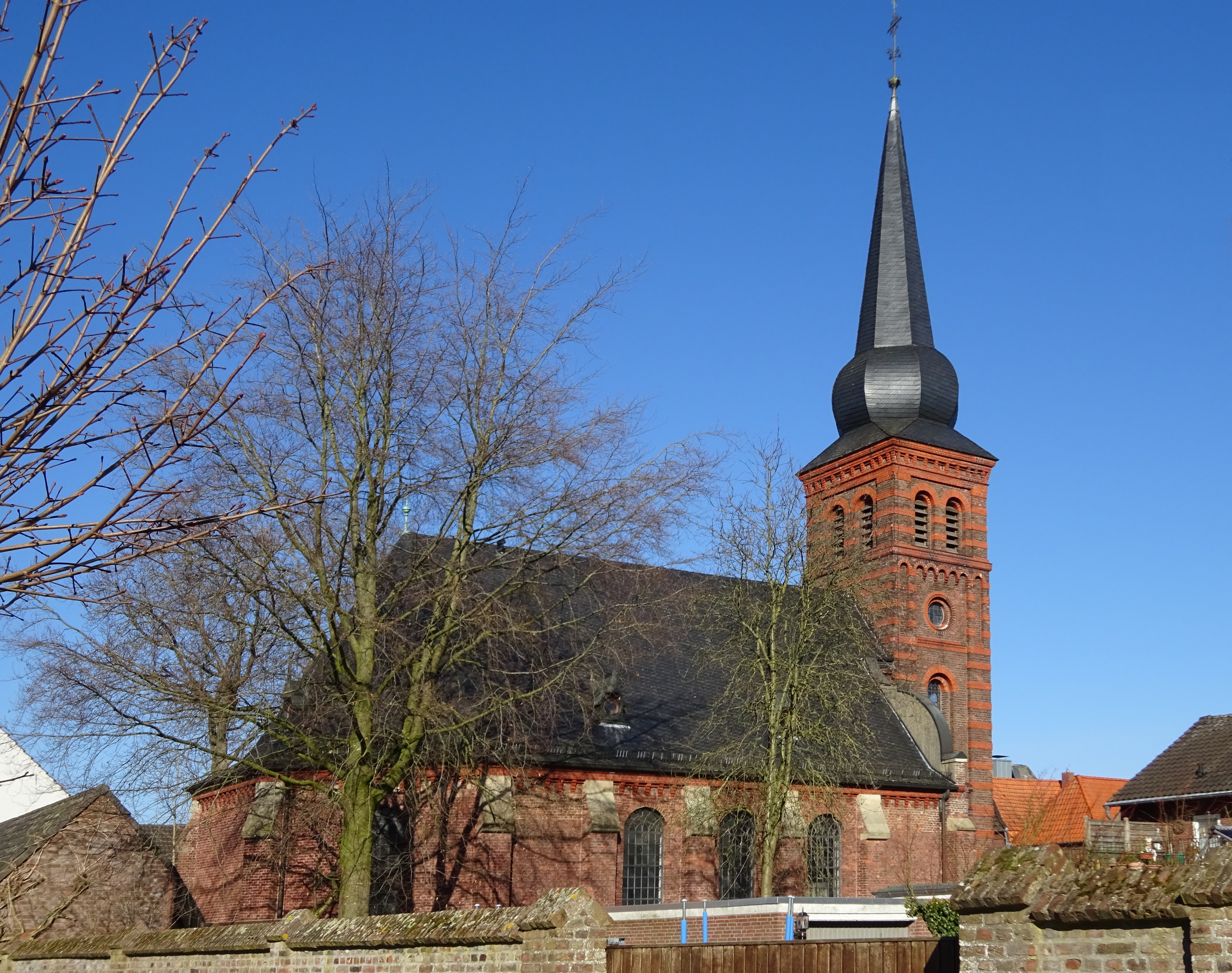
Evangelic church

== Notable people ==
- Henry of Kalkar (1328–1408), German theologian writer
- Jan van Calcar (1499–1546), German painter
- Diederik Sonoy (1529–1597), Dutch-German leader of the Geusen
- Friedrich Wilhelm von Seydlitz (1721–1773), Prussian general
- Ludger Rémy (1949–2017), German cembalist and orchestra dirigent
- Margarete Koppers (born 1961), German jurist
- Christoph Peters (born 1966), German author
- Olaf Bodden (born 1968), German footballer
