= Kurt Melcher =

German lawyer, police chief and politician (1881–1970)

Police President of Essen
- In office 29 September 1919 – 20 July 1932
- Preceded by: Robert von Bemberg-Flamersheim
- Succeeded by: Richard Wiesmann

Police President of Berlin
- In office 20 July 1932 – 15 February 1933
- Preceded by: Albert Grzesinski
- Succeeded by: Magnus von Levetzow

Oberpräsident of the Province of Saxony
- In office 29 May 1933 – 29 September 1933
- Preceded by: Friedrich von Velsen
- Succeeded by: Curt von Ulrich

Reich Trustee of Labour (Special Trustee until 19 October 1938)
- In office 1 January 1935 – 8 May 1945
- Preceded by: Position created
- Succeeded by: Position abolished

Personal details
- Born: 8 July 1881 Barop, Province of Westphalia, Kingdom of Prussia, German Empire
- Died: 14 October 1970 (aged 89) Berlin, West Germany
- Party: German People's Party
- Education: University of Tübingen; Humboldt University of Berlin; Kiel University
- Profession: Lawyer

Military service
- Allegiance: German Empire
- Branch/service: Imperial German Army
- Years of service: 1902–1903; 1914–1918
- Rank: Rittmeister
- Unit: 7th (Rhenish) Uhlan Regiment
- Commands: Feldgendarmerie, VII Army Corps
- Battles/wars: World War I
- Awards: Iron Cross, first and second class

Kurt Melcher (8 July 1881 – 14 October 1970) was a German lawyer and politician who served as the police chief of Essen and Berlin between 1919 and 1933. He was also briefly the Oberpräsident of the Prussian Province of Saxony, and served as the Trustee of Labour for public service from 1935 to 1945.

== Early life ==
Melcher was born in Barop (since 1929, a part of Dortmund), the son of a mine director, and graduated from the Gymnasium there in 1899. He studied law at Eberhard Karls University of Tübingen, Humboldt University of Berlin and Kiel University, and was a member of the student corps Suevia Tübingen. He obtained his doctorate in law, passed his Referendar examination and began a legal clerkship at the higher regional court in Hamm in 1902. He performed mandatory military service with the Royal Prussian Army as a one-year volunteer from October 1902 with the 7th (Rhenish) Uhlan Regiment, based in Sankt Johann (Saarbrücken). Following completion of his Assessor examination in February 1907, he was employed as a lawyer at the Gewerkschaft Deutscher Kaiser coal and smelting works in Hamborn, at the Ilseder Hütte ironworks in Ilsede and at its rolling mill in Peine. In January 1910, Melcher was made a magistrate in Herne. He then went to work for the government office in Düsseldorf on 16 August 1912, becoming a government administrative lawyer in March 1913 and attaining the rank of Regierungsrat (Government Councilor) on 1 December 1915. He returned to military service in the Imperial German Army during the First World War. He served as a Rittmeister of reserves and commander of the Feldgendarmerie of the VII Army Corps, earning the Iron Cross, first and second class.

== Police and political career ==
Discharged from the service at the end of the war, Melcher became Police President of the city of Essen on 29 September 1919. During the French occupation of the Ruhr, he was temporarily expelled from the area between 1923 and 1925 by the occupation authorities. Resuming his post after the end of the occupation, he continued to serve as head of the police until 20 July 1932. On that date, the takeover of the Prussian state government by the Reich under Reich Chancellor Franz von Papen took place. Franz Bracht, the Oberbürgermeister of Essen, was named Prussian Commissioner for the Interior and he installed Melcher as Police President of Berlin, succeeding the Social Democrat Albert Grzesinski. In December 1932, Melcher announced a crackdown on the city's nightlife, in particular, dance halls and nightclubs catering to homosexuals. This resulted in the closure of dozens of establishments, including the famed Eldorado. However, soon after the Nazi seizure of power on 30 January 1933, Melcher, who was a member of the German People's Party, was replaced on 15 February 1933 by the Nazi Party member Magnus von Levetzow.

On 29 May 1933, Melcher received the post of Oberpräsident of the Prussian Province of Saxony and, on 13 September 1933, he was named to the Prussian State Council by Prussian Minister president Hermann Göring. However, on 29 September 1933, he was replaced as Oberpräsident by Curt von Ulrich but retained his seat on the State Council until the fall of the Nazi regime in 1945. In 1934, Melcher was appointed to the Prussian Provincial Council from the Rhine Province. He was assigned as a Sondertreuhänder (Special Trustee) for the civil service from 1 January 1935, and subsequently was elevated to Reichstreuhänder (Reich Trustee) for the civil service from 19 October 1938 until May 1945. In 1937, he also functioned as the transition commissioner for the incorporation of the Free City of Lübeck into the state of Prussia under the provisions of the Greater Hamburg Act. Nothing is known of his post-war life. He died in Berlin on 14 October 1970.

== Sources ==
- Herzog, Dagmar, ed. (2005). Sexuality and German Fascism. New York: Berghahn Books. ISBN 978-1-571-81551-4.
- Kurt Melcher entry in the Files of the Reich Chancellery (Weimar Republic).
- Kurt Melcher entry in Das Deutsche Führerlexikon 1934-1935, pp. 305–306
- Lilla, Joachim (2005). Der Preußische Staatsrat 1921–1933: Ein biographisches Handbuch. Düsseldorf: Droste Verlag. ISBN 978-3-770-05271-4.
- Schneider, Gerhard (1979). Lübecks Bankenpolitik Im Wandel Der Zeiten: 1898–1978. Schmidt-Römhild. ISBN 978-3-795-00435-4.
