= Albert Grzesinski =

German politician (1879–1948)

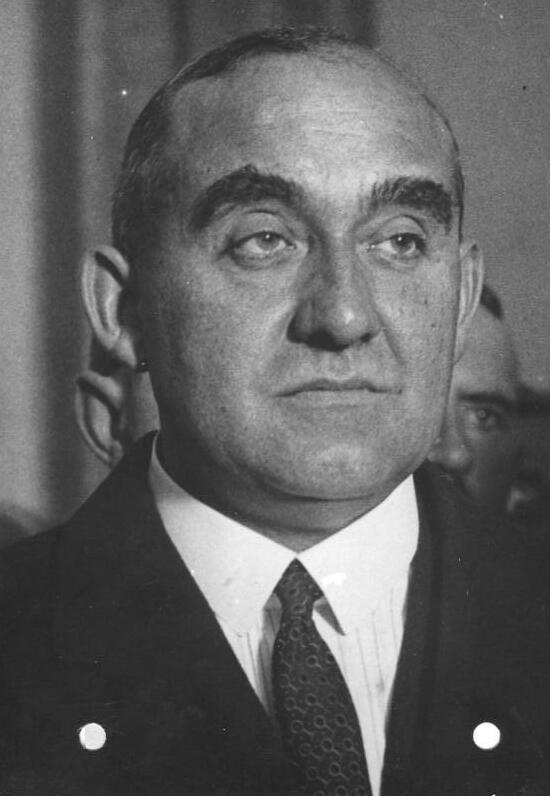
Albert Grzesinski (1926)

Albert Carl Grzesinski (28 July 1879 – 12 January 1948) was a German SPD politician and Minister of the Interior of Prussia from 1926 to 1930.

== Biography ==
Grzesinski was born Albert Lehmann in Treptow an der Tollense, Germany, the illegitimate son of a maid, and grew up with grandparents. He assumed the name of his stepfather in 1892. He became a member of the SPD in 1897. In 1919, he became Under-Secretary of State in the Prussian War Ministry. He declined the position as Reichswehr Minister (Defense) in 1920. From 1922 to 1924, he was chief of the Prussian Police, and from 1925 to 1926, he was chief of the Berlin Police.

Grzesinski's tenure as Minister of the Interior was marked by his efforts to promote democracy, and by the political violence in Germany at the time, especially the violence committed by the communists and hostility between the communists and the social democrats. In 1929, he banned the Rotfrontkämpferbund (Red Front Fighter's League) in Prussia. In May 1929 he was involved in the violent police suppression of illegal open-air communist rallies in Berlin meant to celebrate May Day, which led to several days of rioting known as Blutmai. Over 30 civilians would be killed and over a thousand arrested, leading to widespread criticism over the government response.

Grzesinski resigned on February 28, 1930, for personal reasons. From 1930 to 1932, he was again chief of police. In 1931, as Berlin's police chief, he tried to gag Adolf Hitler, ordering him deported as an undesirable alien, but Chancellor Heinrich Brüning did not sign the order. He was removed from his position following the 1932 Preußenschlag (Prussian Coup), when he was succeeded by the police chief of Essen, Kurt Melcher. According to Christopher Clark, he referred to Hitler as 'the foreigner' and found it 'lamentable' that he should be negotiating with the government 'instead of being chased away with a dog whip'.

Following the Nazi rise to power, and with his name appearing on the first list of Germans who were arbitrarily officially denaturalised according to a new law, which also ensued in the seizure of all his property in Germany, Grzesinski became stateless. He fled to Switzerland in 1933. He then emigrated to France, and in 1937, to the United States. In exile, he was active in anti-Nazi organisations. He died in Queens, New York.

== Literature ==
- Albert Grzesinski: Im Kampf um die deutsche Republik. Erinnerungen eines Sozialdemokraten. Herausgegeben von Eberhard Kolb. München 2001 (Schriftenreihe der Stiftung Reichspräsident-Friedrich-Ebert-Gedenkstätte 9).
