= Volker Kutscher =

German novelist

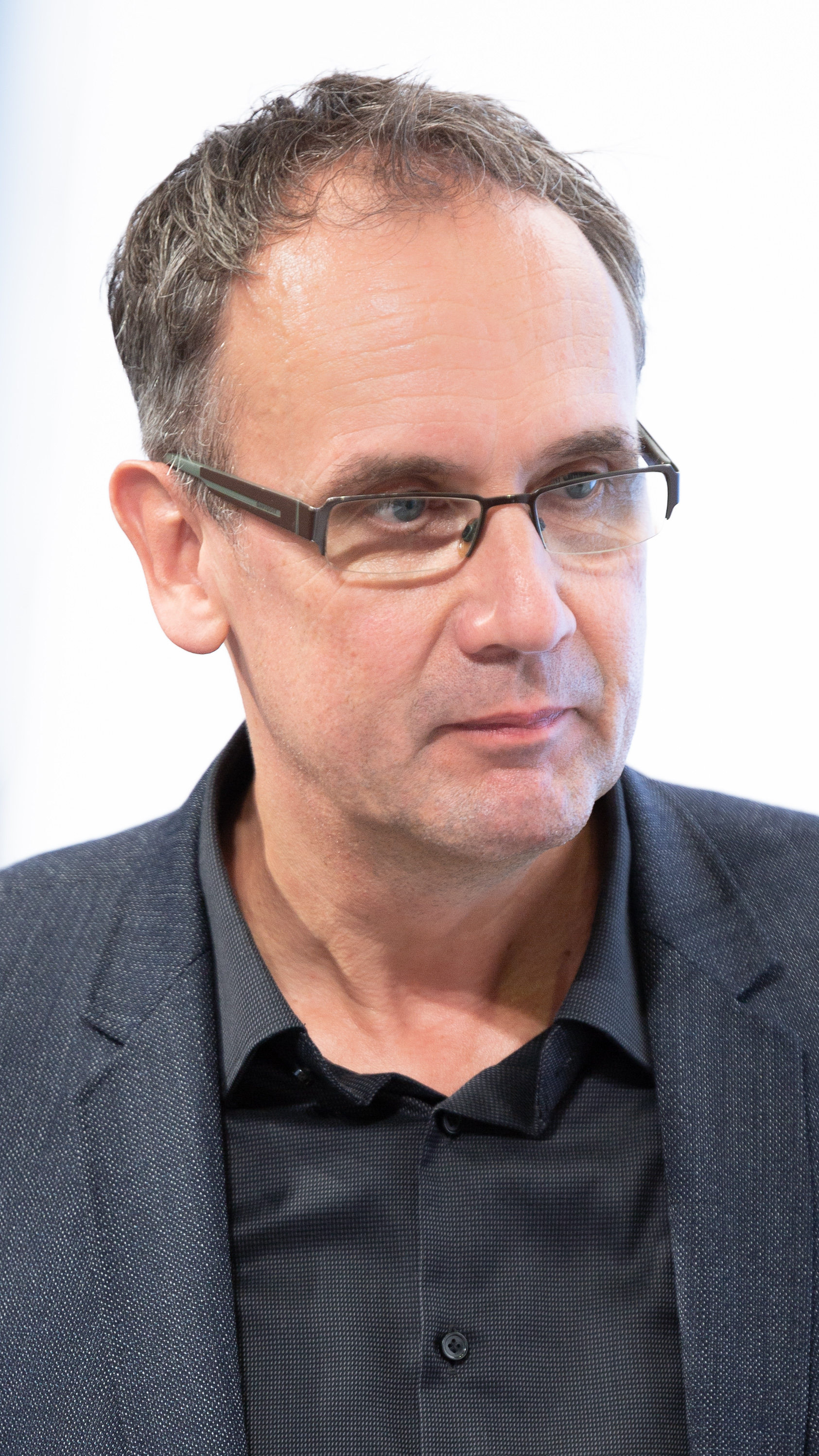
- Kutscher at the Frankfurt Book Fair 2018
- Born: 26 December 1962 (age 63); Lindlar
- Occupations: Novelist, screenwriter
- Writing career
- Language: German language
- Period: 1995–present
- Website: www.gereonrath.de

Volker Kutscher (German pronunciation: [ˈfɔlkɐ ˈkʊtʃɐ]; born 26 December 1962) is a German novelist, best known for his Berlin-based Gereon Rath crime series, which serves as the basis for the Sky thriller series Babylon Berlin.

== Biography ==
Kutscher was born on December 26, 1962, in Lindlar, North Rhine-Westphalia outside of Cologne, Germany. At university, Kutscher studied German, philosophy and history, and later worked as a newspaper editor prior to beginning his career as a novelist.

In 1996, Kutscher published his first crime novel Bullenmord, set in his native region Bergisches Land. He followed this with two other standalone books, published in 1998 and 2003, respectively.

Kutscher works as a full-time author and lives in Cologne.

=== Gereon Rath series ===
Inspired by his historical knowledge as well as The Sopranos, the 2002 gangster film Road to Perdition (set in 1931), and Fritz Lang's 1931 Berlin-based film M, Kutscher began working on the Gereon Rath series in the early 2000s. Set in the Weimar Republic, the series are meticulously researched and confront fictional as well as non-fictional characters. Of note, Kutscher's works are the first German crime novels set in the "golden" 1920s. The series was an instant hit in Germany and was awarded the Berlin Krimi-Fuchs Crime Writers Prize in 2011 and has sold over one million copies worldwide.

His award-winning Gereon Rath series, published by Kiepenheuer & Witsch, consists of ten novels, set one per year, beginning with Der nasse Fisch (2008), set in 1929. Der stumme Tod (2009) is set in 1930, Goldstein (2010) is set in 1931, Die Akte Vaterland (2012) is set in 1932, Märzgefallene (2014) is set in 1933, and Lunapark (2016) is set in 1934.

In 2017, Kutscher published Moabit, a short story set before the first Rath novel and portraying his partner Charlie's entrance to the world of criminal investigation. In 2018, he published the novel Marlow, set in 1935.

The eighth installment, Olympia, set in 1936, was released in Germany in November 2020. The ninth installment, Transatlantik, set in 1937, was published in Germany in October 2022. The tenth and final installment, Rath, set in 1938, was published in Germany in October 2024. The first five books in the series have been published in English by Sandstone Press, translated by Niall Sellar.

==== Television adaptation ====
In the mid-2010s, a writer-director team of Tom Tykwer, Achim von Borries and Hendrik Handloegten used Kutscher's novels as the basis for the show Babylon Berlin. The series premiered on October 13, 2017, on Sky 1, a German-language entertainment channel broadcast by Sky Deutschland. Netflix has released the first three seasons in the US, Canada, and Australia.

Seasons 1 and 2 are based loosely on the first book in the series. While the book shows mostly what Rath sees, the show shows the actual smuggled train, and many other differences. Season 3 draws material from Book 2, notably the plot line of an actress killed by a falling light, but has many other differences. Season 4 differs strongly in the portrayal of the visiting American gangster Goldstein.

The show has received many accolades and has brought Kutscher's books to an international audience. The show has received many awards including a Bambi in the category Beste Serie des Jahres (Best series of the year), four awards at the Deutscher Fernsehpreis, a Grimme-Preis, a Goldene Kamera for lead actor Volker Bruch. In December 2019, the European Film Academy awarded the series with the inaugural Achievement in Fiction Series Award at the European Film Awards.

== Bibliography ==
=== Novels ===
Gereon Rath series:

1. Der nasse Fisch, Kiepenheuer & Witsch, Cologne 2008, ISBN 978-3-462-04022-7.
  English translation: Babylon Berlin, Sandstone Press, Dingwall 2016, ISBN 978-1-910-124970, translated by Niall Sellar
2. Der stumme Tod, Kiepenheuer & Witsch, Cologne 2009, ISBN 978-3-462-04074-6.
  English translation: The Silent Death, Sandstone Press, Dingwall 2017, ISBN 978-1-910-985649, translated by Niall Sellar
3. Goldstein, Kiepenheuer & Witsch, Cologne 2010, ISBN 978-3-462-04238-2.
  English translation: Goldstein, Sandstone Press, Dingwall 2018, ISBN 978-1-912-240128, translated by Niall Sellar
4. Die Akte Vaterland, Kiepenheuer & Witsch, Cologne 2012, ISBN 978-3-462-04466-9.
  English translation: The Fatherland Files, Sandstone Press, Highland 2019, ISBN 978-1-912-240562, translated by Niall Sellar
5. Märzgefallene, Kiepenheuer & Witsch, Cologne 2014, ISBN 978-3-462-04707-3.
  English translation: The March Fallen, Sandstone Press, Highland 2020, ISBN 978-1-913-20704-5, translated by Niall Sellar
  - "Märchen mit Zündhölzern", Kiepenheuer & Witsch, Cologne 2016, short story, eBook exclusive
  - "Durchmarsch", Kiepenheuer & Witsch, Cologne 2016, short story, eBook exclusive
6. Lunapark, Kiepenheuer & Witsch, Cologne 2016, ISBN 978-3-462-04923-7.
  - "Plan B", Kiepenheuer & Witsch, Cologne 2016, short story, eBook exclusive
  - "Moabit", short story, prequel, Galiani, Berlin/Cologne 2017, ISBN 978-3-86971-155-3.
7. Marlow, Piper, Munich 2018, ISBN 978-3-492-05594-9.
8. Olympia, Piper, Munich 2020, ISBN 978-3-492-07059-1.
  - "Mitte", short story, Galiani, Berlin/Cologne 2021, ISBN 978-3-869-71246-8.
9. Transatlantik, Piper, Munich, 2022, ISBN 978-349-207177-2.
10. Rath, Piper, Munich, 2024, ISBN 978-3-492-07410-0.

Standalone:

- Bullenmord, Emons Verlag, Cologne 1995, ISBN 3-924491-87-9, with Christian Schnalke
- Vater unser, Emons Verlag, Cologne 1998, ISBN 3-89705-131-1, with Christian Schnalke
- Der schwarze Jakobiner, Emons Verlag, Cologne 2003, ISBN 3-89705-313-6

=== Comics ===
- Der nasse Fisch, Carlsen, Hamburg 2017, ISBN 978-3-551-78248-9, with Arne Jysch, adaptation of his homonymous novel

=== Scripts ===
- Ladylike – Jetzt erst recht! (2009), TV movie
- "Rot wie der Tod" (2010), episode of series Einsatz in Hamburg (2000–2013)
- Babylon Berlin (2017–26), TV series

== Adaptations ==
- Babylon Berlin (2017–26), series directed by Tom Tykwer, Achim von Borries and Hendrik Handloegten, based on Gereon Rath series
