= Manuel Cortez =

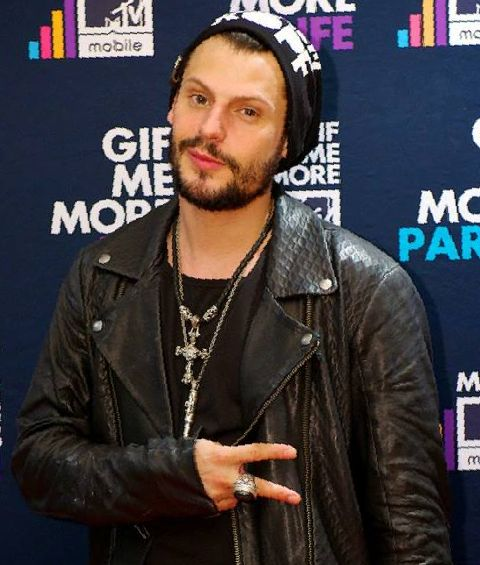
Manuel Cortez

Manuel Armando Cortez (born 24 May 1979 in Freiburg im Breisgau) is a German-Portuguese actor, creative director and photographer.

== Life and career ==
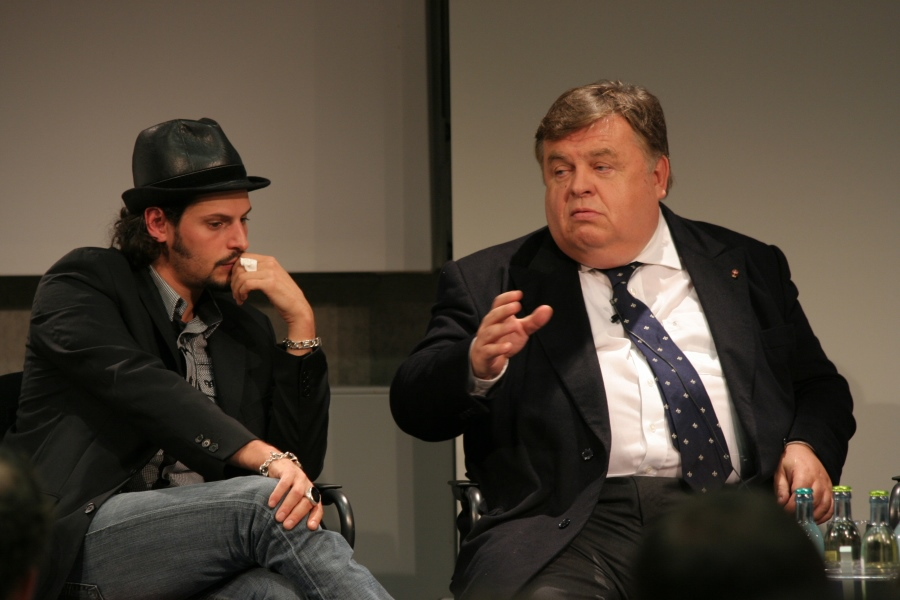
Manuel Cortez with Dr. Helmut Thoma

At the age of ten, he visited the children's drama school in Lisbon. Shortly after, he graduated from an acting and vocal training school. He also trained as a hairdresser and make-up artist with focus on special effects.

He has worked in films including Asudem (2007) by Daryush Shokof, Night of the Living Dorks (2004), A2 Racer (2004), and Do Fish Do It? (2002). One of his bigger roles was that of Rokko Kowalski in the Sat.1 program Verliebt in Berlin (2006). From 2011 to April 2012, he was seen in Anna und die Liebe as the male lead, Luca Benzoni.
