= Collien Fernandes =

German television presenter

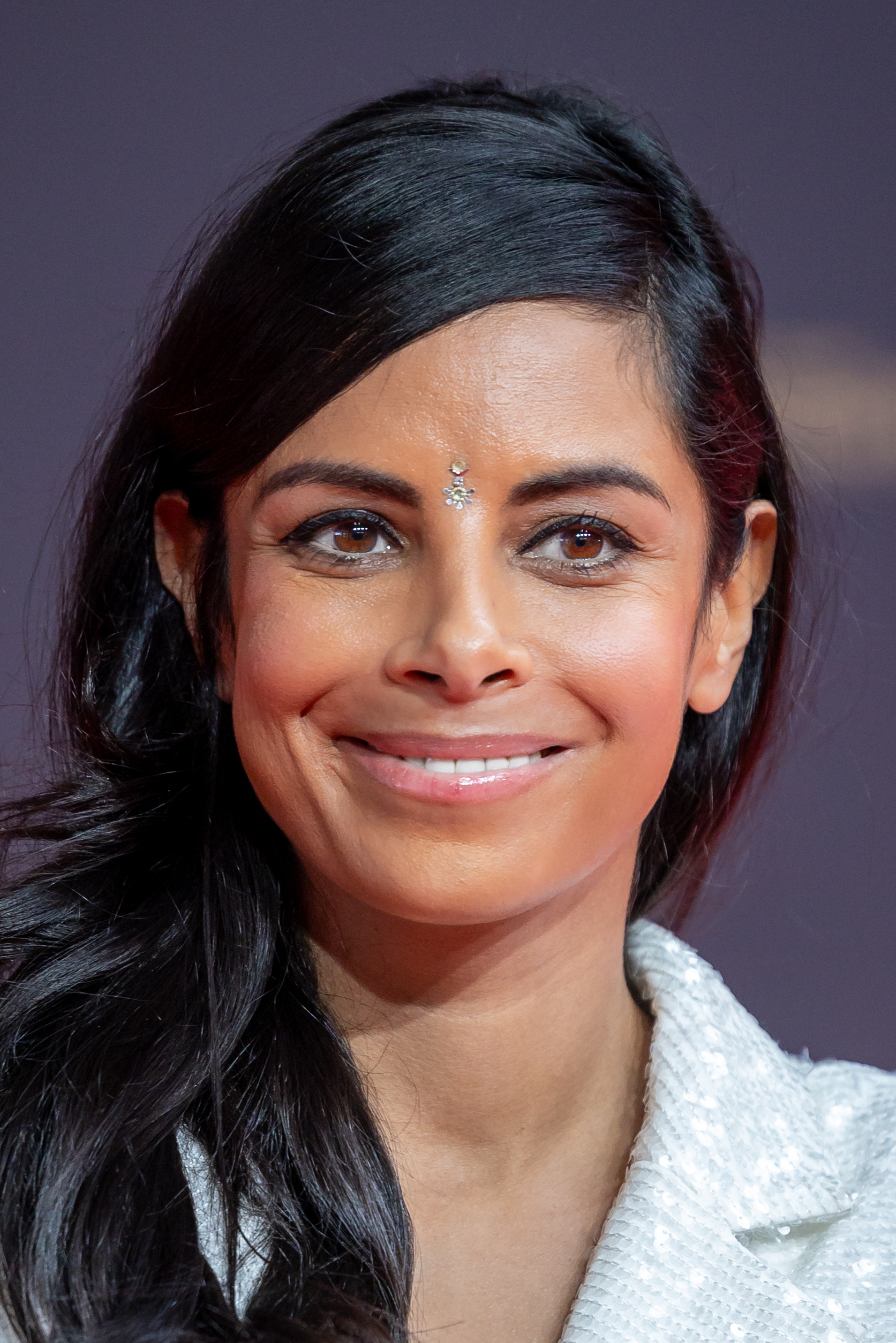
- Fernandes in 2024
- Born: Collien Monica Fernandes; 26 September 1981 (age 45); Hamburg, West Germany
- Other name: Collien Ulmen-Fernandes
- Occupations: TV presenter, actress
- Spouse: Christian Ulmen (m. 2011; div. 2026)
- Children: 1
- Website: www.collienulmenfernandes.de

Collien Monica Fernandes (previously Collien Ulmen-Fernandes; born 26 September 1981) is a German television presenter, VJ, and actress.

== Early life ==
Fernandes was born in Hamburg to an Indian father of Portuguese and Indian descent and a Hungarian German mother. She grew up with her little sister in Schenefeld. At age 15, she moved out from home to begin her career as a model. Fernandes was interested in music and started singing with the band Yam Yam. She went to dance schools in Hamburg and London.

== Career ==
Fernandes featured in a number of music videos as background dancer for artists such as Enrique Iglesias and Dieter Bohlen's band Modern Talking. Producers took note of this, and she soon signed a record contract with BMG.

Fernandes began her TV career in 2000 presenting a number of shows and in the autumn of 2001 became the new presenter of Bravo TV on RTL2. This followed with guest appearances on The Dome and TV total. Since 2003, she has been a presenter of a number of shows on the music television channel VIVA and DSF's Maxim TV.

In February 2004, Fernandes appeared in her first movie A2 Racer. That same year, she appeared in Night of the Living Dorks. In 2007, she appeared in two more films, namely Ossi's Eleven and Instructor Schmidt, in which she played the leading female role. In 2007, she was nominated along with the rest of the cast from the new Sat.1 series Dr. Molly & Karl for an Adolf Grimme Award. And in 2009 she starred in the RTL show Alarm for Cobra 11 – The Highway Police. Since the beginning of June 2009, Fernandes has been the presenter of the ProSieben show MyVideoStar.

In September 2009, Fernandes was ejected from the Internationale Funkausstellung Berlin for asking Lady Gaga during a press conference whether she had a penis or a vagina.

=== Modelling ===
Fernandes has modelled for a number of companies, including Otto, Neckermann and BeeDees. She has also been in television advertisements for Ferrero's Kinder Bueno and Mercedes-Benz.

Fernandes was elected "Woman of the Year" in 2003 and 2006 by the readers of the German Maxim. She has also appeared in other editions of Maxim – in Russia, Spain, Ukraine and the United States. In 2010, she was elected "Sexiest Woman in the World" by the readers of the German FHM magazine.

== Personal life ==
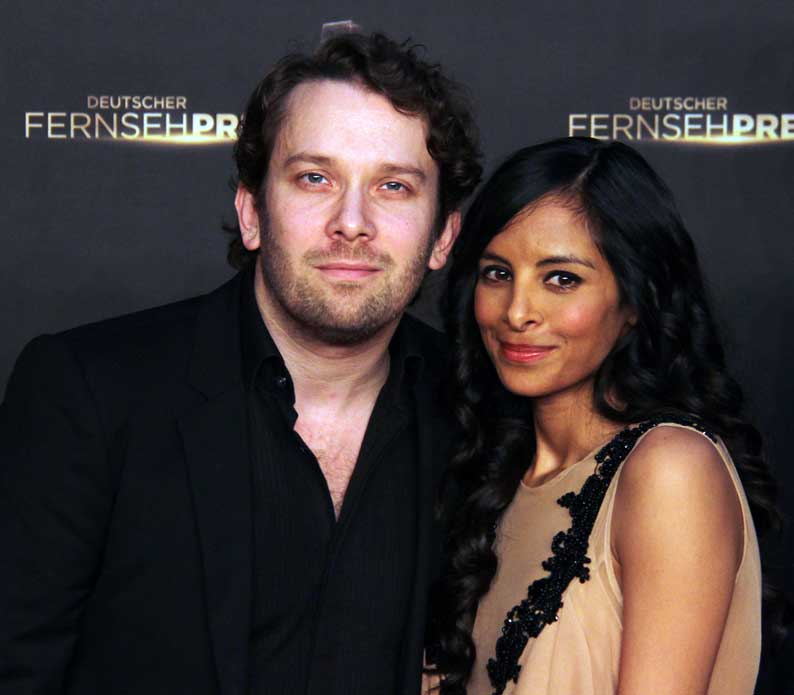
Fernandes with her ex-husband Christian Ulmen in 2012

Fernandes met German actor Christian Ulmen in August 2010 and the couple wed on 22 June 2011. Their daughter was born in April 2012. In 2023, the family moved from Potsdam to Mallorca. In September 2025, the couple announced their separation, and in March 2026, their divorce. Since the separation, Fernandes has been appearing in public as Collien Monica Fernandes.

In March 2026, Der Spiegel reported that Fernandes had filed a complaint against her ex-husband Ulmen with the district court in Palma, alleging, among other things, identity-theft, public defamation, and assault. He is alleged to have created fake social media accounts in her name over the course of several years to distribute fake nude photos and videos of her; she felt "virtually raped". Ulmen hired media lawyer Christian Schertz to take legal action against Der Spiegel. Schertz considers the reporting unlawful because it spreads "untrue facts based on a one-sided account". Without commenting on the validity of the allegations in this specific case, Federal Minister of Justice Stefanie Hubig, in response to the publication of the allegations against Ulmen, spoke out about existing gaps in criminal liability and called for harsher punishment for perpetrators of digital violence.

== Allegations against Christian Ulmen ==
In March 2026, Der Spiegel reported that Fernandes had filed a criminal complaint against Ulman with a court in Palma. She accused him of creating fake social media profiles in her name over several years and using them to distribute pornographic content and of physical assault. She described the conduct as "virtual rape", though Ulmen denies the allegations and is presumed innocent. Ulmen's lawyers, Christian Schertz and Simon Bergmann applied to the Regional Court of Hamburg for an injunction Der Spiegel's publisher. On 7 May 2026 the court rejected four of the five requests and granted one relating to a passage about the proceedings in Spain.

On appeal, the Hanseatic Higher Regional Court ruled in June 2026 the Der Spiegel could not give rise to the suspicion that Ulmen had produced or distributed deepfake videos of Fernandes, finding the minimum evidentiary was lacking. It also barred the magazine from quoting from an email Ulmen sent to his defense lawyer, but upheld the lower's court decision on the remaining reporting including the violence allegations. Ulmen's lawyers said the deepfake suspicion had contributed to undifferentiated public debate and to a "high degree of prejudgment" about their client.

A court in Palma transferred the criminal case to Germany. Jurisdiction lies with the public prosecutor's office in Potsdam, where the couple lived before moving to Mallorca in 2023. The office opened an investigation in May 2026 into the assault allegations, relating to incidents said to have occurred in Spain in 2022 and 2023, and began examining separately whether the allegations of digital violence gave rise to an initial suspicion of an offence. In October 2026 the prosecutor's office said the investigation was continuing because Fernandes had not yet supplied the evidence she had announced, and that her questioning had not been completed. Fernandes said a change of lawyers had required documents to be resubmitted and that her lawyers had been since sent them.

== Reaction and legislation ==
After the allegations became public, Federal Justice Minister Stefanie Hubig said, without commenting on the case itself, that there were gaps in criminal liability for digital violence. Her ministry had been preparing a bill on the subject since 2025, the case accelerated its completion. A draft law creating new offenses including for sexualised deepfakes, was presented on 17 April 2026, and approved by the federal cabinet on 7 October 2026. Demonstrations in support of Fernandes and against digital sexualised violence were held in several German cities. The streaming service Joyn removed the series "Jerks", in which Fernandes and Ulmen played a divorced couple, and the pharmacy chain shop Apotheke paused an advertising campaign featuring both.
