= Fatherland (2026 film) =

2026 film by Paweł Pawlikowski

- Polish theatrical release poster
- Directed by: Paweł Pawlikowski
- Screenplay by: Paweł Pawlikowski; Hendrik Handloegten
- Produced by: Lorenzo Gangarossa; Dimitri Rassam; Edward Berger; Jeanne Tremsal; Ewa Puszczyńska; Mario Gianani; Lorenzo Mieli
- Starring: Sandra Hüller; Hanns Zischler; August Diehl
- Cinematography: Łukasz Żal
- Edited by: Paweł Pawlikowski; Piotr Wójcik
- Production companies: Our Films; Extreme Emotions; Nine Hours; Chapter2
- Distributed by: Kino Świat (Poland); Neue Visionen (Germany); Mubi (Italy); Pathé (France)
- Release dates: 14 May 2026 (Cannes); 19 June 2026 (Poland); 3 September 2026 (Germany); 16 October 2026 (Italy); 2 December 2026 (France)
- Running time: 82 minutes
- Countries: Poland; Germany; Italy; France
- Languages: German; English; French; Russian
- Budget: €10 million ($11.7m)
- Box office: $8.41 million

Fatherland is a 2026 fictionalized biographical film directed by Paweł Pawlikowski, who co-wrote the screenplay with Hendrik Handloegten. The film stars Sandra Hüller and Hanns Zischler as Erika and Thomas Mann, respectively, who embark on a road trip across Germany in 1949. It is the third entry in Pawlikowski's trilogy of historical films, following Ida (2013) and Cold War (2018).

The film had its world premiere in the main competition at the 79th Cannes Film Festival on 14 May 2026, where Pawlikowski won the Best Director award. (Note: Tied with Javier Calvo and Javier Ambrossi for La bola negra.) The film received widespread critical acclaim, with particular praise for its direction, cinematography, and performances. It was theatrically released in Poland by Kino Świat on 19 June 2026.

Fatherland was selected as the Polish entry for Best International Feature Film at the 99th Academy Awards.

== Plot ==
In summer 1949, Klaus Mann calls his sister Erika from an apartment in Cannes, where he shares his dissatisfaction with his writing and contemporary art as a whole. Erika invites him to join her and their father, Thomas Mann, a famed German writer in exile, on a trip to Frankfurt, where Thomas will give a speech and receive a Goethe Prize. Klaus promises to think about it.

Arriving in West Germany, Erika intercepts anonymous letters accusing Thomas of being a traitor to his fatherland. At a press gallery session, with Erika serving as Thomas's translator, it is revealed that he will receive a second Goethe Prize in Weimar. Journalists argue that Thomas will likely be persecuted upon his return to the United States, where he has been living for the past ten years, should he visit East Germany. Thomas replies that Goethe's work and German literature predates the country's separation, and that art does not recognize borders.

At a reception following the ceremony, Thomas is met by two grandsons of Richard Wagner, who ask if he can help rehabilitate the image of the Bayreuth Festival, which he refuses. At the reception's bar, Erika encounters her ex-husband Gustaf Gründgens, a German actor and General Director who became closely affiliated with Hermann Göring, the second most powerful man in Nazi Germany. The two have a brief altercation that ends with Erika slapping him in front of other patrons. Returning to her father's hotel room, she discovers that her brother Klaus has committed suicide. Nevertheless, Thomas insists on continuing the journey as planned.

Arriving in Weimar, the two receive a welcome procession by Johannes R. Becher, a high-ranking cultural official, and Sergei Tiulpanov, director of the Propaganda Administration of the Soviet Military Administration in Germany (SMAD). They have put together a packed programme featuring several banquets, all accompanied by music, including a children's choir singing Becher's "Auferstanden aus Ruinen" ("Risen from Ruins"), conceived as a pan-German national anthem with the repeated line "Deutschland…Vaterland (Germany…Fatherland)". At their hotel room, a dissident begs Thomas to publicly condemn the SMAD for detaining political prisoners at the former Buchenwald concentration camp, only for the man to be taken away by two SMAD representatives. Erika explores the grounds surrounding their accommodation on her own, leaving Thomas to attend several events by himself. Thomas returns to the hotel to find Erika crying and mourning Klaus.

The next day, on their way back to Frankfurt, Erika and Thomas drive past a bombed-out church, which they decide to investigate on their own. Walking into the ruins, they find two men tuning an organ. As they listen to them perform Bach's "Jesu, Joy of Man's Desiring", Thomas begins to weep while Erika holds his hand.

== Cast ==
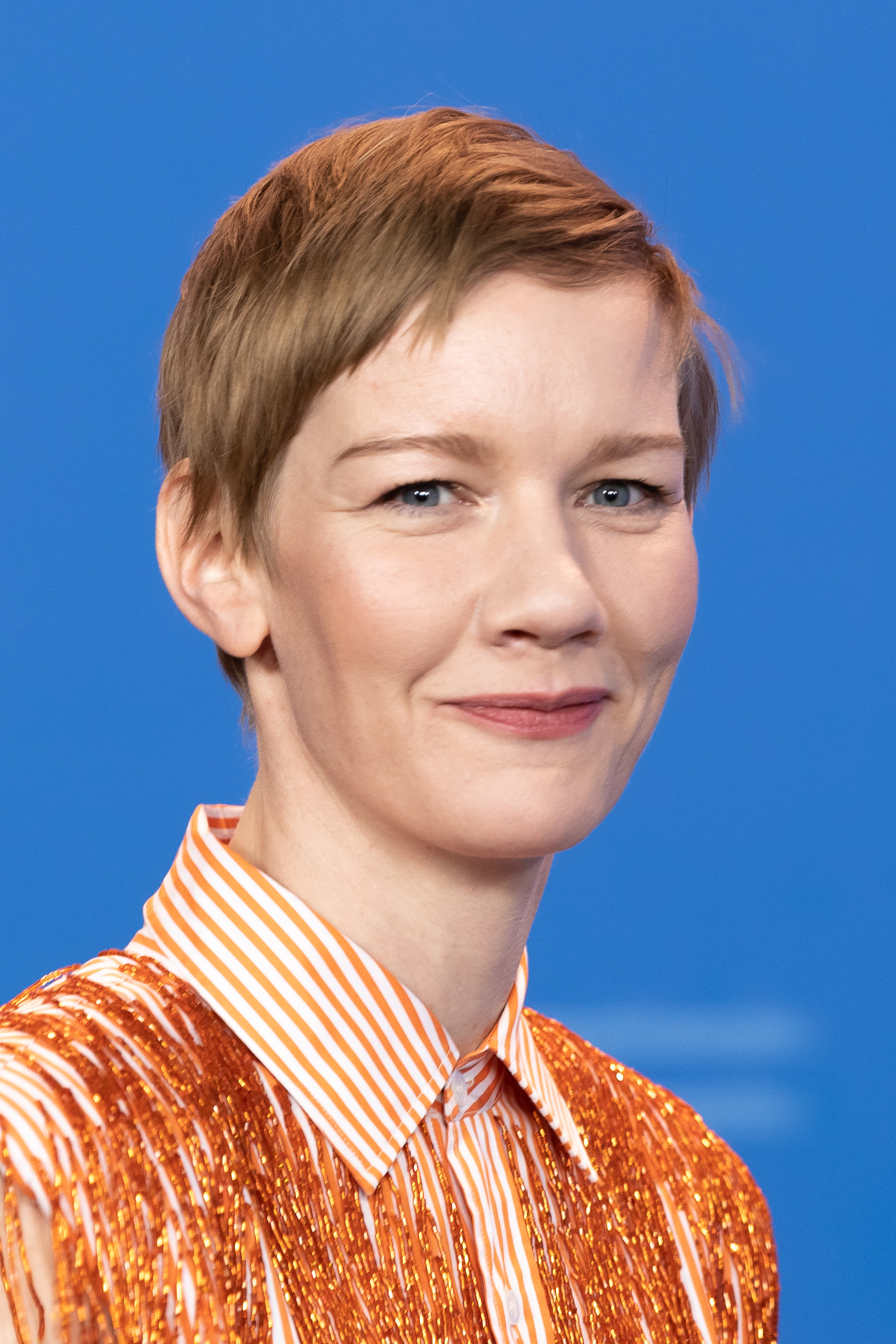
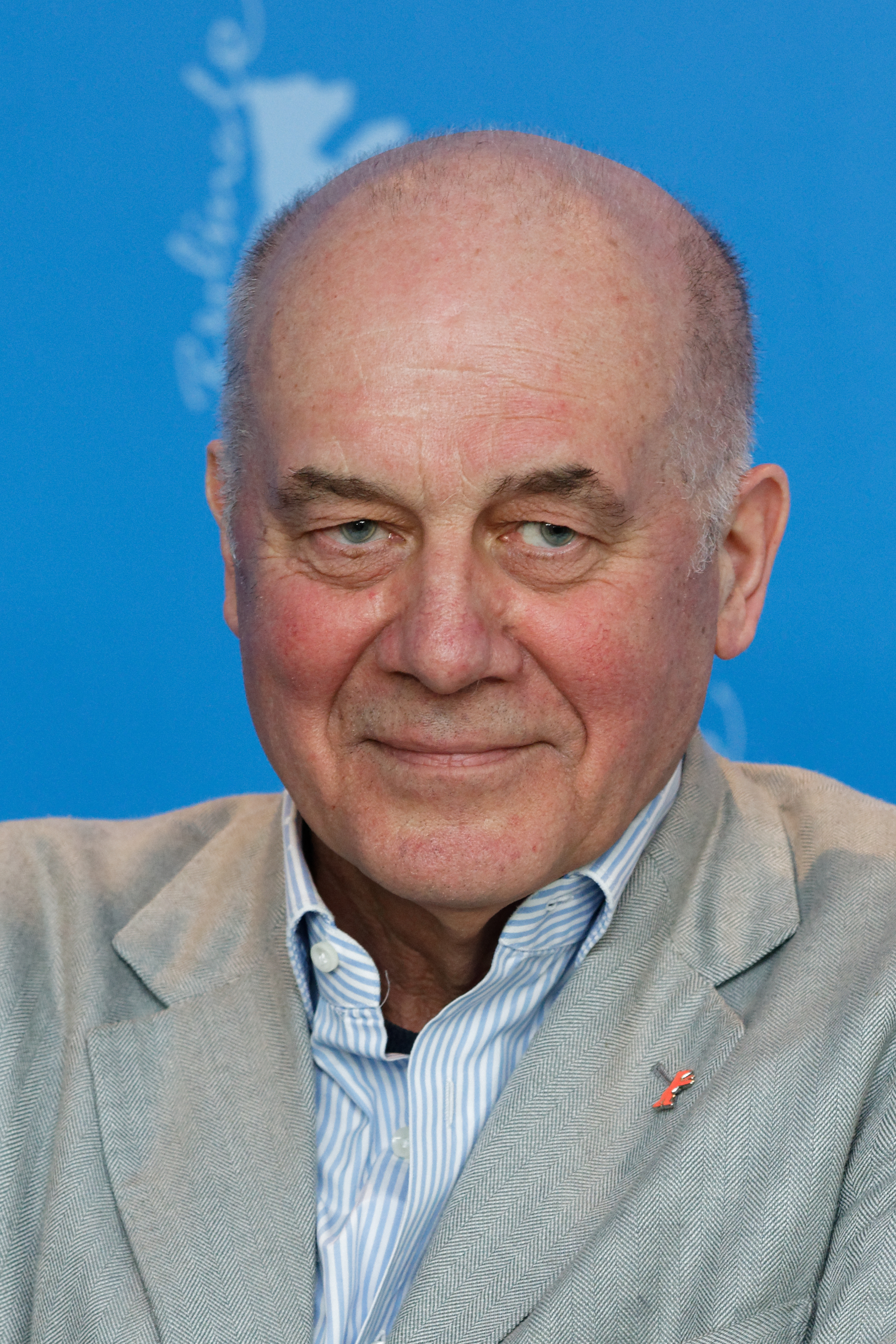
Sandra Hüller (left) and Hanns Zischler (right) portray Erika and Thomas Mann, respectively.
- Sandra Hüller as Erika Mann
- Hanns Zischler as Thomas Mann
- August Diehl as Klaus Mann
- Devid Striesow as Johannes R. Becher
- Anna Madeley as Betty Knox
- David Menkin as Arthur Quint
- Joachim Meyerhoff as Gustaf Gründgens
- Enno Trebs as Wieland Wagner
- Theo Trebs as Wolfgang Wagner
- Waldemar Kobus as Walter Kolb, mayor of Frankfurt
- Daniel Wagner as Sergei Tiulpanov
- Fritzi Haberlandt as a waitress
- Milan Peschel as Armin Schaufelberger
- Joanna Kulig as a jazz singer

== Production ==
=== Development ===
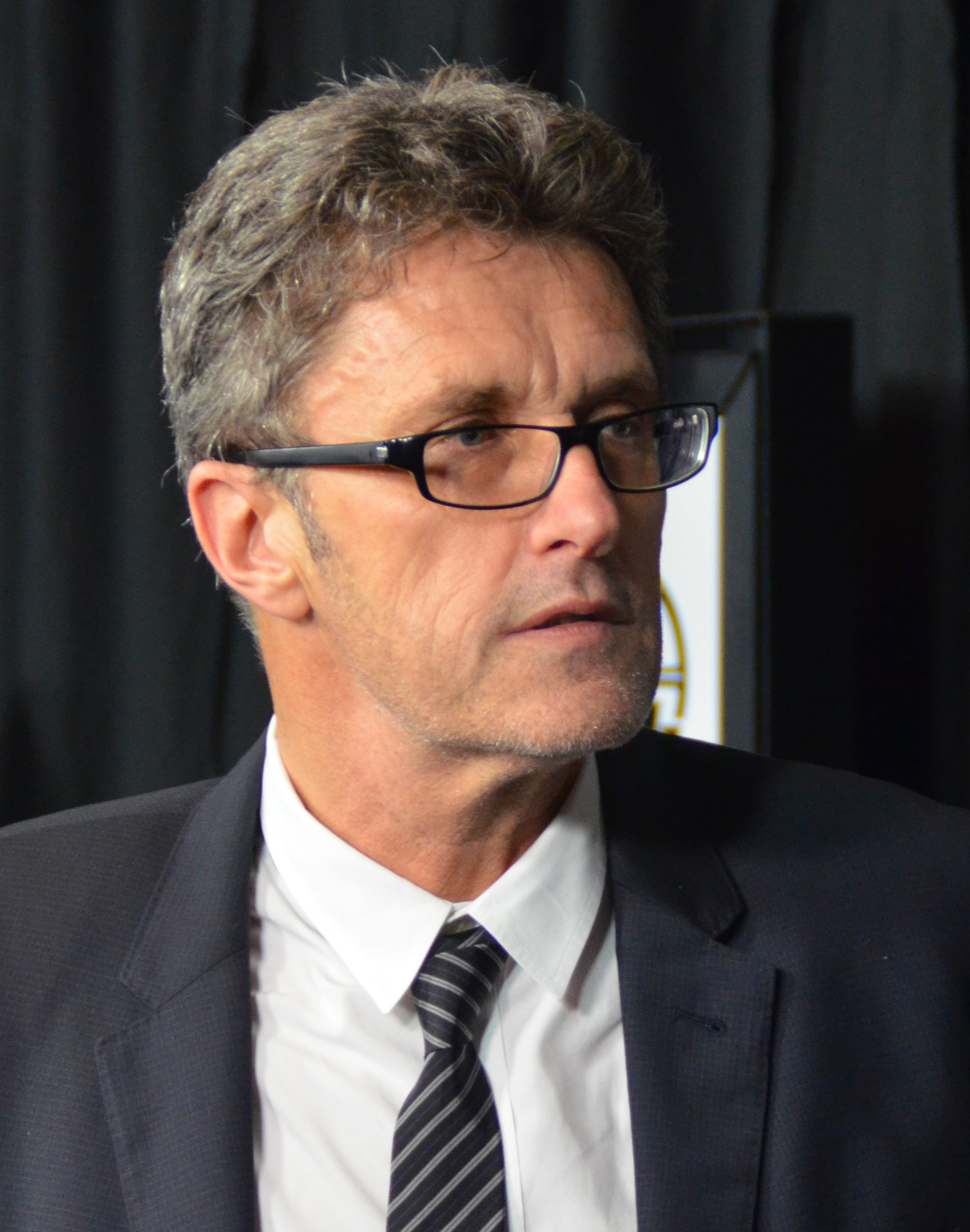
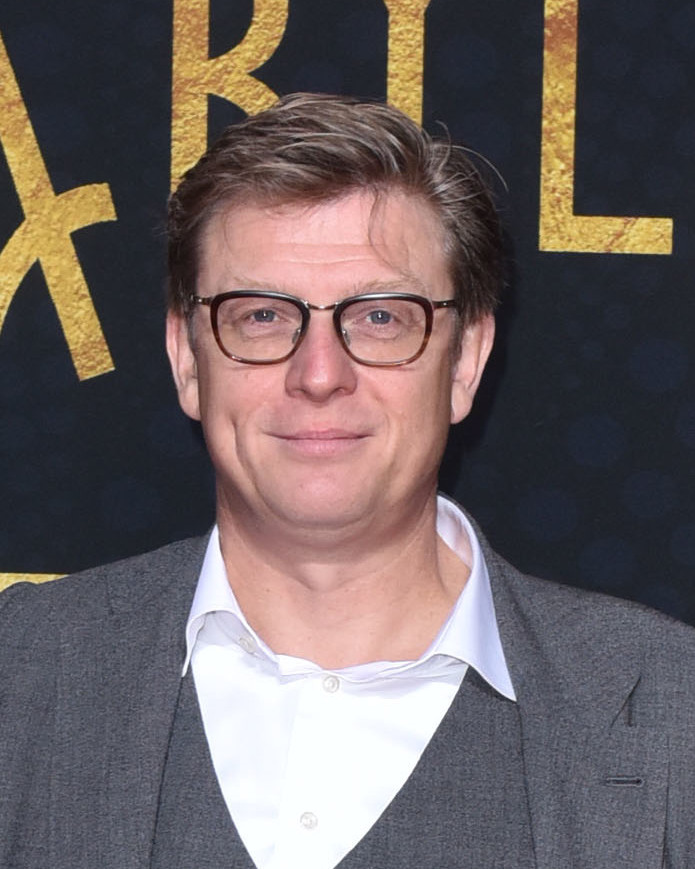
Director Paweł Pawlikowski (left) co-wrote the screenplay with Hendrik Handloegten (right).

Director Paweł Pawlikowski was sent The Magician, Colm Tóibín's biographical novel about Thomas Mann, by Mario Gianani and Lorenzo Mieli of Our Films, but he turned down the opportunity to adapt the book into a film. Instead, inspired by one particular episode — Mann's return to Germany in 1949 — he proceeded to re-imagine the event, co-writing the screenplay with Hendrik Handloegten. Pawlikowski sees the film as the final part of his trilogy of historical films, following Ida (2013) and Cold War (2018). He later noted the film as "the quickest thing that [he] ever developed".

The film marks the first project under a three-year co-production, financing, and distribution agreement between Mubi and Our Films. In June 2025, Arte France Cinéma was announced as a co-producer of the film. Canal+ Poland also served as a co-producer. The producers are listed as Mario Gianani, Lorenzo Mieli, Ewa Puszczyńska, Jeanne Tremsal, Edward Berger, Lorenzo Gangarossa, and Dimitri Rassam.

In February 2025, the film was awarded a grant of €200,000 by the Hessen Film Fund. Later that year, it was awarded a grant of €1.42 million by the Polish Film Institute and €150,000 from Eurimages. It also received funding from the Polish Ministry of Culture and National Heritage, the Medienboard Berlin-Brandenburg, and the Mitteldeutsche Medienförderung.

=== Casting ===
Sandra Hüller, Hanns Zischler, August Diehl, Anna Madeley, Devid Striesow, and Theo Trebs were announced as cast members on 19 August 2025. In November 2025, Joanna Kulig announced that she had taken part in the film, marking her fourth collaboration with Pawlikowski.

=== Filming ===
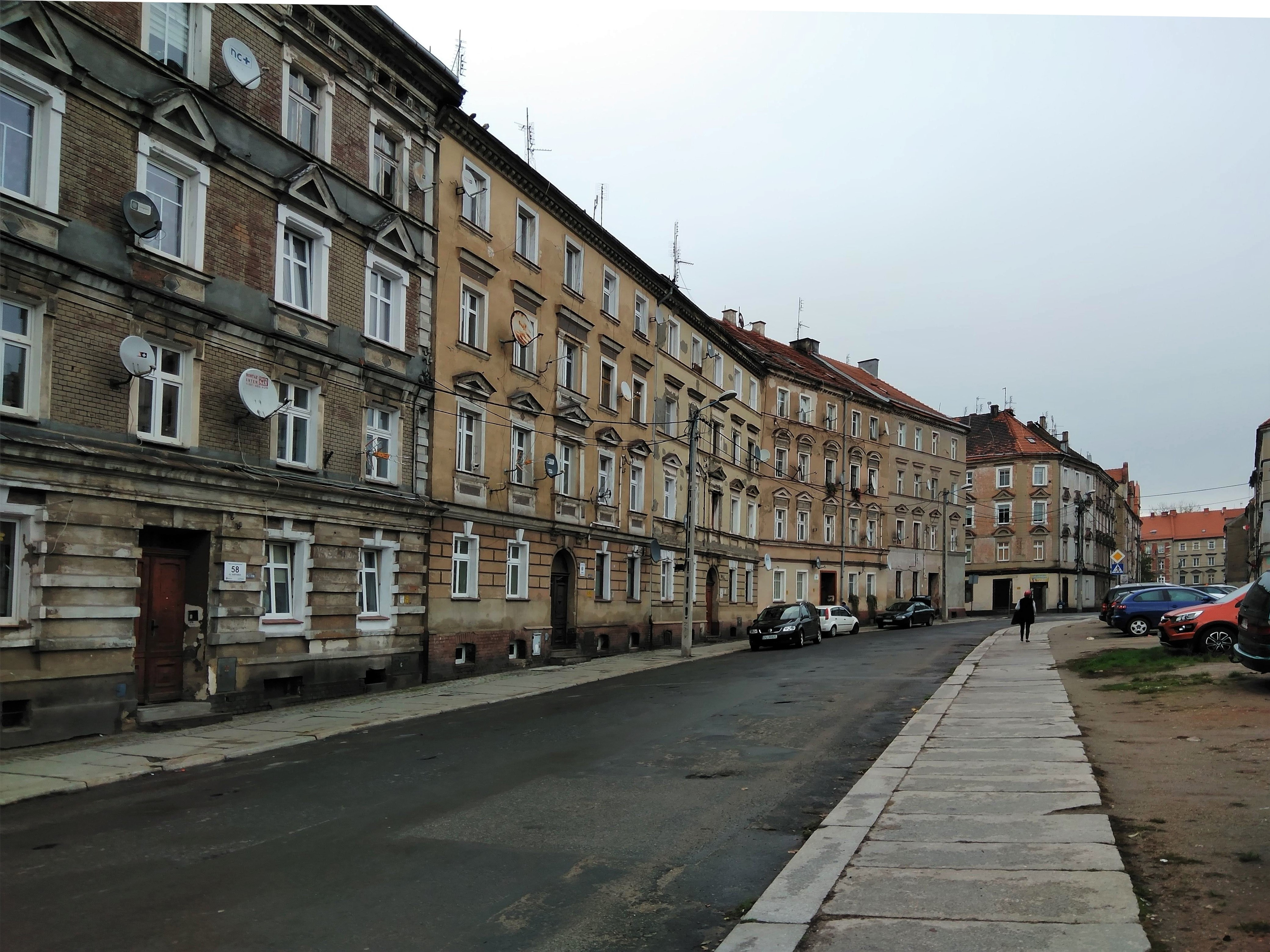
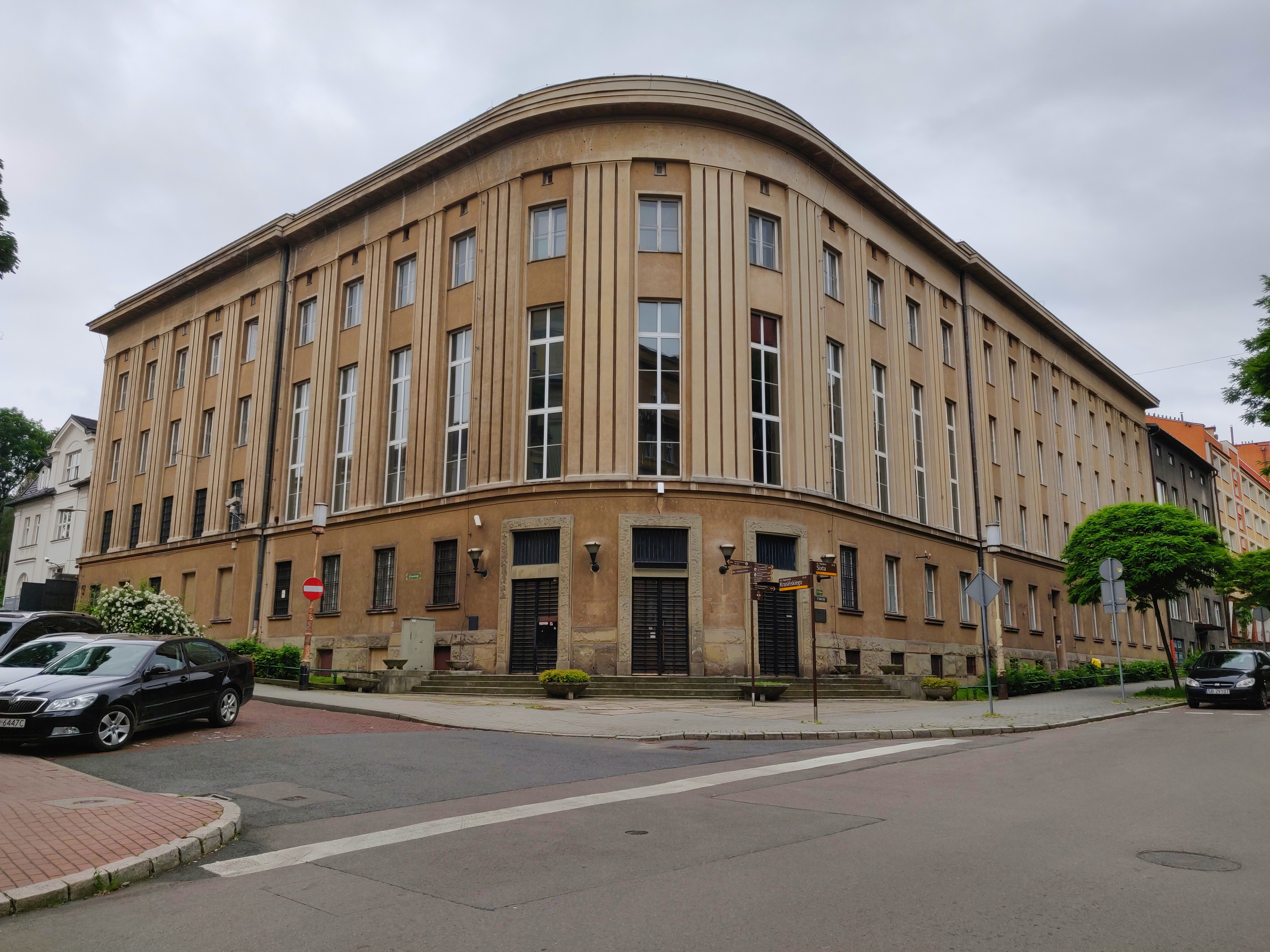
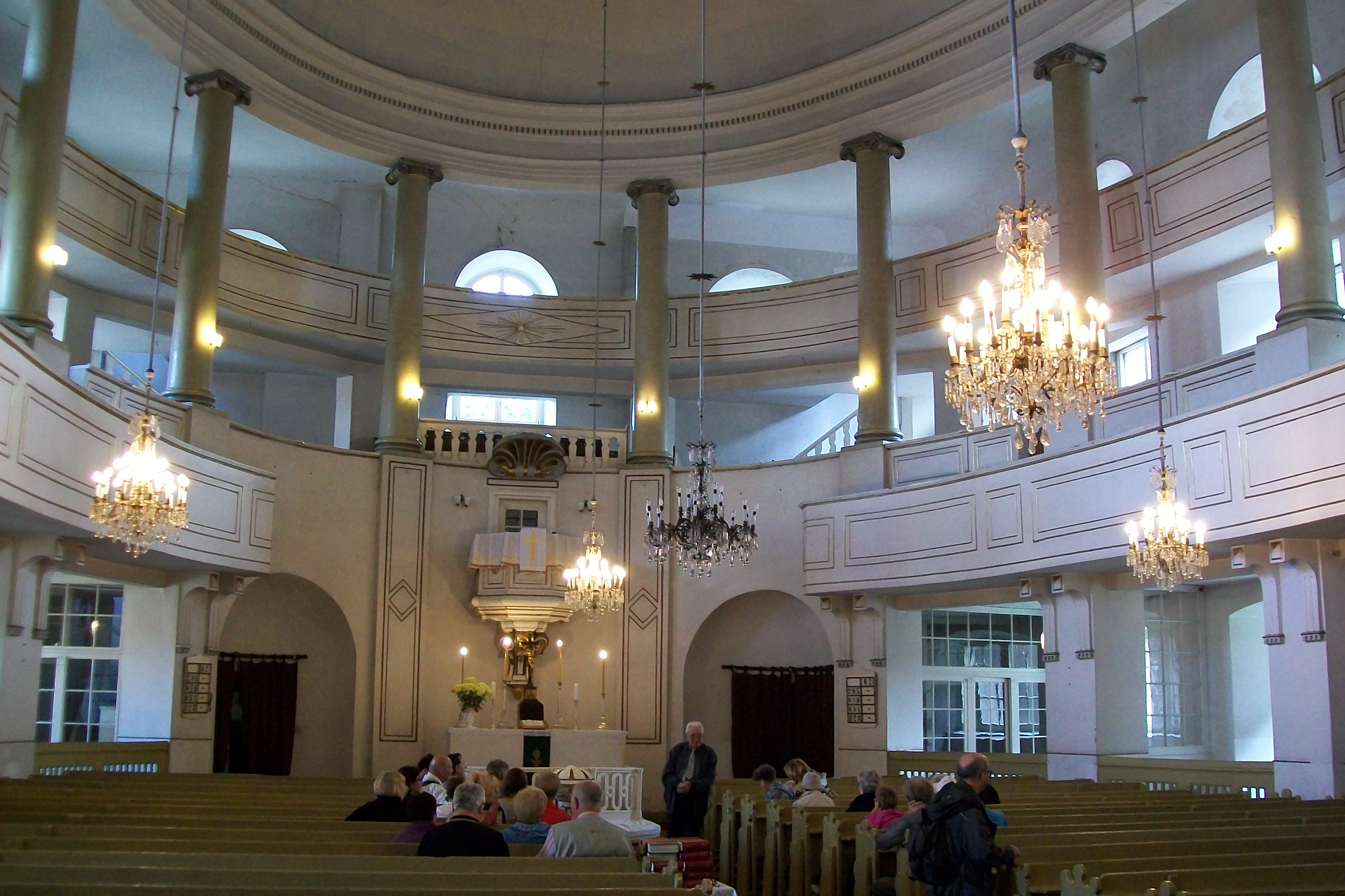
The film was shot primarily in Poland. Filming locations included Legnica (top), Bielsko-Biała (middle), and the Church of the Saviour in Wałbrzych (bottom).

Łukasz Żal served as the film's cinematographer, having previously shot Pawlikowski's films Ida (2013) and Cold War (2018). Like Ida and Cold War, the film was shot in black-and-white. It was also shot mostly chronologically, as producer Ewa Puszczyńska stated that "it was very important [for the] cast to get into the performance, into the journey, into the trip."

Although the film is set in Germany, the production team opted to film primarily in Poland due to budget constraints. As Pawlikowski prefers not to film on stages, he scouted locations extensively throughout the country, and sets were built to match the surrounding areas. Puszczyńska stated, "There was no location which [was just] getting in and shooting. We were building the set on the street to match the existing buildings."

Principal photography began in the Kartuzy district of Legnica on 13 August 2025. Later that month, filming moved to Bielsko-Biała and Cieszyn. In early September, filming briefly took place in Warsaw before returning to Legnica. On 30 September, filming took place in Weimar, specifically at the Deutsches Nationaltheater und Staatskapelle Weimar and Goethes Gartenhaus in Park an der Ilm. In early October, filming began at the Feature Film Studio in Wrocław. Later that month, filming took place at the Church of the Saviour in Wałbrzych. Filming locations also included Pieńsk, Goszcz, Bielawa, and Kliczków Castle. Filming was completed by mid-December 2025, after 38 days of shooting.

To recreate the Thomas Mann House, production designers Marcel Sławiński and Katarzyna Sobańska visited the site itself and studied blueprints, photos, and video footage of the home. Furniture and props were sourced from Germany for authenticity. Pawlikowski also wanted the villa to be filled with books and art to emphasize "the quintessence of [Mann's] world: culture, literature, music."

Costume designer Aleksandra Staszko, who had worked with Pawlikowski on Ida and Cold War, recreated 1940s fashion for the film, which required her to emphasize the style differences between West and East Germany, as well as the United States. While the costumes for the main characters were custom-made, costumes for extras were sourced from warehouses in Berlin, Łódź, and Warsaw.

=== Post-production ===
The film was edited by Piotr Wójcik and the score was by Marcin Masecki.

== Release ==
The Match Factory owns the international sales rights to the film, which was presented at the European Film Market in February 2026. Kino Świat will distribute the film in Poland, while Mubi will distribute the film in North America, Latin America, the United Kingdom, Ireland, Germany, Austria, the Benelux, Italy, Spain, Turkey, Australia, New Zealand, and India. It will also be released by Pathé in France, Neue Visionen in Germany, and Polyfilm in Austria. Mubi signed an agreement for Madman Entertainment to distribute the film in Australia and New Zealand.

The film had its world premiere in the main competition of the 79th Cannes Film Festival on 14 May 2026, where it competed for the Palme d'Or. Ahead of its premiere, Mubi released a first-look clip from the film. It was screened at the 73rd Sydney Film Festival in June 2026, where it played in the Official Competition. It opened the 32nd Sarajevo Film Festival on 14 August 2026. It had its North American premiere at the 53rd Telluride Film Festival. It was also selected for screenings at the 74th San Sebastián International Film Festival in September 2026, in the Main Slate of the 2026 New York Film Festival, and at the Adelaide Film Festival on 18 October 2026.

In late May 2026, following its Cannes premiere, the film was acquired for distribution by Nonstop Entertainment in Scandinavia, Spentzos Film in Greece, GAGA in Japan, Challan in South Korea, Andrews Film in Taiwan, Lev Cinemas in Israel, Cinelibri in Bulgaria, MegaCom Film in former Yugoslavia, Vertigo Média in Hungary, Zero Gravity in the Czech Republic and Slovakia, Arthouse Traffic in Ukraine, Gulf Film in the Middle East and North Africa, Nitrato in Portugal, Edko Films in Hong Kong, Transilvania Film in Romania, and Kino Pavasaris in the Baltics.

A trailer was released on 28 May 2026. On 15 June 2026, the film had its premiere screening at the Palace of Culture and Science in Warsaw. It received a theatrical release in Poland on 19 June 2026. The film will then release in Germany on 3 September, in Italy on 16 October, and in France on 2 December. It will screen in Australian cinemas from 12 November 2026. The film had its Turkish premiere on 6 September 2026 as part of Mubi Fest.

== Reception ==
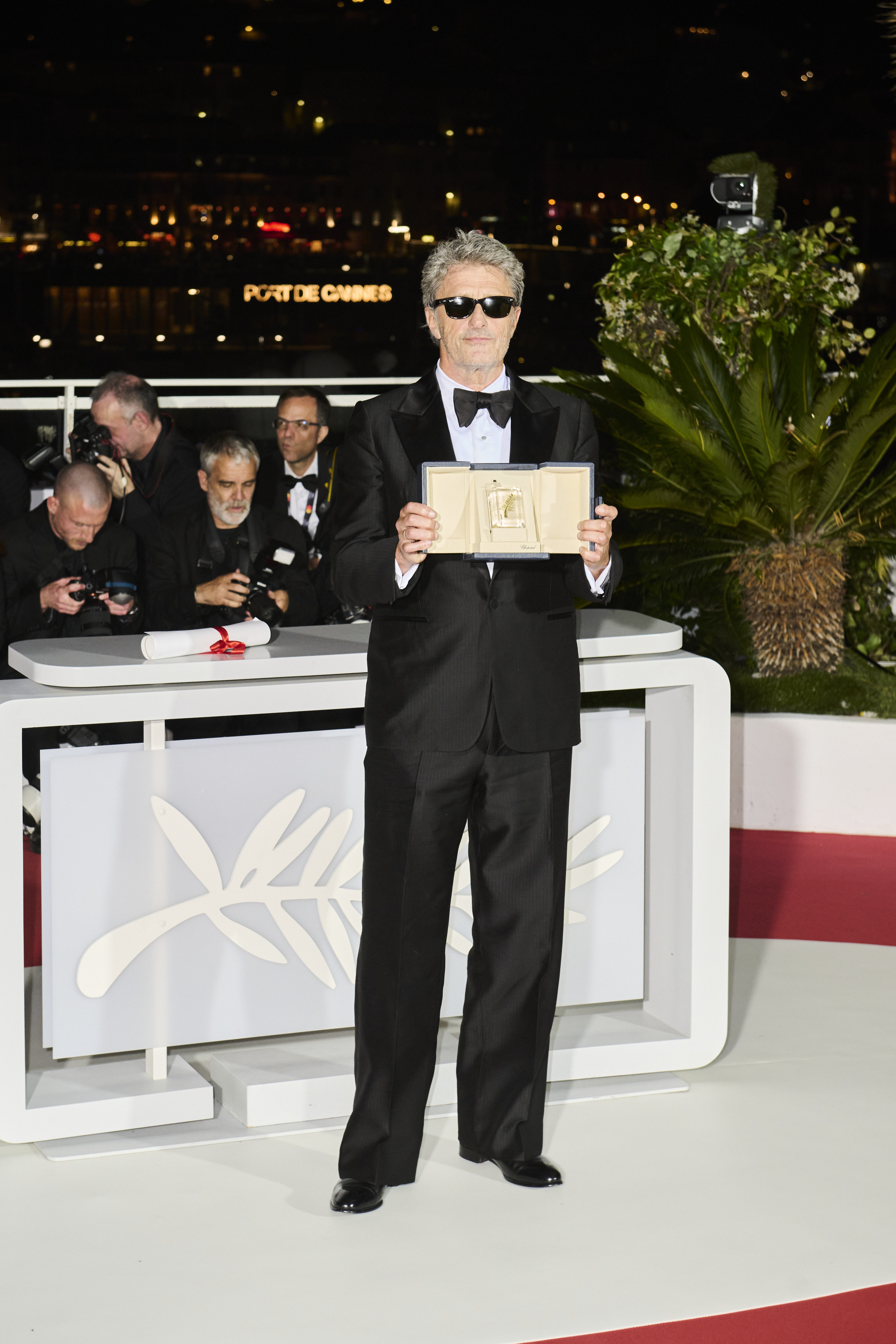
Paweł Pawlikowski received the Award for Best Director at the 2026 Cannes Film Festival.

=== Critical response ===
On the review aggregator website Rotten Tomatoes, 93% of 141 critics' reviews are positive, with an average rating of 8.0/10. The website's consensus reads: "Pairing Hanns Zischler and Sandra Hüller in a quietly compelling father-daughter dynamic, Fatherland continues director Paweł Pawlikowski's exploration of post-WWII Europe with characteristic intelligence and refinement." Metacritic, which uses a weighted average, assigned the film a score of 86 out of 100, based on 38 critics, indicating "universal acclaim".

In his five-star review, Peter Bradshaw of The Guardian deemed the film "an impossibly elegant, poised historical vignette". Kevin Maher of The Times also gave the film a five-star rating, describing it as "small but perfectly formed and packed with more ideas and infused with more heartbreak than most overlong arthouse epics". Robbie Collin of The Daily Telegraph gave the film a rating of four stars out of five, calling it "sharp, exacting, trenchant, and fascinating". He specifically commended Pawlikowski's craftsmanship and Żal's cinematography as "impeccable".

Manohla Dargis of The New York Times wrote that the film "is suffused with its characters’ longing, with desires that they express and others they can’t. There’s pathos in some of their words, though often it is what remains unsaid that hits hardest." Polish critic Bartosz Staszczyszyn by contrast argued that the film "is a piece of purely intellectual cinema", in contrast to the preceding titles of the trilogy which had "emotional content" derived from "narrative formulas" which "universalised the stories".

Giving the film a B-grade, Ryan Lattanzio of IndieWire wrote, "What exactly the endgame of this road trip is doesn't quite crystallize onscreen, leaving gaps and missing bookends that might encourage you to brush up on your European postwar history." Brian Tallerico of RogerEbert.com echoed this sentiment, noting, "There are no easy answers in Fatherland, which makes it a bit less satisfying narratively, but I think also means it will have the freedom to bounce around in the minds of viewers more than a film concerned with tighter conclusions."

Critics praised the cast's performances, including Leslie Felperin of The Hollywood Reporter, who believed Hüller and Zischler's roles were "immaculately performed", and Owen Gleiberman of Variety, who deemed them "pitch-perfect". Critics also praised the film's artistic direction, with Stephanie Bunbury of Deadline calling the film "a masterclass in artistic discipline" and Marc van de Klashorst of the International Cinephile Society writing that "[Pawlikowski's] compositional work is nothing short of brilliant, especially in the crisp imagery created by his regular cinematographer Łukasz Żal".

=== Accolades ===
At the 39th European Film Awards, Fatherland led with 11 nominations.

Award	Date of ceremony	Category	Recipient(s)	Result	Ref.
Cannes Film Festival	23 May 2026	Palme d'Or	Paweł Pawlikowski	Nominated	
Cannes Film Festival	23 May 2026	Best Director	Paweł Pawlikowski	Won	
Sydney Film Festival	14 June 2026	Sydney Film Prize	Fatherland	Nominated	
Camerimage	14 November 2026	Golden Frog	Łukasz Żal	Won	
Gotham Independent Film Awards	30 November 2026	Best International Feature	Pawel Pawlikowski, Edward Berger, Lorenzo Gangarossa, Mario Gianani, Lorenzo Mieli, Ewa Puszczyńska, Dimitri Rassam, Jeanne Tremsal	Pending	
Gotham Independent Film Awards	30 November 2026	Outstanding Supporting Performance	Sandra Hüller	Pending	
European Film Awards	16 January 2027	Best European Film	Fatherland	Pending	
European Film Awards	16 January 2027	Best European Director	Paweł Pawlikowski	Pending	
European Film Awards	16 January 2027	Best European Screenwriter	Paweł Pawlikowski, Henk Handloegten	Pending	
European Film Awards	16 January 2027	Best European Actress	Sandra Hüller	Pending	
European Film Awards	16 January 2027	Best European Actor	Hanns Zischler	Pending	
European Film Awards	16 January 2027	Best European Casting Director	Nina Haun, Magdalena Szwarcbar, Karen Lindsay Stewart	Pending	
European Film Awards	16 January 2027	Best European Cinematographer	Łukasz Żal	Pending	
European Film Awards	16 January 2027	Best European Editor	Paweł Pawlikowski, Piotr Wójcik	Pending	
European Film Awards	16 January 2027	Best European Make-Up & Hair Artist	Waldemar Pokromski	Pending	
European Film Awards	16 January 2027	Best European Production Designer	Katarzyna Sobańska, Marcel Sławiński	Pending	
European Film Awards	16 January 2027	Best European Sound	Lars Ginzel, Tarn Willers	Pending	

== See also ==
- List of submissions to the 99th Academy Awards for Best International Feature Film
- List of Polish submissions for the Academy Award for Best International Feature Film
