= American Collegiate Institute =

Coordinates: 38.395834°N 27.089289°E

- İzmir; Turkey

Information
- Type: Private & co-educational
- Motto: Enter to learn, depart to serve
- Established: 1878; 148 years ago
- Principal: Didem Erpulat
- Head of school: Brad Bell
- Grades: Prep, 9, 10, 11, 12
- Campus: Urban
- Colors: Blue, white & red
- Website: aci.k12.tr

Founded in 1878, the American Collegiate Institute (Turkish: Özel İzmir Amerikan Koleji), referred to by the acronym ACI, is a private co-educational high school in Goztepe, İzmir, Turkey. ACI was founded, and is now run, by the charity foundation Sağlık ve Eğitim Vakfı (SEV). The school's motto is "Enter to learn, depart to serve", and the school song is "Hail Alma Mater Fair".

== History ==
The American Collegiate Institute, the oldest private high school in İzmir, was founded in 1878. At that time, İzmir, now a metropolitan city on the western coast of Turkey, was known as Smyrna In its early years, the school was an American Christian missionary school that only accepted girls as students. This all-girl school's first campus was in Basmane, a district of the city İzmir. The land ACI now occupies was bought in 1912 to relieve overcrowding at the school's old site in Basmane. However, due to the tension caused by World War I and the ensuing Turkish War of Independence, the relocation of the school's campus was not possible until 1923. Even after the relocation, Turkish authorities did not officially recognize the school and named the school İzmir Göztepe Amerikan Mektebi (English: İzmir Göztepe American School). In the early 1900s, as tension eased, the school was officially recognized as The American Collegiate Institute.

After its foundation, the school was subject to dramatic changes. In 1986, ACI started accepting male students and became a co-educational school.

== Campus, buildings and facilities ==
The American Collegiate Institute inhabits a verdant 7-acre (28,000 m^{2}) campus.

There are 17 buildings across the campus. The Blake Auditorium, renovated in 2007, holds a total of 600 people with its first floor and balcony. The Hill Science Center is a three-story building with each floor dedicated to one of the core branches of science; chemistry, physics and biology. Each floor has a laboratory and two classrooms, all equipped with Smartboards that were added in 2006. Most 10th, 11th or 12th grade classes are taught in the Beacon Hall. This hall also holds the Turkish Language, English Language, Social Studies and Second Foreign Languages department offices, and also the vice-president's office.

The newest building, Taner Hall, which was constructed in 2009, includes the all-girl dormitory and classes for Preparatory ("prep") grade and 9th grade. Until 2009, Parsons Hall was dedicated to prep and 9th grade classes; however, with the construction of Taner Hall, it now embraces the Second Foreign Language classes. Parsons Hall also includes the Nurse's Office and the Business Office.

The school has an athletic complex named Shepard Sports Center, consisting of a basketball/volleyball court, a weight room, three dance rooms, the Physical Education Department Office, and girls’ and boys’ locker rooms. There are also three table tennis equipments in Shepard. In addition there are three outdoor soccer fields, two outdoor tennis courts, one beach volleyball court and two outdoor basketball courts.

The American Collegiate Institute library includes both Turkish and English material: The Naomi Foster Library. There are approximately 50,000 material; books, journals, gazettes, CDs, VCDs and DVD. The students can access 118 online journals and five databases the library is subscribed to. In addition, there are computer labs in the Taner Hall and the Naomi Foster Library.

Sharing ACI's campus, there is an elementary school sponsored by SEV. At 2006, this elementary school, named SEV Elementary School, moved to a newly built building next-door to ACI's campus

In August 2011, the boys' dormitory opened across from the ACI campus on Inonu Street. It is a seven-story building with a capacity for 81 dormitory students.

== Academics ==
=== Enrollment and preparatory year ===
Entrance to ACI is through a competitive national exam, just like any other high school in Turkey, which students take at the end of their 8th grade year. Enrollment into ACI is solely based on this exam. The school used to test its new students level of English by an English promotion exam. Students with a passing grade would directly start the school from 9th grade while those failing to pass would be required to study an English-intensive preparatory year, which is often called "the prep year". Now, however, the exam's purpose and consequences have changed. Now, the prep year is mandatory. Now, all students study for the extra English-intensive year and the exam's results place students into one of the three levels of English class they take in their prep year. With these changes that were made in 2009 only to affect the new coming students, the core school program is five years

=== International Baccalaureate ===
Starting from the 2006–07 academic year, authorized by the International Baccalaureate Organization ("IBO"), the school began offering the IB Diploma Programme (IBDP). Due to the regulations of the Turkish Ministry of Education, the International Baccalaureate (IB) diploma candidates are also required to take the courses required for the Turkish Ministry of Education High School Diploma. Although some classes are common in the diploma syllabuses, this is a "rigorous curriculum" as defined by the school faculty.

In addition to these, participating in at least one of the social services ACI offers is a requirement for any diploma.

== Extra-curricular activities ==
ACI offers more than 100 clubs and committees to its students. These clubs include Model United Nations ("MUN"), International Schools Theatre Association ("ISTA"), Junior Achievement, etc. The MUN and the ISTA clubs participate in international conferences/festivals.

=== Model United Nations ===
ACI's Model United Nations club, which celebrated its 25th year in 2020, consists of 40–80 students and an executive team, who debate on world issues for 6 hours a week in school's famous B4 classroom. Club annually participates in various conferences including The Hague International Model United Nations (THIMUN) and Turkish International Model United Nations (TIMUN). In 2019, club's executive team and staff teachers decided to organize the club's own conference. Named American Collegiate Institute Model United Nations (ACIMUN), the first session of this conference was planned to be held in April 2020, but was postponed due to COVID-19 pandemic.

=== International Schools Theater Association ===
The ISTA club joined the schools club and committee family in the 2007–08 school year. As of 2010, it had participated in four ISTA conferences abroad; in Norway, in Zurich and in London and in Luxembourg. This club has also hosted an ISTA festival in ACI, with the theme shadows in the ruins, at 26–29 March 2009. To accomplish its goals of "shows commitment to justice, mutual respect, human rights, ethical behavior, tolerance, and self-discipline" and "participates fully in democratic processes and philanthropic organizations as part of lifelong service to humanity" the ACI offers eight different Social Service Programs, and as stated above, every student is required to participate in one for one year

=== Student Council ===
ACI also has a Student Council elected annually by the votes of the students. The Student Council consists of a president, two vice presidents, two secretaries, two treasurers and three auditors. There are also two sponsor teachers to the counsel

== School song ==
ACI's song is "Hail Alma Mater Fair". This song is sung by the graduating class at their Commencement every year. The lyrics of the song are:

Hail Alma Mater fair,
Loved by sons and daughters,
Golden the hours that we
Spent at thy knee entrancing.
Mem'ries precious and tender
Friendship firm and enduring
Strong is the faith that we
Cherish for thee alway
Alma Mater fair.

Shadows are fleeting by
Years speed ever onward.
Time cannot dim the truth
Of thy words eternal,
"Not myself to serve, but
All mankind and my country."
God keep us loyal all
Faithful in heart and home
To the pledge of our youth.

In 2004, in the archives of Pistol Hall, a handwritten document named "Alma Mater" was found. The document is signed by a former teacher at ACI, S. Ralph Harlow. Although it is not dated, the document there could be the first version of today's school song, "Hail Alma Mater Fair".

== Notable alumni ==
- Janet Akyüz Mattei, Turkish-American astronomer, former director of the American Association of Variable Star Observers
- Gül Güner Akdoğan, Turkish biochemist at İzmir University of Economics School of Medicine
- Barış Attila, Turkish Golden Trailer Award-winning motion graphic designer, adjunt instructor of the Pratt Institute
- Efe Cakarel, Turkish entrepreneur, founder and CEO of MUBI
- Sadiye Özülkü, Turkish lawyer, chairman of the International Lawyers Group (ILG) and ACI Alumni Association

== See also ==
- List of high schools in Turkey
- Education in the Ottoman Empire
