= Efe Cakarel =

Turkish entrepreneur

Efe Çakarel
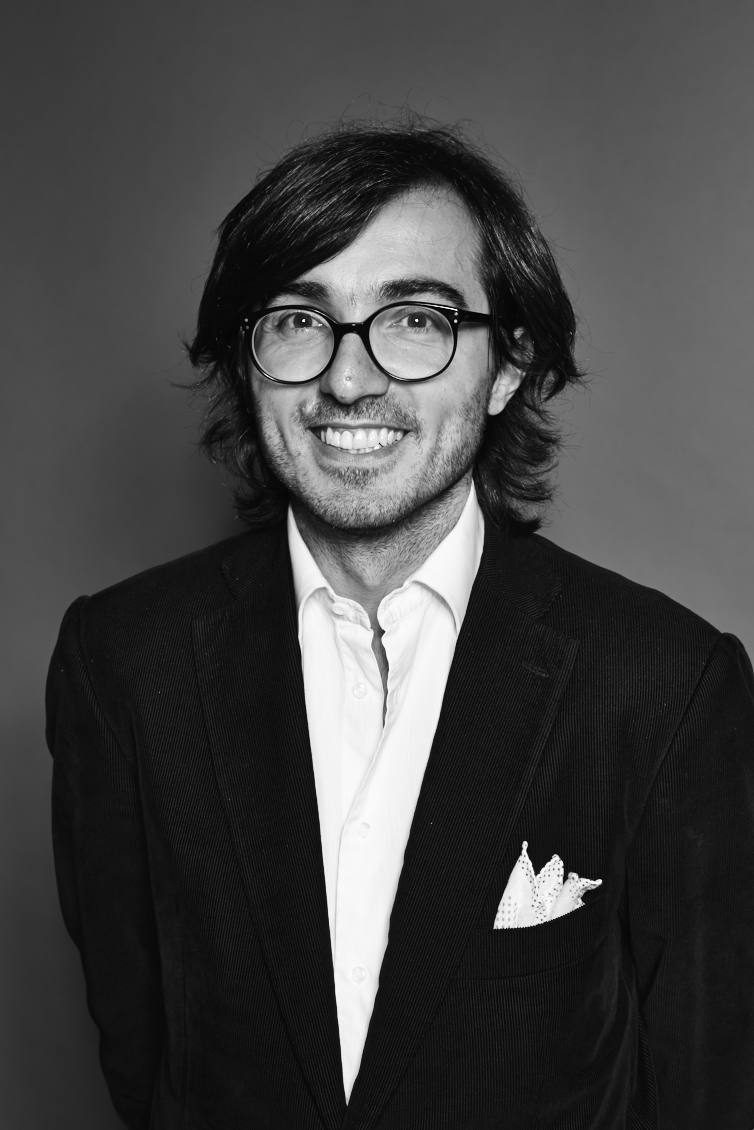
- Education: Massachusetts Institute of Technology (BS); Stanford University (MBA)

Efe Çakarel is a Turkish entrepreneur, most known as the founder and CEO of MUBI.

== Life and career ==
Following his graduation from the American Collegiate Institute in İzmir, Turkey, Cakarel earned his B.S. in Electrical Engineering and Computer Science from Massachusetts Institute of Technology, and an MBA from Stanford Graduate School of Business. Prior to founding MUBI, he spent a number of years at Goldman Sachs in investment banking. He was part of Turkey's national math team and placed third in the European Math Olympiad. He also has two patents related to monetization of web applications.

In February 2025, The New York Times published a major profile piece on MUBI and Efe Cakarel, positioning MUBI as "a real Hollywood player" following the success of The Substance.

At the Cannes Film Festival in May 2025, MUBI paid $24m for Lynne Ramsay’s psychological comedy-drama Die My Love, starring Jennifer Lawrence and Robert Pattinson, across multiple territories - the biggest deal in to come out of Cannes that year.

In May 2025, the venture capital firm Sequoia Capital invested £100m in MUBI, valuing the company at $1bn.

== Criticism and Cakarel's Open Letter ==
In May 2025, MUBI announced that it had secured $100m in funding from Sequoia Capital. The announcement provoked widespread criticism within the international film community. At least 63 signatories signed an open letter condemning the distribution company's move citing Sequoia's investment in Israeli defense-tech startup, Kela.

Efe Cakarel, in response, wrote an open letter highlighting that profits generated by MUBI will not be used by Sequoia to fund other businesses in its portfolio. Cakarel also mentioned that Sequoia partner, Shaun Maguire was not part of the MUBI board. However, the open letter had no mention of Andrew Reed - the Sequoia Partner Andrew Reed who is on the MUBI board.
