= Jeanne Tremsal =

German-French actress and producer (born 1977)

- Born: 1977 (age 48–49)
- Occupations: Actress; producer; restaurateur
- Years active: 1999–present

Jeanne Tremsal (born 1977) is a German-French actress, producer, and restaurateur.

== Biography ==
At the age of two, Tremsal and her sister moved to Friedrichshof Commune, a far-left commune founded by Austrian artist and convicted sex criminal Otto Muehl, where they lived without their parents. After leaving the commune, Tremsal worked as a restaurateur for five years, managing the French restaurant Le Petit Royal in Berlin. She considered publishing a book about her time in Friedrichshof Commune, but later co-wrote the film Servus Papa, See You in Hell with her partner Christopher Roth. In the film, she plays her own mother. In 2023, she co-founded the production company Nine Hours with director Edward Berger and Luke Rivett. As of 2023, she lives in Berlin.

== Filmography ==
=== As actress ===
==== Film ====
Year	Title	Role	Ref.
2000	Doppelpack	Saleswoman	
2022	Servus Papa, See You in Hell	Mathilde	

==== Television ====
Year	Title	Role	Notes	Ref.
2003	Mutter kommt in Fahrt	Anna Jakobson	Television film	
2004	Eine verflixte Begegnung im Mondschein	Gianna Broglia	Television film	
2006	Wer entführt meine Frau?	Inge	Television film	
2006	Und plötzlich war es Liebe	Julia Greenwood	Television film	
2007	Barbara Wood: Sturmjahre	Violet Simmons	Television film	
2008	Inga Lindström: Der Zauber von Sandbergen	Selma Alander	Television film	
2008	Und Jimmy ging zum Regenbogen		Television film	
2009	Schokolade im Sommer	Anna Seidel	Television film	
2010	Inga Lindström: Zwei Ärzte und die Liebe	Catherine	Television film	
2013	Das Traumschiff	Corinna Hartung	Episode: "Puerto Rico"	
2019	Die Diplomatin – Böses Spiel	Margo Beaumont	Television film	
2020	Der Zürich-Krimi: Borchert und der fatale Irrtum	Martina Hundziker	Television film	
2020	Spurlos in Marseille	Katja	Television film	
2020	Falk	Clémentine Dombois	6 episodes	

=== Other credits ===
Year	Title	Writer	Producer	Ref.
2022	Servus Papa, See You in Hell	Yes	No	
2025	Ballad of a Small Player	No	Executive	
2026	Fatherland	No	Yes	
