= Tino Mewes =

German actor (born 1983)

- Born: 5 April 1983 (age 43); Berlin, Germany
- Occupations: Actor, voice actor
- Years active: 2002–present

Tino Mewes (born 5 April 1983) is a German actor and voice actor. He has appeared in more than fifty films since 2002.

== Filmography ==
Year	Title	Role	Notes
2002	Do Fish Do It?	Jan	
2002	Epstein's Night	Adam Rose - 16 Jahre	
2003	Learning to Lie	Long shepherd	
2004	Love in Thoughts	Django	
2004	Kleinruppin forever	René	
2004	Night of the Living Dorks	Philip	
2005	Rose	Klaus Grund	
2008	The Wave	Schädel	
2008	The Red Baron	Oberleutnant Kurt Wolff	
2008	Coxless Pair	Johann	
2010	Three	Junger Zuschauer	
2011	I Phone You	Student	
2011	Pariser Platz - Berlin	Drunks on the Boat 2 / Pothead 2	
2011	205 – Room of Fear	Dirk	
2013	Zur Sache, Macho!	Daniel Spatz	TV movie
2013	When Inge Is Dancing	Fabio	
2014	Not for Cowards	Ulli	TV movie
2014	Playing Doctor		Voice
2014	Die Schlikkerfrauen	Arne	
2017	Königin von Niendorf	Thomas	
2019	Cleo	Arzt	
2022	1899	Sebastian	TV series
