= Love in Thoughts =

- Love in Thoughts DVD cover
- Directed by: Achim von Borries
- Written by: Hendrik Handloegten; Achim von Borries
- Produced by: Stefan Arndt
- Starring: Daniel Brühl; August Diehl; Anna Maria Mühe; Thure Lindhardt; Jana Pallaske
- Cinematography: Jutta Pohlmann
- Edited by: Gergana Voigt
- Music by: Thomas Feiner
- Production companies: X Filme Creative Pool; ZDF; Arte
- Distributed by: X Verleih AG (through Warner Bros.)
- Release date: 12 February 2004
- Running time: 89 minutes
- Country: Germany
- Language: German

Love in Thoughts (German: Was nützt die Liebe in Gedanken) is a 2004 German drama film directed by Achim von Borries and written by von Borries and Hendrik Handloegten. The main characters are played by Daniel Brühl, August Diehl, Anna Maria Mühe, Thure Lindhardt and Jana Pallaske.

== Plot ==
The movie is based on a real event, the "Steglitz school tragedy" (Steglitzer Schülertragödie) that took place in Berlin in 1927. It opens with Paul being questioned by police about a note he had written. The scene then fades out, and the movie shows what happened. Paul, a shy virgin poet who is tired of being alone and heartbroken, is friends with an openly gay aristocrat boy, Günther, who is suffering unrequited love for Hans. Paul is staying at Günther's parents' country home over the weekend. The parents are absent. Günther's sister Hilde, who stole Hans' heart besides, is loved by Paul, for whom Günther has budding feelings, which complicates the brother-sister relationship. Hilde has no interest in committing to a relationship with Paul, however. Günther invites some people over to have an all-night party, filled with alcohol, music, and sex. It is one of their last parties, since Paul and Günther have made a suicide pact. Paul, during this time, also has sex with Elli, a friend of Hilde's who was invited to the party. Günther, Paul, Hans and Hilde go through a series of couplings, conversation and partying before proceeding to Hilde and Günther's parents' apartment in the city. There the drama ends with Günther shooting Hans and then himself. The question is what actually happened.

== Cast ==
- Daniel Brühl as Paul Krantz
- August Diehl as Günther Scheller
- Anna Maria Mühe as Hilde Scheller
- Jana Pallaske as Elli
- Thure Lindhardt as Hans
- Verena Bukal as Rosa
- Julia Dietze as Lotte
- Buddy Elias as Dr. Frey
- Luc Feit as Zipfer
- Marius Frey as Bittner
- Holger Handtke as Wieland
- Jonas Jägermeyr as Pit
- Roman Kaminski as Vorsitzender bei Gericht (Chairman of the Court)
- Christoph Luser as Macke
- Tino Mewes as Django
- Thomas Neumann as Kommissar Peters
- Thomas Schendel as Kommissar Kraus
- Fabian Oscar Wien as Fritz
- Jürgen Wink as Lehrer Krähe
- Melek Diehl as Partyguest
- Clemens Fickweiler as Partyguest
- Daniel Hischer as Partyguest
- Nele Kalau as Partyguest
- Monika Küpker as Partyguest
- Kai Krambeer as Partyguest
- Bodo Maier as Partyguest
- Ivonne Meyer as Partyguest
- Nicolai Paschke as Partyguest
- Helena Pistor as Partyguest
- Olga Regier as Partyguest
- Anna-Zoe Schmidt as Partyguest (as Zoe Schmidt)
- Michael Schreiber as Partyguest
- Undine Spiller as Partyguest
- Ivan Shvedoff (as Iwan Shvedoff) as a guest in the Moka Efti (the high-class restaurant in which Hans works as a chef)

== Awards ==
Won

- 2005: German Film Critics Association Awards - for Best Actor: August Diehl
- 2004: Copenhagen International Film Festival - Golden Swan for Best actress: Anna Maria Mühe
- 2004: European Film Awards - Audience Award for Best Actor: Daniel Brühl
- 2004: New Faces Awards, Germany - for Best Director: Achim von Borries
- 2004: Undine Awards, Austria - for Best Young Actor - Film: August Diehl
- 2004: Verona Love Screens Film Festival - for Best Film: Love in Thoughts

Nominated

- 2005: German Camera Award - for Feature Film: Jutta Pohlmann
- 2004: Brussels European Film Festival - Golden Iris : Love in Thoughts
