= Frank Goosen =

German cabaret artist and author (born 1966)

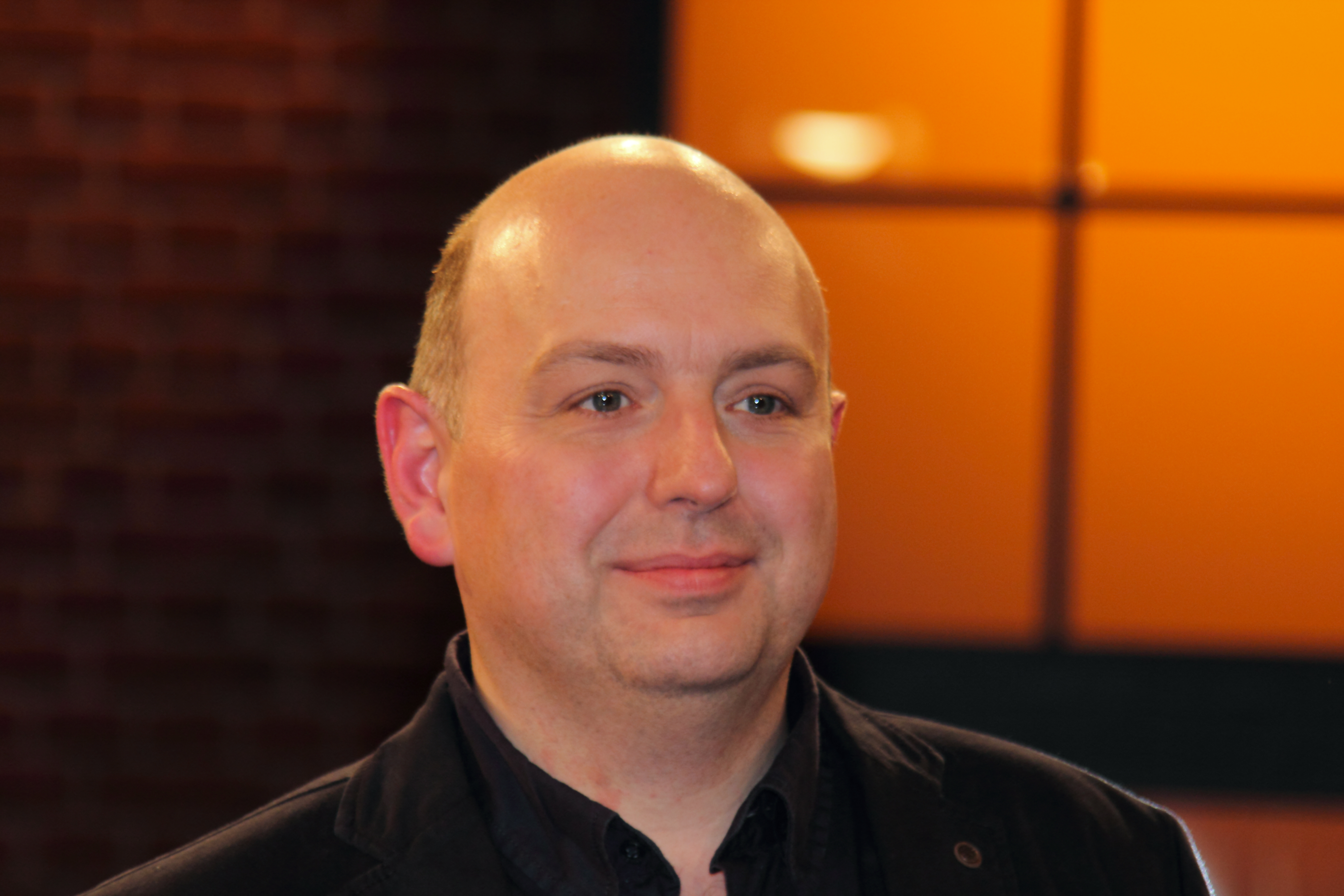
Goosen in 2012

Frank Goosen (born 31 May 1966) is a German cabaret artist and author.

== Biography ==
Goosen was born on 31 May 1966 in Bochum, West Germany. He went the Ruhr University Bochum majoring in history, German studies and political science graduating in 1992 with a Magister degree.

Afterward, he founded the stand up-comedy team Tresenlesen with Jochen Malmsheimer. They won the Prix Pantheon, a German cabaret award, in 1997 but later parted ways.

Since then, Goosen has worked as an author, writing novels that take place in the Ruhr area during the Cold War. His most popular novel, liegen lernen, Learning to Lie, is a story about a young man in the 1980s and 1990s searching for love. It was made into a movie in 2003.

On 4 October 2010 Goosen was voted into the supervisory board of the VfL Bochum. Since 20 December 2010 Goosen serves as vice-chairman of the supervisory board.

== Works ==
- Goosen, Frank (2015). Liegen lernen Roman (in German). Köln: Verlag Kiepenheuer & Witsch. ISBN 978-3-462-04818-6. OCLC 909790046.
