= Night of the Living Dorks =

2004 German horror comedy film

- Directed by: Mathias Dinter
- Written by: Mathias Dinter
- Produced by: Marian Dany; Mischa Hofmann; Philip Voges
- Starring: Tino Mewes; Manuel Cortez; Thomas Schmieder; Collien Fernandes
- Cinematography: Stephan Schuh
- Edited by: Cornelie Strecker
- Music by: Frank Jastfelder, Andreas Grimm
- Production company: Constantin Film
- Distributed by: Highlight Film (Germany); Anchor Bay Entertainment (United States)
- Release dates: November 4, 2004 (Germany); February 20, 2007 (United States)
- Running time: 89 minutes
- Country: Germany
- Language: German

Night of the Living Dorks (German: Die Nacht der lebenden Loser) is a 2004 German horror comedy film starring Tino Mewes, Manuel Cortez, Thomas Schmieder, and Collien Fernandes and written and directed by Mathias Dinter. It was released in the United States in 2007 by Anchor Bay Entertainment under the title "Night of the Living Dorks".

== Plot ==
The film begins in Haiti, where a zombie attacks a small family, only to be quickly killed by being set on fire. The zombie's ashes are gathered in an urn, which is promptly stolen and sold before it can be buried.

Three months later, Philip Fleischhacker (Tino Mewes) is left to watch his parents' house as they go on a trip in their RV, specifically forbidding him to have any parties, drink, or do drugs. He is then picked up by his two friends Wurst (Manuel Cortez), a party-loving stoner and Konrad (Thomas Schmieder), a nerd who is frequently bullied. The three also give a ride to Philip's neighbor Rebecca (Collien Fernandes), a goth girl who has an unrequited crush on Philip. At school, Philip attempts to ask out a popular girl named Uschi (Nadine Garmann), which prompts her jock boyfriend Wolfe (Hendrik Borgmann) to bully and humiliate Philip and his friends.

While in Frau Niedermacher's (Patricia Thielemann) class, Rebecca and her two goth friends Gunther (Oliver Grober) and Frederik (Tom Lass) give a presentation on Voodoo, which is ridiculed by the class, including Wurst and Konrad. When Philip learns that Rebecca knows of a love spell, he asks if she would use it for him so that he could woo Uschi. Though she tells him it will not work, she tells him to meet her and her friends at the cemetery, where she, Gunther, and Frederik planned to perform a ritual. Later that night, Philip, Wurst, and Konrad show up at the cemetery, where they learn that Rebecca and the goths plan to use the ashes of a zombie (specifically the zombie from the beginning of the film), and a chicken from the grocery store, to raise the dead, specifically to raise Kurt Cobain so that he can play music for them. Though the spell is cast, as the urn is being emptied, a gust of wind picks up and covers Philip, Wurst, and Konrad in the zombie's ashes. Disappointed and frustrated, the three leave.

While driving home, Wurst loses control of his van while messing with his bong, causing an accident that kills all three boys. The zombie ashes slowly re-animate them. The three wake up in a mortuary, and discover that they are dead, but are somehow still alive all the same. They escape the morgue, and after returning home realize that they have become zombies as a result of the ritual. The next morning the three eat raw steaks before going to school.

At school, the boys are bullied again by Wolfe, but quickly discover that because they are now zombies, they no longer feel pain and have tremendous strength. Realizing this, Konrad begins to take revenge on those who bullied him (as he has written down every incident since he started school), while Philip seeks out Rebecca. He initially tries to get her help in fixing his zombie condition, but she mistakenly thinks he remembered her birthday, causing him to promise to spend it with her. Throughout the day Konrad begins to crave raw meat and human flesh, causing him to get in trouble after he bites one of his classmates. At gym class, the boys use their newfound strength and immunity to pain in order to trounce Wolfe and the school rugby team, which earns them the admiration of their whole class. To celebrate their victory, Wurst announces a party at Philip's house, and Uschi publicly declares that she will have sex with Philip. When Rebecca sees this, she storms off, angry and hurt.

Konrad sneaks into the office of the gym teacher (Tim Wilde) and takes revenge upon him by eating him. When Philip and Wurst discover this, they scold him and end up ripping of Konrad's ear, which he staples back on. To keep him from eating anyone else, Philip and Wurst chain Konrad to a pipe in the basement. Later on, Uschi and the rest of the school show up at Philip's home and proceed to throw a wild party. Wurst uses his being undead to win numerous bets, particularly drinking competitions, and seduces Frau Niedermacher. Wolfe, eager for revenge for being humiliated by Philip, sneaks in, leaves a stash of drugs in the basement, and calls the police. Konrad consumes all of the drugs and breaks free from his confinement. Philip pleads for Rebecca to come join the party, which she agrees to eventually. She arrives just as Philip and Uschi were about to have sex, causing her to leave, again feeling hurt.

Philip attempts to seduce Uschi, but she accidentally pulls off his penis, causing him to quickly run away. With the help of Wurst, he reattaches his penis with a stapler. Uschi catches the two in the middle of this, and assumes Wurst was giving Philip fellatio. She then ridicules and humiliates him, prompting people to start leaving. The police show up and search the house, but find nothing, much to the dismay of Wolfe (who did not realize the drugs he planted were gone) and Philip (who discovered Konrad had escaped). The police find nothing and break up the party finally. Once alone, Konrad bites and kills Wolfe, prompting them to hide his body in the freezer. Desperate for a cure, Philip goes to Rebecca once again. While alone with her, he loses control, attacks her, accidentally burns her spell book, and then runs away in shame. Rebecca then correctly deduces that the ritual she and the other goths performed turned Philip and his friends in to zombies.

The next morning, Konrad is gone, but Rebecca arrives and agrees to help them find an antidote. She has Philip and Wurst steal another copy of her spell book from a museum, and then sends them off to gather the necessary ingredients, including holy water and the blood of a virgin. Wurst and Philip gather all except the blood, which Rebecca reluctantly offers. As she prepares the potion, Philip and Wurst scramble to clean up the house, as Philip's parents (Henry Grundler and Sissi Perlinger) call to inform him they're on their way home. En route, they accidentally run over Konrad and take him to the hospital. When Philip's parents arrive at home, Philip and Wurst fail in convincing them that there was no party held there the previous night, but manage to escape and consume the potion, making them human again. Philip, Rebecca, and Wurst rush for the hospital, using Frau Niedermacher's car.

At the hospital, the group confront Konrad (who had gone through a large portion of the hospital's blood bank), and give chase in an attempt to get him to drink the potion. While cornering him in an autopsy room, Philip ends up impaled on a knife which Konrad threw at Rebecca, and starts dying for a second time. Overcome with remorse, Konrad saves Philip by turning him into a zombie again using his own blood, and agrees to drink the potion. Wurst accidentally drops the bottle containing it, causing it to break. After tasting the contents of the bottle, however, Wurst realizes it was Frau Niedermacher's special cocktail of "moonshine, vodka, and orange juice," and that she in fact had the real potion. Frau Niedermacher then appears with the bottle, and Philip and Konrad become human again.

In the final scene, Philip and Rebecca acknowledge their feelings for one another and have sex in Philip's bed after sneaking her into his room.

== Reception ==
The film received negative reviews. Rotten Tomatoes gave at the film 20% positives reviews and a note of 4.5/10, based on 5 reviews.

== Remake ==
In 2007, a remake was announced. Michael Showalter was selected by Warner Independent to direct the film, which was described as Revenge of the Nerds meets Shaun of the Dead. Roy Lee, Doug Davison and Adam F. Goldberg would produce the film and Chris Bishop would write the screenplay.
