= Hendrik Handloegten =

German filmmaker (born 1968)

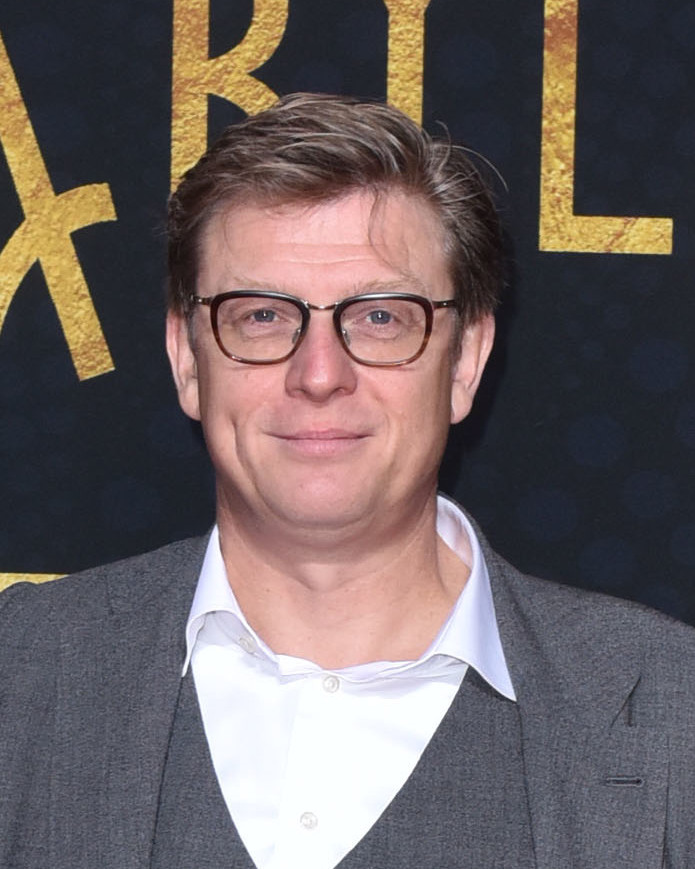
- Handloegten at the premiere of Babylon Berlin in 2017
- Born: 1968 (age 57–58); Celle, West Germany
- Education: Deutsche Film- und Fernsehakademie Berlin
- Occupations: Director; screenwriter
- Years active: 2000–present
- Spouse: Fritzi Haberlandt

Hendrik "Henk" Handloegten (born 1968) is a German film director and screenwriter. He is best known for co-creating, writing, and directing the German neo-noir television series Babylon Berlin (2017–2026).

== Early life ==
Handloegten was born in Celle, West Germany. Due to his father's job with the Federal Foreign Office, he and his family moved between Helsinki, São Paulo, Zurich, and Paris in his youth. At the age of 16, his family permanently relocated to East Berlin, where his father worked in the permanent mission. Although the family lived in East Berlin, Handloegten attended school in West Berlin, crossing Checkpoint Charlie daily. He was co-managing Eiszeit Cinema in Kreuzberg when the Berlin Wall fell in November 1989. He later studied film at the Deutsche Film- und Fernsehakademie Berlin (DFFB).

== Career ==
Handloegten's DFFB graduation film, Paul Is Dead (2000), won the Studio Hamburg Newcomer Prize and a Grimme-Preis. He then wrote and directed the film Learning to Lie (2003), which received funding from the German Federal Film Board, and co-wrote the film Love in Thoughts (2004), directed by Achim von Borries. He also directed Summer Window (2011), based on the novel of the same name by Hannelore Valencak.

He co-created, wrote, and directed the neo-noir television series Babylon Berlin (2017–2026) with Achim von Borries and Tom Tykwer. He also co-wrote the screenplay of Paweł Pawlikowski's Fatherland (2026), which premiered at the 2026 Cannes Film Festival.

== Personal life ==
Handloegten is married to actress Fritzi Haberlandt. They live in Berlin.

== Filmography ==
=== Film ===
| Year | Title | Director | Writer | Notes | Ref. |
|---|---|---|---|---|---|
| 2000 | Paul Is Dead | Yes | Yes | Co-directed with Wolfgang Becker | |
| 2003 | Learning to Lie | Yes | Yes | | |
| 2004 | Love in Thoughts | No | Yes | | |
| 2011 | Summer Window | Yes | Yes | | |
| 2026 | Fatherland | No | Yes | Co-written with Paweł Pawlikowski | |

=== Television ===
| Year | Title | Director | Writer | Notes | Ref. |
|---|---|---|---|---|---|
| 2006 | Tatort: Pechmarie | Yes | No | Television film | |
| 2007 | An Old Maid | Yes | Yes | Television film | |
| 2007 | Polizeiruf 110: Dunkler Sommer | Yes | No | Television film | |
| 2008 | Tatort: Der tote Chinese | Yes | Yes | Television film; co-written with David Keller | |
| 2012 | Sechzehneichen | Yes | Yes | Television film | |
| 2012 | Polizeiruf 110: Fieber | Yes | No | Television film | |
| 2014 | Tatort: Der Eskimo | No | Yes | Television film; co-written with Achim von Borries | |
| 2017–2026 | Babylon Berlin | Yes | Yes | Also co-creator | |
