= Dr. Molly & Karl =

- Country of origin: Germany

Dr. Molly & Karl is a German television series.

== See also ==
- List of German television series
