= Mubi Fest =

Annual international film festival

- Location: Several locations
- Founded: 8 June 2023; 3 years ago
- Language: Spanish, English
- Website: www.mubifest.com

The Mubi Fest (stylized as MUBI FEST) is an annual film festival organized by MUBI and held in several countries worldwide, showcasing new films across all genres. Founded in 2023, the festival held its first edition at the Cineteca Nacional in Santiago, Chile, before launching local editions in Colombia, Argentina, Mexico and Brazil later that year.

== History ==
The Mubi Fest originated in 2023 when the streaming service tested a film festival in Latin America markets, featuring films that had won Academy Awards, BAFTA, or accolades at Cannes. The festival screens a selection of feature films and shorts, alongside talks, Q&As, workshops, installations and DJ sets. Its first-ever global edition was held at the Cineteca Nacional in Santiago, Chile, from June 8 to 11, 2023.

Following the success of the event, local editions were confirmed for Bogotá, Buenos Aires, Mexico City, and São Paulo.

In June 2024, Mubi Fest announced local editions in nine cities across Europe, North America, and Latin America, to be held from July to December of that year. The cycle began in Manchester, marking its first-ever edition in the United Kingdom, followed by Mexico City, São Paulo, Chicago (the inaugural edition in the United States), Bogotá, Buenos Aires, Santiago, and Milan. An edition of the fest was to be held in Istanbul between November 7-10, 2024, but was announced to have been scrapped at the last minute when Mubi learned that local authorities had asked them to pull the opening film Queer from screening on grounds of it containing "provocative content".

The event has been described by the streaming service as "a curated experience of contemporary culture."

Following the cancellation of the Mubi Fest event, which had been scheduled to take place in Istanbul in 2024, the event returned to Istanbul two years later and was held in Kadıköy from September 4–6, 2026
