= Mubi (streaming service) =

British video streaming service

Mubi UK Limited
- Website type: OTT platform; Film production; Film distributor; Film criticism; Publishing
- Headquarters: London, England
- Founder: Efe Cakarel (CEO)
- Website: mubi.com
- Users: 1.7 million subscribers (April 2026)
- Launched: 14 February 2007; 19 years ago
- Current status: Active

Mubi (/ˈmuːbi/ MOO-bee; stylised in all caps) is a British over-the-top subscription video on-demand streaming platform, production company and film distributor. Mubi produces and theatrically distributes films by emerging and established filmmakers, which are exclusively available on its platform. The catalogue consists of world cinema films, such as arthouse, documentary and independent films. Additionally, it publishes Notebook, a film criticism and news publication, and provides weekly cinema tickets to selected new-release films through Mubi Go.

Founded as The Auteurs in 2007 and known by that brand until 2010, Mubi's streaming platform is available in over 190 countries through its website, or using Android TV, Chromecast, Roku devices, Apple Vision Pro, PlayStation consoles, Amazon Fire TV, Apple TV, LG or Samsung Smart TVs, or mobile devices including iPhone, iPad and Android.

== History ==
The Auteurs was founded in 2007 by Turkish entrepreneur Efe Çakarel. The next year, in 2008, the American home-video distribution company Criterion Collection partnered with The Auteurs to begin a video-on-demand service.

In 2010, The Auteurs changed its name to "Mubi" or "MUBI", a two-syllable word with no specific meaning that near-rhymes with "movie", its creators stating that they wanted "a name all audiences can say and spell, without the burden of exclusionary meaning."

In January 2022, Mubi announced the acquisition of arthouse cinema production and sales company The Match Factory.

Prior to the 79th Venice International Film Festival world premiere, Mubi entered the TV industry by acquiring The Kingdom Exodus miniseries and bringing out the first two seasons of the original series in director's cuts.

In 2023, the company announced Mubi Fest, its annual film festival, to be held in Chile, Colombia, Argentina, Mexico and Brazil. The event was expanded to cities in Europe, the United States and Canada a year later.

In February 2024, Mubi acquired a majority stake in Benelux distributor Cinéart.

On September 20, 2024, Mubi released The Substance in theaters worldwide and received critical and commercial success, grossed $77 million as their highest-grossing film ever, which received a Cannes Film Festival Award for Best Screenplay, Golden Globe Award for Best Actress in a Motion Picture – Musical or Comedy out of the 5 nominations at 82nd Golden Globe Awards, 5 Academy Award nominations for Best Picture, Best Director, Best Original Screenplay, Best Actress, and Best Makeup and Hairstyling at the 97th Academy Awards (eventually winning in the Makeup and Hairstyling category), and 5 nominations at the 78th British Academy Film Awards.

In February 2025, The New York Times published a major profile piece on Mubi and Efe Çakarel, positioning Mubi as "a real Hollywood player" following the success of The Substance.

At the Cannes Film Festival in May 2025, Mubi made their largest acquisition to date, as well as the largest deal closed at the festival that year, by paying $24m for distribution rights across multiple territories to Lynne Ramsay's film Die My Love, starring Jennifer Lawrence and Robert Pattinson.

Mubi set a 31 October 2025 date for the company's debut as a direct distributor in the Spanish market with the release of The Mastermind. The company had previously relied on third parties such as Elastica Films, Avalon, A Contracorriente Films, or Filmin for the distribution of its portfolio in Spain.

In 2026, the limited series, Mussolini: Son of the Century (also distributed by Mubi), won the prestigious Peabody Award.

== Publication ==
=== Mubi Notebook (online) ===
Mubi's International film publication named Notebook, is composed of daily online publications freely accessible via the website (same as streaming), which has been an essential part of the website's relevance as a curated cinema streaming service.

The online publication includes a wide variety of coverage of cinema from interviews, features, columns, news, as well as coverage of selected major film festival such as Cannes, Berlinale, Toronto, Sundance and Rotterdam.

Since 2009, the publication has featured an ongoing column named "Movie Poster of the Week" by writer Adrian Curry, which curates and discusses mostly contemporary movie posters. The column's focus allows space to discuss and highlight many territory-specific posters of well-known films around the globe.

The publication is also known for its focus on a wider range of world cinema and highlight of independent, artist-driven, and experimental cinema. Since its beginning in 2009 its contributors have often published writings on sections from major film festivals that are often ignored by other publications such as Toronto International Film Festival's Wavelengths, the Berlinale Forum Expanded, and the New York Film Festival sections Views from the Avant-Garde (until 2013), Projections (2014–2018), and more Currents (2019–). Throughout the years, the most consistent coverages of these sections in MUBI Notebook has been made by writers Michael Sicinski and David Hudson.

In the same form as other online publications of cinema and art at large, MUBI Notebook, is open to the public for pitching and it states its pitching guidelines very clearly on its website.

=== Notebook Magazine (print) ===
In 2021 Mubi launched the Notebook Magazine (ISSN 2769-7681), an editorially independent semiannual print magazine with limited sale. The magazines are sold globally via both a subscription service (purchased separately from the streaming service) and in selected bookstores around the world. The magazine is only available in English language and has no digital archive or version available.

== Podcasts ==
In 2021, Mubi launched two original podcasts. An English language podcast called Mubi Podcast produced and hosted by Rico Gagliano, and a Spanish language podcast titled Mubi Podcast: Encuentros, produced in collaboration with La Corriente del Golfo, the production house founded by Gael García Bernal and Diego Luna. In 2023, Mubi launched an Italian-language podcast, Mubi Podcast: Voci Italiane Contemporanee, in collaboration with Chora Media, hosted by critic Gianmaria Tammaro.

== Mubi productions ==
Mubi productions and co-productions include:

=== Released ===
- Port Authority (Danielle Lessovitz)
- Farewell Amor (Ewka Msangi)
- Our Men (Rachel Lang)
- Memory (Michel Franco)
- My First Film (Zia Anger)
- Bring Them Down (Christopher Andrews)
- One Fine Morning (Mia Hansen-Løve)
- Gasoline Rainbow (Bill Ross IV and Turner Ross)
- Father, Mother, Sister, Brother (Jim Jarmusch)
- Witches (Elizabeth Sankey)
- Magic Farm (Amalia Ulman)
- The Mastermind (Kelly Reichardt)
- Teenage Sex and Death at Camp Miasma (Jane Schoenbrun)
- Rosebush Pruning (Karim Aïnouz)

=== Upcoming releases ===
==== 2026 ====
- A Long Winter (Andrew Haigh)
- Fatherland (Paweł Pawlikowski)

==== To be announced ====
- Let Love In (Felix van Groeningen)
- If Love Should Die (Mia Hansen-Løve)

== Mubi releases ==
Mubi is also a film distributor. In addition to releasing films on the platform, it started distributing theatrically in the United States and United Kingdom in 2016, in Latin America and Germany in 2021, and in Italy and Spain in 2025.

== Controversy ==
In May 2025, the venture capital firm Sequoia Capital invested $100 million in Mubi, valuing the company at $1 billion. However, the investment has sparked significant backlash due to Sequoia's ties to Kela, an Israeli defence-tech startup founded by former intelligence officers during the Gaza invasion. Critics, including Film Workers for Palestine and supporters of the BDS movement, have condemned Mubi's decision, calling for boycotts and demanding the company return the funds. Mubi has responded by distancing itself from the views of its investors, stating that the partnership aimed to support its global mission in independent cinema. The demands for Mubi to nix the Sequoia investment were not implemented.

In an open letter written for the press on August 14, 2025, Efe Çakarel addressed the issue by stating that Mubi is not directly tied with the firm while condemning the humanitarian crisis in Gaza and reaffirmed support for peace, dignity, and freedom for all people. To avoid confusion and anger, Mubi launched an Ethical Funding and Investment Policy along with the Artists Advisory Council; while expanding their Artists At Risk Fund "to support filmmakers under conflict, displacement, or censorship through commissions, residencies, and restoration projects".

== See also ==
- List of streaming media services
- Vulgar auteurism
- Cinephilia
- Curzon Home Cinema
- Fandor
- The Film Detective
- FilmStruck
- Indieflix
- Kanopy
- Netflix
- Shudder
- Tubi
