= Do Fish Do It? =

2002 German film by Almut Getto

- Directed by: Almut Getto
- Starring: Tino Mewes; Sophie Rogall
- Release date: 25 January 2002
- Running time: 1h 44min
- Country: Germany
- Language: German

Do Fish Do It? (German: Fickende Fische) is a 2002 German drama film directed by Almut Getto.

== Cast ==
- Tino Mewes – Jan
- Sophie Rogall – Nina
- Hans Martin Stier – Hanno
- Annette Uhlen – Lena
- Ferdinand Dux – Opa
- Ellen ten Damme – Caro
- Jürgen Tonkel – Wolf
- Angelika Milster – Angel
