= Achim von Borries =

German film director and screenwriter

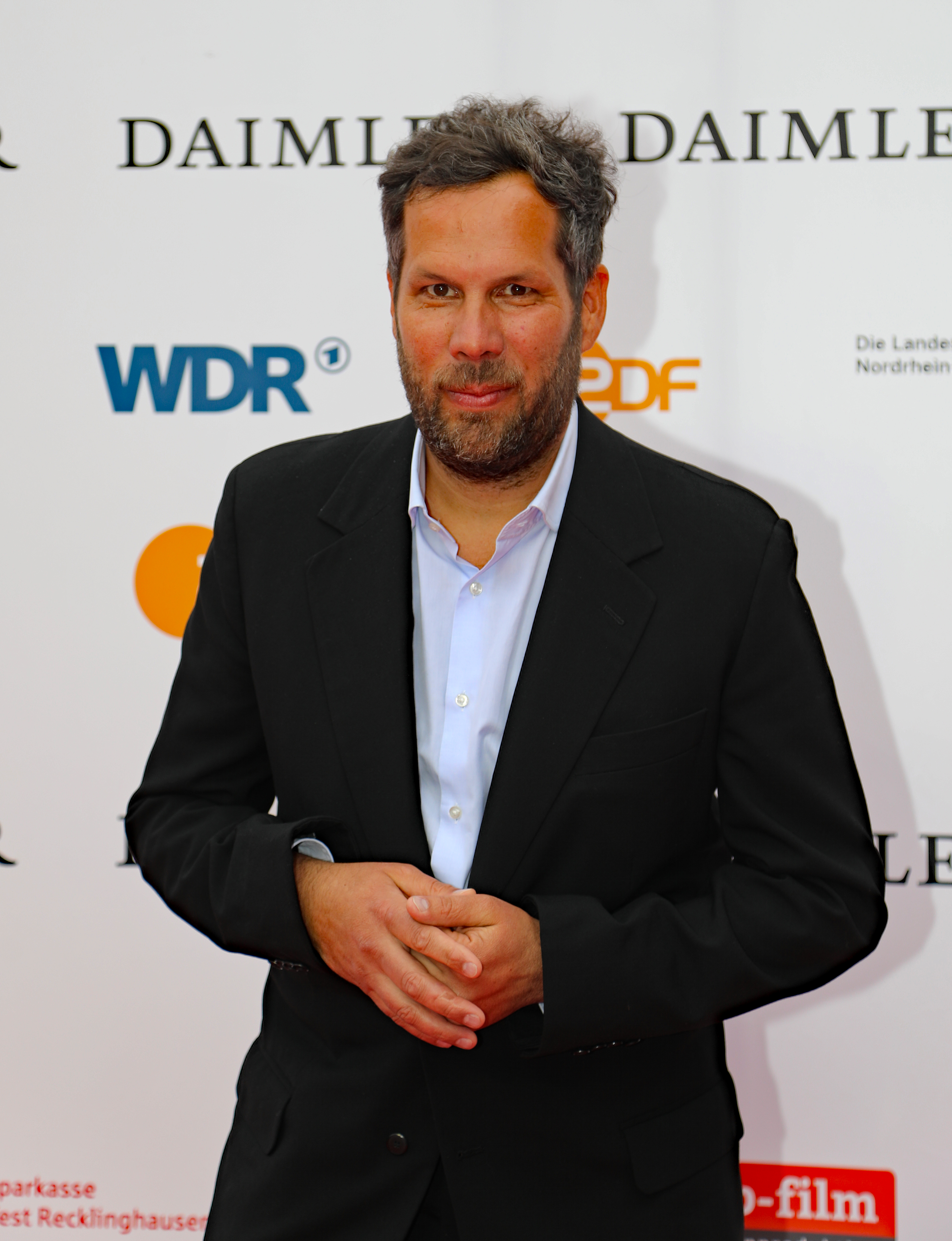
- Achim von Borries (2018)
- Born: 13 November 1968 (age 57); Munich, West Germany
- Occupation: Screenwriter

Achim von Borries (born 13 November 1968) is a German screenwriter and film director.

== Selected filmography ==
Year	Title	Credited as		Notes
Year	Title	Director	Writer	Notes
2017–26	Babylon Berlin	✓	✓	TV series; also co-creator
2016	Alone in Berlin		✓	
2013	Alaska Johansson	✓		TV film
2011	4 Days in May	✓	✓	Also co-producer
2004	Love in Thoughts	✓		
2003	Good Bye Lenin!		✓	
