= Werner Pinzner =

German hired killer (1947–1986)

- Werner Pinzner's passport photo
- Born: 27 April 1947; Bramfeld, Allied-occupied Germany
- Died: 29 July 1986 (aged 39); Hamburg, West Germany
- Cause of death: Suicide by gun
- Resting place: Burgtor Cemetery, Lübeck
- Other names: Mucki; St. Pauli Killer
- Years active: 1984–1986 (14 months)
- Employer: Wiener Peter
- Style: Shooting
- Spouse: Jutta

Details
- Victims: Approx. 13

Werner Pinzner (27 April 1947, Bramfeld – 29 July 1986, Hamburg), also called "Mucki", was a German contract killer who became known as the "St. Pauli Killer". In 1986, he was responsible for a series of contract killings and gained nationwide attention when, during interrogation at the Hamburg police headquarters, he fatally shot the investigating public prosecutor, his own wife, and himself. The case had political consequences in the city of Hamburg and is considered one of the most "spectacular" cases in the criminal history of the Federal Republic of Germany. Pinzner is also believed to have killed between seven and ten people before the Hamburg police headquarters incident.

== Early life ==
Werner Pinzner was born on 27 April 1947 in Bramfeld, the son of a radio mechanic and a grocery chain store manager. In 1964, after dropping out of school without a degree, he went to sea with the International Christian Maritime Association for two years. In 1966 he worked as a driver for a few weeks and then briefly went to sea again. He attempted to become a regular soldier in the German Armed Forces but failed due to prior convictions. He met his first wife shortly afterwards. In 1970, he was sentenced to imprisonment for the first time, and his daughter was born the following year. After her birth, Pinzner worked as a scaffolder, tiler, and butcher. In August 1975, he took part in an armed robbery at a supermarket, where one of the perpetrators shot the store manager.

Pinzner was arrested in September 1975 and sentenced to ten years in prison. Before he was sentenced, he met his second wife, Jutta. He served nine years of sentence in Fuhlsbüttel prison; then moved to the Vierlande Correctional Facility. During his stay in prison, he made contacts in the red-light district of Hamburg and came into contact with drugs. While in prison, Pinzner was able to buy a .38 Special calibre Arminius revolver and store it in his locker, which, due to the open prison concept of the facility, was offered to every inmate and was never searched.

In June 1984, while he was on day release, he took part in a robbery with two accomplices from the red-light district and committed his first contract killing the following month, just before his release in July 1984.

== Assassinations ==
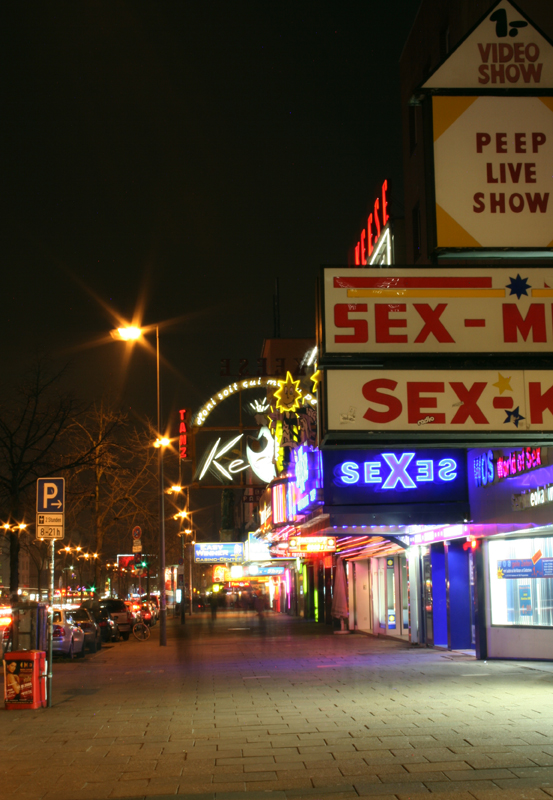
Red-light district in Hamburg

Pinzner worked as a contract killer in the red-light district of St. Pauli, Hamburg. He also committed crimes nationwide, but these crimes were essentially related to conflicts in St. Pauli. Pinzner's primary client was a pimp nicknamed "Wiener Peter".

=== St. Pauli at the time of Pinzner's murders ===
The pimps of Hamburg's red-light district operated brothels in Hamburg and nationwide. However, prostitution experienced a significant decline in the 1980s as fears of HIV infection increased. The pimps initially reacted by brutally intensifying the exploitation of the prostitutes. Drug trafficking also increased, as did other illegal activities such as arms dealing or fencing. Disputes related to the criminal activity increased as a consequence, leading as well to the contract killings committed by Pinzner.

In St. Pauli, particularly along Herbertstraße and at the Reeperbahn, two groups of pimps formed, vying for influence: the more established so-called GMBH and the emerging Nutella gang. The Hells Angels, used by both groups, also played a certain role as debt collectors. The GMBH was gradually pushed out by a group centered around "Wiener Peter", who later became Pinzner's main client.

=== The individual assassinations ===
==== Jehuda Arzi ====
Jehuda Arzi, also known as Hans Jenö Müller, was a former brothel owner who used his mother's past as a brothel owner to blackmail his former wife and daughter. He was also involved in an unpaid cocaine deal which forced him to run away from his wife and business partners in an apartment in Kiel.

Mediated by "Wiener Peter", Arzi's ex-wife and daughter first asked Pinzner - still serving his sentence at the Vierlande Correctional Facility - to cut off one of Arzi's fingers to intimidate him; however, later, they asked Pinzner to kill Arzi. For a fee of 40,000 DM (equivalent to approximately €125,430 in 2025 or roughly 245,000 Deutsche Mark if accounted for inflation), Pinzner traveled to Kiel with an accomplice, Hockauf, and shot Arzi in his apartment on 7 July 1984. Although Arzi's former wife and daughter were identified relatively quickly as suspects, the proceedings against the two were discontinued due to a lack of evidence. After the crime, Pinzner returned to Vierlande prison and deposited his weapon back in his locker.

==== Peter Pfeilmaier ====
Peter Pfeilmaier, called "Bayern Peter", was a partner in the brothel of "Hammer Deich" and the "MB Club". The club organized illegal gambling, the use of cocaine by members, as well as drug trafficking. Pfeilmaier became an economic risk for his partner due to his increasing cocaine consumption and business-damaging behavior in the brothel. The partner offered "Wiener Peter" a stake in Pfeilmaier's place.

Pinzner was commissioned to assassinate Pfeilmaier. He was to receive DM 15,000 from each of the two new partners and a share in a brothel. On 12 September 1984, with the help of an accomplice, and under the pretense of a large, secluded drug deal, Pinzner lured Pfeilmaier to a garage complex at Hirsekamp in Hamburg's Bramfeld quarter, where Pfeilmaier was shot in the head.

However, Pinzner did not receive the promised share in the brothel; rather, he was to work as a collector at the "Hammer Deich". His accomplice kept part of the promised money.

==== Dietmar Traub ====
Dietmar "Lackschuh" Traub ran the Palais d'Amour (lit. 'Palace of Love') brothel together with "Wiener Peter". Due to his high cocaine consumption, Traub also became a burden for his partner. He also wanted to withdraw from his involvement in the brothel in exchange for a compensation payment of DM 100,000 and to run drug deals independently of his partner.

In November 1984, Traub went to Munich to check on a prostitute. Pinzner followed him with an accomplice who had just been released from prison. The two stopped in Heilbronn, where they obtained an alibi from a brothel known as the "Chief of Heilbronn". They proceeded to Munich and, as with Pfeilmaier, offered the later victim a fictitious drug deal. With Traub, they went to the Hohenbrunn forest in a rental car, faked a car breakdown, and shot Traub after he exited the vehicle.

==== Waldemar Dammer and Ralf Kühne ====
Waldemar Dammer, known as "Neger [German for Negro] Waldi", ran two brothels that were in competition with "Wiener Peter". Shortly before Easter 1985, Dammer had "Wiener Peter" beaten by two of his thugs in his "Palais d'Amour" brothel, publicly humiliating him. Pinzner and an accomplice were commissioned to kill Dammer and the two thugs for a fee of DM 60,000. Pinzner assumed Dammer would meet with the thugs at his home in Schnelsen, so he and his accomplice went to Dammer's house on Easter Monday and were allowed inside. Dammer and his manager Ralf Kühne were shot there, but not the thugs.

Although Pinzner later confessed to these murders, it was proven that his accomplice, rather than Pinzner, had shot the two men.

== Investigations, arrest and suicide ==
In connection with allegations that high-ranking police officers were working with pimps, an investigation group against organised crime, Fachdirektion 65 (or Department 65), was established under Interior Senator Alfons Pawelczyk at the end of the 1970s. It was the first such agency to combat organised crime in Germany. This police unit worked with informants and wiretapping methods and were also shielded internally by the police. Fachdirektion 65 achieved some success against the GMBH, the Nutella gang, and the Hells Angels, among others.

The ballistic evidence found at the crime scenes indicated that the .38 calibre projecticles, although a common calibre, were shot from a gun with a distinctive feature - namely right-handed ten rifling (one twist every ten inches). Owing to this peculiarity and the similar background of the victims (all connected to St. Pauli pimps), the murders were quickly identified as a series with a common perpetrator.

=== Arrest ===
Due to the identification of a series of murders, a special commission was formed under the leadership of Fachdirektion 65, using undercover investigations and the questioning of potential witnesses. After two prostitutes made official statements, a police tactical unit arrested Pinzner, "Wiener Peter", and an accomplice on 15 April 1986, and found the murder weapon during the arrest.

After the arrest, during which the suspects were accused only of murdering "Bayern Peter" Pfeilmaier, Pinzner immediately demanded to speak to the investigating public prosecutor, Wolfgang Bistry. During the first interrogation, Pinzner testified that he had committed eight murders. He later told the prosecutor that he had killed eleven people and was ready to testify under the condition that he could spend another two days undisturbed with his wife, Jutta. The prosecutor's response was vague, however, according to entries in his diary, Pinzner seems to have understood this as a promise. Through his testimony, Pinzner was to provide specific information on five murders in several interrogations and testify on the criminal structures in the red-light district.

Pinzner's motive for his crimes was a desire to participate in the prostitution business. He was obstructed in his goal because he was feared as a contract killer and consequently was not accepted as part of the red-light milieu. After Pinzner spoke to the public prosecutor, a bounty of DM 300,000 is said to have been placed on his head.

=== Press ===
Rolf Lange (Social Democratic Party of Germany), Hamburg Senator for the Interior, described the arrest of Pinzner and the other participants as a great success for Fachdirektion 65 in the fight against organised crime. A media frenzy followed. On the day of Pinzner's arrest, reporter Thomas Reinecke negotiated exclusive access rights to Pinzer, his wife, and his lawyer for a payment of DM 35,000 which Reinecke sold in turn to Stern magazine for DM 50,000. The journalist Thomas Osterkorn obtained private pictures and notes of Pinzner, found by his neighbors in his attic, which had not been searched by police. Bunte printed letters from Pinzner to his wife. The Bild newspaper, unable to match their competition with any exclusive information, instead posted a headline defaming Pinzner's lawyer.

=== Murder-suicide on 29 July 1986 ===
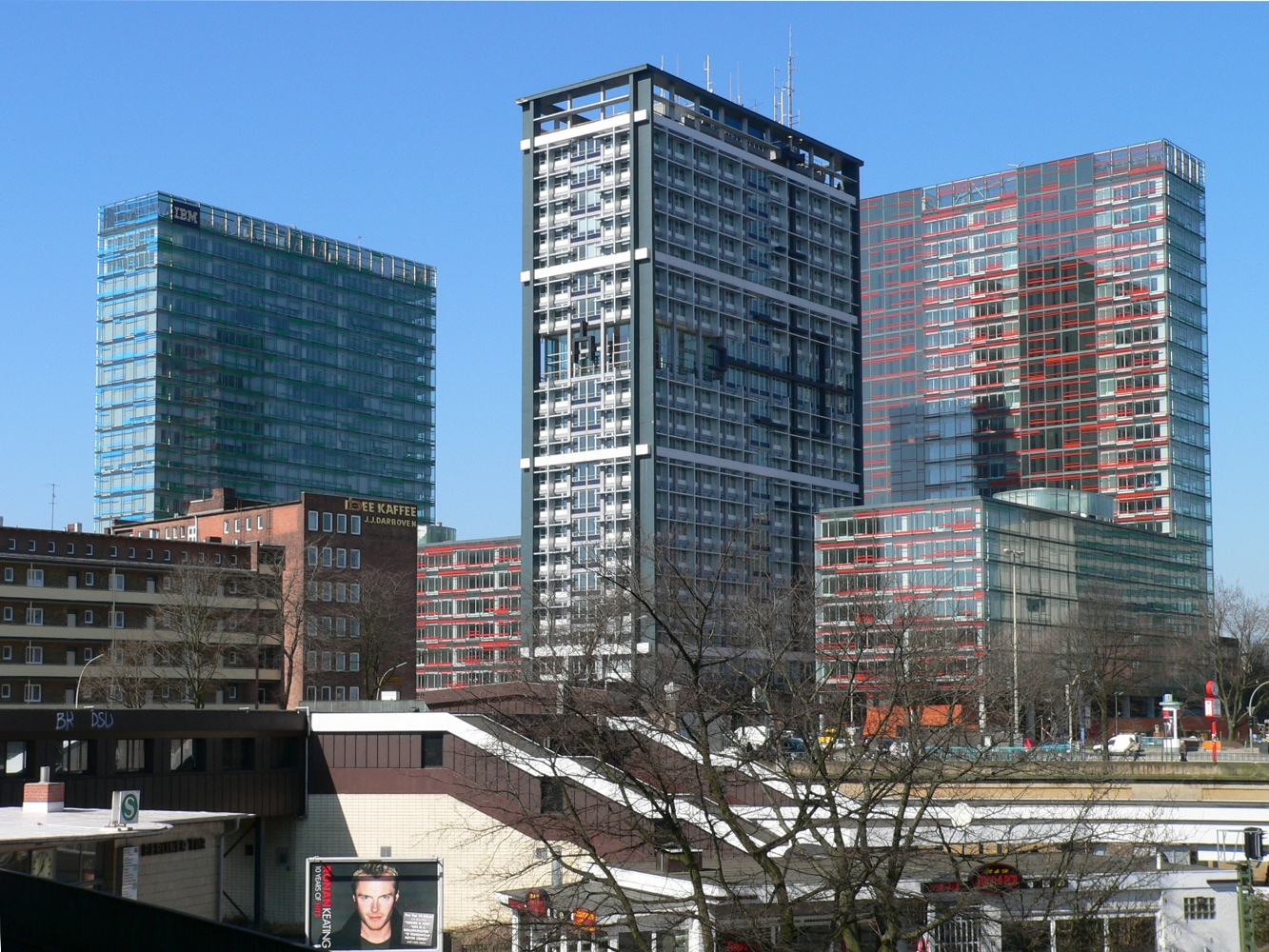
Ensemble of buildings at the Berliner Tor. In the middle is the then police headquarters.

On 29 July 1986, Pinzner was taken for questioning to the Hamburg police headquarters, located in a high-rise building at the Berliner Tor. Present at the questioning were Pinzner, his wife, his lawyer - Isolde Oechsle-Misfeld - two police officers, a typist, and the public prosecutor, Wolfgang Bistry. With the help of Pinzner's lawyer, Pinzner's wife had smuggled a revolver into the headquarters.

When the interrogation was about to begin, Pinzner surprised the prosecutor with the words, "Gentlemen, this is a hostage situation!" and suddenly pulled out the revolver, and shot the prosecutor. The police officers escaped the room to sound the alarm while the typist was unable to escape. Ambulances raced to the headquarters and a helicopter was requested. The rescue workers rushed to the front of the building while Pinzner barricaded the door and phoned his daughter. He told her goodbye, saying, "Birgit, I love you." After he hung up, Pinzner gave his watch to his lawyer, as an heirloom for his daughter. According to Gitta Berger (the typist), Jutta (Pinzner's wife) knelt down in front of him and opened her mouth, at which point Pinzner fatally shot his wife and then himself.

Prosecutor Wolfgang Bistry, with a critical wound to the head, was flown to Eppendorf University Hospital, but died of his injury the next day.

== Aftermath ==
Pinzner was responsible for the killing of 13 people, including his wife Jutta and Wolfgang Bistry. He was buried at the Burgtor Cemetery in Lübeck. The murder weapon is exhibited at Hamburg Police Museum.

=== Police ===
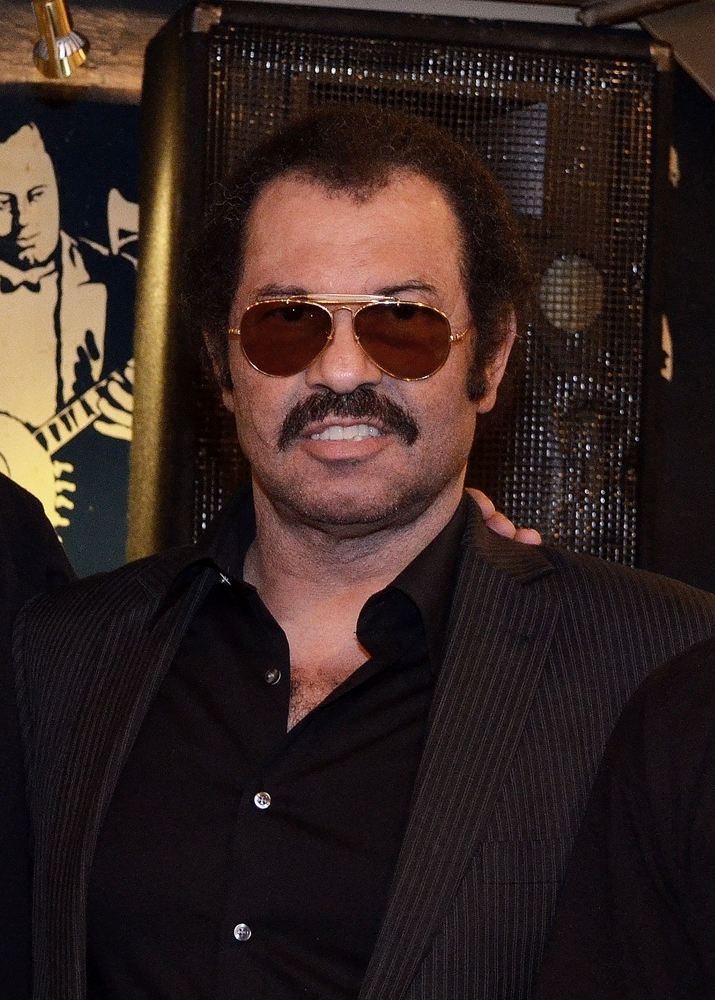
Kalle Schwensen (2012) who was sentenced to three years and three months in prison for procuring the gun for Pinzner

Extensive investigations followed to catch the suspected accomplices of the crime, including a search of Pinzner's attorney's office. In December 1986, around 350 police officers and several public prosecutors simultaneously carried out a major raid in Hamburg, Ahrensburg, Braunschweig, and Mallorca, leading to multiple arrests. Brothel owner Reinhard Klemm, a suspect in the case, escaped and left Germany for Costa Rica, but was extradited after considerable diplomatic efforts.

=== Press ===
After Pinzner's death, a censor was imposed on the press for the first time since the kidnapping and murder of Hanns Martin Schleyer, but this only fueled media speculation. The judicial scandal intensified when it became known that cocaine and puncture marks were found on Pinzner's body, and that paraphernalia for heroin consumption had been found in his cell.

The contract killings and the double murder-suicide attracted considerable public attention. Documentation of the case was exhibited as one of the best-known criminal cases in Hamburg's criminal history. The case was included in series on major criminal cases by both NDR and ARD. ZDF also addressed the series of murders in 2016 in the documentary Murder without Conscience: The St. Pauli Killer in the series Enlightened – Spectacular Criminal Cases. The Pinzner case was presented at the exhibition A Police Museum for Hamburg in 2007 alongside other Hamburg criminal cases – such as the serial murders of Fritz Honkas or the department store blackmailer "Dagobert" - at the Hamburg Police Museum. It is also the subject of guided tours through St. Pauli. In 2011, Norddeutscher Rundfunk took the 25th anniversary of the murder-suicide as an opportunity for renewed documentation.

=== Politics ===
The sensationalized murder-suicide brought the topic of organised crime into the political debate while a judicial scandal followed in the wake of the case, focused on the insufficient security precautions in Hamburg prisons and the leniency of investigators towards Pinzner. In addition to the smuggled revolver, Werner Pinzner had also been supplied with drugs, indicating significant safety deficiencies. Eva Leithäuser (SPD), the minister for justice, was publicly criticized because of the penal system she represented, while Rolf Lange (SPD), the interior minister, was criticized because of the so-called Hamburger Kessel, and both were criticized due to public concern about increases in crime. Due the criticism and the perceived precarity of the local SPD government, which was anticipating elections on 9 November 1986, the two ministers resigned on 6 August 1986. Nonetheless, the election did not turn out well for the SPD, which gained slightly fewer votes (41.7%) than the CDU Hamburg (41.9%), leading to an unusual minority parliament without a coalition agreement.

To prevent similar incidents, security gates were installed at the entrances to the police headquarters. General investigations of Hamburger defence lawyers followed the incident, but were met with considerable resistance from the Hamburg Bar Association, the Hamburg Criminal Defense Lawyers' Working Group and the Republican Lawyers' Association.

=== Arrests ===
Charges were brought against Pinzner's lawyer - Isolde Oechsle-Misfeld - and three of her clients. At the trial against Isolde Oechsle-Misfeld, the court appointed an expert, Herbert Maisch, who testified that she had become so entangled in the case due to severe developmental disorders in her childhood and adolescence that she was no longer able to free herself from it. She eventually received six-and-a-half years in prison as an accessory to murder and lost her law licence for five years. In 1989, two of Pinzner's accomplices, Armin Hockauf and Siegfried Träger, as well as "Wiener Peter", received life sentences. The latter was expelled to Austria in February 2000 after serving 14 years. In October 1989, Kalle Schwensen, Reinhard Klemm, and Holger Sass were sentenced to three and three-quarter year prison sentences by the Hamburg Regional Court for procuring the gun Pinzner used in the murder-suicide.

In addition to the criminal proceedings, the judiciary repeatedly dealt with the consequences of Pinzner's actions in terms of press law. For example, Der Spiegel had to print a half-page reply after reports about an alleged man behind the murders. In 1994, the Hamburg Regional Court prohibited the journalist Dagobert Lindlau from naming Pinzner's lawyer in his book Der Lohnkiller.

== In popular culture ==
The events surrounding Werner Pinzner were seen as material for a screenplay soon after the suicide. In the decade that followed the murders, detective novels and films picked up on the subject matter of the "St. Pauli Killer". Frank Göhre dealt with the case in his St. Pauli trilogy, and Dagobert Lindlau, in his 1994 book, The Hire Killer an organised crime figure. Directed by Nico Hofmann, the 1995 film Der Grosse Abgang was based on the case and was awarded the Television Film Prize of the German Academy of Performing Arts.
