= Ida Boy-Ed =

German writer (1852–1928)

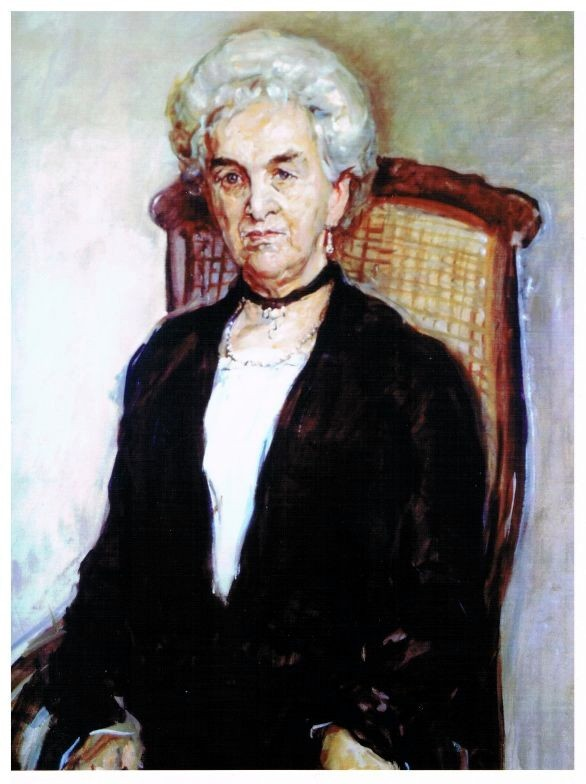
- Ida Boy-Ed by Max Slevogt
- Born: Ida Cornelia Ernestina Ed; 17 April 1852; Bergedorf
- Died: 13 May 1928 (aged 76)
- Resting place: Burgtorfriedhof

Ida Boy-Ed (17 April 1852 – 13 May 1928) was a German writer. A supporter of women's issues, she wrote widely-read books and newspaper articles.

== Early years ==
Ida Cornelia Ernestina Ed was born in Bergedorf in 1852 to a supportive family who encouraged her to write. Her father had started his own newspaper business. Her creation of short novels and other literary works was deterred when she married Carl Johann Boy at the age of seventeen.

== Career ==
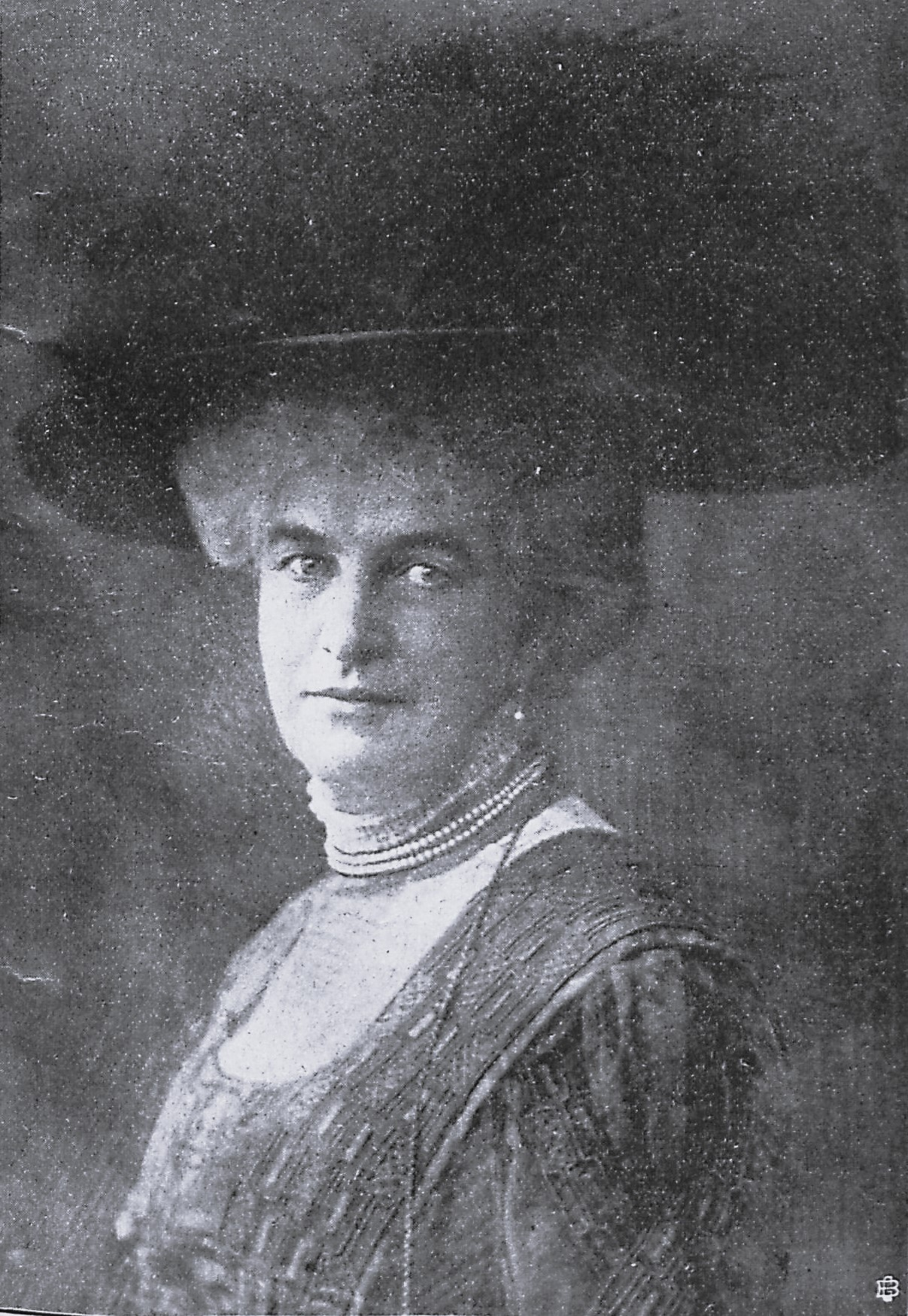
Ida Boy-Ed, 1912

Over her husband's objections in 1878, she moved out of the house she shared with his family. She took her eldest son, Karl, with her to Berlin where she intended to make her living by writing. Despite already being a published author of serialised novels and having experience in newspaper writing, she did not find success with the pieces she wrote at this time. She did, however, use her money to assist other artists. In 1880, she was obliged to move back to Lübeck at her husband's insistence as their divorce was not finalized.

Boy-Ed spent much of her spare time writing while raising her children, but did not become successful until the age of 30. A book of her novellas about the Hanseatic middle classes was the first of about 70 that she published. Boy-Ed studied and wrote about leading German women like Charlotte von Stein, Charlotte von Kalb and the French writer Germaine de Staël. Like them, she tried to support women's issues in her writings although her principal reason for writing was to make money. She achieved a wide readership for her books, as well as the hundreds of newspaper articles that she wrote. Boy-Ed invested in an impressive apartment and was a patron of the arts.

In September 1914, at the outset of the First World War, Boy-Ed's son Walther was killed in France. Undeterred, Boy-Ed wrote of the need for a mother's sacrifice. She published her ideas in 1915 under the title Soldiers' Mothers in which she makes it clear, "A mother is only dust on the road to victory". Boy-Ed's son, Karl, was the naval attaché of the German Embassy at Washington. His younger brother Emil was also a naval officer. Karl recalled that Thomas Mann was amongst the many literary and musical people who visited his mother's home. Boy-Ed died in 1928 in Travemünde and was buried in Lübeck.

== Selected works ==
- Ein Tropfen, 1882
- Die Unversuchten, 1886
- Dornenkronen, 1886
- Ich, 1888
- Fanny Förster, 1889
- Nicht im Geleise, 1890
- Ein Kind, 1892
- Empor!, 1892
- Sturm, 1894
- Werde zum Weib, 1894
- Die säende Hand, 1902
- Das ABC des Lebens, 1903
- Die Ketten, 1904
- Heimkehrfieber. Roman aus dem Marineoffiziersleben, 1904
- Der Festungsgarten, 1905
- Ein Echo, 1908
- Ein königlicher Kaufmann, Hanseatischer Roman, 1910
- Nichts über mich!, 1910
- Hardy von Arnbergs Leidensgang, 1911.
- Charlotte von Kalb. Eine psychologische Studie, 1912
- Ein Augenblick im Paradies, 1912
- Eine Frau wie Du! 1913
- Stille Helden, 1914
- Vor der Ehe, 1915
- Die Glücklichen 1916 (?)
- Das Martyrium der Charlotte von Stein. Versuch ihrer Rechtfertigung, 1916
- Die Opferschale, 1916
- Nur wer die Sehnsucht kennt..., 1916
- Erschlossene Pforten, 1917
- Aus Tantalus Geschlecht, 1920
- Glanz, 1920
- Um ein Weib, 1920
- Germaine von Stael. Ein Buch anläßlich ihrer..., 1921
- Brosamen, 1922
- Fast ein Adler, 1922
- Annas Ehe, 1923
- Das Eine, 1924
- Die Flucht, ca. 1925
- Aus alten und neuen Tagen, 1926
- Gestern und morgen, 1926
