= Lothar Malskat =

German painter (1913–1988)

Lothar Malskat (May 3, 1913 – February 10, 1988) was a German painter and art restorer who repainted medieval frescoes of the Marienkirche in Lübeck, critically damaged during WWII.

== Life and career ==
Malskat was a painter from Königsberg.

=== Schleswig Cathedral ===
In 1937, Ernst Fey and Dietrich Fey were tasked with restoring murals in Schleswig's Cathedral of St. Peter. The Feys hired Malskat to assist. They intended to remove August Olbers' inauthentic additions, made in a heavy-handed restoration of 1888, and restore the medieval paintings to their former glory. However, scraping away Olbers' paint removed most of the original work. Rather than admitting the problem, the Feys decided to have Malskat repaint the murals from scratch and pass off Malskat's paintings as a restoration of the originals. However, Malskat made several anachronistic mistakes including turkeys (which were unknown in 14th century Europe) and modeling the Virgin Mary's face after Austrian movie star Hansi Knoteck. The restoration was well received at the time. Alfred Stange, art historian at the University of Bonn, praised it as “the last, deepest, final word in German art.”

=== Marienkirche ===
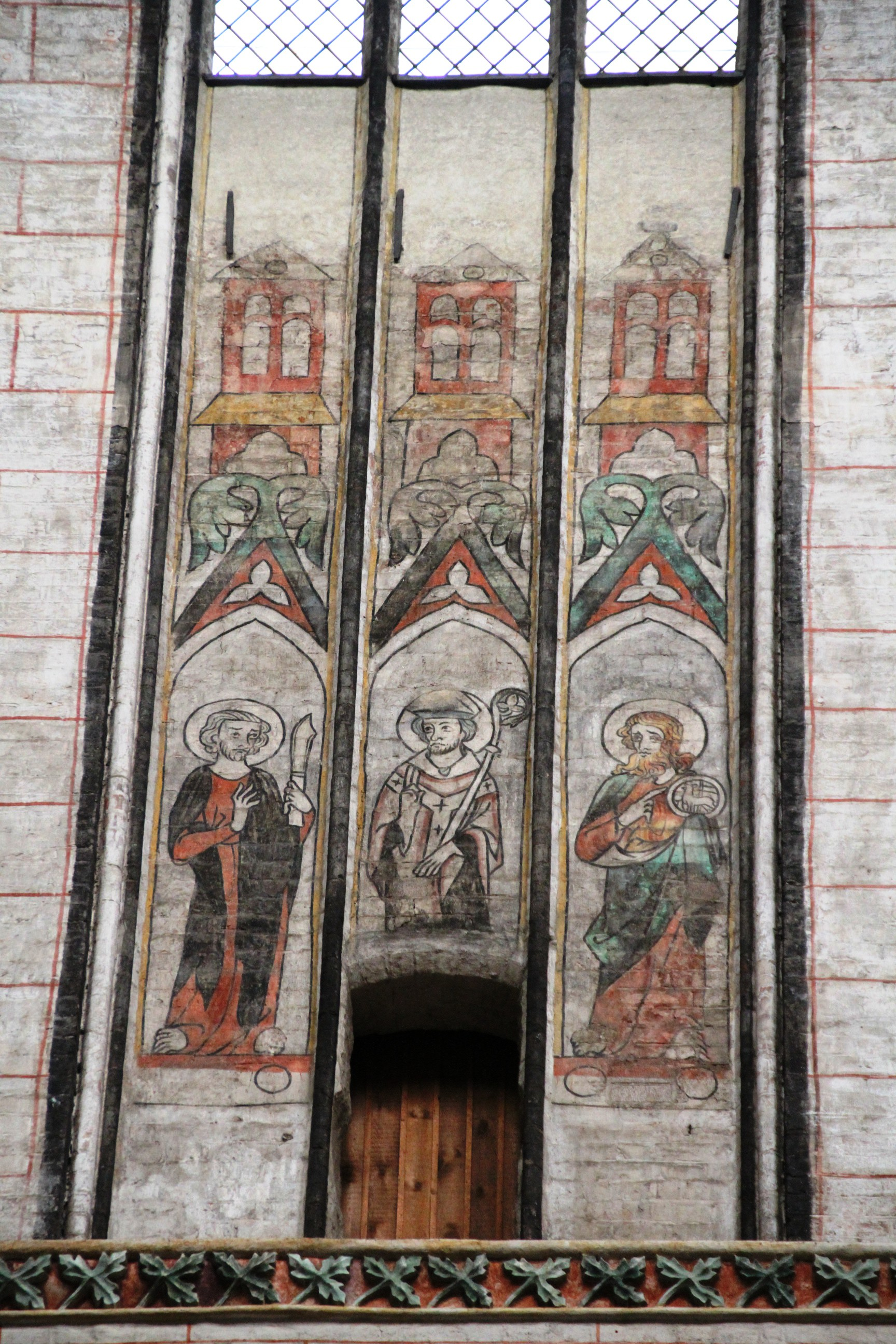
Some of the frescoes at Marienkirche that Malskat claimed to have painted

In 1951 he was employed by Dietrich Fey, whose firm was commissioned to restore the frescoes of cathedral of Marienkirche in Lübeck. The cathedral had been severely damaged in World War II bombings and left neglected after the war, so the medieval frescoes on its walls had nearly disappeared. The church had received donations worth DM 150,000 for restoration and Fey's company did the work behind closed doors. The work was finished September 2, 1951.

The restorers were praised for their good work. The frescoes were unveiled during the seven-hundredth anniversary celebrations of the founding of the Marienkirche; dignitaries present included various government ministers, including Federal Chancellor Konrad Adenauer. The West German government printed 2 million postage stamps depicting the frescoes.

The next year Malskat announced that he had painted the frescoes himself. When he was ignored, he told his own lawyer to sue both Fey and himself. Both men were eventually arrested.

=== Trial ===
Malskat's trial began in 1954. Evidence included Malskat's other forgeries of works of Marc Chagall and Toulouse-Lautrec. One estimate of the total value of his forgeries is over 15 million Euros in today's money.

Malskat told that when the work had begun, the walls had been nearly empty of frescoes; he proved it by presenting a film depicting the unpainted walls. Instead of restoring the original frescoes, Malskat had whitewashed the walls and painted them over. Malskat had modelled various religious figures on his sister Freyda, actresses like Marlene Dietrich and even historical figures like Rasputin.

Fey was sentenced for 20 months and Malskat for 18.

=== Later life ===
After Malskat was released, he began to paint in his own name. He painted decorations on restaurants and inns, including the Tre Kronor Inn in Stockholm. He also arranged exhibitions of his works in northern Germany. He died in Wulfsdorf near Lübeck, and was buried in Burgtorfriedhof.

== In popular culture ==
A fictionalised version of Malskat's painting of the Marienkirche frescoes appears in the Günter Grass novel The Rat. Malskat's forgeries are a major theme of the novel, as a symbol of the alleged corruption of post-war Germany.
