= Burgtor Cemetery =

Cemetery in Lübeck, Germany

Burgtor Cemetery (Burgtorfriedhof)
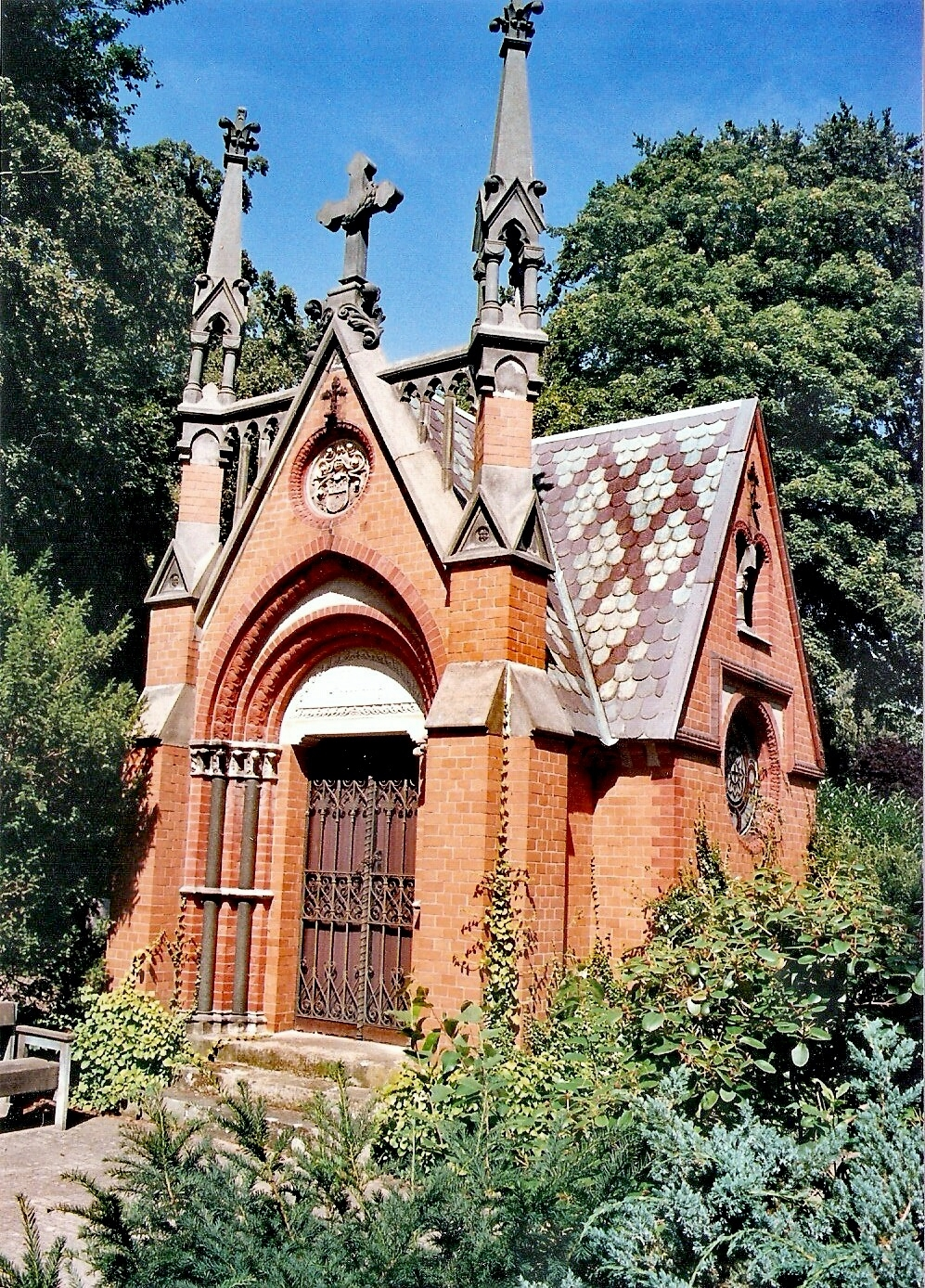
- Mausoleum of Eschenburg
- Interactive map of Burgtor Cemetery (Burgtorfriedhof)

Details
- Established: 1834; 192 years ago
- Location: Eschenburgstraße 20, 23568 Lübeck, Schleswig-Holstein
- Country: Germany
- Coordinates: 53°53′4.9″N 10°42′16.9″E
- No. of graves: 8700+
- Website: official website

Burgtor Cemetery or Burgtorfriedhof (Castle Gate Cemetery), originally the Allgemeine Gottesacker, is the successor to other cemeteries in Burgtor, Lübeck suburb of St. Gertrud. It was officially opened in 1834 and today covers an area of around eight hectares and around 8700 burial sites.

== History ==
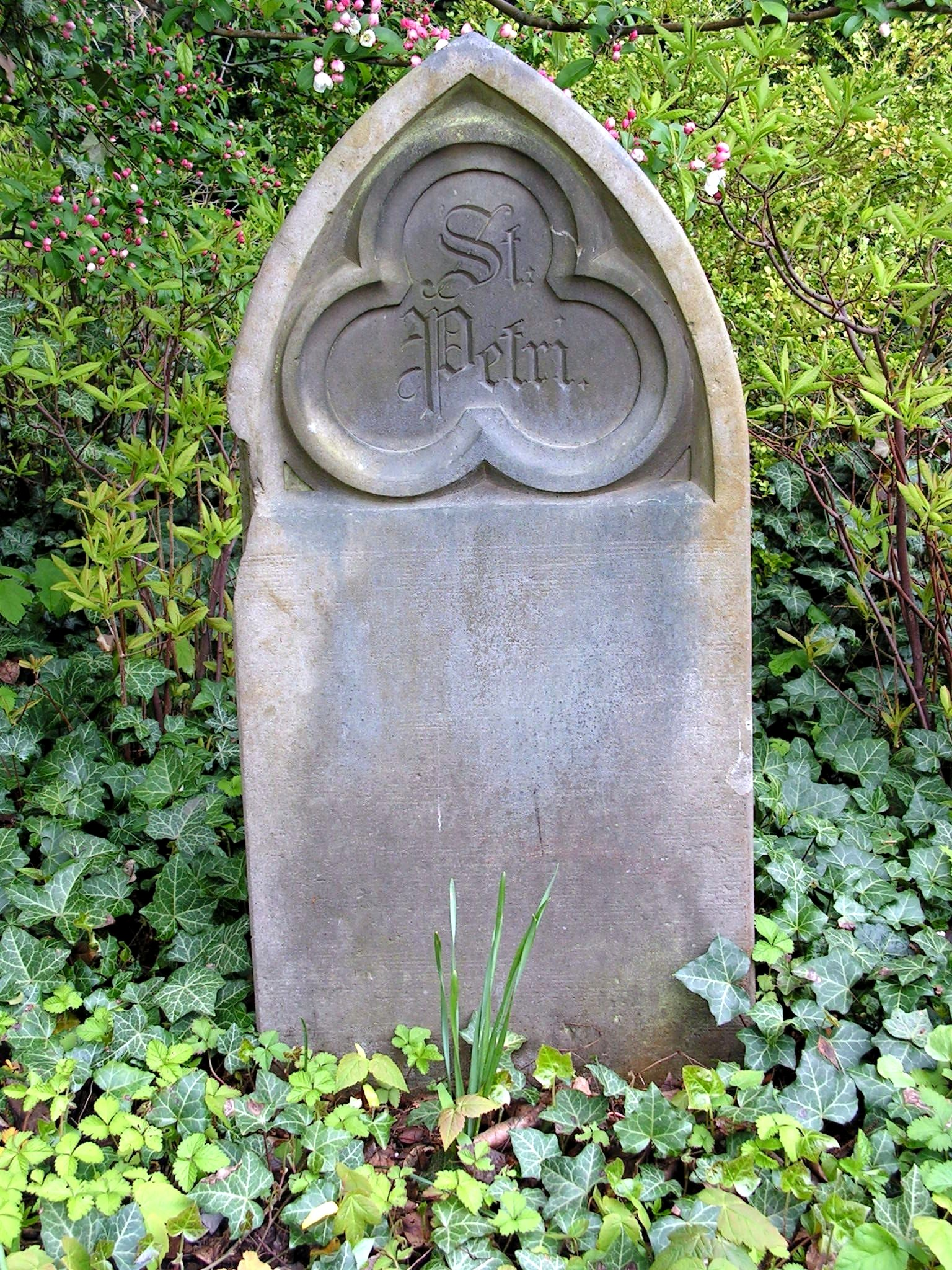
Identification of the quarters

When Lübeck was hit by the Black Death in 1350, a cemetery for the numerous victims had to be built outside the city walls. This plague cemetery was first mentioned in 1373. Later, a small chapel was added, which was named after the patron saint of travellers (Saint Gertrude; eponymous for the later district). The exact location of this cemetery is currently not known.

This burial place was moved to the north-west corner of the castle field after the chapel was demolished in 1622. Here, where the youth hostel is today, the street name Am Gertrudenkirchhof is a reminder of this time. It is also documented that no further burial sites were created at this new location after 1867. This cemetery also bore the name of the Armesünderkirchhof, since those executed from the place of execution on the other side of the street (Israeldorfer Allee/corner of Adolfstrasse) also found their last resting place here.

On 2 August 1828, the Senate decided to set up a new general cemetery in front of the castle gate. After initial resistance, under the impression of a cholera epidemic in 1832, the new cemetery at Sandberg was laid out according to plan from 1832 and inaugurated on 19 July 1832. The 7.6-hectare field of worship was initially divided into the districts or quarters of Lübeck's main churches of St. Jakobi, St. Petri, St. Marien, Dom and St. Aegidien, which jointly owned the cemetery.

The cemetery chapel was built in 1869 and the mortuary in 1892. In 1902, the new part to the north behind the mortuary was expanded, increasing the total area to eight hectares. In 1907, the city of Lübeck took over responsibility for the entire complex. The erection of mausoleums required Senate approval. Today the cemetery contains about 8700 graves.

== Notable resting places ==
Prominent people from culture, business and politics found their last resting place there. 28 members of the Mann family alone were buried here. In the cemetery, 13 graves of honour and four war graves were permanently cared for by the city. The grave of the politician Adolf Ehrtmann (1897–1979) was added as the 14th grave of honour in 2018 at the request of the “ecumenical working group of 10 November Lübeck Martyrs”.

=== Historical burial sites ===
- Henning von Arnim (1916–1990), Chief Finance President (family grave)
- Ida Boy-Ed (1852–1928), writer
- Johann Daniel Eschenburg (1809–1884), merchant and politician
- Carl Julius Milde (1803–1875), painter
- Emanuel Geibel (1815–1884), poet
- Willy (Wilhelm) Glogner (1869–1968), architect (family grave)
- Carl von Großheim (1841–1911), architect (family tomb)
- Georg Kalkbrenner (1875–1956), bearer of the Great Federal Cross of Merit (grave of honor)
- Karl Peter Klügmann (1835–1915), Hanseatic envoy at the Prussian court
- Lothar Malskat (1913–1988), painter and art forger
- Thomas Johann Heinrich Mann (1840–1891), Senator, father of Heinrich and Thomas Mann
- Emil Minlos (1828–1901), merchant, Royal Prussian Consul in Maracaibo and social reformer
- Peter Rehder (1843–1920), chief building director who laid out waterways and green spaces
- The Türk family, with Emmy Eschricht and Titus Türk
- Friedrich Krüger (1819–1896), Hanseatic envoy to the Prussian court
Special tombs

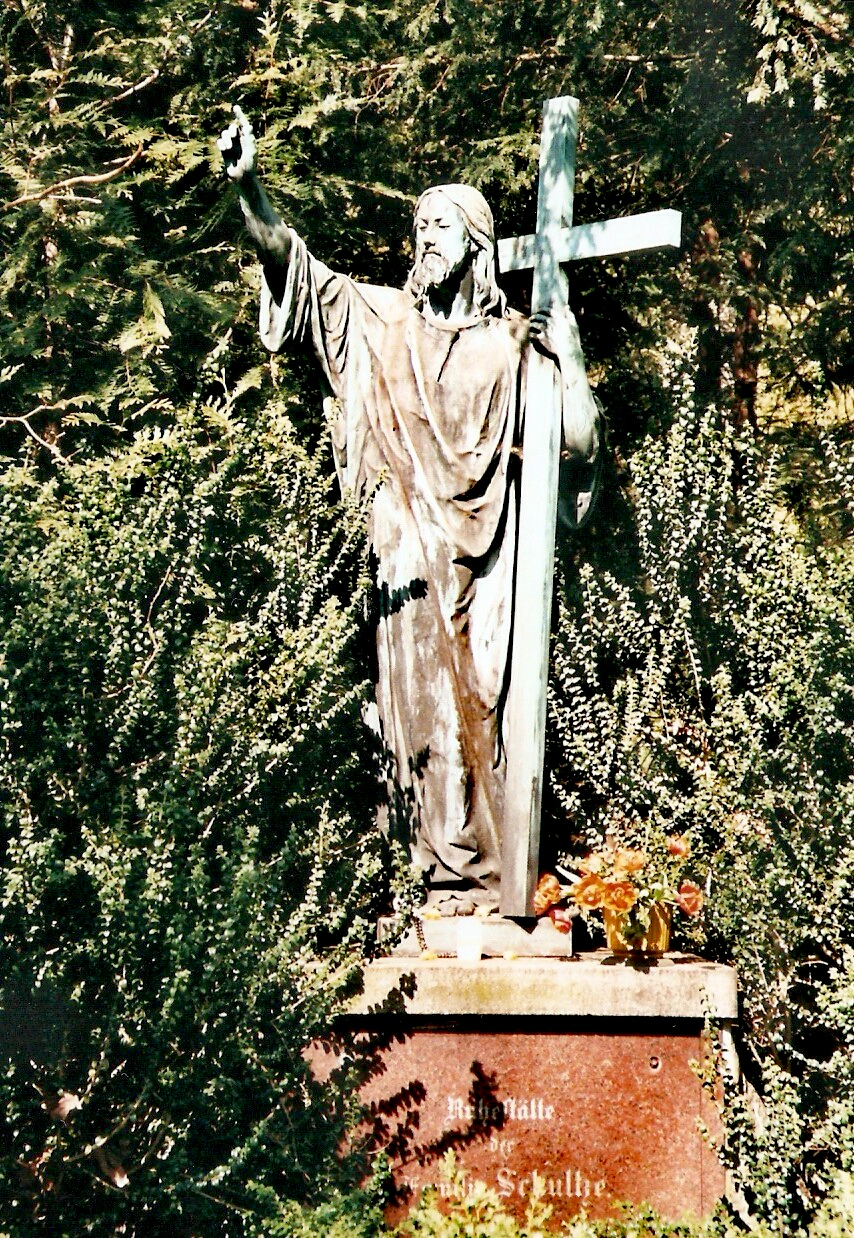
Schultze family grave. Christ statue by Lambert Piedboeuf

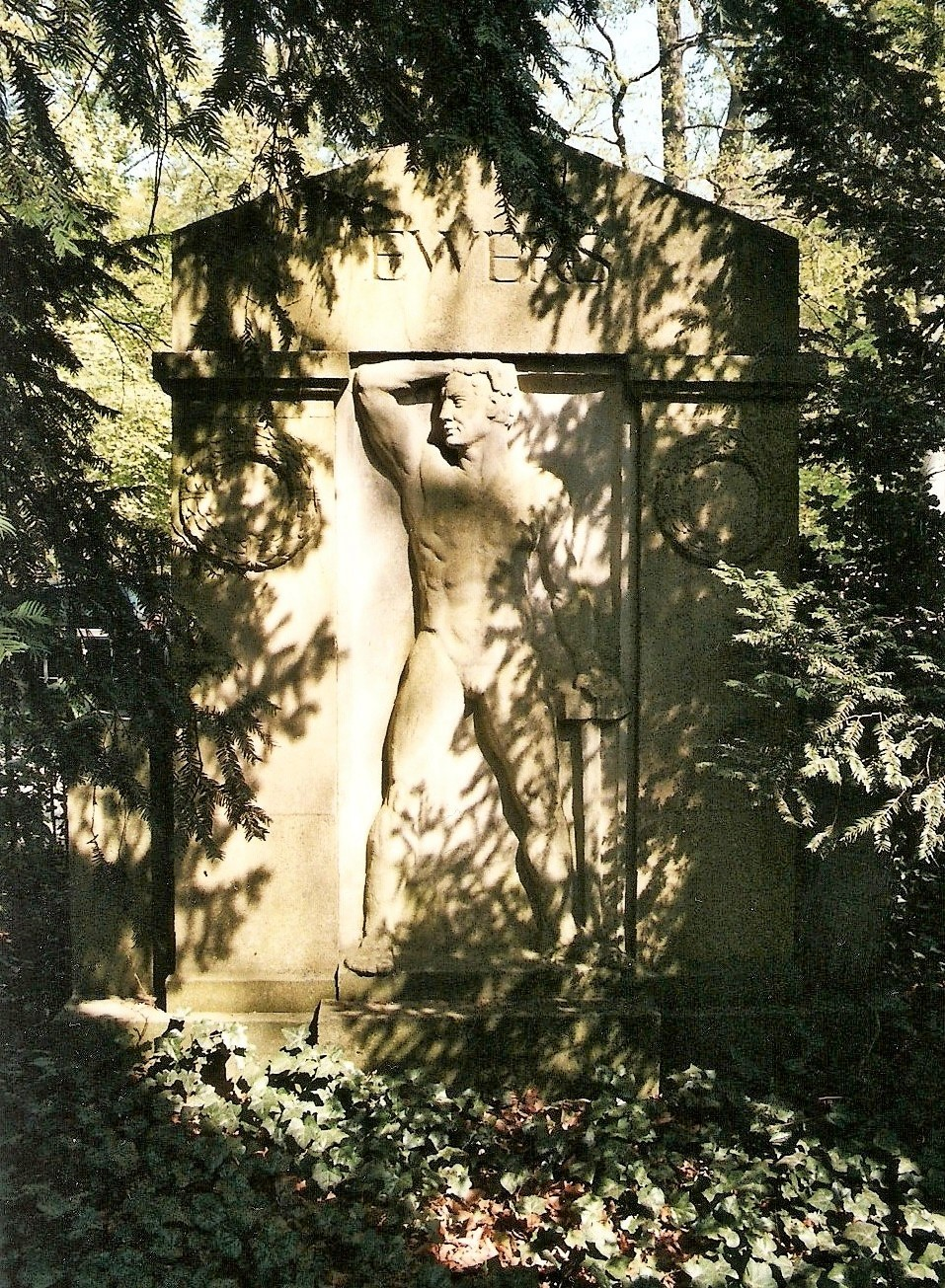
Family funeral of the Ewers family

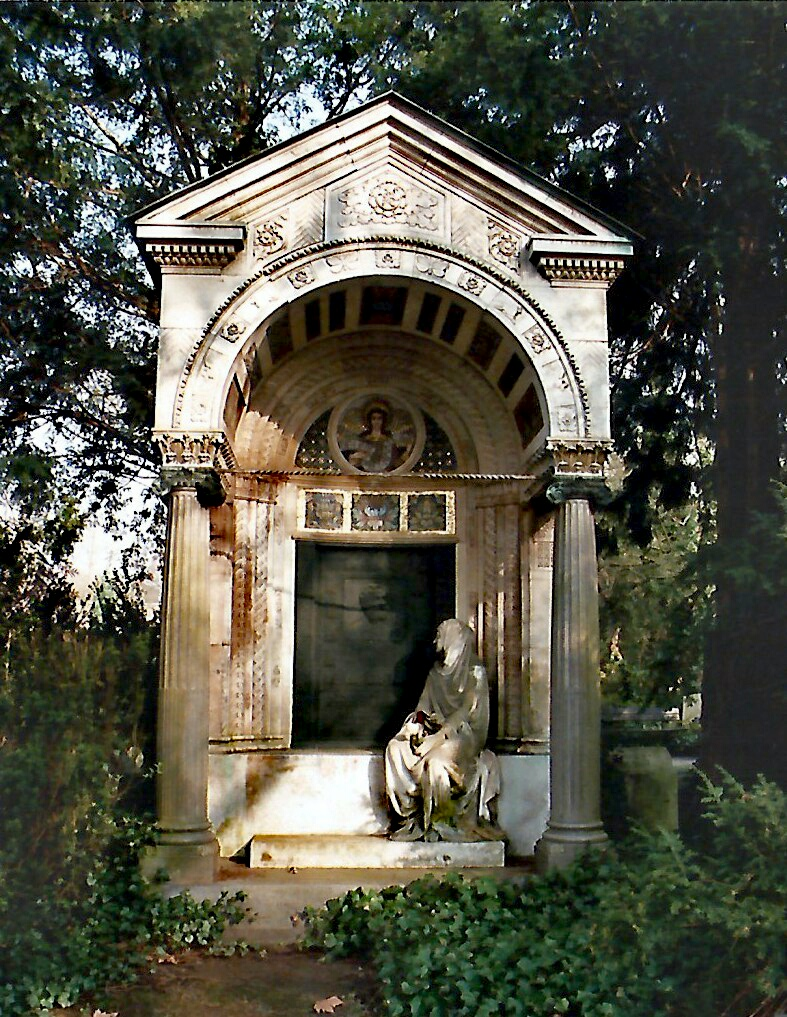
Gustav Boy (Imperial Vice Consul)

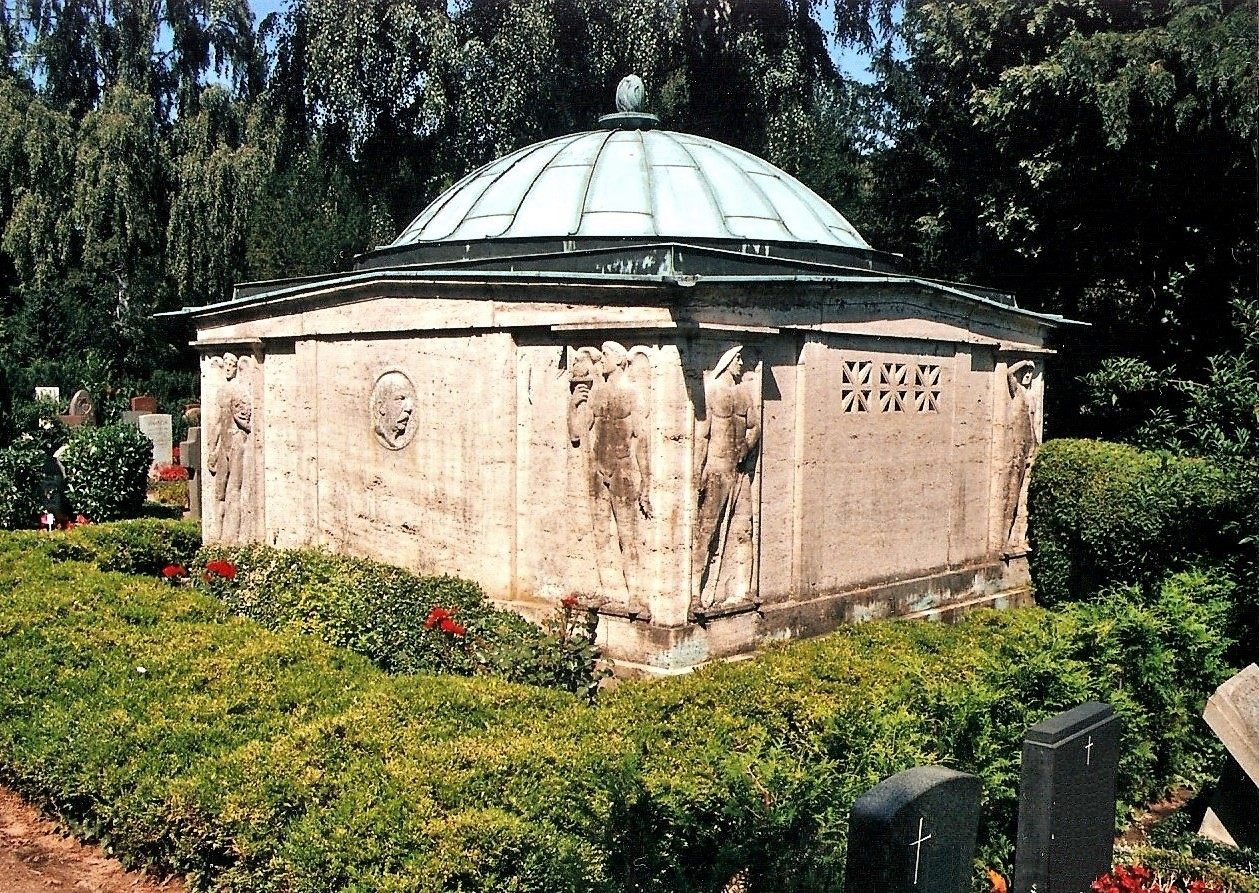
Mausoleum of Possehl

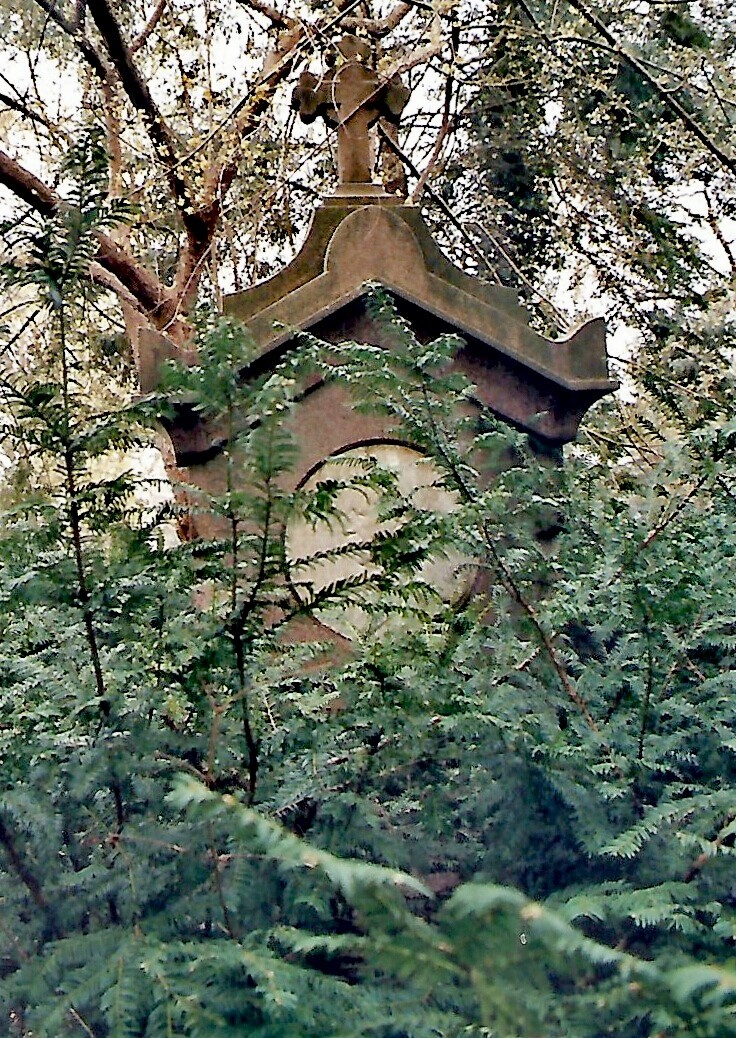
The forgotten grave of the former Hanseatic envoy

The personalities born in Lübeck who found their final resting place in the cemetery include the entrepreneur and patron Emil Possehl, whose mausoleum was designed by the architect Erich Blunck and the sculptor Hermann Joachim Pagels, the businessman Emil Minlos and the actor Günther Lüders (1905–1975).

Karl Boy-Ed (1872–1930), who is largely unknown in Germany, lies almost within sight of his mother's grave. During the First World War he was active as a spy and saboteur in the US and gained negative fame there as the notorious German Captain. Boy-Ed died on his 58th birthday after a horse riding accident.

The contract killer Werner Pinzner (1947–1986), known as "Mucki", was also buried in the cemetery.

Marianne Bachmeier (1950–1996) and her daughter, Anna Bachmeier (1972–1980) are both buried in the cemetery. Marianne became famous in Germany after she shot and killed the rapist and murderer of her daughter in an act of vigilantism in the hall of the District Court of Lübeck in 1981.

=== Abandoned tombs ===
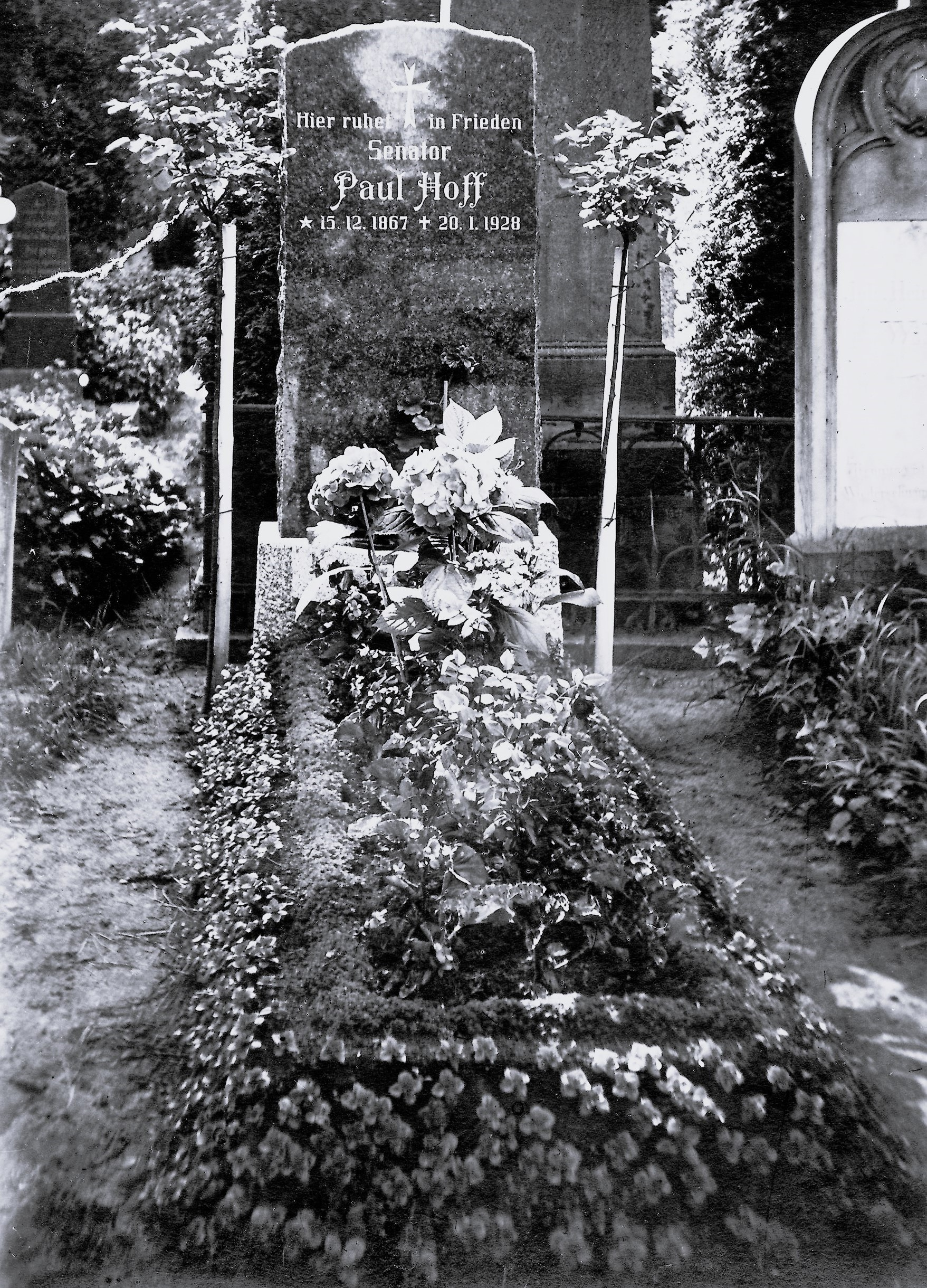
Paul Hoff

- Walther Brecht (1841–1909), under him the upward movement of the LBE took place
- August Eschenburg (1848–1910), Prussian officer, last major general
- Paul Hoff (1867–1928), committed suicide while a senator
- Wilhelm von Kettler (1846–1928), First Commander of the Lübeck Infantry Regiment, Lieutenant General, Commander in China
- Henry Koch (1832–1888), revolutionized shipbuilding in Lübeck (1997)
- Ludwig Wilhelm Minlos (1826–1895), merchant and Lübeck Senator
- Christian Reuter (1863–1915), historian and educator
- Adolf von Tiedemann (1865–1915), officer, colonialist, publicist

=== War memorials ===
For the German and French soldiers who died in hospitals in Lübeck during and after the Franco-Prussian War, common graves were laid out in the cemetery.

The grave of the German soldiers was adorned with a high, richly decorated sandstone monument, the tower-like structure of which was crowned with an Iron Cross. The dead listed on the back of the memorial came from the “garrison hospital of Mecklenburg-Schwerin. Gren. Reg. No. 89, 1st Bat."

A few steps from the German community grave is that of the French soldiers who died here, in the form of a granite boulder that was then overgrown with ivy. Its inscription indicates that the soldiers who died in the reserve hospital in Lübeck rest there.

Lübeck itself does not have a large public memorial to its fallen soldiers, mostly fusiliers from the home battalion of the 2nd Hanseatic Infantry Regiment No. 76 of that war. Those are listed on handsome plaques behind the altar of St. Mary's Church.

War graves in the Burgtor cemetery

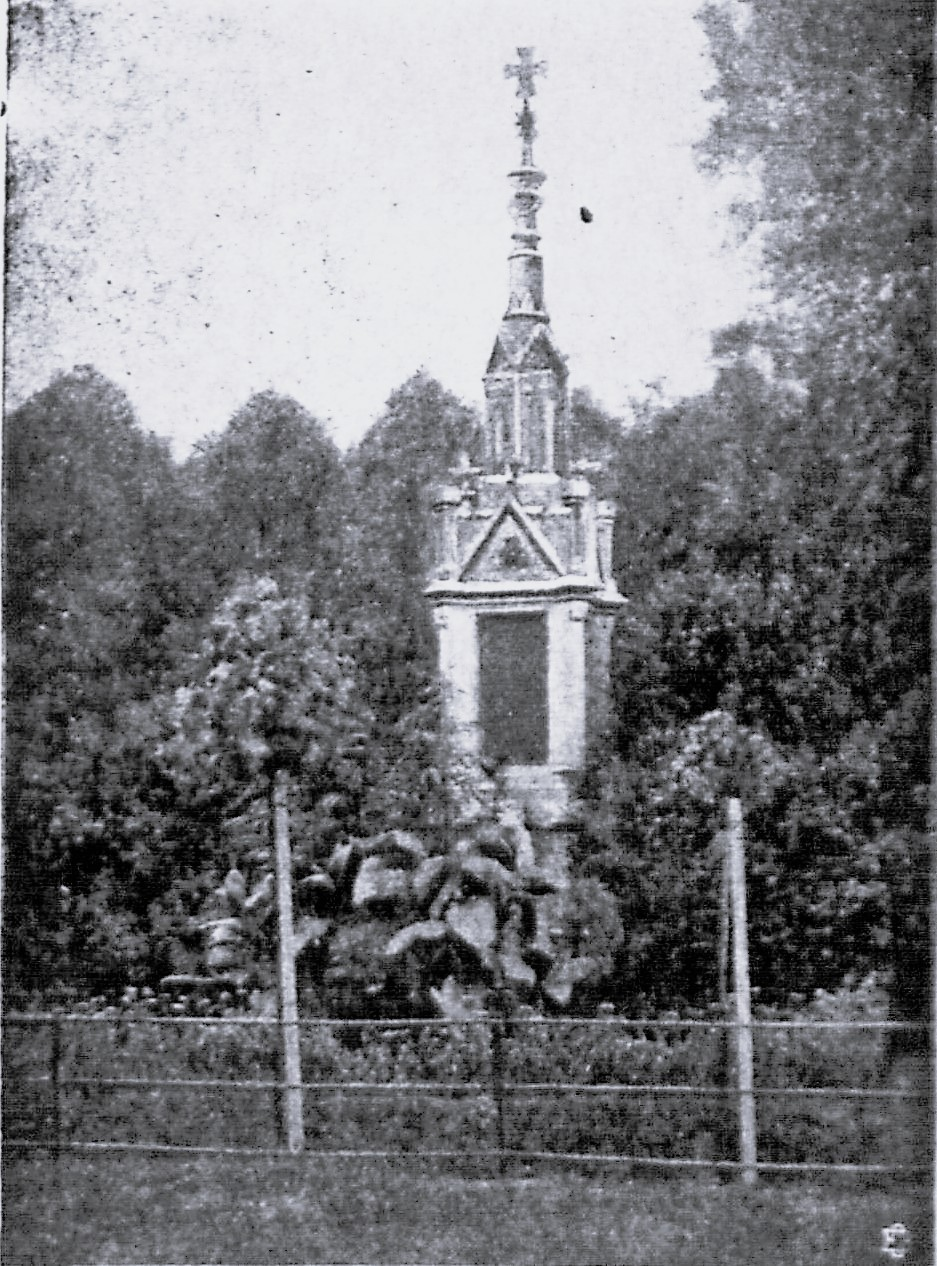
Tomb of the German soldiers

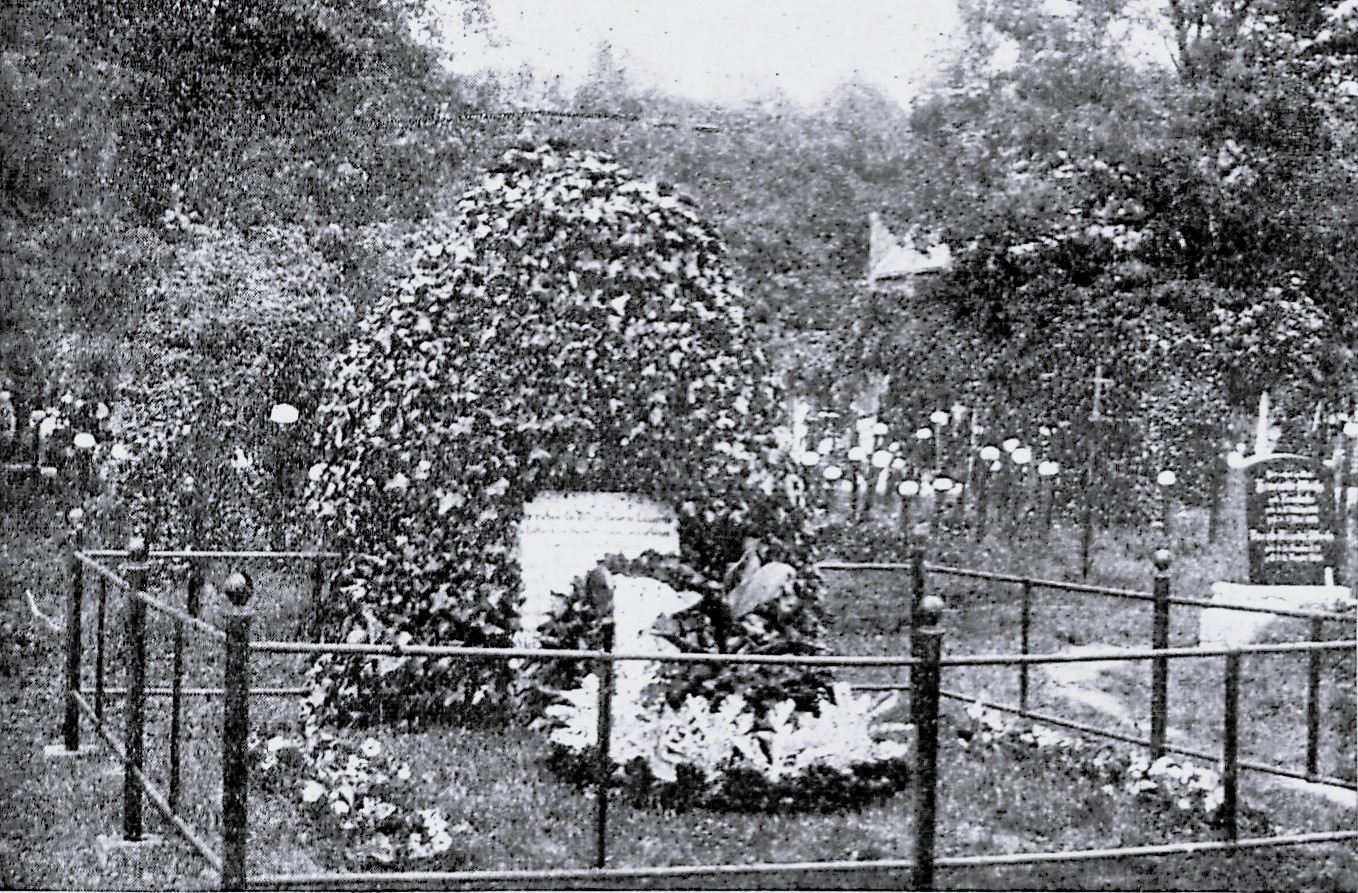
Tomb of the French Soldiers

Since 1896, the 25th recurrence of the Battle of Sedan, Sedan Day, in Lübeck replaced 18 October, the day of the Battle of the Nations near Leipzig, as a war memorial day. Since the Hanseatic city did not have a public war memorial for those who died in the Franco-Prussian War, the ceremony took place at the war graves in the Burgtor cemetery. After a service on the morning of the feast day, a long procession with funeral music made its way to the "Allgemeinen Gottesacker" to decorate the war graves, which initially lay uncovered along the path that cut the length of the churchyard. A commemorative speech and quartet singing by the united Liedertafel formed the essential part of the celebration. This ceremony took place for the last time in 1914.

For the victims of the First and later Second World War, the honorary cemetery was laid out on the other side of the road from the Sandberg in January 1915 and then expanded several times.
