= Hamburg Police =

German state police force of Hamburg

Hamburg Police Polizei Hamburg
- Logo
- Common name: Hamburger Polizei

Agency overview
- Formed: 26 May 1814
- Preceding agencies: Night watch; Port patrol
- Employees: 11.000 (2021)

Jurisdictional structure
- Operations jurisdiction: Hamburg
- Location of Hamburg shown in Germany
- Area: 755 km2
- Population: 1,769,117
- Governing body: Government of Hamburg
- Constituting instruments: Gesetz zum Schutz der öffentlichen Sicherheit und Ordnung (SOG) (Law of the protection of security and order); Strafprozeßordnung (StPO) (Code of criminal procedure)
- General nature: Local civilian police

Operational structure
- Overseen by: State Ministry of the Interior
- Headquarters: Bruno-Georges-Platz 1; 22297 Hamburg
- Senator für Inneres responsible: Andy Grote
- Agency executive: Falk Schnabel, Polizeipräsident
- Child agency: List; Führungs-und Lagedienst (Leading office); Zentraldirektion (Central office); Landeskriminalamt (State criminal police office); Wasserschutzpolizei (Water police); Verkehrsdirektion; Landesbereitschaftspolizei (State stand-by police); Zentrales Personalmanagement (Central personnel management); Verwaltung und Technik (Administration and technical)
- Units: List: Hundestaffel (Dogs group); Spezialeinsatzkommando (Special Weapons and Tactics Unit); Mobiles Einsatzkommando (Mobile Surveillance Units)
- College and schools: List: Landespolizeischule (State police school); Wasserschutzpolizeischule (School for the water police)^{[A]}; Hochschule der Polizei (Police college)

Facilities
- Stations: List: Station at Hamburg Hauptbahnhof; Wasserschutzpolizeikommissariat (WSPK)- Station Lauenburg; WSPK 1 (Waltershofer Damm); WSPK 2 (Roßdamm); WSPK 3 (Am Überwinterungshafen); WSP station 4 Cuxhaven; Polizeikommissariat (PK) 11 (Steindamm); PK 14 (Caffamacherreihe); PK 15 Davidwache; PK 16 (Lerchenstraße); PK 17 (Sedanstraße); PK 21 (Mörkenstraße); PK 23 (Troplowitzstraße); PK 24 (Garstedter Weg); PK 25 (Notkestraße); PK 26 (Blomkamp); PK 27 (Koppelstraße); PK 31 (Oberaltenallee); PK 33 (Wiesendamm); PK 34 (Wördenmoorweg); PK 35 (Wentzelplatz); PK 36 (Ellernreihe); PK 37 (Am Alten Posthaus); PK 38 (Scharbeutzer Straße); PK 41 (Sievekingdamm); PK 42 (Möllner Landstraße); PK 43 (Ludwig-Rosenberg-Ring); PK 44 (Georg-Wilhelm-Straße); PK 46 (Lauterbachstraße); PK 47 (Neugrabener Markt)
- Automobiles and trucks: List: 236 Patrol cars; 114 Personnel carriers and buses; 493 Civilian cars; 44 Motorbikes; 27 utility vehicles; 136 special vehicles
- Boats: List: 2 Coast patrol boats; 8 Port patrol boats; 1 Alster river patrol boat; 6 SAR boats; 6 Utility boats; 14 Disaster control boats; 4 Inflatable boats
- Helicopters: 2 Eurocopter EC 135
- Animals: List: Dogs

Notables
- Person: Ernst Uhrlau, Head of police (1996–98)
- Award: Polizeistern

Website
- http://polizei.hamburg.de
- Police related data (number of officers, vehicles etc.) as of 31 December 2008

The Hamburg Police (German: Hamburger Polizei or Polizei Hamburg) is the German Landespolizei force for the city-state of Hamburg. Law enforcement in Germany is divided between federal and state agencies. A precursor to the agency, the Polizei-Behörde, has existed since 1814.

The State Minister for the Interior (Senator für Inneres) oversees the Hamburg Police, which consists of aviation, water, road and port patrols, and crime investigation. The city of Hamburg is served by police stations (Polizeikommissariate) of the Uniformed Police (Schutzpolizei). Head of police is Polizeipräsident Ralf Martin Meyer. In 2008. the police had 500,335 deployments.

== History ==
Before the police force was established, there was a night watch (German: Wochenwärter, lit. week wardens) and a port patrol. The night watch was a professional force whose duties included calling the hours at night and closing the city gates. In 1671, the watch was reorganised along the lines of the Schutterij in Amsterdam, and in 1770, 284 men operated in 64 districts. In 1787, a force patrolling the port (the German: Hafenpatrouille) was established, though this was merged with the police in 1875.

Before the French occupation of Hamburg (1806–1814) the Wedde was the government agency collecting fines, and the Prätur an agency — more like a court — to arbitrate, e.g. in cases of bankruptcy, or differences on rental fees. In 1814, the government of Hamburg (Rat) established a standardised police agency (Polizey-Behörde). The former brought tasks from the Wedde and Prätur into the new police. The night watch and the police coexisted until 1876, when the watch was dissolved.

The night watch, Wedde, Prätur, port patrol, and later police were supported by the military. In 1842 the police consisted of 48 men and 425 members of the night watch, whilst Hamburg had a population of 200,000. In 1870, 650 Constablers, the same as the British name, were introduced to the police, including a mounted unit.

After several changes of structure and oversight agency — also the establishment of Political Police to monitor the labour movement from 1894 to 1918 — the police force was headed by a president of the police since 1912. From 1890 on, the police force began to transform into a military-like force. In 1910 rifles were bought, because of riots in Berlin. Pistols for the police were bought in 1917. After the First World War, riots and civil disorder caused the reinforcement of the police with soldiers and militia. After the period of the German Revolution of 1918–1919 the Hamburg Police had a Sicherheitspolizei (protection or security police) and an Ordnungspolizei (order police). The Order Police were stationed in barracks. In 1920, during the Kapp Putsch the police, specially the leading officers, showed itself as unreliable. After several administrative changes the Sicherheitspolizei was dissolved and replaced by the Order Police. As of 1932 the police consisted of 21 units, with 2,100 men. In 1933, there were 5,500 men, including the criminal investigation units and the administration.

=== Second World War atrocities ===
During Nazi Germany (1933–1945), the police took part in the Gleichschaltung. The state police units were transferred to the armed forces. The now 56,000 members of the Landespolizei were incorporated as self-contained police units no longer existed. In 1936 all other police units were under the control of the SS by law. The annexation of Austria, the occupation of the Sudetenland (both in 1938), and the occupation of Czechoslovakia in 1939 were accompanied by readiness exercises of the police force. During the annexation of Austria from 2,614 policemen 1,000 participated in the Verladeübung (embarkation exercise) of total 20,000 men.

Flag of the Ordnungspolizei of Hamburg during Nazi Germany.

In the course of the Nazi-Soviet invasion of Poland in 1939 three Hamburg police battalions (staff and 4 companies) were deployed to Poland along with the Wehrmacht army. The battalions stationed (among other places) in Kielce, Tomaszów, and Końskie. All units took repressive measures against the civil population or were in combat against the regular Polish army, guarded prisoner-of-war camps, participated in drumhead courts-martials, performed with the SS the so-called resettlement of the native populations, executed the so-called hostages, and carried out Jew hunts and mass shootings. For example, on 13 July 1942, the Hamburg Reserve Police Battalion 101 companies stationing in Zamość, Biłgoraj, Radzyń Podlaski and later in Łuków County, under the command of Major Wilhelm Trapp executed 1,500 Polish Jews, men, women and children in the forest near Józefów, Biłgoraj County. On 19 August 1942, the 2nd company of Battalion 101 executed in a mass shooting action some 1,700 Jewish people from Łomazy according to German documents, aided by Ukrainian Hilfswillige known as Trawnikis. After the war, Trapp and several others were investigated by British authorities and Polish Military Mission and extradited to Poland in 1946. In July 1948 Trapp was sentenced to death in Poland and executed. In the 1960s the involvement of policemen from Hamburg was investigated also by the German prosecutors. In 1964, several men were arrested and held in custody. In 1968 the verdicts were passed: 3 men sentenced to 8 years imprisonment, one to 6 years, and one to 5 years. Six other — all lower ranks — were found guilty but not sentenced. Since the 1980s the Hamburg State Ministry of the Interior researched the history of the police force during the Weimar Republic and Nazi Germany.

=== After the war ===
In the first days of the British occupation of Hamburg, policemen showed the British forces the way. From 1945 onwards, the Hamburg Police was directly under the administration of the British forces, until First Mayor of Hamburg Max Brauer was installed as head of the police ministry in 1947. After several changes, in 1962 an interior ministry was formed and succeeded the police ministry. Senator Helmut Schmidt was the first minister of the interior.

In their research Norbert Steinborn and Karin Schanzenbach — later published as a book titled Die Hamburger Polizei nach 1945 — ein Neuanfang, der keiner war — (The Hamburg Police after 1945 — a new beginning that was not) — described the situation of the police force after the Second World War, the process of denazification, the development up to the North Sea flood of 1962 and the following incorporation of the police into the State Ministry of the Interior.

On 3 May 1945, the first order for the police force in Hamburg by the 609 Detachment Hansestadt Hamburg, the military administrative government for Hamburg, was to stand by armed. On 7 May 1945, precise regulations for the German police offices were published. In 1945 head of the police was the British Colonel Michel O'Rorke, chief of the Public Safety Branch. At the beginning of May 1945, the police force had 1,720 active officers, 3,456 reserve officers, 7,000 air safety officers, and 585 criminal investigation officers. More than 2,000 officers were on "foreign missions" — the Nazi term for war activities — or prisoners of war. The first political cleansing was the lay-off of the air safety police and the reserve police. Most Nazi-leaders and Gestapo members disappeared before the British occupation because they feared prosecution. In June 1945, the more than 100 leading police officers were impeached and by May 1950 more than 1,300 officers of the medium and higher ranks had to leave the police force, although some were later hired again. The leading positions were filled with former officers whom the Nazi system had persecuted. Bruno Georges, a member of the Social Democratic Party of Germany., was the first chief of police.

In 1947, the British Military Government gave control of the police force to the Hamburg Government and the first chief of the police office was First Mayor Max Brauer. The Government of Hamburg was not satisfied with the new Police Law which was based on British police regulations and, e.g., banned officers from being in a political party or union.

During the 1950s the police force was often in confrontation with strikers. In 1952, a strike of 175 chemical workers was described by the media as political and the head of the workers council as a communist. The police were used to protect strike-breakers. In June 1952, Chief of Police Georges told the police commission that a disproportionate number of police officers, more than 90 daily, had been in action for such a small company. The strikes and student demonstrations were one argument to establish a police support unit Bereitschaftspolizei.

In 1975, the police horse units were abolished. 42 horses and 52 officers had patrolled the Harburg Hills and other areas in the suburbs of Hamburg.

In 1995, in context with the Hamburg police scandal (See below: Controversies and incidents), the office of Police Commissioner was initiated. In 1998, State Traffic Administration (German: Landesverkehrsverwaltung) was outsourced as a separate company (German: Landesbetrieb Verkehr). In 2004, the police was more centralized, e.g. the state police offices (German: Landespolizeidirektionen) were dissolved.

== Organisation ==
The Ministry of the Interior has the legal and technical oversight for the law enforcement agencies. The current Minister of the Interior is Andy Grote (SPD). Since 2023 Falk Schnabel is president of the police.

The Polizei Hamburg consists of the Zentraldirektion (Central Directorate) of the uniformed Protection Police (Schutzpolizei) with its regions City / West, East, and South, and their police stations (Polizeikommissariate [PK]), the Landeskriminalamt (lit. state criminal police office), the Wasserschutzpolizei (Water Police) controlling traffic in the port of Hamburg, the Landesbereitschaftspolizei (lit. stand-by or readiness police), the Traffic Office (Verkehrsdirektion), and several other administrative offices.

Units are among others the Criminal Investigation Services (Kriminalpolizei), the Special Task Force (Spezialeinsatzkommando) Special Weapons and Tactics Unit and Mobile Surveillance Task Force (Mobiles Einsatzkommando) The Polizeiverkehrskasper, is a Punch used in kindergartens to educate children since 1948. The helicopters and the police orchestra are units of the Stand-By Police.

Schools for the Hamburg police are the state police school and the school for the water police. The school for the water police is also the central educational institution for all German state water police units. The Police College Hamburg (German: Hochschule der Polizei Hamburg) offers a bachelor's degree for police officers of higher ranking and security managers.

Hamburg Police has its own museum. In 2009 the museum was closed for renovations. The collection started in 1893.

=== Rank structure ===
Police ranks are shown with epaulettes, the service group (ranking of a Beamter [rough: civil clerk]) is also indicated through the hatband of the peaked cap. The hatband of the senior service is gold, upper service is silver, and the intermediate service is blue. The uniformed police and the Water Police of the Hamburg Police has the following rank structure, in descending order:

Title	Epaulette
Polizeivizepräsident (Vice-President of the Police)	Blue epaulette with 3 golden stars and oak leaves
Leitender Polizeidirektor (Sold group B 2) (Police lieutenant colonel general)	Blue epaulette with 2 golden stars and oak leaves
Leitender Polizeidirektor (Sold group B 2) (Police major general)	Blue epaulette with 1 golden star and oak leaves

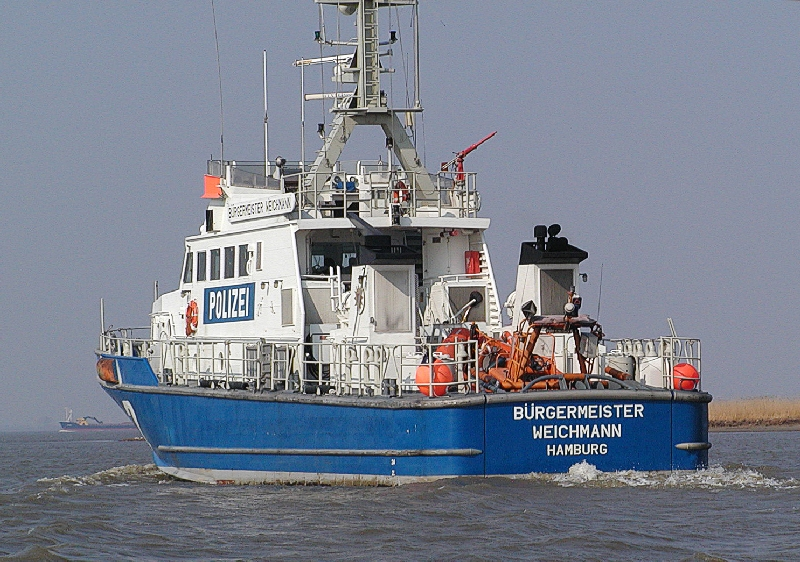
The coast patrol boat Bürgermeister Weichmann of the Water Police patrols the Elbe river.

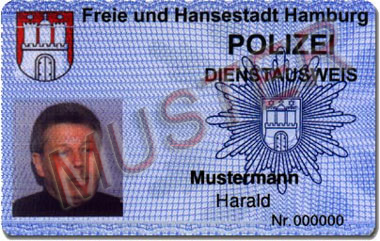
Sample of the service card.

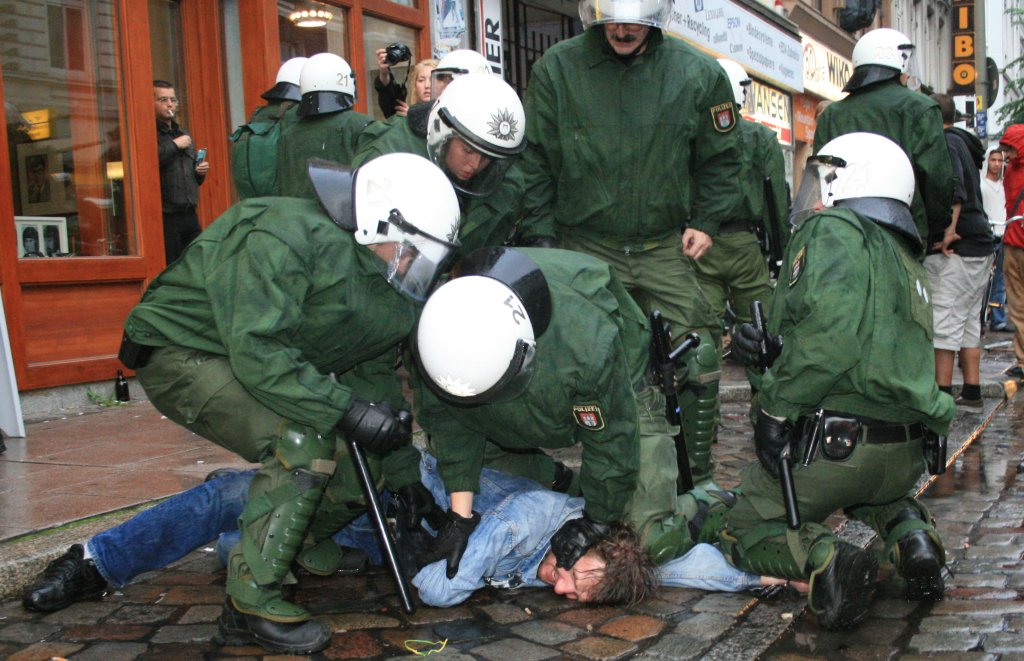
An arrest during the demonstration at the Asia–Europe Meeting (ASEM) 2007.

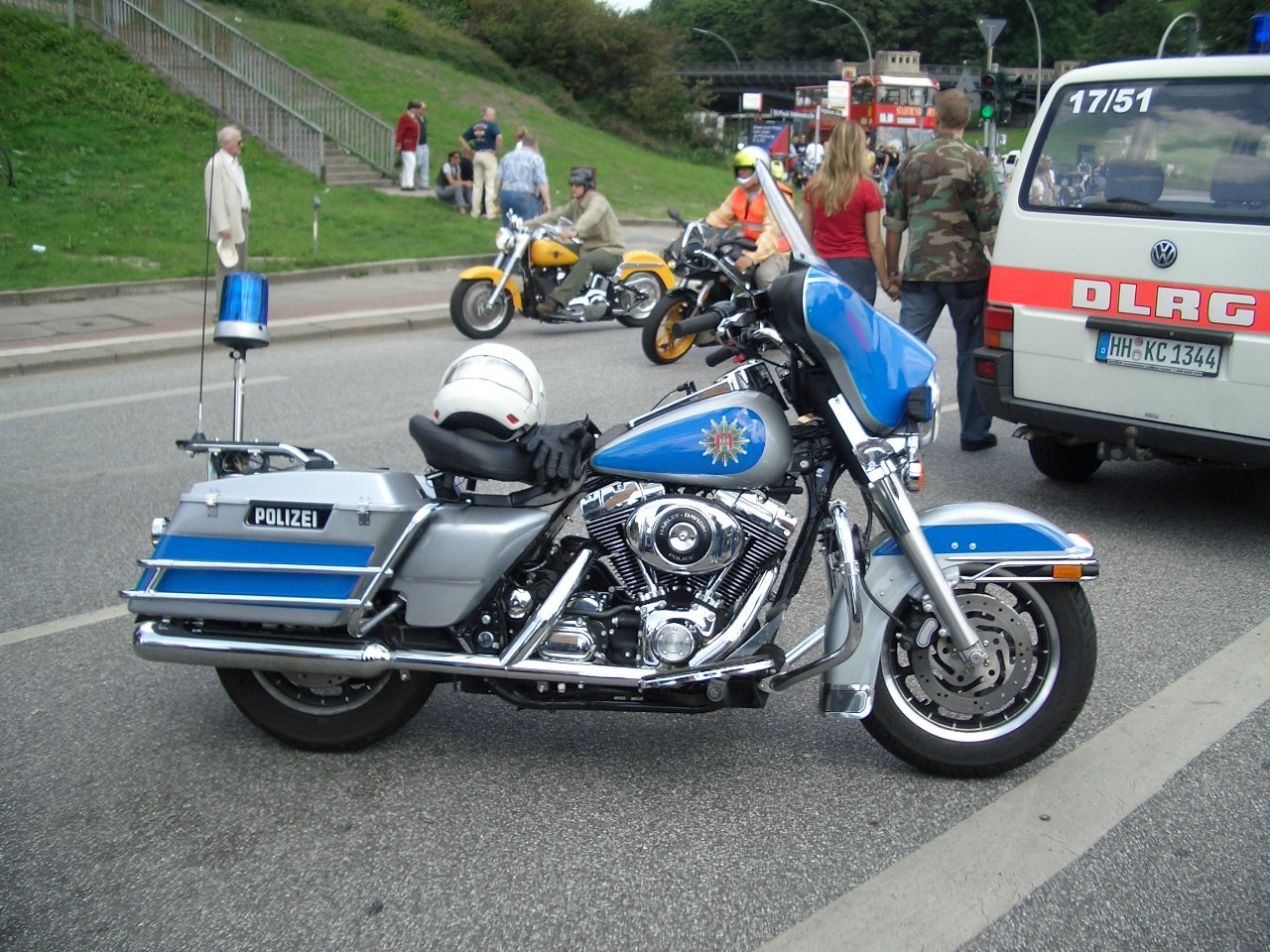
A Harley-Davidson motorbike in 2004 (not in use anymore).

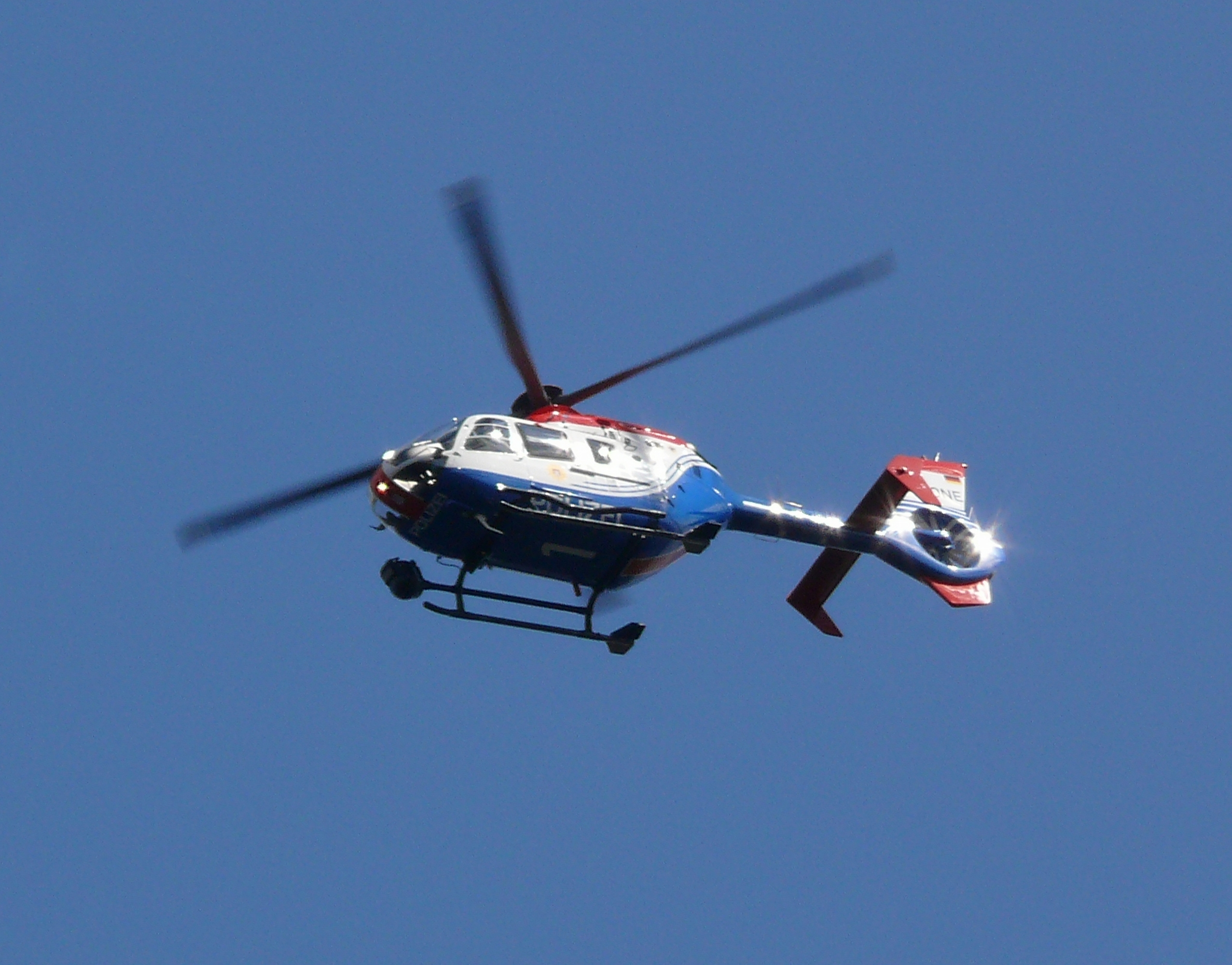
The Eurocopter EC 135 helicopter called Libelle (Dragonfly) 1.

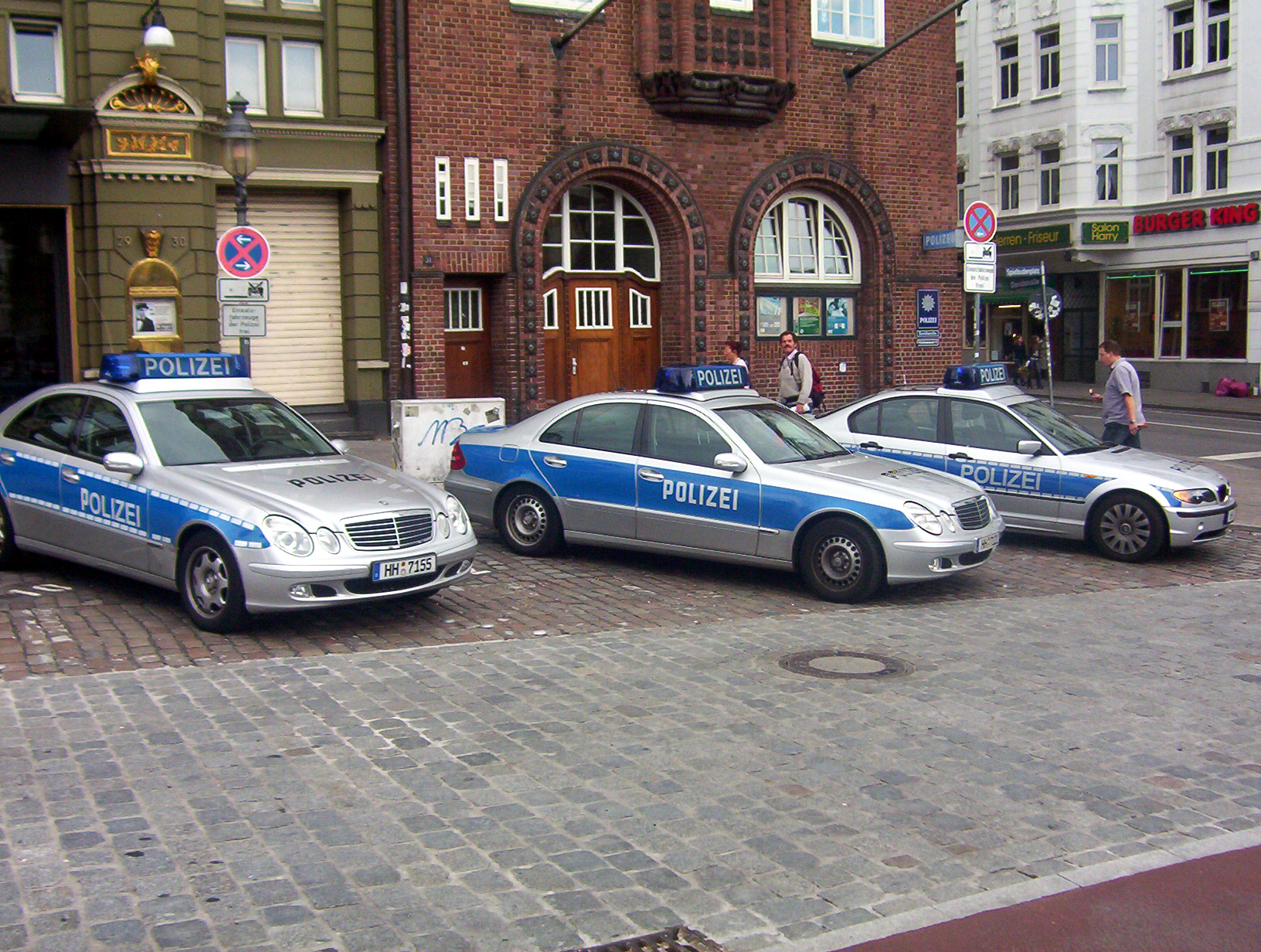
Patrol cars of the Mercedes-Benz E-Class and BMW 3 Series.

Senior service (German: Höherer Dienst)

Title	Epaulette	
	Uniformed Police	Water Police
Leitender Polizeidirektor (Police brigadier general)	Blue epaulette with 4 golden stars	Blue epaulette with a silver button and 4 big golden stripes
Polizeidirektor (Police colonel)	Blue epaulette with 3 golden stars	
Polizeioberrat (Police lieutenant colonel)	Blue epaulette with 2 golden stars	
Polizeirat (Police major)	Blue epaulette with 1 golden star	Blue epaulette with a silver button and 3 big golden stripes
Polizeirat (Police major candidate)	Blue epaulette with 1 golden band	—

Upper service (Gehobener Dienst)

Title	Epaulette	
	Uniformed Police	Water Police
Erster Polizeihauptkommissar (Police staff captain)	Blue epaulette with 5 silver stars	Blue epaulette with a silver button and big, small, small, big golden stripe
Polizeihauptkommissar (Sold group: A12) (Police senior captain)	Blue epaulette with 4 silver stars	—
Polizeihauptkommissar (A11) (Police captain)	Blue epaulette with 3 silver stars	
Polizeioberkommissar (Police 1st lieutenant)	Blue epaulette with 2 silver stars	Blue epaulette with a silver button and 2 big golden stripes
Polizeikommissar (Police lieutenant)	Blue epaulette with 1 silver star	Blue epaulette with a silver button and 1 big golden stripe
Polizeikommissar Anwärter (Police lieutenant candidate)	Blue epaulette with 1 silver band	—

Intermediate service (Mittlerer Dienst)

Title	Epaulette	
	Uniformed Police	Water Police
Polizeihauptmeister mit Amtszulage (Police staff sergeant major)	Blue epaulette with 5 light blue stars	—
Polizeihauptmeister (Police sergeant major)	Blue epaulette with 4 light blue stars	Blue epaulette with a silver button and 4 small golden stripes
Polizeiobermeister (Police sergeant 1st class)	Blue epaulette with 3 light blue stars	Blue epaulette with a silver button and 3 small golden stripes
Polizeimeister (Police sergeant)	Blue epaulette with 2 light blue stars	Blue epaulette with a silver button and small golden stripes
Polizeimeister Anwärter (Police sergeant candidate)	Blue epaulette with 1 light blue band	Blue epaulette with a silver button

== Mission ==
In 2008, Hamburg Police had 500,335 deployments (1,367 per day).

=== Tasks ===
The Hamburg Police is part of the executive. Its responsibilities are to avert danger, to maintain the public security, to render assistance, and the provision of information. Law enforcement in general under the oversight of the prosecutor, prosecution of infractions, traffic control, and administrative assistance are also tasks. Hamburg Police has several programs of prevention, like protection against burglary and traffic education.

=== Legal basis ===
Hamburg Police has the legal jurisdiction for the city-state of Hamburg. Its tasks are defined in the Gesetz zum Schutz der öffentlichen Sicherheit und Ordnung (SOG) — the state law of the protection of security and order — for acts to avert danger, and the Federal Strafprozeßordnung (StPO) (Code of criminal procedure), for the law enforcement itself.

== Stations ==
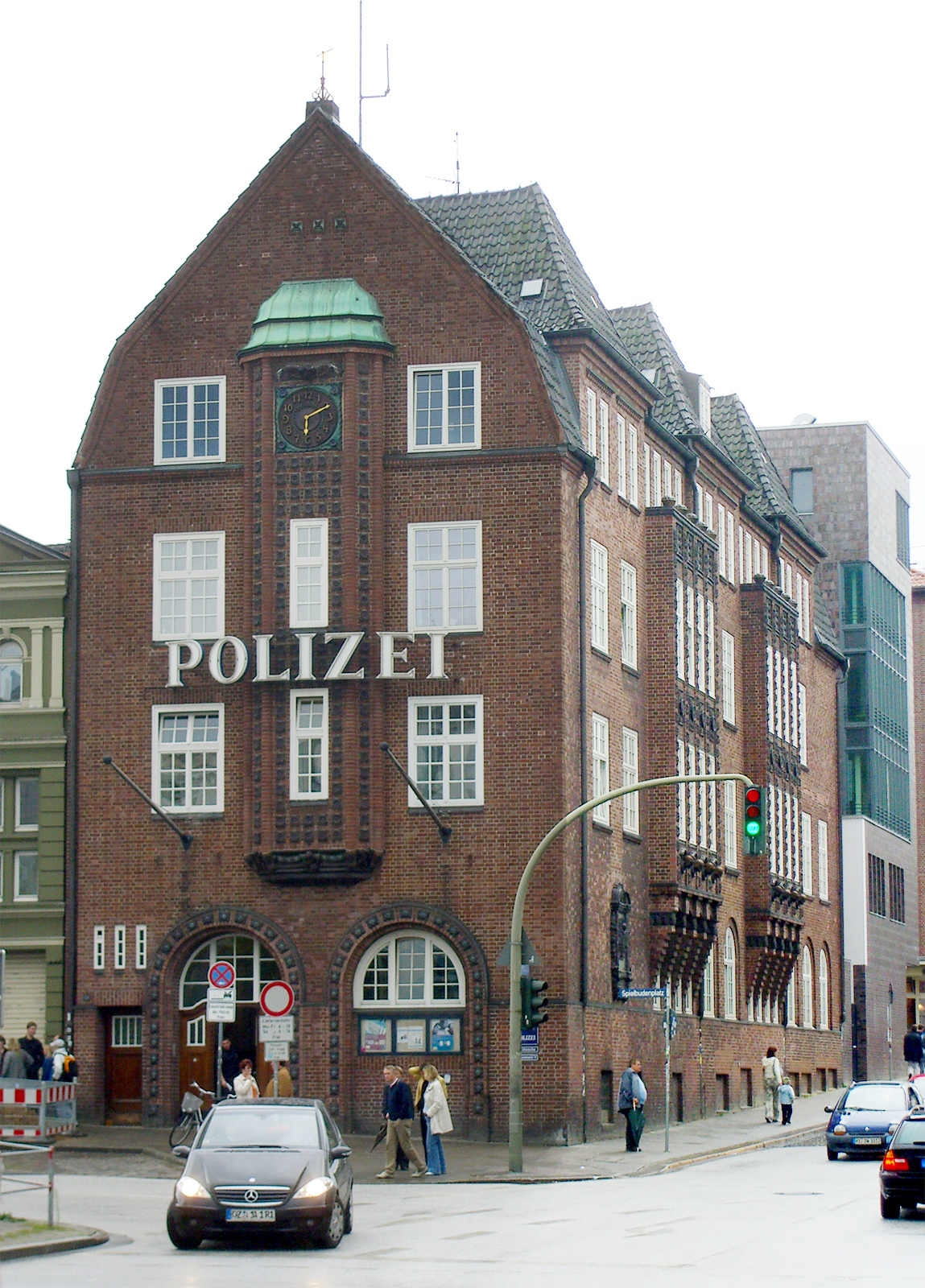
Famous police station Davidwache at Reeperbahn street

Hamburg Police stations are called Polizeikommissariate. The areas of responsibility do not correspond to the local government areas of the boroughs and quarters of Hamburg. There are 24 police stations for the uniformed police, in addition to an airport police station and a station at the main railway station Hamburg Hauptbahnhof.

The most well known station is the so-called Davidwache, officially known as Polizeikommissariat 15 and designed by Kurt Schumacher. The building was expanded in 2004, and serves the red light district around the Reeperbahn street. The station even has its own fansite (Davidwache Hamburg — Die inoffizielle Fanseite. (in German)) selling T-shirts; Jürgen Roland's 1960 film Polizeirevier Davidwache describes the work at the police station; also the film Fluchtweg St. Pauli — Großalarm für die Davidswache (International title: Hot Traces of St. Pauli, UK: Jailbreak in Hamburg) (1971) featured the station; the documentary Meine Davidwache from 2008; and the book Einsatz auf St. Pauli Geschichten aus der Davidwache by Ingeborg Donati and Thomas Mettelmann describe the all-day work of police officers.

As of 2009, the Water Police (Wasserschutzpolizei) had five stations, two of which are not actually in Hamburg. One is located at the mouth of the Elbe river in Cuxhaven, Lower Saxony, and another is a sub-station in Lauenburg, a town in Schleswig-Holstein. The other three are in Hamburg proper.

=== Headquarters ===
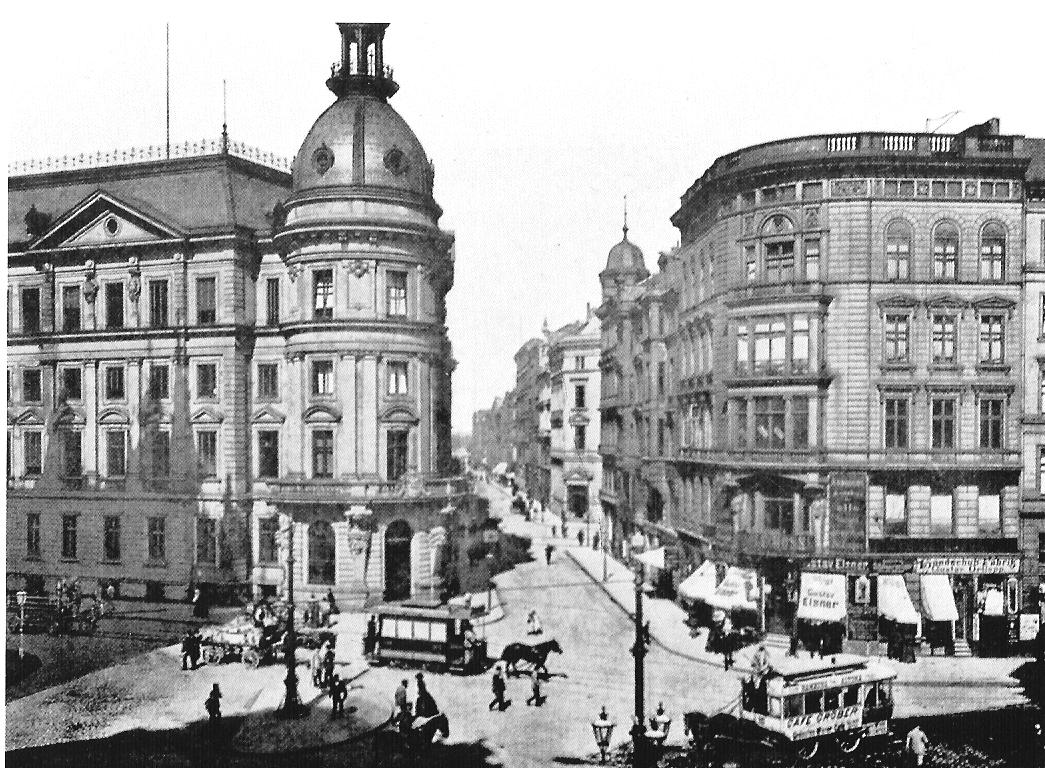
The headquarters of the Polizey-Behörde of 1814 on the left (photograph of 1892).

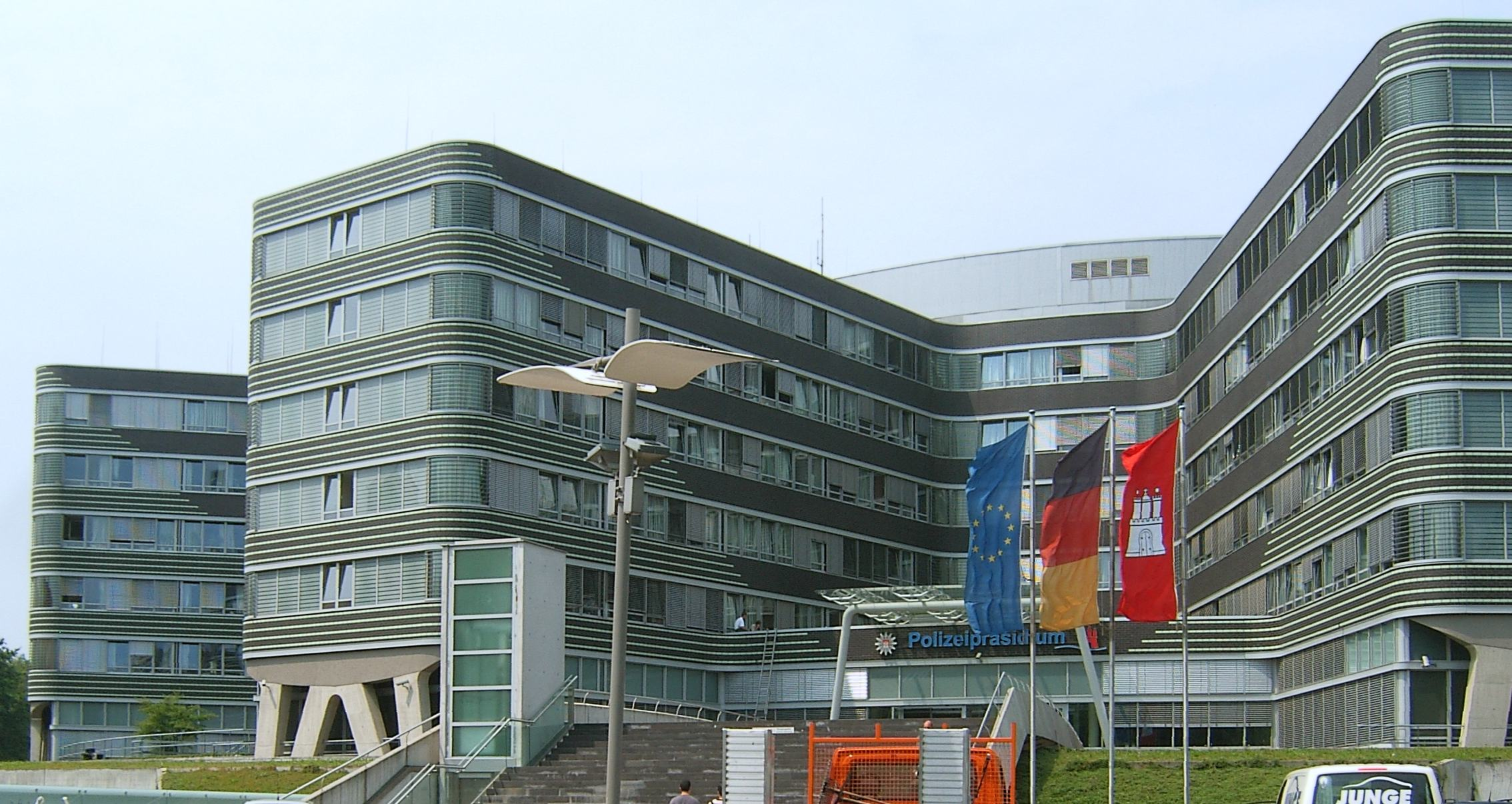
Police headquarters in 2006

The first police headquarters of 1814 was an office building at Neuer Wall. After the Second World War the police was headquartered in the 9th floor of an office building at the former Karl-Muck-Platz (now Johannes-Brahms-Platz). Later it moved to one of the first skyscrapers in Hamburg, built 1958–1962; the so-called Polizeihochhaus (Police skyscraper). In 1997 the government of Hamburg decided to build a new headquarters at the area of the stand-by police in Alsterdorf quarter. In 2000 the headquarters moved to the new building in Alsterdorf.

== Equipment ==
Hamburg Police has 9,748 employees, including 6,174 uniformed policemen, 1,521 crime investigation officers, 498 officers of the water police and 1,555 in the administration. They are fitted out with patrol cars, water cannons, helicopters, boats, and 7,176 protection vests, 9,400 riot agent canisters, 8,236 SIG Sauer P6 pistols, 34 Walther P5 pistols, 575 Heckler & Koch P2000 V2 pistols, 482 Heckler & Koch MP5 submachine guns. Communication is provided by 5,805 radio units and 1,652 mobile phones. The car pool was used for 18.3 mil. kilometer.

Since 2005, the uniformed police wear blue uniforms. Hamburg Police was the first German state police to change from green to blue. The change was initiated by the former Minister Ronald Schill. The financing model for police equipment was new to Germany, private economy granted a passive credit to the government of Hamburg, so all uniforms could be changed at once. Hamburg's Polizeieinsatzfahrzeuge — the formal name for patrol cars — are called "Peterwagen", because of a misunderstanding between a German clerk and a British officer. The clerk, wanting an authorization for new radio-controlled patrol cars, tried to spell patrol car with "P, like Peter..". The British officer interrupting "Oh, I know, Peterwagen!" forwarded the petition.

== Controversies and incidents ==
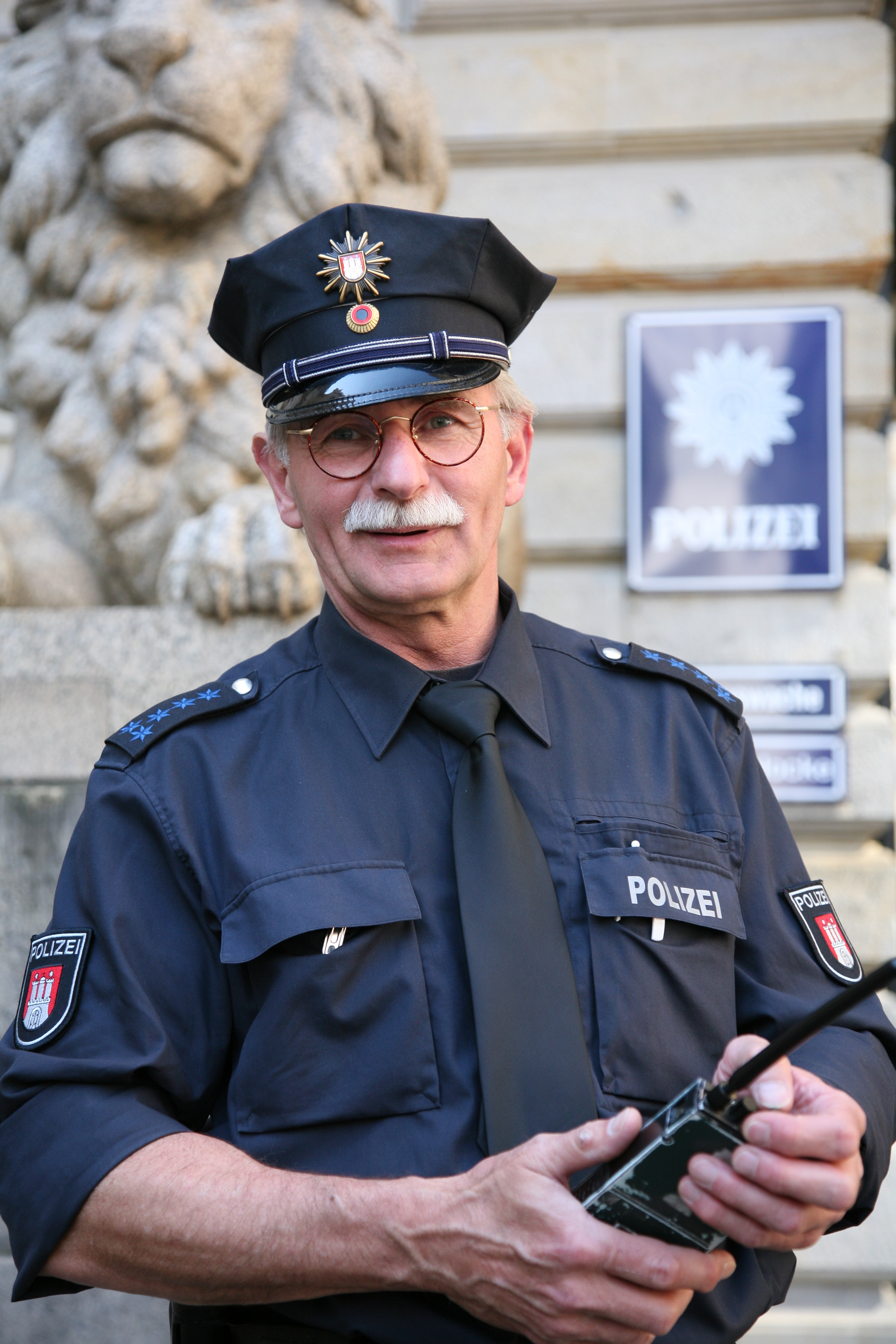
Police officer of the Hamburg police department on assignment at Hamburg city hall.

The Hamburg Police has often been criticized for single incidents like arrests, conduct during demonstrations, or false radar speed checks. Two events are notable, because of the reaction of the public, the media, the government, and their legal aftermath.

Hamburg pocket

On 8 June 1986, the Hamburg Police closed in on 861 protesters and contained them in the open area of the Heiligengeistfeld for 13 hours. The demonstrators were held without food, water and toilets. Demonstrations against the use of nuclear power developed in the aftermath of the Chernobyl disaster. On the day before, groups of protestors, on their way to the Brokdorf Nuclear Power Plant, were stopped by the police. On Sunday, 8 June, several people of the anti-nuclear movement wanted to protest against the police actions. The Hamburger Kessel (lit. Hamburg pocket, the word Kessel can also be translated as kettle.) were sentenced legal wrong, by the Hamburg regional court, and all involved were adjudged a solatium of DM200. The 4 police leaders of the Hamburg pocket were declared guilty of deprivation of personal freedom, but only admonishment and had to pay a fine.

Hamburg police scandal

In 1994 a Parlamentarischer Untersuchungsausschuss (PUA) (parliamentary commission of enquiry) was installed after the resignation of the State Minister for the Interior Werner Hackmann, because of several accusations of xenophobia, with assaults and alleged police brutality. The commission was in existence for over two years — the longest term in Hamburg's history to date. In 1996 the findings stated that right-wing extremist events in the police were no individual cases. During the investigations, State Police Colonel Heinz Krappen resigned too, but some accusations turned out to be wrong. The whole incident is known as Hamburg police scandal, and a police complaints authority — to investigate independent and unprejudiced, and to break the "wall of silence", which was often noticed during investigations within the police — was installed in 1998, but dissolved by Senator Ronald Schill in 2001.

== Line of duty deaths ==
As of 1997, Hamburg Police had lost 26 police officers since World War II. Eighteen were shot, intentionally and heinous or in effect, one plunged to death, one was knifed, and one was crushed. Six officers died in accidents. The youngest was 19, the oldest 58 years old.

== Federal and other law enforcement agencies ==
There are several agencies stationed in Hamburg proper not part of the Hamburg police. The State Office for the Protection of the Constitution (Landesamt für den Verfassungsschutz) is Hamburg's domestic intelligence agency. The Federal Police are stationed at Hamburg Hauptbahnhof and Hamburg Airport where in 2008, the first combined airport-police station for Federal and State police was established. A company of the German military police (4./FJgBtl 151) is stationed at the Reichspräsident-Ebert-Kaserne (Imperial President Ebert barracks) in the Altona borough.

Hamburg is also served by the Bezirklicher Ordnungsdienst (BOD) — comparable with the British Police Community Support Officers — employed by the boroughs of Hamburg. The BOD deals with administrative offences like not leashed dogs and vandalism.
