= Heinrich Julius Alexander von Kalb =

Heinrich Julius Alexander von Kalb or Henry Jules Alexandre de Kalb (25 November 1752 – 8 April 1806) was a German-born officer in the French Army.

== Life ==
He was born in Jena, the son of Karl Alexander von Kalb, chamber-president of Saxe-Weimar. His brother was Johann August Alexander von Kalb, who succeeded their father as chamber-president (11 June 1776 to 7 June 1782) and was caricatured by Friedrich Schiller in his tragedy Intrigue and Love. On 15 August 1770, aged 16, Kalb became a lieutenant in the Royal Deux-Ponts Regiment of the French Army. Aged 24 he rose to second lieutenant and two years later to first lieutenant. His regiment formed part of the 5,000-strong force sent by the Kingdom of France to fight for the United States in the American Revolutionary War. He was honoured for his achievements by George Washington, then general of the Continental Army, though he is often confused with Baron Johann von Kalb, also known as Johann de Kalb, who also fought in the war as a major.

On his return to Germany his brother forced him to marry Charlotte von Marschalk und Ostheim. Since he was soldiering for the rest of the year he could only spend the winter months with his wife and so the marriage proved an unhappy one, with her taking refuge in affairs with Schiller and later with Jean Paul. Divorce was soon discussed, but they had had a son together and so (formally at least) they remained married, even after unofficially separating in 1800.

The French Revolution ended his career in the French Army – he took part in Louis XVI's flight to Varennes in 1791 and was sent back to Thuringia without a pension. He tried in vain to join the army of one of the German states and in the meantime his brother had wasted the family fortune. Heinrich retired to his estate near Trabelsdorf, where he began an affair with his cook, Barbara Tod, a teacher's daughter, with whom he had three children. In 1806 he shot himself in the "Zum Goldenen Hahn" guesthouse in Munich.
