= Karl Boy-Ed =

World War I German spy (1872–1930)

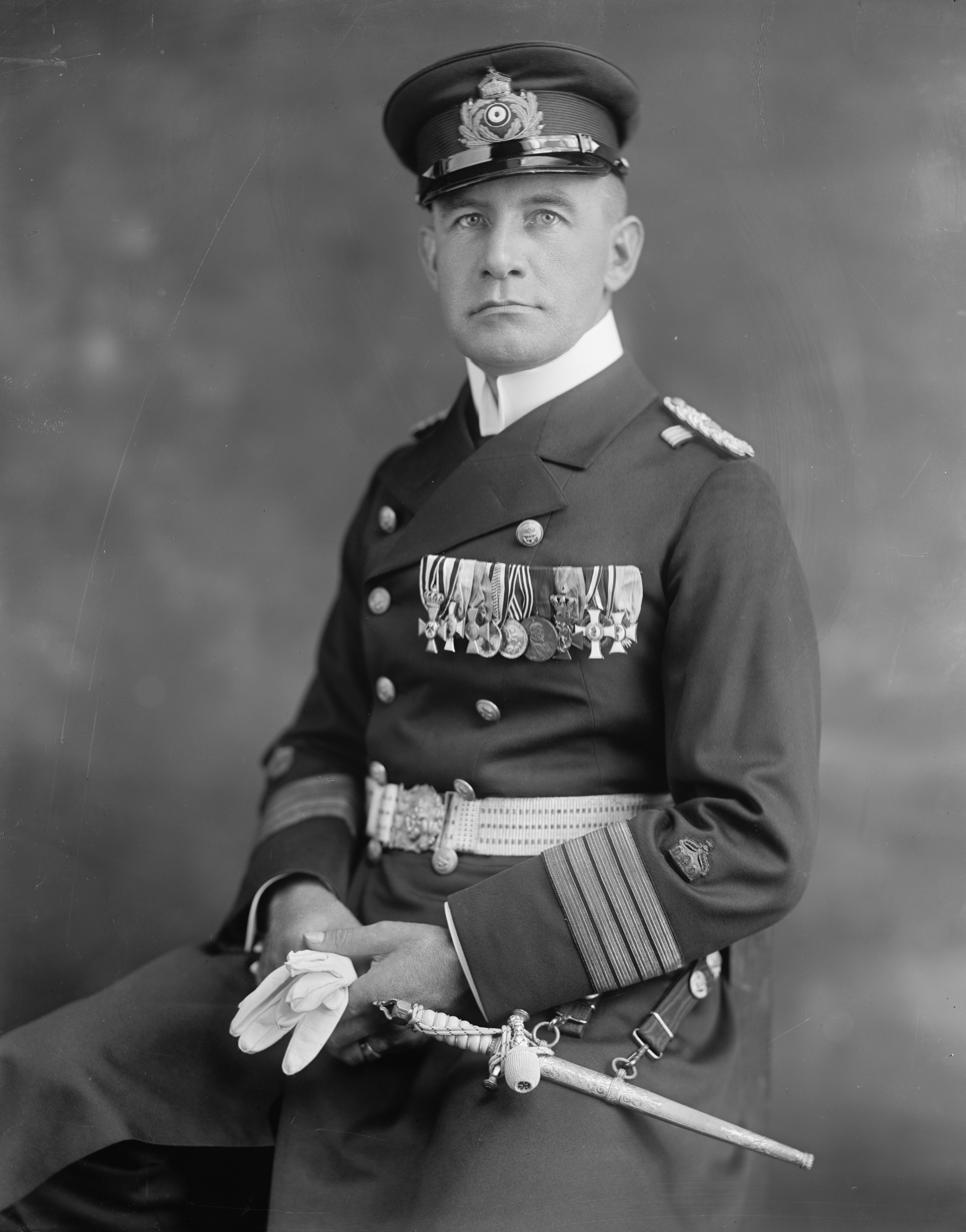
- Boy-Ed, unknown date
- Born: 14 September 1872; Lübeck, German Empire
- Died: 14 September 1930 (aged 58); Grönwohld, Germany
- Military career
- Allegiance: German Empire
- Branch: Imperial German Navy
- Service years: 1891–1918
- Rank: Kapitän zur See
- Unit: Nachrichten-Abteilung
- Commands: SMS Hela
- Conflicts: World War I
- Awards: Order of the Red Eagle; Order of the Crown of Prussia; Iron Cross, 1st and 2nd class

Karl Boy-Ed (14 September 1872 – 14 September 1930) was German career naval officer in the Imperial German Navy who served as the naval attaché at the Imperial German embassy in Washington, D.C. during World War I. Due to his involvement in spying and sabotage activities, he was expelled and returned to Germany. He died in a horse-riding accident at age 58.

== Family and early life ==
Of half Turkish and half German origin, Karl Boy-Ed was born in Lübeck on the German Baltic seacoast; he was the first of three children. His Turkish father, Carl Johann Boy, was a merchant in Lübeck. In 1878, Carl Johann Boy and his wife Ida Boy-Ed separated. Ida Ed (daughter of Christoph Marquard Ed, a member of the German parliament, publisher, and newspaper editor), moved to Berlin with her son Karl. She worked as a journalist and began writing novels. In 1880, Ida’s estranged husband forced her and Karl to return to Lübeck, as their divorce had not been finalized. She continued on her career as a writer and published a volume of seventy novels and essays. She supported the career of young Thomas Mann and corresponded with his brother Heinrich. As a major influence in the art and music scene in Lübeck, Ida supported the early careers of conductors Wilhelm Furtwängler and Hermann Abendroth. Thomas Mann regularly stayed overnight in the Boy-Ed household.

== Early naval career ==
Karl Boy-Ed joined the Imperial German Navy in 1891 at the age of nineteen. Rising through the ranks, he served on dozens of naval assignments. In 1898, Boy-Ed witnessed the American occupation of the Philippines. Shortly before the Boxer Rebellion, Kaiser Wilhelm's brother, Prince Heinrich von Preußen sent the navy Leutnant zur See (lieutenant) on a secret mission to assess the “value of the Chinese navy.” Boy-Ed considered his report as a major writing accomplishment. In view of the hostilities that broke out with China a year later, Boy-Ed’s "research" was timely. Between 1906 and 1909, Boy-Ed served on the staff of Grand Admiral Alfred von Tirpitz. In this period, Boy-Ed took over the Nachrichten-Abteilung (N – office of naval intelligence) from Paul von Hintze. Department "N" was the precursor of the German Naval Intelligence Service; it collected intelligence on naval affairs and disseminated German propaganda on her own navy. After three years in Berlin, Boy-Ed served as first officer on the SMS Deutschland and then commander of the naval tender SMS Hela. In 1911, promoted to Korvettenkapitän (lieutenant commander), he sailed on the SMS Preussen, the flagship of the second squadron.

== German naval attaché in the United States ==
In the beginning of 1912, his career took Boy-Ed to the United States as naval attaché under the German ambassador to the U.S., Johann Heinrich von Bernstorff. However, he traveled to Jamaica, the Panama Canal Zone and Mexico before he took over the office in Washington D.C. in 1913. He enjoyed popularity and respect among American naval officials before the war.

His area of responsibility also included Mexico, where the ambassadorship had just turned over to Paul von Hintze, Boy-Ed's former superior. As naval attaché, he was responsible for naval matters in North America, mainly intelligence gathering and supply of the German cruiser fleet. Well liked in the US, he regularly was invited to observe American and Canadian naval maneuvers and established a thorough social network. He worked closely with Franz von Papen, later the chancellor of Germany, who took over the post of military attaché in the United States and Mexico in 1914. Boy-Ed and Papen established an effective spy and sabotage ring during World War I, aimed at hindering the U.S. from sending aid to the Allies. Some of the more notorious members of this network were Franz von Rintelen, Felix A. Sommerfeld, Horst von der Goltz, and Paul Koenig. After several clandestine operations had been reported in American papers, Boy-Ed and Papen were declared persona non grata and expelled from the US in December 1915.

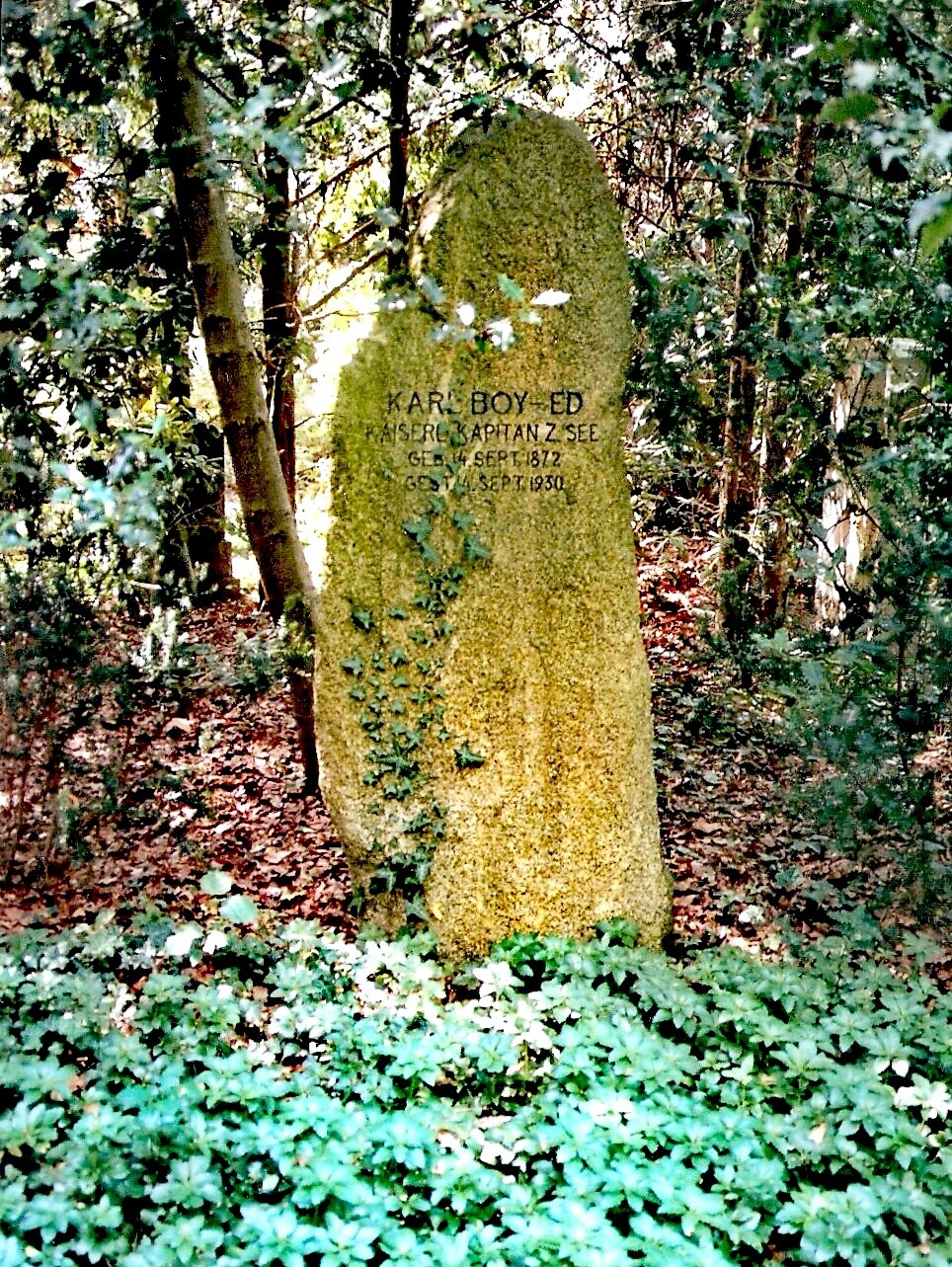
Boy-Ed's tombstone in Burgtorfriedhof, Lübeck

== Return to Germany and last years ==
Back in Germany, Boy-Ed was decorated by the Kaiser with the Order of the Red Eagle for his "services in America". He then returned to a post with the naval intelligence operation. However, he began to experience declining health. Boy-Ed suffered from phagomania, a constant desire to eat. The disorder required tremendous self-discipline in social circumstances. The other more severe disorder was insomnia. Boy-Ed could not sleep at night, which on the one hand increased his productivity but weighed heavily on his health. The stresses of his American assignment had taken a heavy toll on him physically and mentally. He admitted in his autobiographic sketch that as a result of his wartime assignment his nerves suffered a permanent "crack". He left the navy after the end of the war.

In February 1921, he married Virginia G. Mackay-Smith, daughter of Bishop Alexander Mackay-Smith of the Episcopal Diocese of Pennsylvania. After trying to move to the United States in 1926 but being denied a travel visa by the State Department, Boy-Ed settled in Hamburg, Germany.

Boy-Ed died after a horse-riding accident on his 58th birthday.

== Awards and decorations ==
- Order of the Red Eagle, 3rd class with bow and swords
- Order of the Red Eagle, 4th class with crown
- Order of the Crown of Prussia, 3rd class
- Iron Cross, 1st and 2nd class
- Knight 3rd class of the Order of Saint Michael
- Knight's Cross 1st class of the Albert Order
- Knight's Cross 1st class of the Friedrich Order
- Friedrich-August-Kreuz, 1st and 2nd class
- Hanseatic Cross of Lübeck

== Sources ==
- Boy-Ed, Karl. Peking und Umgebung. Tientsin: Verl. der Brigade-Zeitung, 1906. Rpt. Saarbrücken: Fines Mundi, 2012.
- ----------. Die Vereinigten Staaten von Amerika und der U-Boot-Krieg. Berlin: Karl Siegismund, 1918.
- ----------. Verschwörer? Berlin: August Scherl, 1920.
- Jones, Hollister. The German Secret Service in America, 1914 to 1918. Boston: Small, Maynard and Co., 1918.
- von Feilitzsch, Heribert. In Plain Sight: Felix A. Sommerfeld, Spymaster in Mexico, 1908 to 1914. Amissville [Virginia]: Henselstone Verl., 2012.
