= Hamburg Police Museum =

- Polizeimuseum Hamburg (German)
- Location: Carl-Cohn-Straße 39, 22297 Hamburg, Germany
- Coordinates: 53°36′11″N 10°00′22″E
- Website: www.polizeimuseum.hamburg

Hamburg Police Museum (Polizeimuseum Hamburg) is a museum based within the Hamburg Police Academy in the Hamburg-Winterhude district of Hamburg in northern Germany. It presents around 200 years of policing in the city, forensic methods and criminal cases from the early 20th century onwards. It is co-run by the Hamburger Polizeiverein. The museum is the largest police museum in Germany.

Part of the exhibition in the museum focuses on the National Socialist Period and reveals how the police played a defensive role in enforcing National Socialist tyranny.
