= Charlotte von Kalb =

German writer

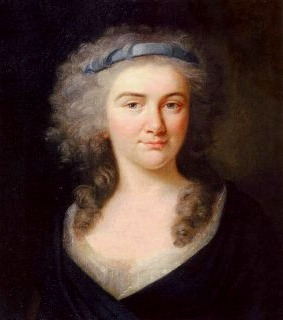
- Charlotte von Kalb by Johann Friedrich August Tischbein
- Born: 25 July 1761; Saal an der Saale, Electorate of Bavaria
- Died: 12 May 1843 (aged 81); Berlin, Kingdom of Prussia
- Spouse: Heinrich Julius Alexander von Kalb

Charlotte Sophia Juliana von Kalb (25 July 1761 – 12 May 1843) was a German writer who associated with poets Friedrich Schiller, Johann Wolfgang von Goethe, Friedrich Hölderlin and Jean Paul.

== Life ==
Charlotte Sophia Juliana, Baroness Marshal of Ostheim, was born in Saal an der Saale in 1761. She was characterized as neurotic in her youth.

== Personal life ==
She married Major Heinrich Julius Alexander von Kalb on 25 October 1783. He was a veteran of France's involvement with the American War of Independence.

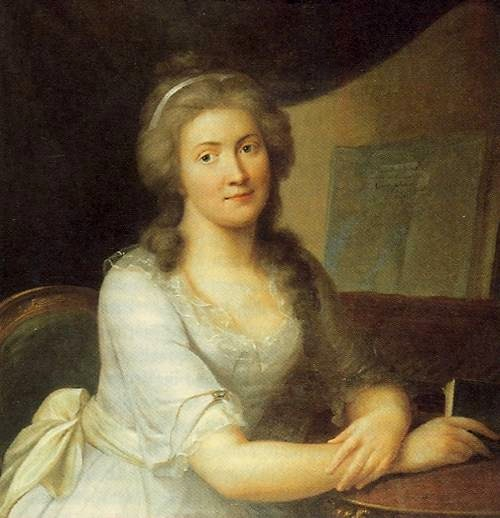
Charlotte von Kalb by Johann Heinrich Schmidt

Her marriage was an unhappy one as her husband was devoted to his career and they only spent their winters together. She employed Friedrich Hölderlin, then a young poet, as a tutor for her son. She was also associated with Johann Wolfgang von Goethe. Kalb was more than just a socialite and was said to have been asked to pass on Goethe's ideas about the development of animals' skulls to Professor Johann Herder. The idea was that skulls developed from vertebrae, an idea that is now discredited.

Friedrich Schiller had an affair with Kalb in the 1780s after they met in Mannheim in 1784. Schiller was two years older than she and they were together for a number of years; there was talk of Kalb divorcing and remarrying. Schiller is said to have based a number of his female characters on her. Eventually, Schiller convinced himself that they needed to separate, but he needed help from his family and friends to extricate himself. Schiller married in 1790.

In 1796, Charlotte von Kalb began a correspondence with another German Romantic writer, Jean Paul. The primary interest was intellectual, but Jean Paul was flattered and arranged to travel to Weimar to meet her in person. Even then, their letters were initially cool, although Jean Paul was said to be "magnetic", and he admired not only Kalb's eyes but also "her soul". Her letters to Jean Paul were later published, containing their entreaties of love. Jean Paul was in two minds but he decided that she was "too titanic, too heroic". They did not marry, as Jean Paul might have indicated he hoped.

In 1800, Kalb informally separated from her husband. His military career had ended, and his financial position was poor. In April 1806 he shot himself in Munich and died.

Kalb died in Berlin in 1843, having published no books in her lifetime. In 1851, some years after her death, her book Cornelia was published, and in 1879, over thirty years after her death, an incomplete autobiography appeared titled Charlotte. During her lifetime, Kalb was judged unfavourably by other women, but she "fascinated nearly all the men she ever knew".
