= Bremen Police =

State police force of Bremen, Germany

Bremen Police Polizei Bremen

Agency overview
- Formed: January 1, 1947
- Employees: 2,550

Jurisdictional structure
- Operations jurisdiction: Bremen
- Location of Bremen shown in Germany
- Area: 419.38 km^{2}
- Governing body: Senate of Bremen
- Constituting instrument: Polizeigesetz (PolG)
- General nature: Civilian police

Operational structure
- Headquarters: Bremen
- Agency executive: Dirk Fasse, Polizeipräsident

Website
- Polizei Bremen

The Bremen State Police (German: Polizei Bremen) is the state police force of the Free Hanseatic City of Bremen. It employs around 2,500 officers. The agency is headed by police chief (German: Polizeipräsident) Dirk Fasse; the political head is the Senator for the Interior Ulrich Mäurer.

The Bremen Police consists of three main bureaus: the central police directorate for personnel, education and logistics (Zentrale Polizeidirektion); the bureau of operations (Direktion Einsatz), comprising three patrol divisions Schutzpolizei, the riot police division readiness police, the traffic police division, and the water police division; and the detectives bureau (Direktion Kriminalpolizei/Landeskriminalamt).

== History ==
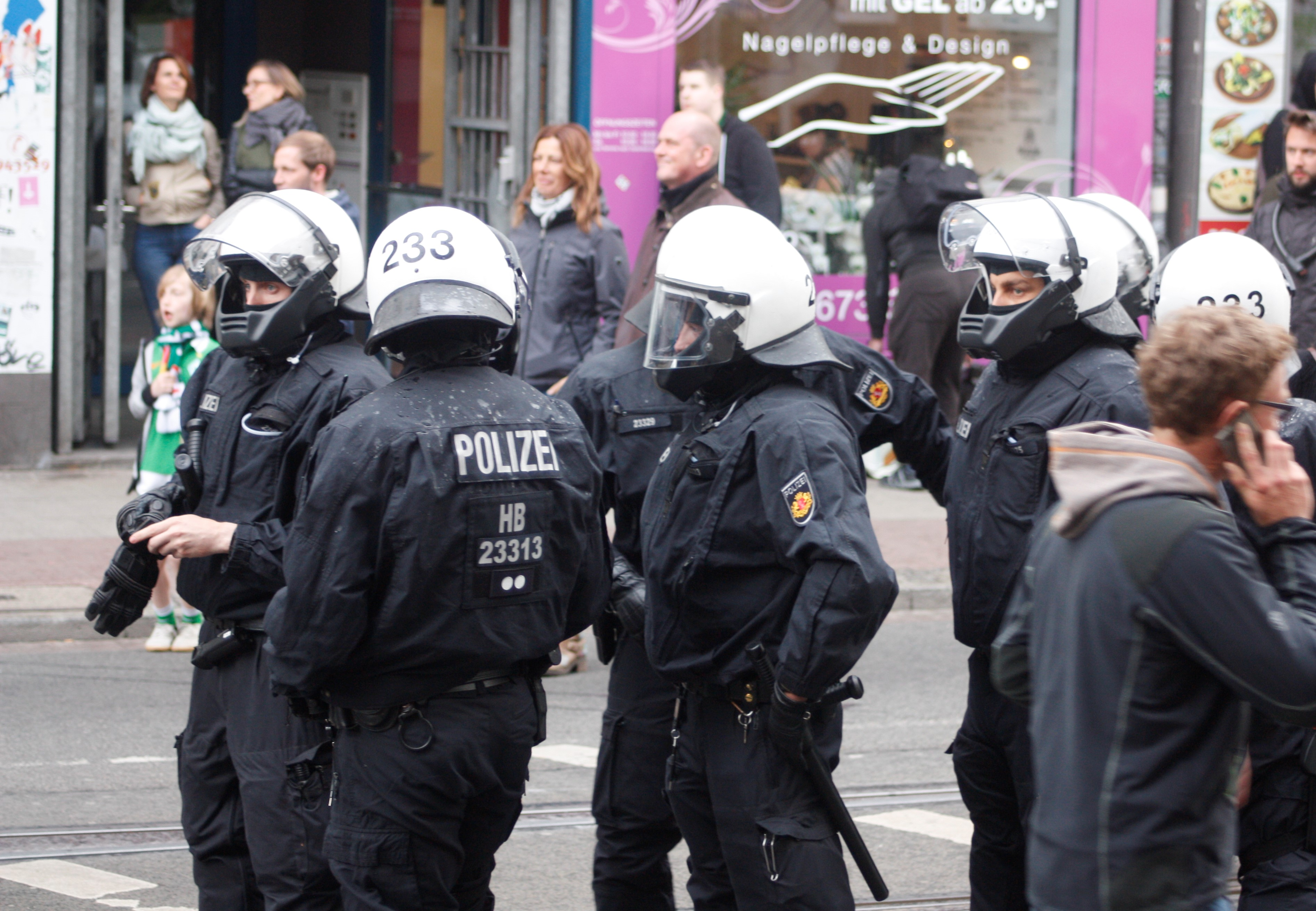
Bereitschaftspolizei Bremen regrouping following a Werder Bremen match, 2015

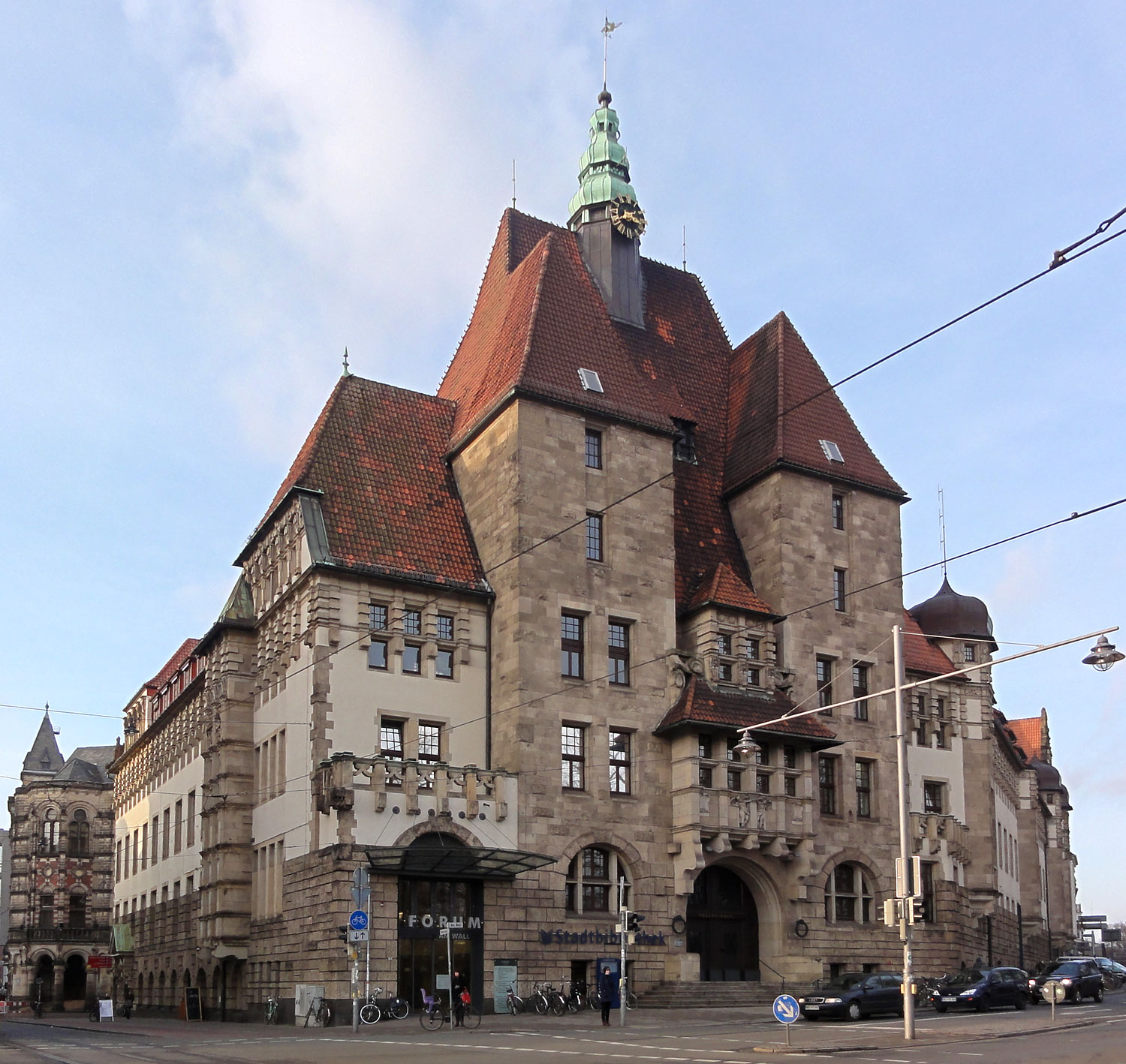
Polizeihaus, Bremen

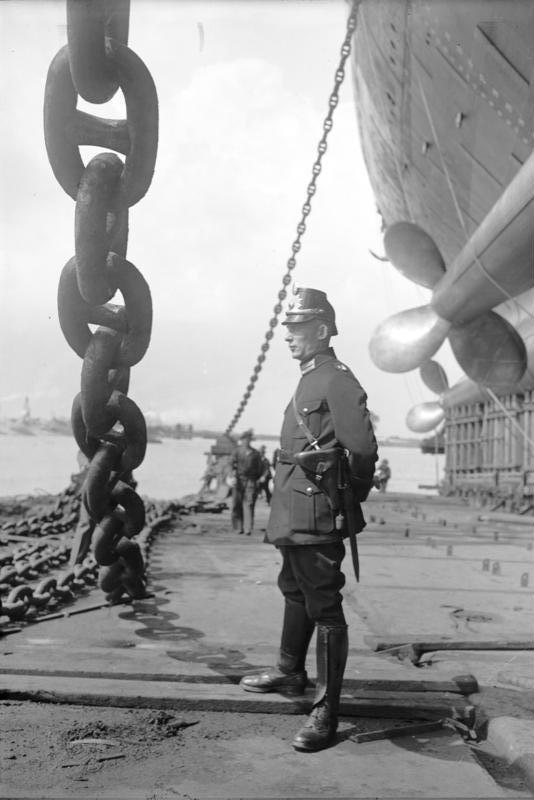
Bremen Police officer standing by an anchor cable at the launching of SS Bremen, 1928

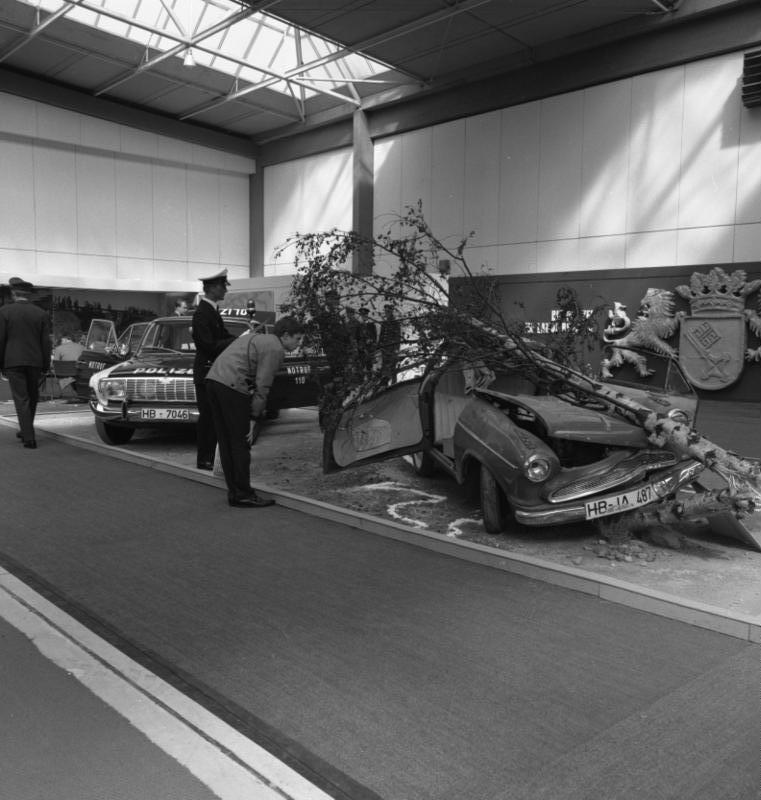
International Police Exhibition Hannover 1966: A traffic accident presented by Bremen police

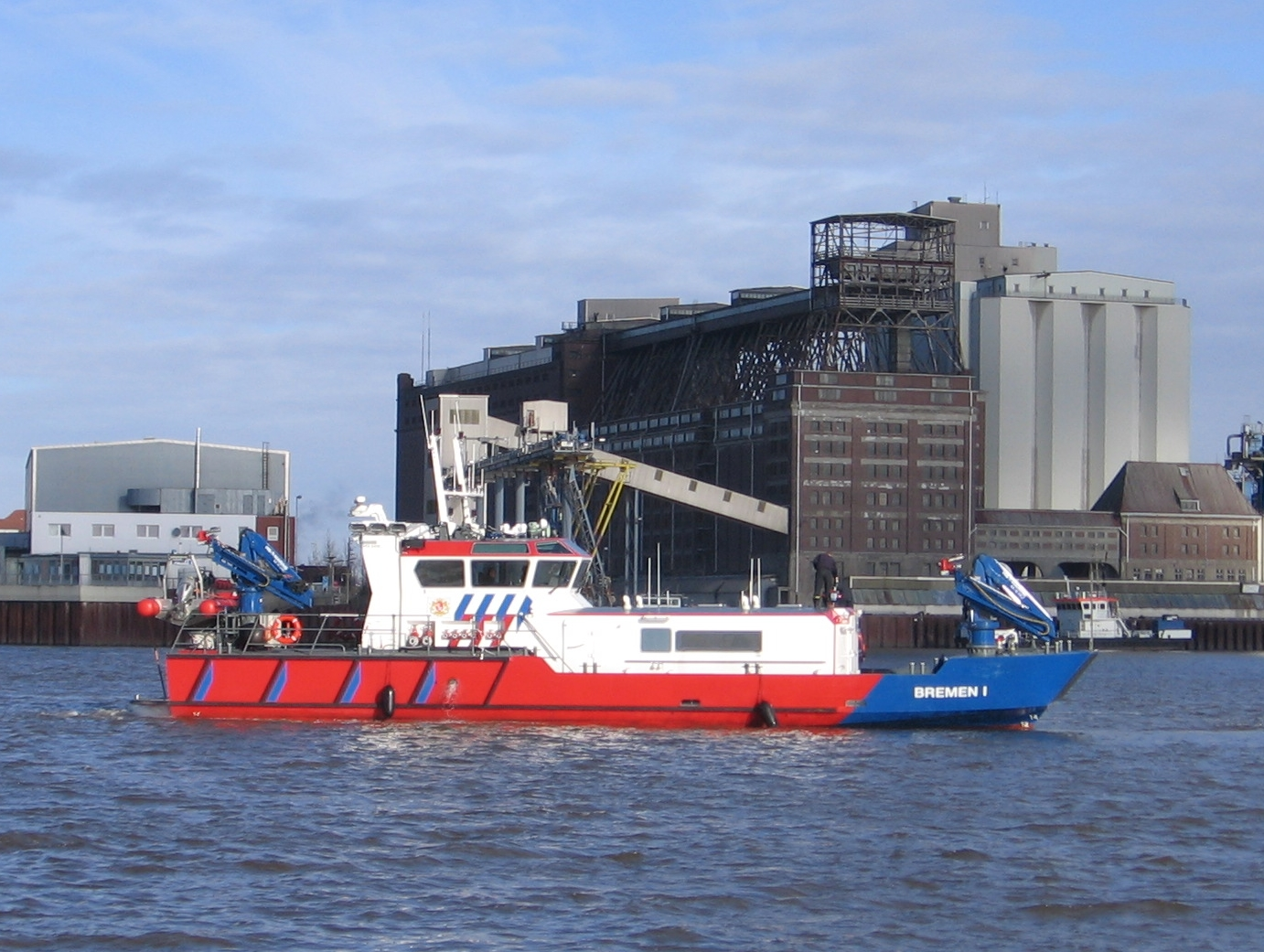
Readiness boat "Bremen 1" for Wasserschutzpolizei and Bremen fire brigade

The Bremen Police was under the command of a police-commission of the Senat of Bremen headed by after major Karl Deichmann (MSPD) (1919–1920), after World War I. Later policing was headed by Senator Albert von Spreckelsen (DVP) (1920–1928, 1931–1933) and Senator Deichmann (1928–1931) again. From 1919, the office of a president of the police was installed and until 1933, the conservative Leopold Petri held this position.

In Nazi Germany, policing in Bremen was headed by SS or NSDAP members, but the commander of police was still the mayor of Bremen. The police consisted of a small Schutzpolizei (regular police), a large number of so-called "Luftschutzpolizei" (Air Raid Precautions police), a city corps and about 700 plant protection police officers.

The Bremen Police was reformed after World War II as the law enforcement agency for the state of Bremen. In 1947, a state criminal investigation office (Landeskriminalamt, LKA) was founded, which closely worked alongside the police from the British element of the Control Commission for Germany and later with the related office in Lower Saxony. In 1974, the Landeskriminalamt was made an independent agency and in 2000, it was once again made part of the state police's criminal investigation office.

On May 6, 1980, a ceremonial oath of the Bundeswehr for recruits took place in Bremen Weserstadion. It was the first vow taken since the Bundeswehr was founded and was a major public event outside the barracks. Protests against the oath-taking ceremony turned violent, culminating in the biggest riot in the history of the city of Bremen. 257 police officers and more than 500 protestors were injured.

In 2014, the political head of Bremen State Police Ulrich Mäurer (SPD) started an initiative to charge the German Football Association (DFB) for the additional costs of large police presences at so-called "high-risk-matches" (Hochriskospiele), which was then paid by tax proceedings. Deutsche Fußball-Liga (DFL) denied this and the initiative went to court. In 2019, the Bundeverwaltungsgericht ruled it was legal to charge DFL for additional costs.

The traditional police headquarters is the Polizeihaus Am Wall in the city centre, which had housed the Bremen police from 1908 until 1999. Today, the inner-city police office is housed there whilst the police headquarters is now in Bremen-Vahr. The riot police and the police academy are based in the Hindenburg-barracks in Bremen-Neustadt.

== Organization ==
The Bremen State Police consists of three main divisions; the central police directorate for personnel, education and logistics (Zentrale Polizeidirektion); the operational directorate for traffic and water police, Schutzpolizei, the readiness police (Direktion Einsatz) and criminal investigation unit (Direktion Kriminalpolizei/Landeskriminalamt). Part of Bereitschaftspolizei Bremen is a Police dog unit (Hundestaffel Bremen). The weaponry bomb disposal unit (Kampfmittelräumdienst Bremen) is also a division of Bremen Police.

The State Police also cooperates with federal agencies: at the airport and the main station of Bremen with federal police and in custom related cases with the local Hauptzollamt Bremen and Zollfahndungsamt Hamburg.

Police officers are organized in both police unions, Deutsche Polizeigwerkschaft (DPolG) and Gewerkschaft der Polizei (GdP).

=== Training ===
Officers at Bremen Police are trained by a three-year course in policing at the Hochschule für Öffentliche Verwaltung Bremen, graduating with a Bachelor of Art. At the basic study the officers are trained in knowledge about society science, traffic-science and transport-law, psychology, law, administration and tactics, criminalistic and policing, as well as learning a foreign language. During the course, sport, shooting and self-defence are integrated in the education at a regular base, as well as practical training in police duties.

The Bremen Police run a mock police station education at the police academy. There novices train tactical behaviour and operational skills in practical scenarios.

Officers of Naval police have to have maritime additional qualification, trained by the Wasserschutzpolizeischule in Hamburg.

=== Naval division ===
The Bremen Police operate a naval division - the Wasserschutzpolizei Bremen ("Water Police Force"), WSP. Wasserschutzpolizei Bremen is part of Direktion Einsatz and is responsible for the naval police enforcement on the river Weser. Local offices are located in the port of Doventor and the Bremerhaven container terminal. The tasks of the WSP include operational and patrol duties, crime prevention, dangerous goods transport monitoring, environmental protection, maritime safety and contact service in recreational shipping. Until 2011, WSP Bremen was also responsible for the police control of international traffic in the seaports of Bremen and Bremerhaven until those responsibilities were handed over to the Federal Police by order of federal police leadership.

=== Equipment ===
The Bremen police is equipped with variety of patrol vehicles. The Bereitschaftspolizei use Mercedes Benz vans and operates two Wasserwerfer 10000 water cannons. Officers carry Walther P99 firearms as well as additional tools equipment such as handcuffs, pepperspray, a flashlight and a tonfa.

Heckler & Koch MP5 submachine guns and G36 assault rifles are additionally used by Bremen's SEK units. The state's SEK unit is often deployed in counter-terrorism operations and operations against organized crime.
