= Landespolizei =

German state police

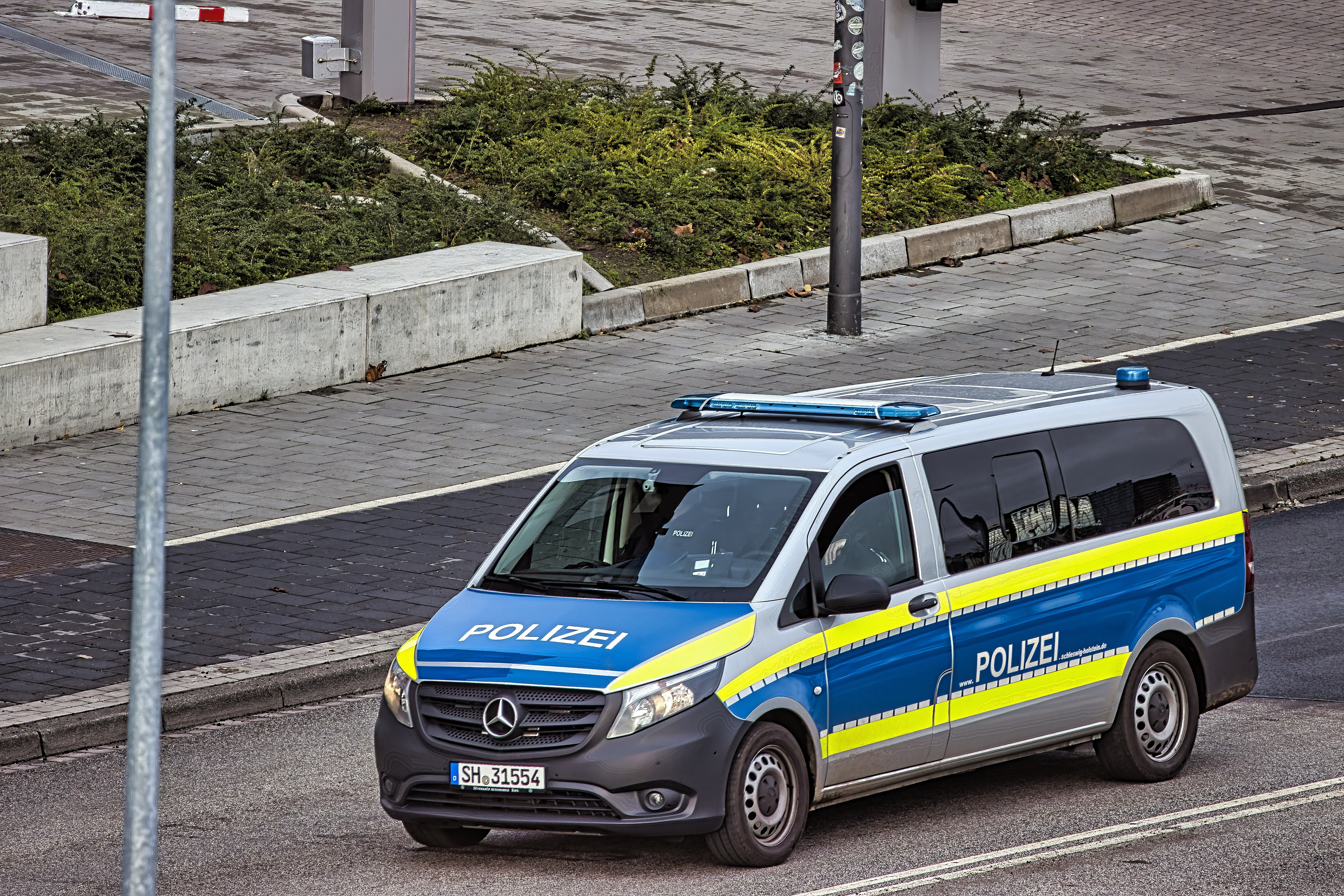
Schleswig-Holstein Police patrol car

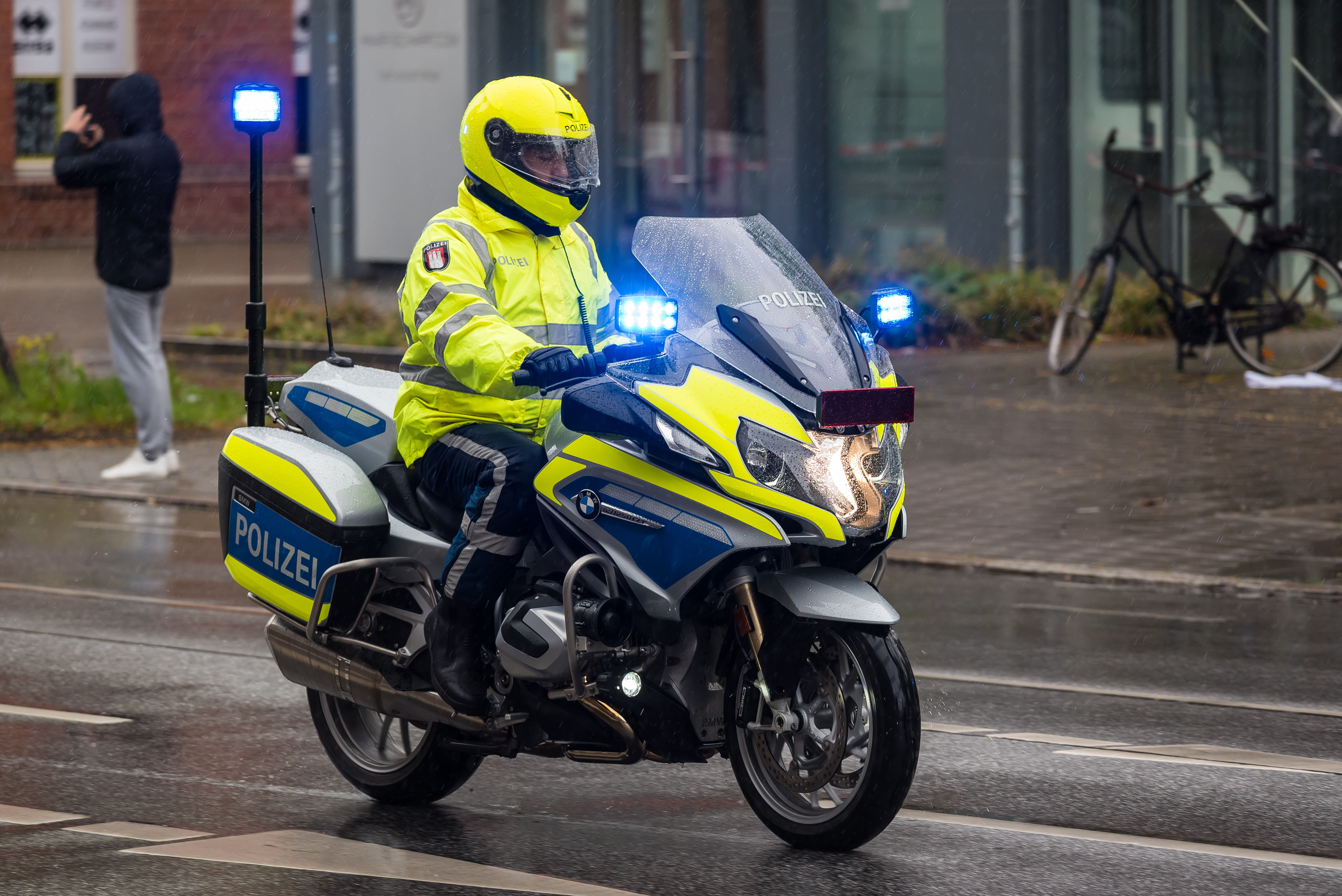
Hamburg Police motorcycle

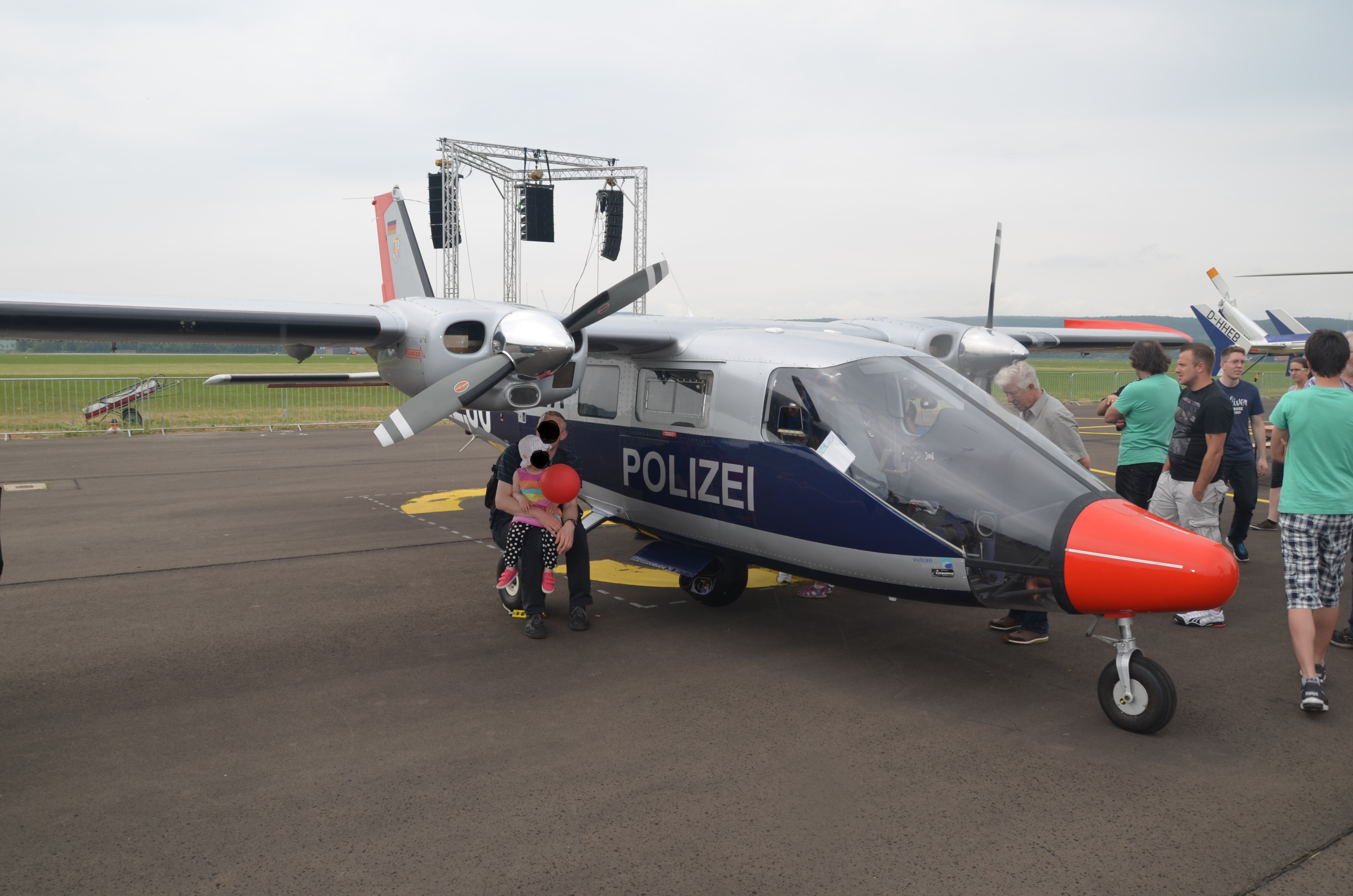
Vulcanair P68 Observer of the Hesse State Police

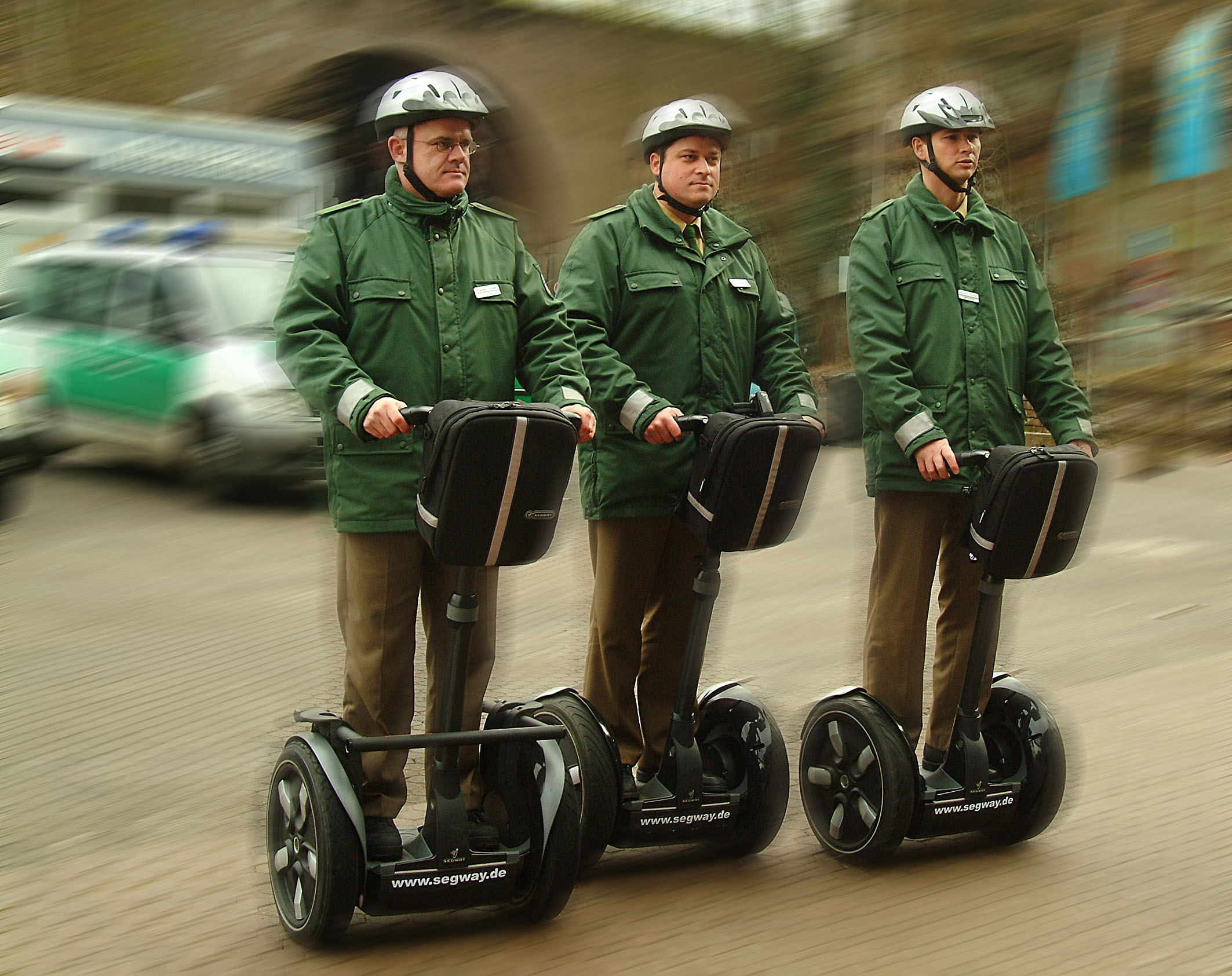
Segway personal transporters tested by the Saarland Police in the summer of 2006

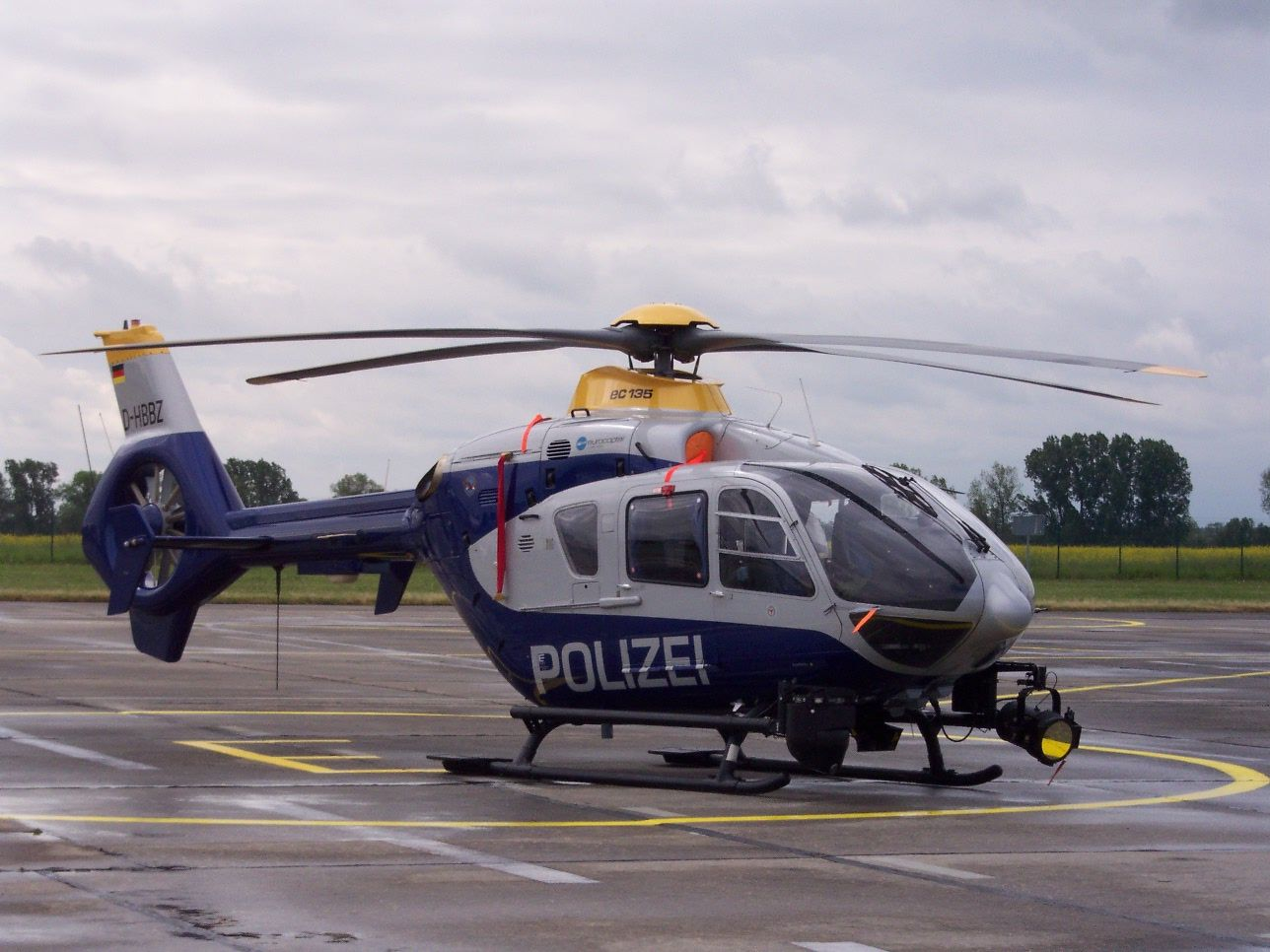
Eurocopter EC 135 police helicopter of the Brandenburg State Police

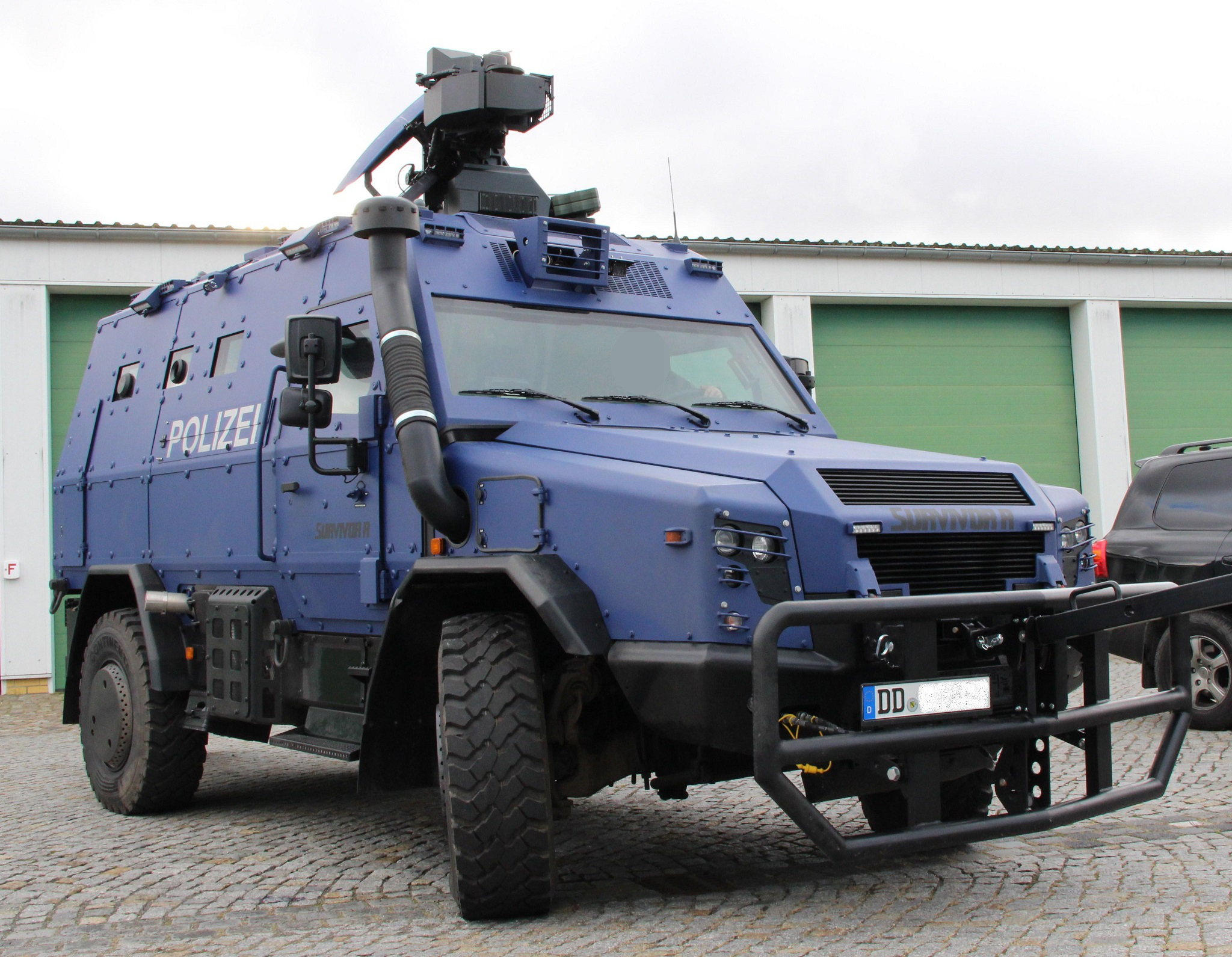
The RMMV Survivor R of the police of Saxony is a tactical, armored vehicle, specialised for anti-terror tasks.

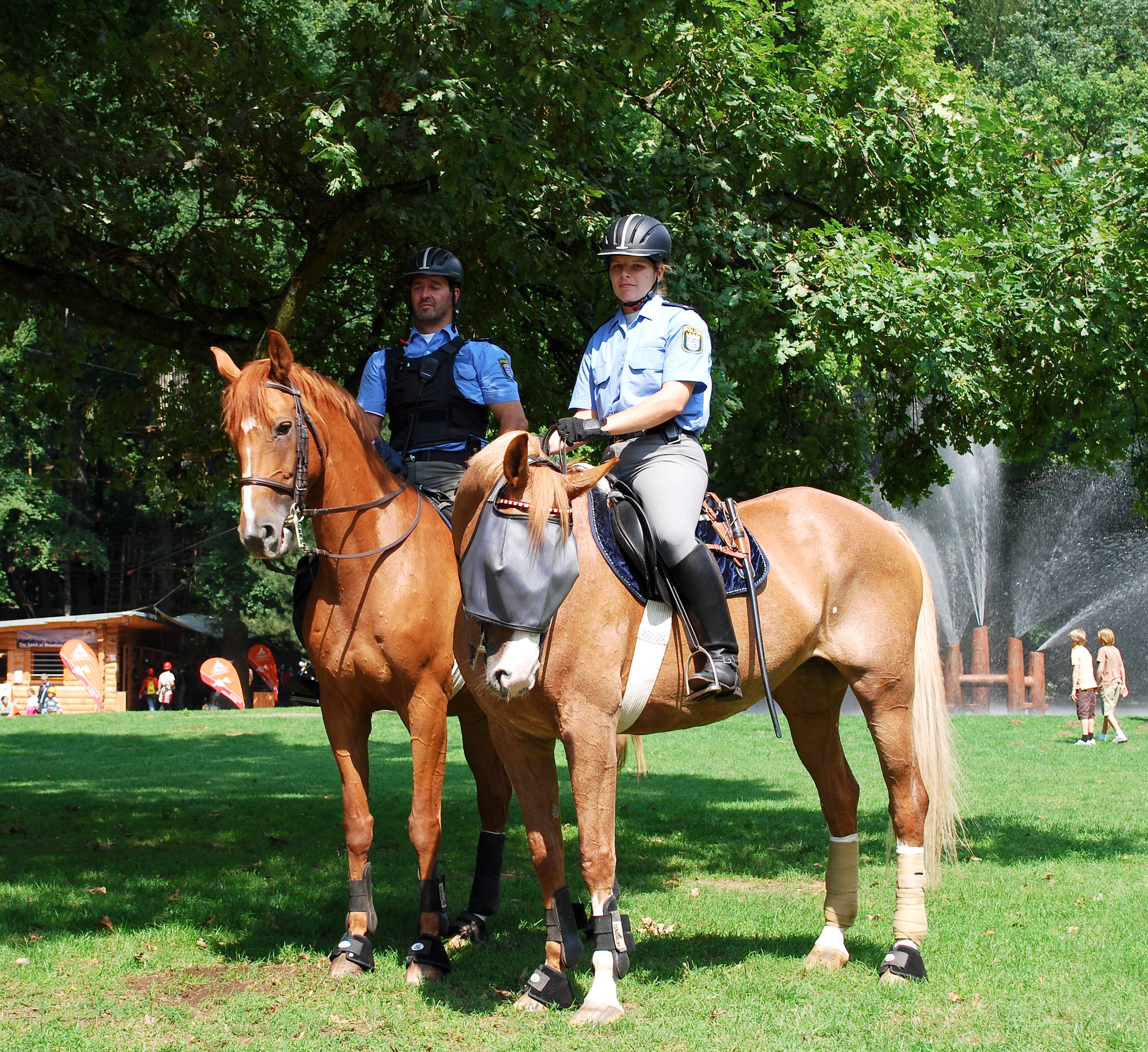
Mounted State Police officers in Offenbach, Hesse

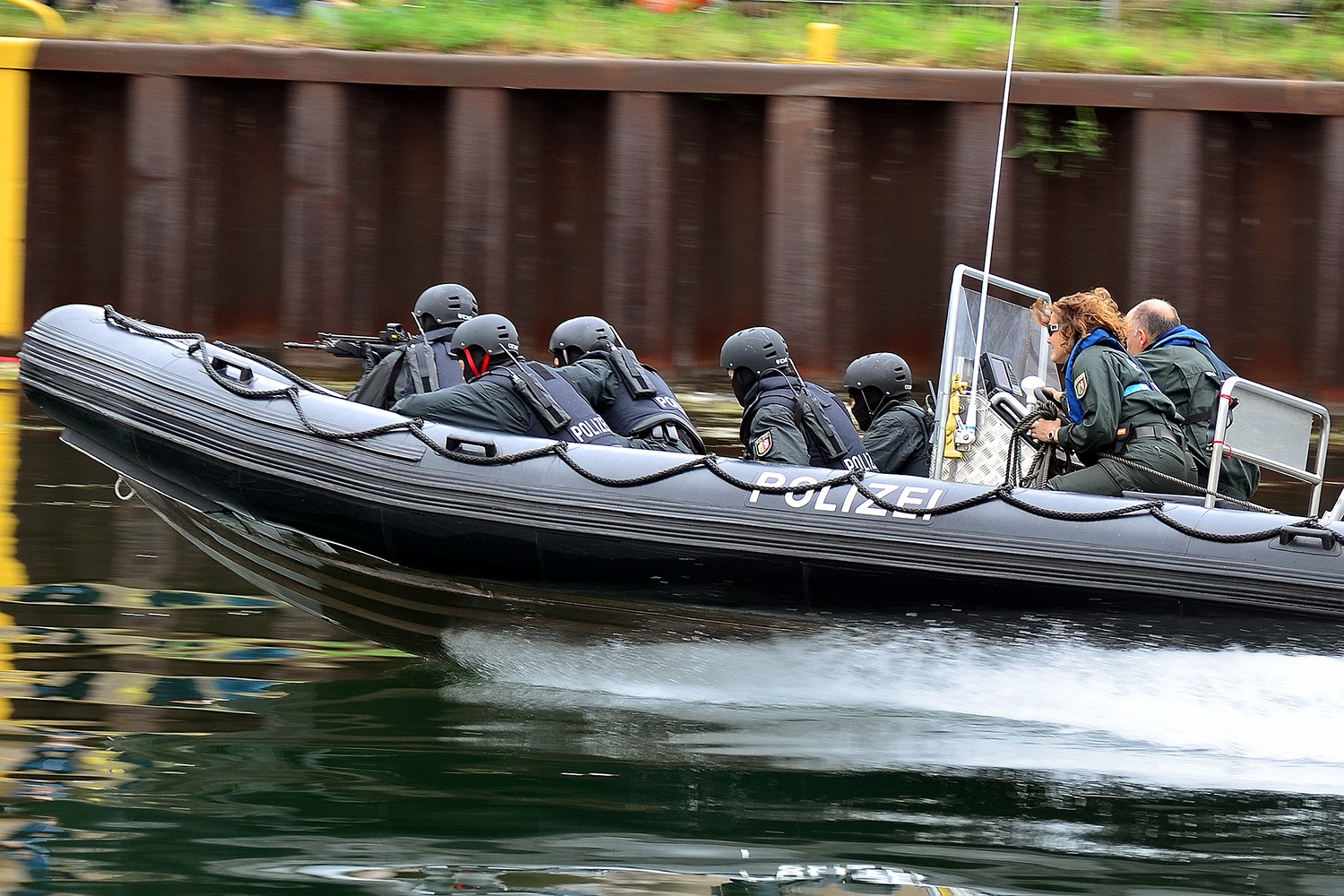
SEK members of North Rhine-Westphalia during an exercise

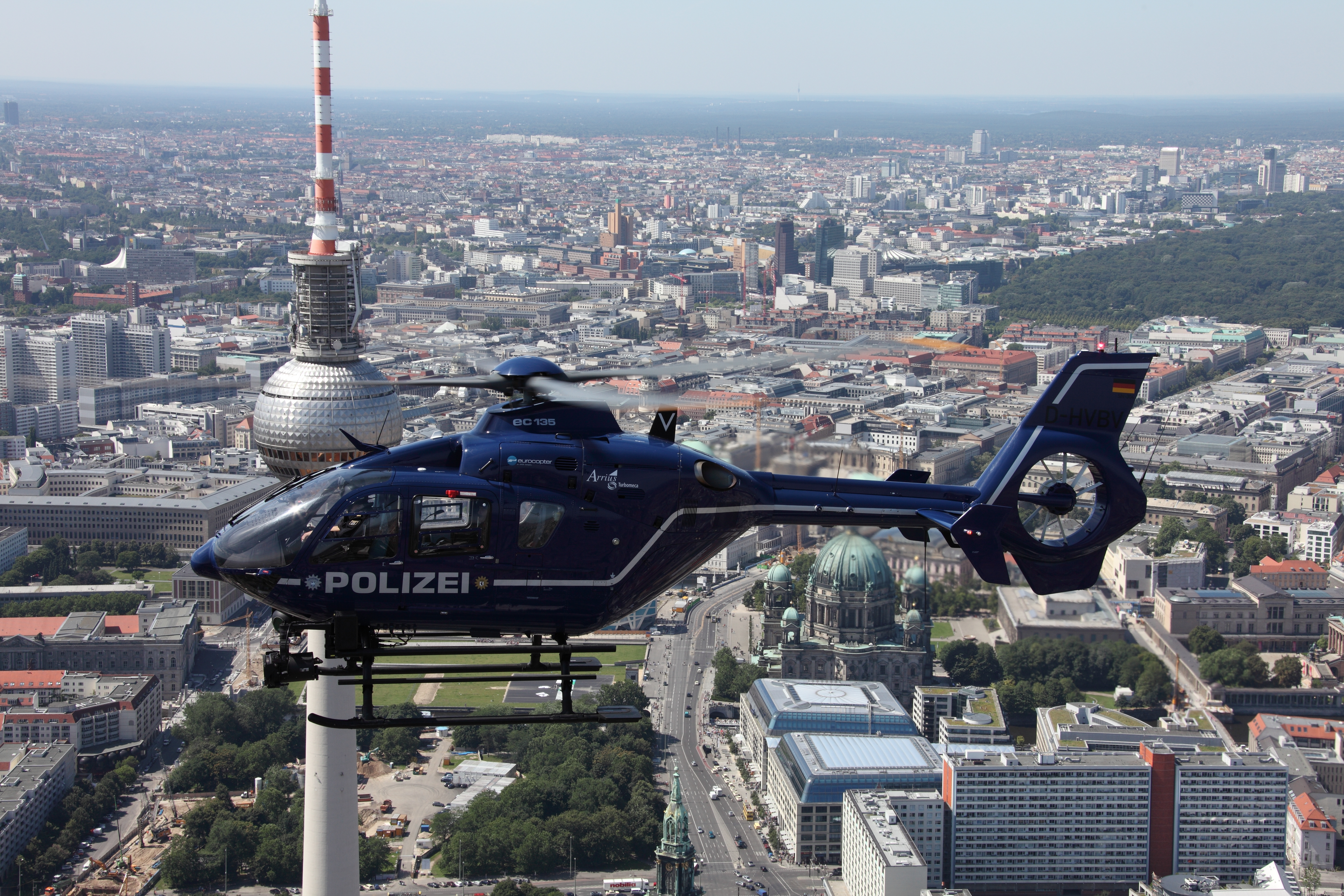
A helicopter of the Berlin Police over Berlin

Landespolizei (German for 'state police'; German pronunciation: [ˌlandəspoliˈt͡saɪ]) is a term used to refer to the state police of any of the states of Germany.

== History ==
The Landespolizei of today can trace its origins to the late 19th century, when Germany united into a single country in 1871, under Otto von Bismarck. Various towns and cities also maintained police forces, as the increasing number of new laws and regulations made controlling urban life more complicated.

In Nazi Germany, all state and city forces were absorbed into the Ordnungspolizei, which existed from 1936 to 1945.

After World War II, massive numbers of refugees and displaced persons, hunger and poverty characterised everyday life in Germany. Attacks by armed gangs, robbery, looting and black-marketing were commonplace, and the military police could not cope with this troubling security situation. Thus each of the Western Allies quickly permitted the formation of civilian police forces, including small numbers of heavily armed and military like organised police forces in Western Germany, under terms that reflected their own police structures and traditions.

In all three Western zones, the emphasis was to decentralise, demilitarise and democratise the police. Some restrictions were lifted as Cold War tensions grew. In addition, the botched hostage rescue attempt at Munich Olympic Massacre, as well as rise in organized crime and terrorism (Red Army Faction, Revolutionary Cells) proved that certain police functions necessitated central rather than local direction, thus the western state police forces underwent significant reforms in the 1970s. Most notably, the municipal police forces become part of the Landespolizei, such as the Munich city police, which became Polizeipräsidium München as part of Bavarian State Police in 1975. The Landespolizei became the police force for the federal states in the West.

East Germany created a unified national force in the form of the Volkspolizei, however this was reorganized according to the West German police upon the reunification of Germany in 1990.

== Organisation ==
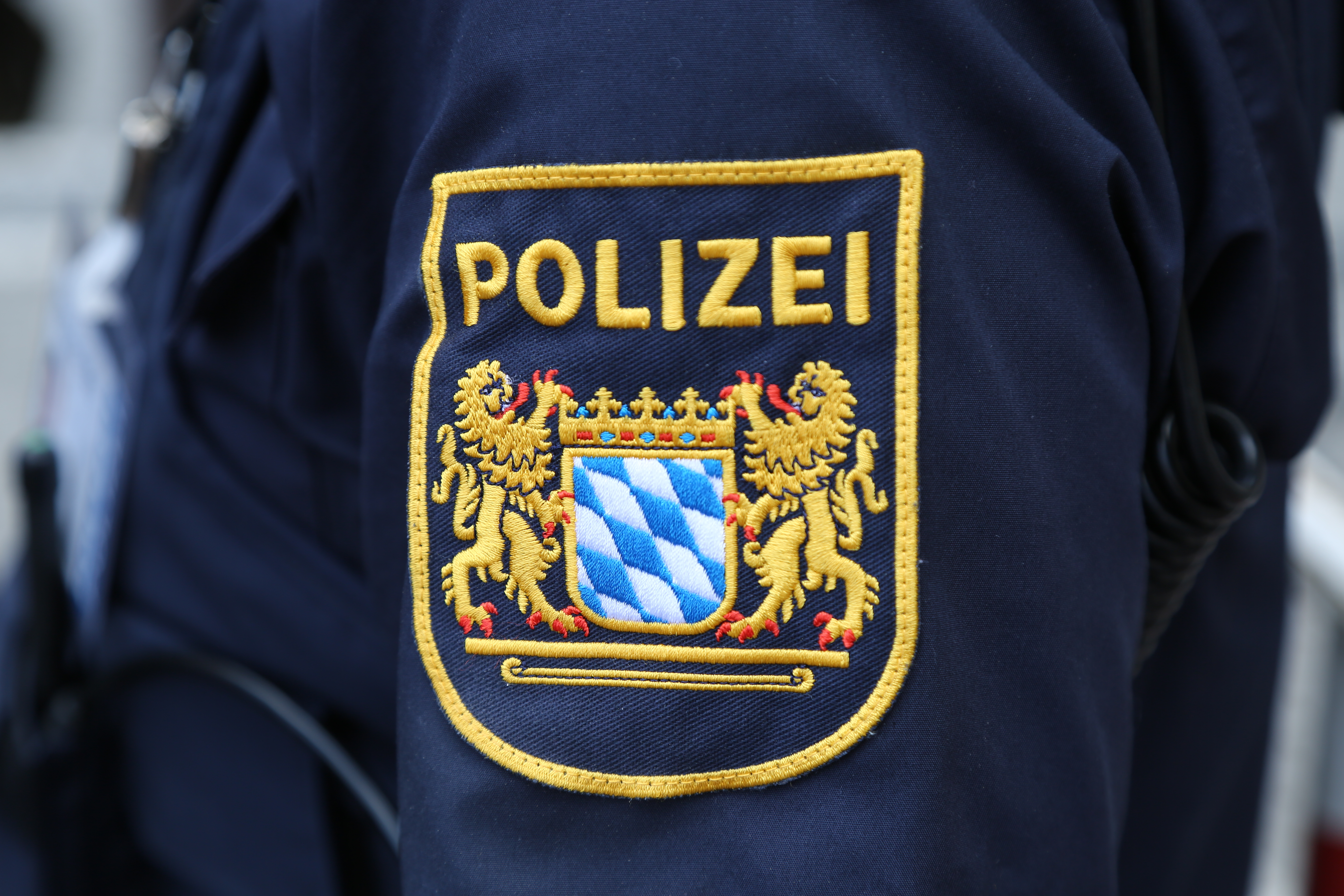
The uniform patch of the Bavarian Police Force

All state police forces in the Federal Republic of Germany are subordinate to their respective Land (State) Minister of the Interior. The internal structures of these police forces differ somewhat (which makes generalizations subject to local variations), but in most cases, immediately subordinate to the interior ministries are the regional police headquarters (Präsidium). These headquarters direct operations over a wide area or in a big city, and have administrative and supervisory functions. The Präsidium often has direct control of the force's specialist units, such as highway patrols, mounted police detachments and canine units.

Under the regional headquarters, there are several district police headquarters (Direktionen) serving communities of from 200,000 to 600,000 citizens. Subordinate to each Direktion, there are several local stations (Inspektion) or precincts (Revier) that are staffed on a 24-hour basis, conduct day-to-day policing and serve as points of contact for local citizens. Below this level, the Polizeiposten are small police offices staffed by one or two officers, normally only during office hours.

=== Territorial ===
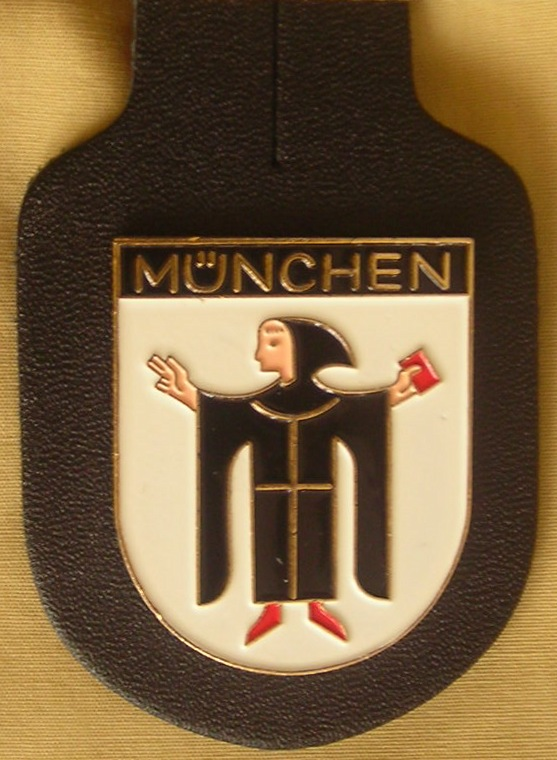
Pocket badge of the Munich city police force

The State Police wear the state patch on the uniform sleeve and sometimes metal city badges are worn over the right breast pocket, indicating which police department they work for. Police officers can be transferred anywhere within their state.

Once skilled, officers of the state police can be moved theoretically nationwide. In practice, such requests are made by the officers themselves. They usually swap workplaces with an exchange partner from another federal state ('Stellentausch', job rotation). Such an exchange is thus possible nationwide and is not dependent on the state.

=== Operational ===
State police forces are divided into the following branches:

- Schutzpolizei ("Schupo") - the uniformed police officers who patrol the streets and respond to emergency calls etc.
- Bereitschaftspolizei (BePo) - Uniformed units of the LaPo or Federal Police that provide additional manpower for the Schupo in cases of natural disasters, sporting events, traffic control or demonstrations. In 1950 the Bepo was founded as a paramilitary police force whose main task today is riot/crowd control.

In some states the police academy is still part of the Bepo. After qualifying as a police officer, officers have to serve one to two years with the Bepo before moving on to law enforcement duties at a police station.

- Verkehrspolizei - The traffic police in Germany.
- Autobahnpolizei - The highway patrol in Germany. In some states the Autobahnpolizei is a sub division of the Verkehrspolizei department.
- Wasserschutzpolizei (WSP) - The river police for patrolling rivers, lakes and harbours. For practical reasons the WSP of one state may be in charge for territory of another state (e.g., in Hamburg, the WSP is in charge for the Elbe River in the states of Mecklenburg-Vorpommern, Lower Saxony, Schleswig-Holstein and Hamburg.)
- Wachpolizei ("Wapo") - Officers protecting buildings, embassies or pretrial suspects.
- Kriminalpolizei ("Kripo") - the detective branch, responsible for most investigations. For instance, if a car is broken into, the Schupo will respond, secure the car, notify the owner etc., and then hand the case over to Kripo for investigation.
- Landeskriminalamt (LKA) - State Investigation Bureau supervises police operations aimed at preventing and investigating criminal offences, and coordinates investigations involving more than one Präsidium. Some crimes are exclusive LKA missions such as crimes against the constitution, organized crime, youth gangs or political motivated crime.

Dedicated to the LKA:

- Spezialeinsatzkommando (SEK) - The police tactical units of the German state police.
- Mobiles Einsatzkommando (MEK) - The MEKs are plainclothes teams of the LKA with specialised observation and arrest duties.
- Personenschutzkommando - Personal security plainclothes unit, protecting politicians and VIPs.

== Training ==
The individual Länder and the Federal Police conduct basic police training for their personnel. The length and thoroughness of this training contributes in large degree to the high level of police professionalism in Germany. Teaching all aspects of police work takes time but supports a "uniform career structure" that aims to avoid premature specialization, lets officers think in broad terms, makes career field changes easier and improves promotion opportunities.

German citizenship is not required to be a police officer in Germany. Police departments in big cities are especially keen to recruit officers from ethnic minorities to reduce language and cultural barriers. However, minorities still make up less than one percent of officer numbers.

The Land police have had women members since the forces were reconstituted after World War II. Initially, female officers were only assigned to cases involving juveniles and women but in the mid-1970s they were allowed to become patrol officers. The proportion of women on patrol duty is set to rise as 40-50 percent of police school inductees are currently female.

Most police recruits are taken on directly after leaving school and spend about two and a half years at police school in combined classroom tuition and on-the-job training with police departments and the Bereitschaftspolizei. These people qualify as regular police officers and wear light blue stars on their shoulder straps, denoting rank in the first echelon of the police service.

After duty as a patrol officer, someone with an outstanding record or wealth of experience can go on to two or three years at a higher police school or college of public administration to qualify for the upper echelon which starts with Polizeikommissar (one silver star) and ascends to Erster Polizeihauptkommissar (five silver stars). Direct entry candidates with the Abitur high school diploma can also take these courses. Some states such as Hessen now train all their police officers for the upper echelon to improve pay and promotion chances.

The very few candidates who qualify for the police service's executive ranks study for one year at a state police academy and then for another at the German Police University (Deutsche Hochschule der Polizei – DHPol) in Münster-Hiltrup where graduates earn a master's degree in police administration. Direct-entry candidates with a university degree only study for six months at the DHPol. The executive echelon begins with Polizeirat (one gold star) and culminates with the Land chief of uniformed police (gold wreath with one to three stars) or Federal Police chief (gold wreath with four stars). The DHPol that the states and Federal Interior Ministry administer jointly also provides specialized vocational courses for senior police personnel.

== Sidearm ==
All Landespolizei officers carry handguns while on duty. Each German state's Landespolizei differ from other states in what sidearm they carry; this list includes some of the weapons utilized by various Landespolizei, as well as weapons that have been phased out:

Model	Origin	Status	Users	Reference
Walther P38	Nazi Germany	Retired	Post-WWII officers	
Walther PP	Weimar Republic	Retired	Post-WWII officers	
Walther P5	West Germany	Retired	Baden-Württemberg Police and Rhineland-Palatinate Police	
Heckler & Koch P7	West Germany	Retired	Bavarian State Police and Lower Saxony State Police	
Heckler & Koch P9	West Germany	Retired	Saarland Police	
SIG Sauer P6	West Germany	Retired	Formerly adopted by most forces, including Hesse State Police, Bremen Police, Berlin Police, Saxon Police Force and Mecklenburg-Vorpommern forces	
SIG Sauer P228	West Germany	Retired	Brandenburg State Police	
Makarov	East Germany	Retired	Kept by Saxony-Anhalt forces in the initial post-reunification times during lack of funds	
HK P2000	Germany	Current	Baden-Württemberg Police; formerly in use by Hamburg Police and Lower Saxony State Police	
Walther P99Q	Germany	Current	North Rhine-Westphalia Police, Bremen Police, Hamburg Police, Schleswig-Holstein Police and Rhineland-Palatinate Police	
Heckler & Koch P10	Germany	Current	Thuringia State Police; formerly in use by Saxon Police Force and Saarland Police	
Heckler & Koch P30	Germany	Current	Hesse State Police	
Heckler & Koch VP9	Germany	Current	Bavarian State Police, Berlin Police, Brandenburg State Police, Lower Saxony State Police, Mecklenburg-Vorpommern State Police and Saarland Police	
Glock 46	Austria	Current	Saxony-Anhalt State Police	

== Appearance ==
Historic green uniform jacket of the Hesse State Police

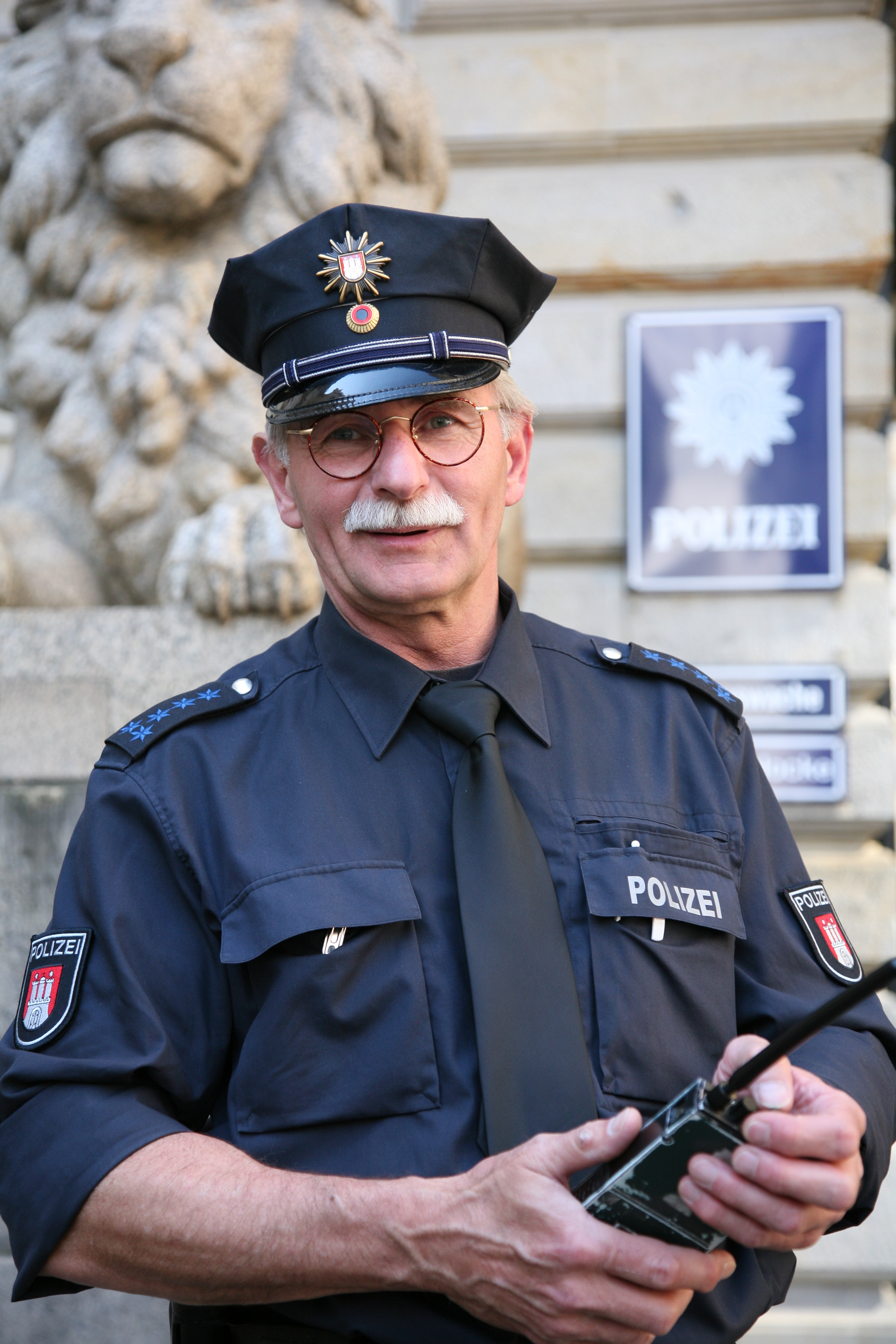
Hamburg uniform type

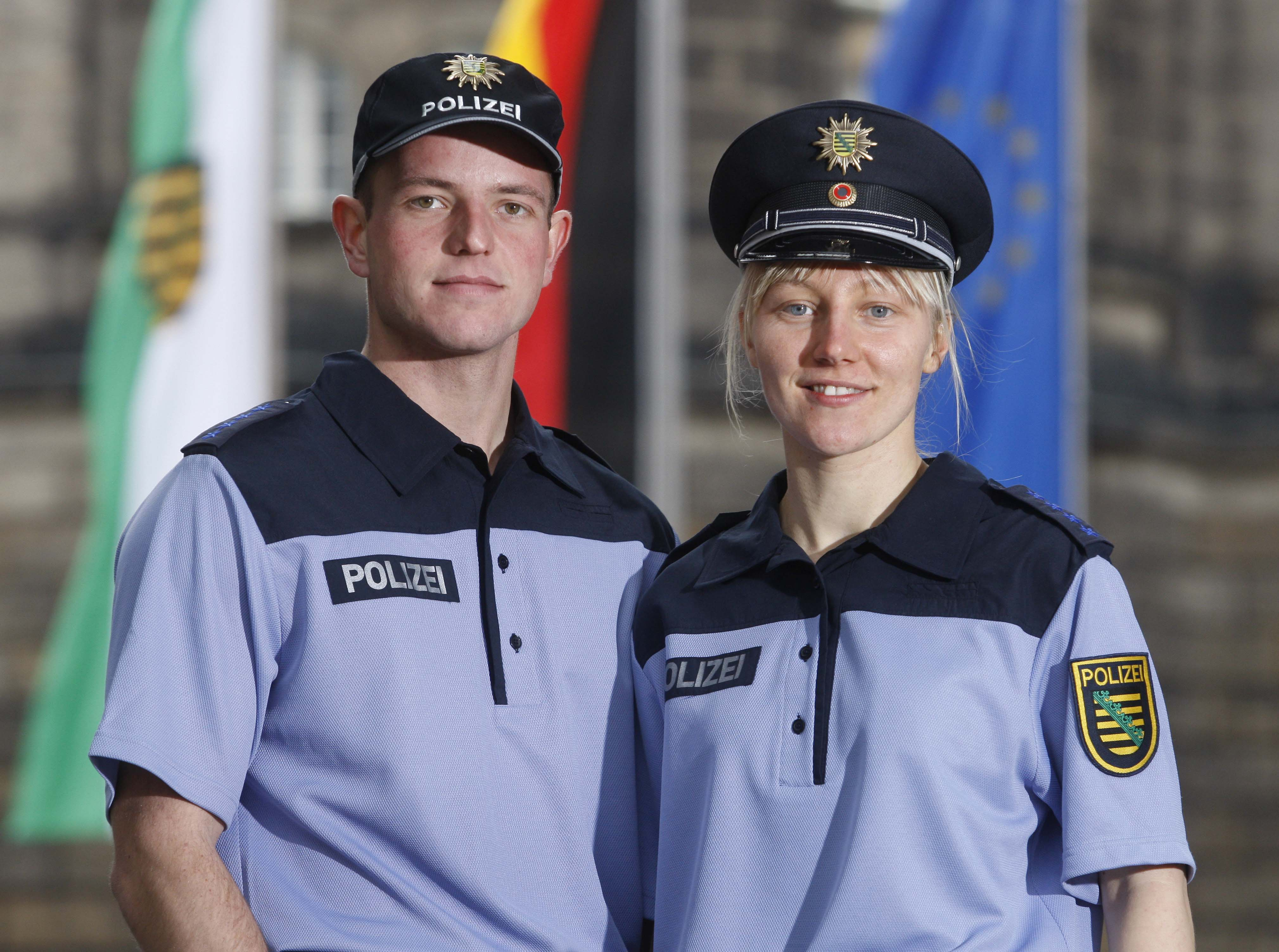
Saxon uniform type

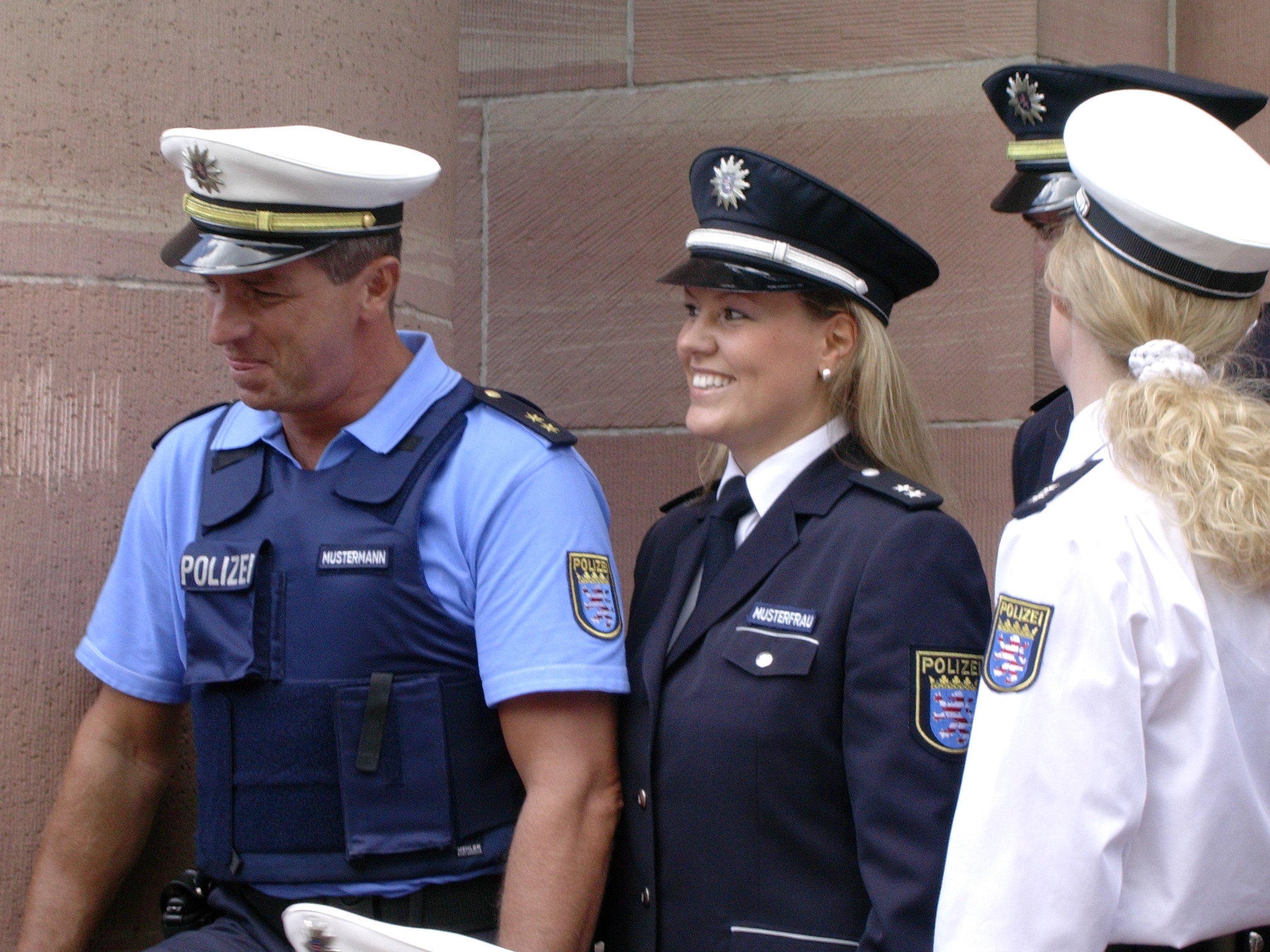
Hesse uniform type

=== Post WWII ===
From 1945 till 1976, the various Länder had a wide array of insignia and rank. Additionally, uniforms colours varied from green to blue, and various shades thereof. For example, the City State of Hamburg police NCOs wore blue uniforms with inverted British style chevrons and the Schleswig Holstein police wore green uniforms with Third Reich style rank. Bavaria maintained a State Police (Landespolizei) as well as City Police (Gemeinde / Stadt) forces and, as a special feature, an own Border Police (Bayerische Grenzpolizei). Two separate and distinct uniforms were worn during this time by the state police (Green) and City Police (Blue). The last city police force was Munich, which was finally merged into the state police in 1975. This organization was also prevalent in the other American Sector states.

=== Green uniforms ===
From 1945 all German police forces wore different coloured uniforms, but beginning in the mid-seventies the police of all West German Länder and West Berlin wore the same uniform that Heinz Oestergaard designed most parts of in the early seventies. The standard uniform consisted of a tunic, parka, pullover without shroud, coat, visor cap and necktie in moss-green, trouser, pullover, and cardigan in brown-beige, and shirt (long and short sleeve) in bamboo-yellow. Shoes, boots, holsters, leather jackets, and other leather gear were black. Leather gloves were olive drab. Exceptions were the visor caps with a white top worn by the Verkehrspolizei, or traffic police. The Verkehrspolizei wore white gloves, tunics, and coats during traffic duties and ceremonial duties (like white holsters and leather gear). In some Länder all officers wore visor caps with white tops in general. The Wasserschutzpolizei wore uniforms of a slightly different design. They had dark or navy-blue jackets, the shirt was white, and the visor cap had a white top. The BGS wore a forest green uniform with a bamboo-yellow shirt. After German reunification, the Volkspolizei was broken up into Landespolizei and switched to the standard uniform. During the period of transition they still wore their old uniforms, but with western-style sleeves and cap emblems.

Vehicle markings were also redesigned to conform to a white and green livery with the legend "Polizei" in bold lettering.

=== Blue uniforms ===
All German State Police Forces (German: Landespolizei) and the Federal Police (German: Bundespolizei) shifted after 2005 to blue uniforms to conform with the common blue look of most police forces in Europe. In line with the uniforms, police vehicles and various items of equipment also changed their main color to blue. Although there are 16 states, currently only six types of state police uniforms are in use, because many states co-operate in the design and sourcing of the police uniforms. Cap badges, patches and rank remain the same as before, just in blue. Vehicle liveries also changed to a silver/blue or white/blue design.

State Police Force	Police uniform type	Launched in	Conversion finished in	Conversion to blue patrol cars
Baden-Württemberg State Police	Baden-Württemberg	2010	2011	2008
Bavarian State Police	Bavaria: a modification of the Austrian federal police uniform	2016	2018	2016
Berlin State Police	Brandenburg	2010	2013	2010
Brandenburg State Police	Brandenburg	2008	2010	2005
Bremen State Police	Hamburg	2006	2010	2006
Hamburg State Police	Hamburg	2005	2005	2002
Hesse State Police	Hesse	2008	2008	2005
Lower Saxony State Police	Hamburg	2006	2008	2004
Mecklenburg-Vorpommern State Police	Hamburg	2009	2011	2009
North Rhine-Westphalia State Police	North Rhine-Westphalia	2007	2012	2007
Rhineland-Palatinate State Police	Hesse	2008	2012	2006
Saarland State Police	Hesse	2015	2016	2015
Saxony State Police	Brandenburg	2009	2012	2008
Saxony-Anhalt State Police	mixed uniform type of Brandenburg and Hesse uniform types	2009	2012	2006
Schleswig-Holstein State Police	Hamburg	2006	2008	2005
Thuringia State Police, running out	Hesse uniform type, running out	2009	2011	2006
Thüringen State Police	Hamburg uniform type (new type since 2020)	2020	ongoing	2006

== Exceptions ==
The Bundeskriminalamt (the German Federal Criminal Police Office) and the Bundespolizei (Federal Police, formerly known as the Bundesgrenzschutz/BGS) are federal institutions that are not part of the Landespolizei. Another police is the Polizei beim Deutschen Bundestag (Police at the Bundestag).

== See also ==
- Federal Police (Germany)
- Landespolizei (Liechtenstein)
- Law enforcement in Germany
- State police

Crime:

- Crime in Germany
- Police brutality by country#Germany
