= Baden-Württemberg Police =

State law-enforcement agency in Germany

Baden-Württemberg Police Polizei Baden-Württemberg
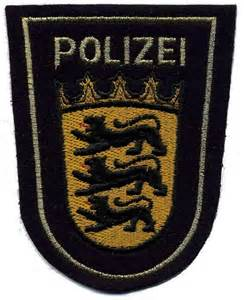

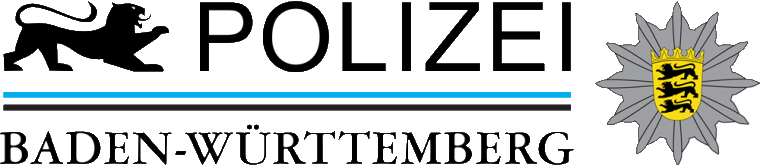

Agency overview
- Formed: April 25, 1952
- Employees: 35,000 (2021)

Jurisdictional structure
- Operations jurisdiction: Baden-Württemberg, GER
- Location of Baden-Württemberg shown in Germany
- Area: 35.751,46 km²
- Population: 10,703,000
- Governing body: Landtag of Baden-Württemberg
- Constituting instrument: Polizeigesetz (PolG)
- General nature: Civilian police

Operational structure
- Headquarters: Hahnemannstraße 1, Stuttgart
- Police Officers: 25.000
- Civilians: 7.000
- Agency executive: Dr. Stefanie Hinz, Landespolizeipräsidentin
- Parent agency: Ministry of the Interior Baden-Württemberg

Website
- Polizei Baden-Württemberg

Baden-Württemberg State Police is the state police force of the German state of Baden-Württemberg. It numbers approximately 35,000 police officers and civilian employees.

The four regional police authorities (called Landespolizeidirektionen in BW) are headquartered in Karlsruhe, Stuttgart, Freiburg and Tübingen. There is also a separate police authority for the city of Stuttgart. Following a police reform in 2005, the regional police authorities are now part of the regional government authorities (Regierungspräsidium). The autobahn and river police stations were reorganized from separate authorities and integrated into the respective local police departments.

Citizens also participate in public safety. This commitment to civic action is seen, for example, in the Volunteer Police program, where approximately 1,200 citizens voluntarily assist their local police in 20 towns. These volunteers are specially trained, wear uniforms and are armed. Their main duty is crime prevention: conducting walking patrols to deter street crime, patrolling near schools and kindergartens and maintaining contact with potential victims of crime and juvenile delinquents.

The Landeskriminalamt (State Investigation Bureau) was founded in 1952, is situated in Stuttgart and employs 520 officers and 430 civilian staff. Its missions are: witness protection, state security, SWAT (Spezialeinsatzkommando) team operations, undercover investigations, statistics, monitoring the development of crime, crime prevention, criminal investigations analysis, exchange of information with foreign countries and forensic science.

The Police Support Group HQ (Bereitschaftspolizeipräsidium) in Göppingen is the recruiting and training agency for the BW police and controls five rapid reaction battalions (Bereitschaftspolizeidirektionen) (BPD), the SWAT team and the state police band. The BPDs are situated in Bruchsal, Göppingen, Biberach, Lahr and Böblingen and have approximately 4,000 officers as the state's mobile police reserve and school training staff.

There are eight river police stations in Baden-Württemberg along the Rhine and Neckar rivers and on Lake Constance. The aviation unit falls under LPD Stuttgart and has eight modern helicopters and one fixed-wing aircraft based at Stuttgart Airport and Baden Airport near Söllingen. Two of the helicopters are EC 155 transport versions and six are MD 900/902 police operation models. Three are equipped with night-sun and video/night-vision equipment.

== Tasks ==
Some of the main tasks of the Baden-Württemberg Police is the prevention of danger and disturbance and maintenance of public safety, as a part of domestic security. They prevent and intervene in unlawful activity of any kind, regulate traffic control, and receive emergency calls.

== History ==
After the liberation of Germany by the Allies in 1945, the American occupying power initially took over all state authority in the territory of the state of Württemberg-Baden. In 1952 the state of Baden-Württemberg was founded and a police law was passed. Today's police work is based on this law.

The head of the Baden-Württemberg police, Andreas Renner, was accused of having pressured a much younger female commissioner to perform sexual favors in 2022. Renner was acquitted in the 2023 sexual assault trial before the Stuttgart regional court.

== Education and police University ==
The bachelor's degree in policing is mandatory for police officers of higher-level police service in Baden-Württemberg. The Police University in Villingen-Schwenningen trains the police officers of the state of Baden-Württemberg for the higher-level police service. It has a capacity of around 1,300 study places and employs 58 lecturers. The Police University was founded in 1979 and was initially housed in the former Maria Tann monastery. In 1985, the university moved into its current building on the outskirts of Schwenningen. Of the three cohorts studying at the same time, one (approx. 430 students) is always doing an internship.

== Uniform ==
In 2007, the state government decided that the Baden-Württemberg Police would change from their original green uniforms to blue uniforms and patrol vehicles. The uniform change-over would occur between 2009 and 2011 to minimise the cost of the conversion. Beginning 1 July 2008, the new uniforms were given out to some departments, such as the district of Hohenlohe or Neckar-Odenwald-Kreis, as a trial. During 2010/11 the new uniforms were introduced statewide.

== Warrant card ==
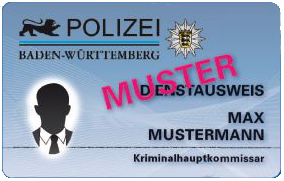
Warrant card (German: Dienstausweis) since 2011

Formerly the warrant card was made out of green linen paper and could be folded. In 2011 a new card was introduced in credit card format. Along with the color change of the police from green to blue the card was colored in blue. A hologram in star shape should make it tamper-proof.

== Vehicles ==
Overall, the Baden-Württemberg police has about 5,300 vehicles.

=== Motor vehicles ===
Since 2011, Mercedes-Benz and Volkswagen are used as service vehicles.

Beginning in mid-2010, a total of 1038 vehicles, including 99 VW Golf and 17 VW Caddy in a neutral varnish and 922 Mercedes-Benz C-Class, including 118 police vehicles, were leased for 36 months. In the second installment of 2011, a total of 1691 vehicles, including 1094 Mercedes-Benz e220 CDI T patrol cars and 423 Mercedes-Benz C 220 CDI and 174 VW Golf Variant were leased for 36 months. The vehicles of the Baden-Wuerttemberg Police are uniformly licensed under "BWL 4-XXXX". "BWL" stands for Baden-Württemberg state government. The number "4" stands for the Interior Ministry. The Stuttgart Regional Council uses the digits from 1000 to 2999, the regional council in Karlsruhe 3000-4999, the police headquarters in Stuttgart 5000-5999, the Regional Council of Freiburg, 6000-6999, the Regional Council of Tübingen 7000-7999, and the riot police 8000-8999.

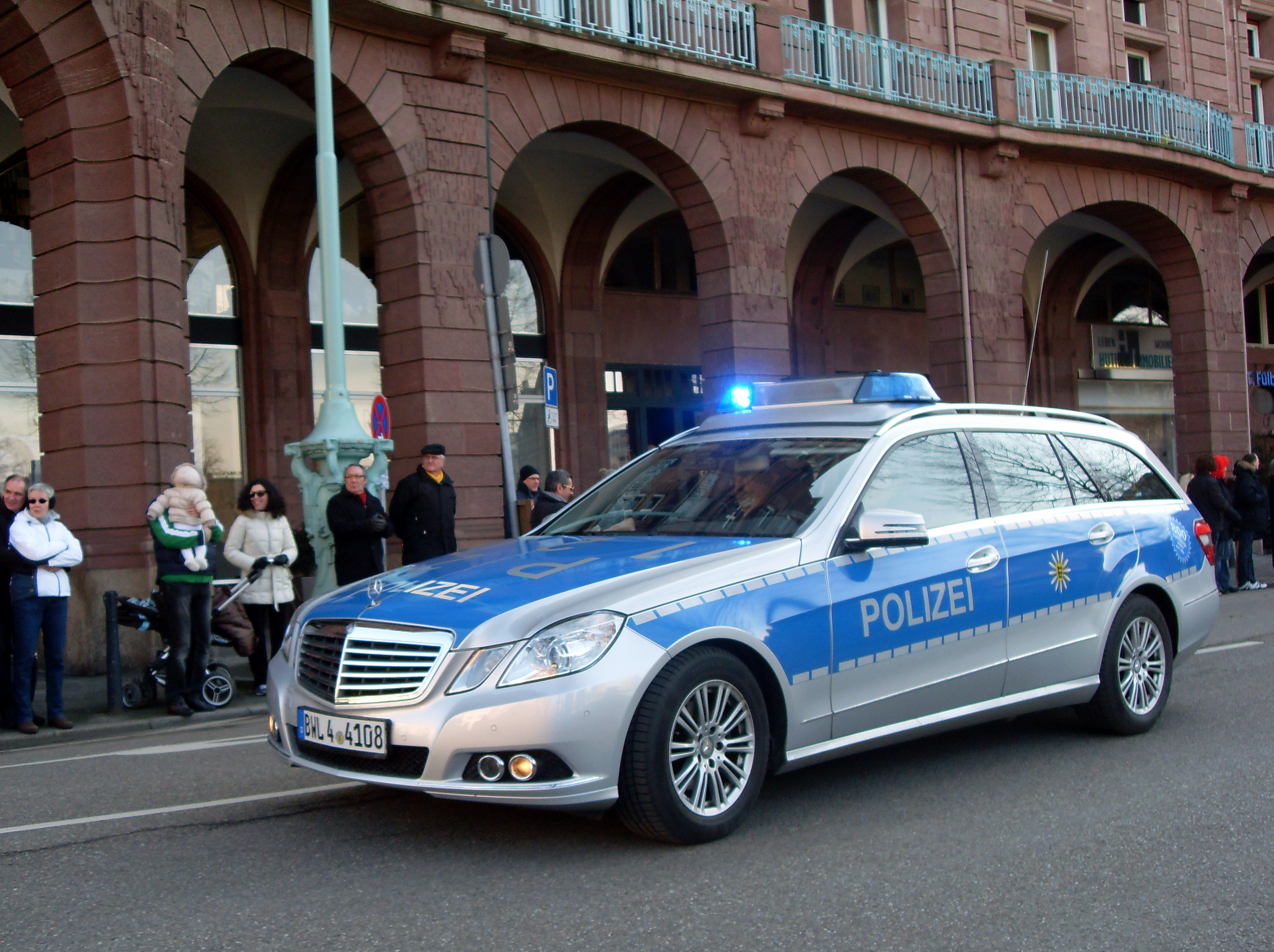
Mercedes-Benz Police patrol vehicle of the State Police of Baden-Württemberg with blue-silver livery, seen in Mannheim

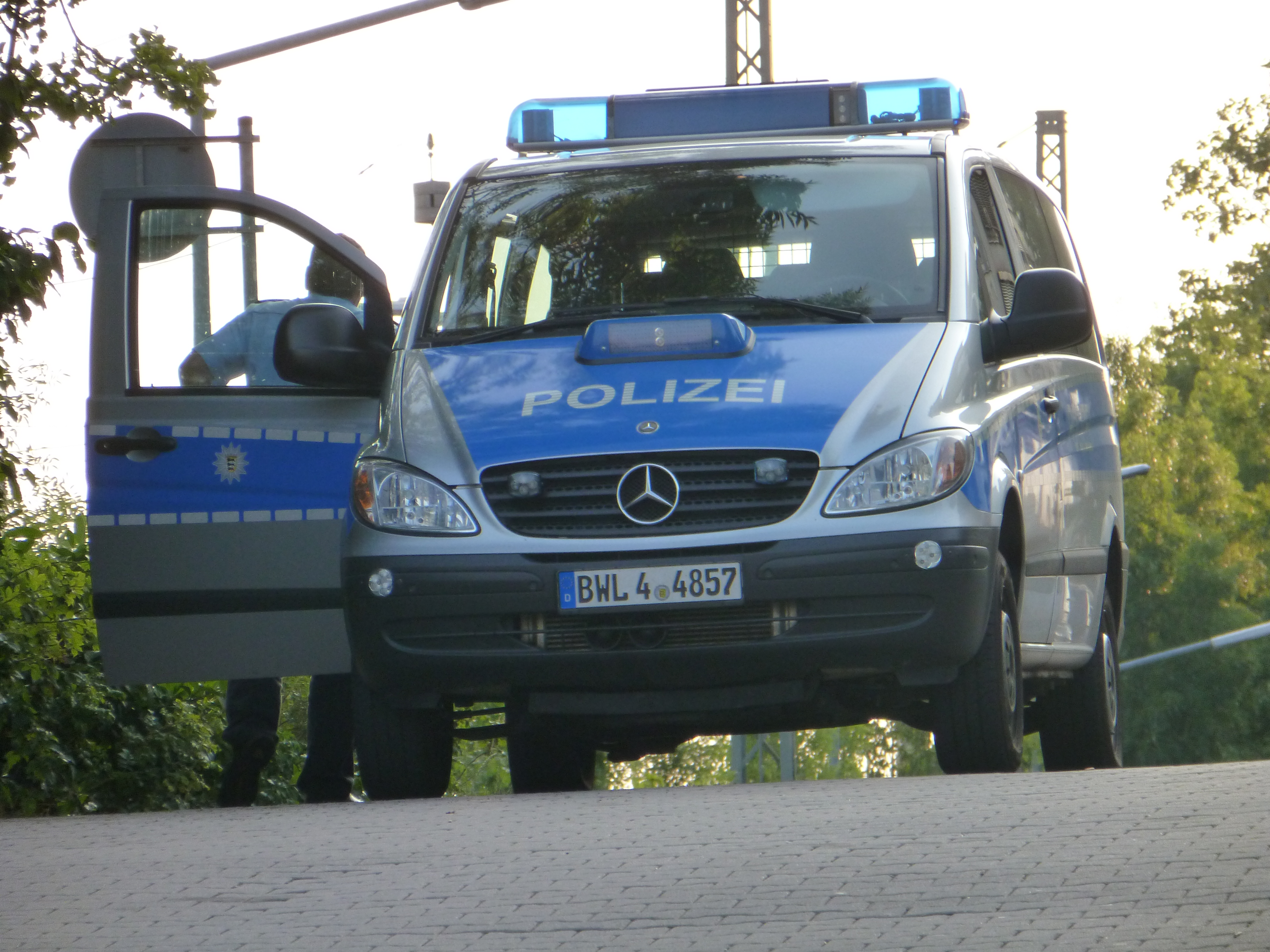
Police vehicle Mercedes-Benz Vito in Pforzheim (Baden-Württemberg)

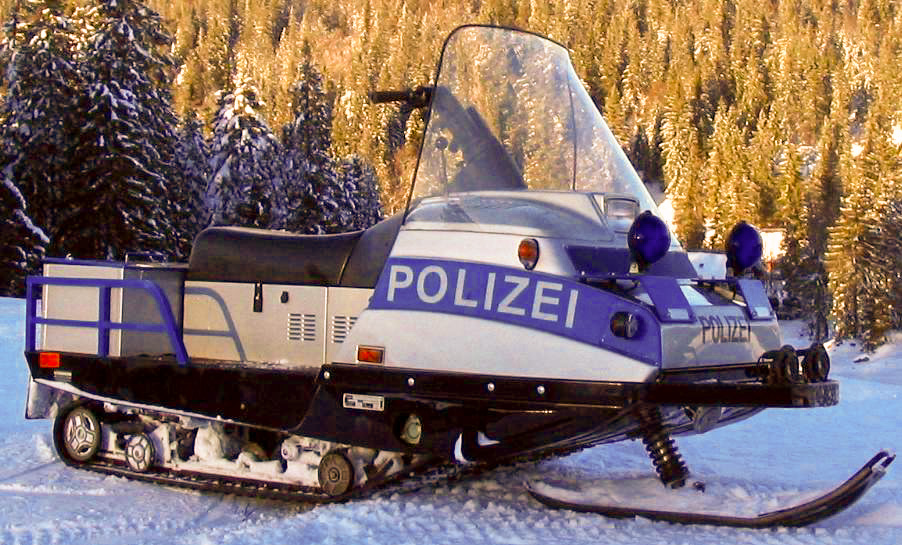
Snowmobile Ski Doo Alpin II Lenzkirch Police post at the Feldberg (Baden-Württemberg)

=== Aircraft ===
The helicopter fleet of the helicopter squadron of the Baden-Wuerttemberg police constists of six EC 145 T2 helicopters. They are in service since 2016 and got ordered for a total of 60 million euros by the Ministry of the Interior of Baden-Württemberg. They are stationed at Stuttgart Airport and Baden Airport.

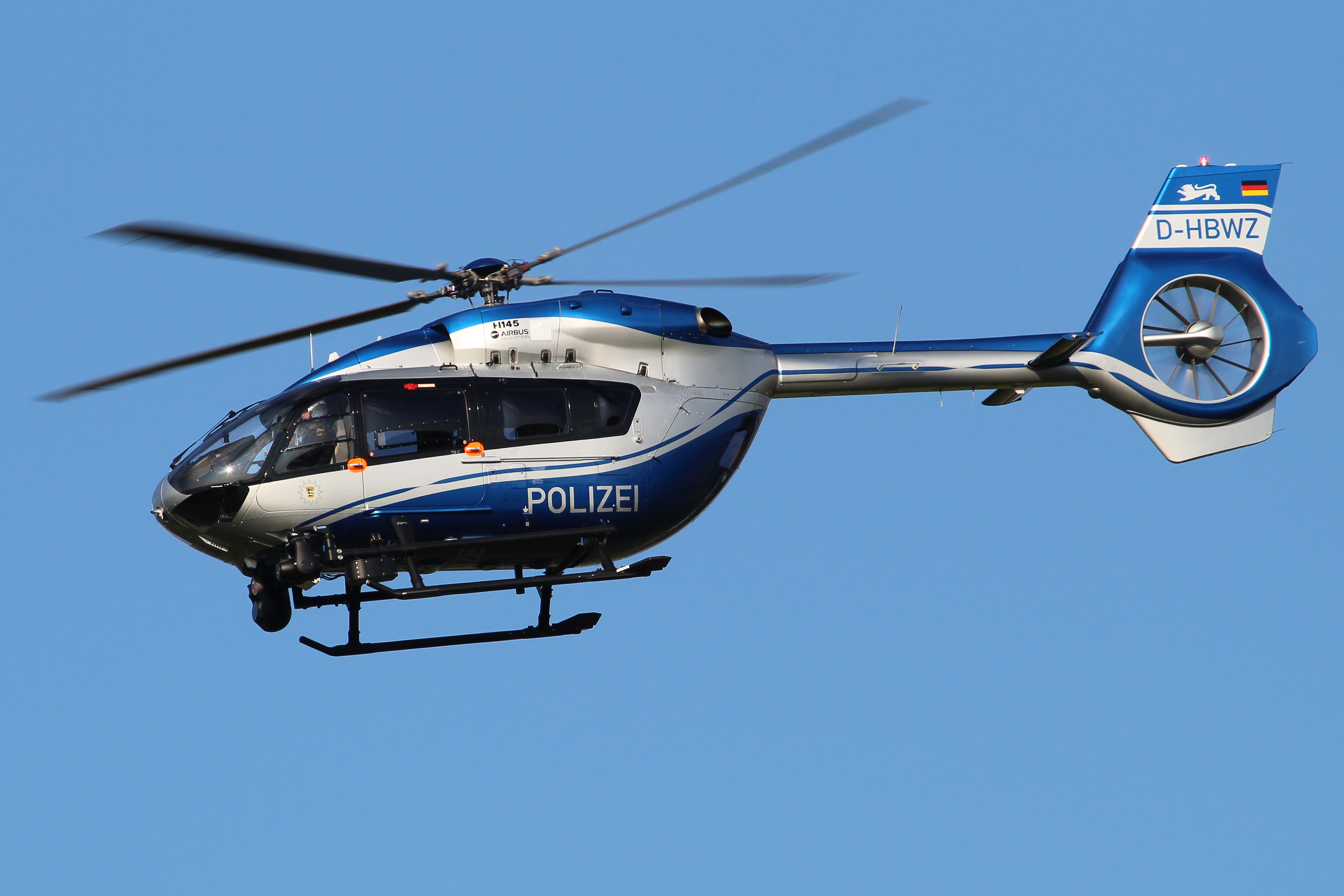

=== Boats ===
The Baden-Wuerttemberg water police has a total of 16 heavy and 14 light patrol boats of various types, and 16 rubber dinghies are also used.

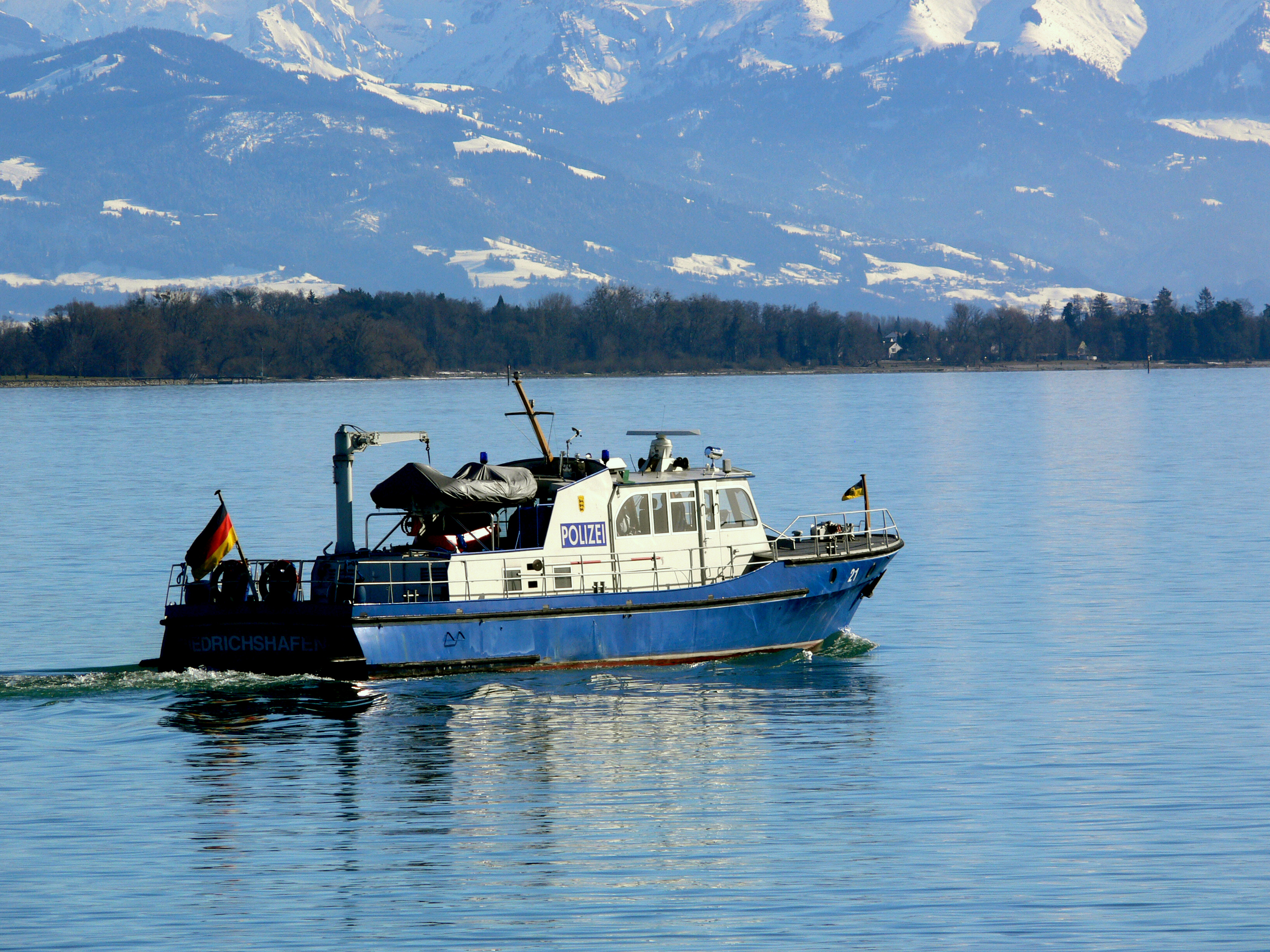
Water Police boat WSP 21 on Lake Constance at the exit from Friedrichshafen

== See also ==
- Landespolizei
