= Brandenburg Police =

State police for the German state of Brandenburg

Brandenburg Police Polizei Brandenburg

Agency overview
- Employees: 8,000+ (2020)

Jurisdictional structure
- Operations jurisdiction: Brandenburg, Germany
- Location of Brandenburg shown in Germany
- Area: 29,476 km^{2}
- Population: 2.5 million
- Governing body: Ministry of the Interior and Local Affairs
- General nature: Local civilian police

Operational structure
- Headquarters: Potsdam, Brandenburg
- Agency executive: Oliver Stepien (Chief of Police), Polizeipräsident

Website
- Official website

The Brandenburg Police (German: Polizei Brandenburg) is Landespolizei for the German state of Brandenburg.

== Organisation ==
Under the Police Headquarters there are four regional headquarters (North, East, South, West), as well as the State Office of Criminal Investigation and the Directorate of Special Services. The four police directorates report to 16 police inspectorates, 9 water police stations and 5 motorway police stations. The 16 police inspectorates are divided into the headquarters of the police inspectorate and a further 33 police stations.

The police headquarters is headed by Oliver Stepien (Polizeipräsident) as police president.
