= Heinz Oestergaard =

German fashion designer (1916–2003)

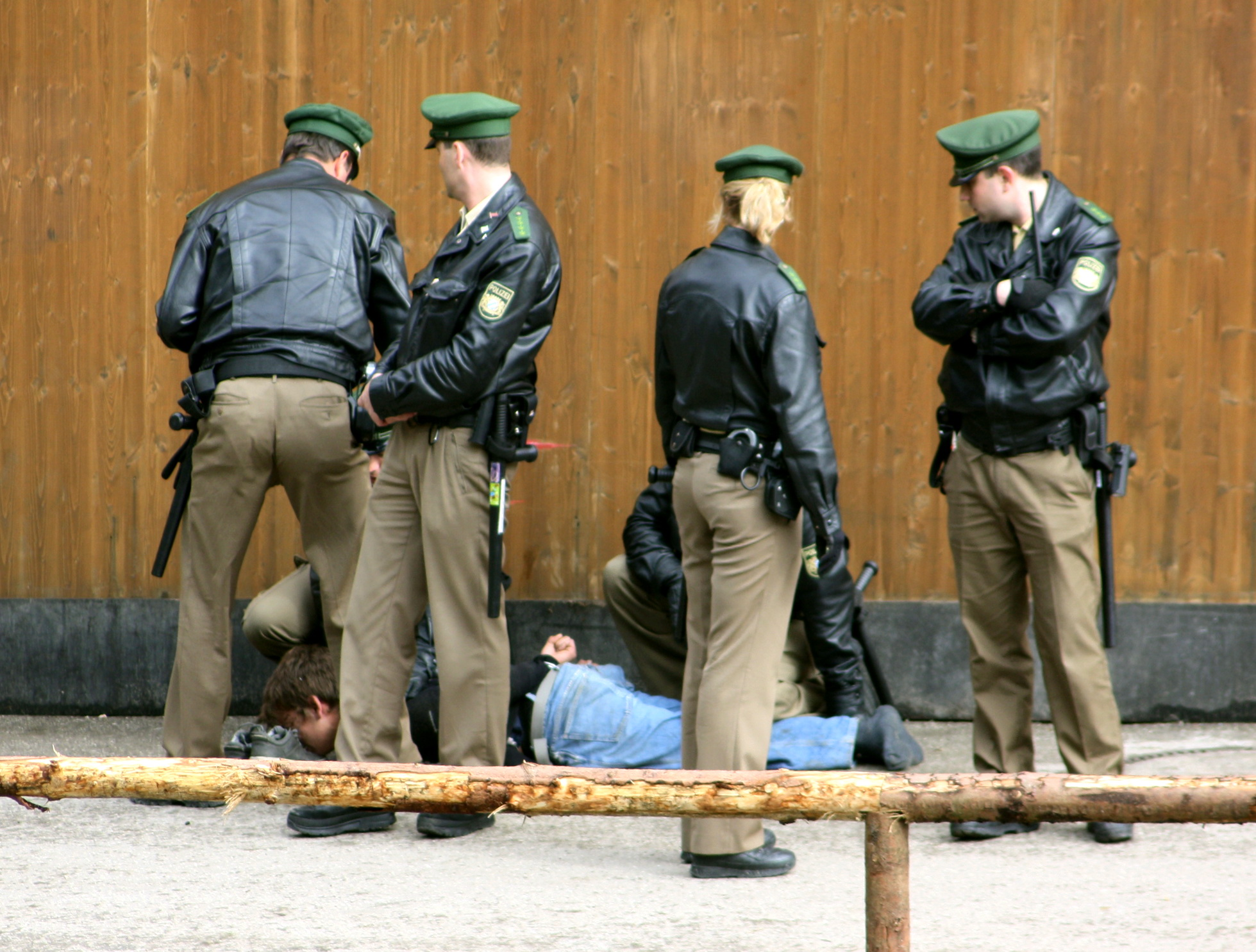
The German police uniform was designed by Heinz Oestergaard.

Heinz Oestergaard (15 August 1916 – 10 May 2003) was a German fashion designer.

He was considered one of the leading German fashion designers of the postwar period. After having succeeded in Berlin, where he designed clothes for Zarah Leander and Maria Schell, Oestergaard went to Munich in 1967. He there became the fashion manager of the catalogue company Quelle. He there replaced the customary wire used for bodices by stretch fabric. In 1971 he designed police uniforms and the green uniforms of the German police forces.

== Awards ==
- 1996: Verdienstorden des Landes Berlin (Order of Merit of Berlin)
- 1996: Bundesverdienstkreuz 1. Klasse der Bundesrepublik Deutschland (Officer's Cross of the Federal Republic of Germany)
