= Wasserschutzpolizei =

German river police

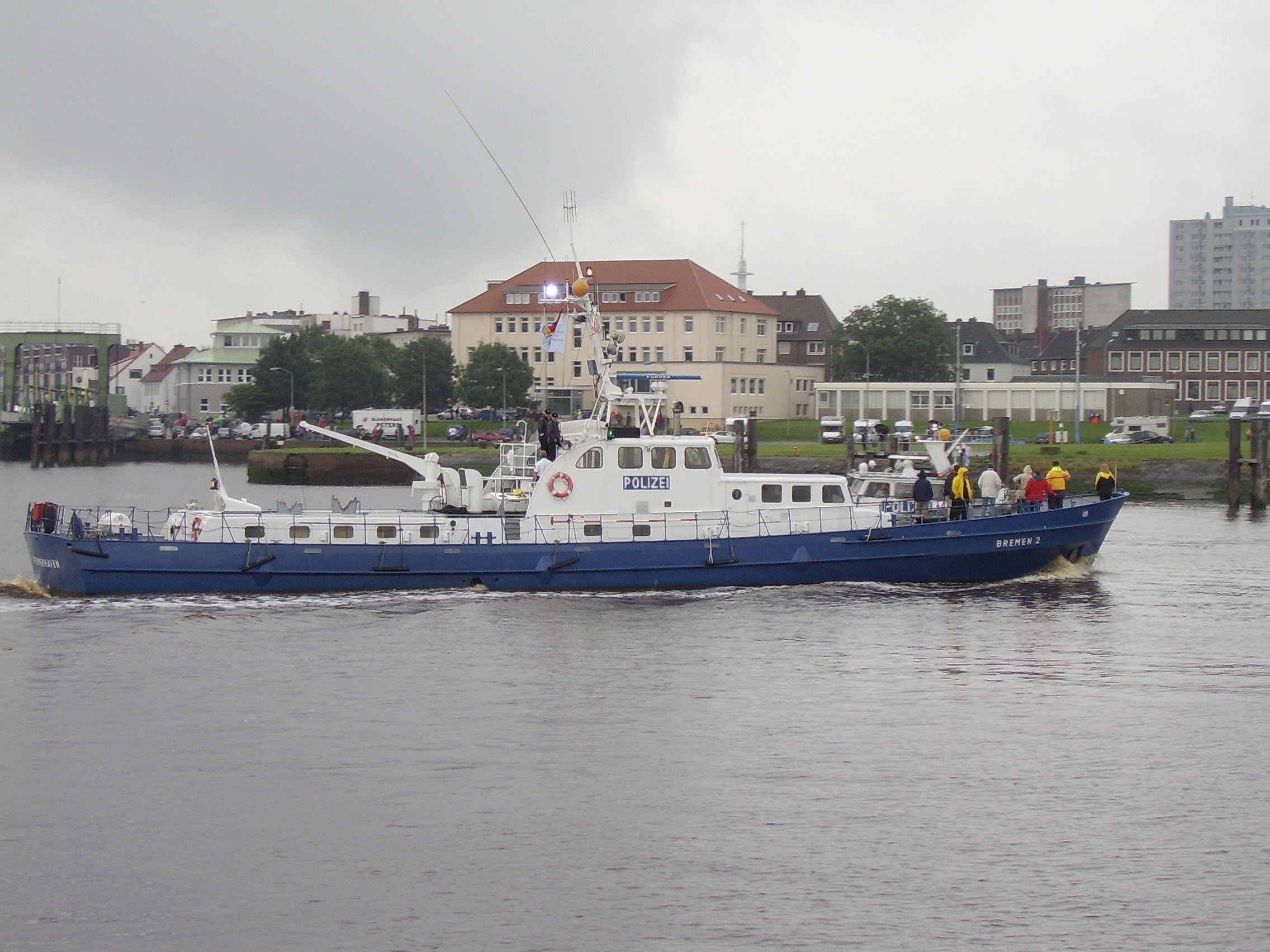
Boat of the Bremen Wasserschutzpolizei in Bremerhaven

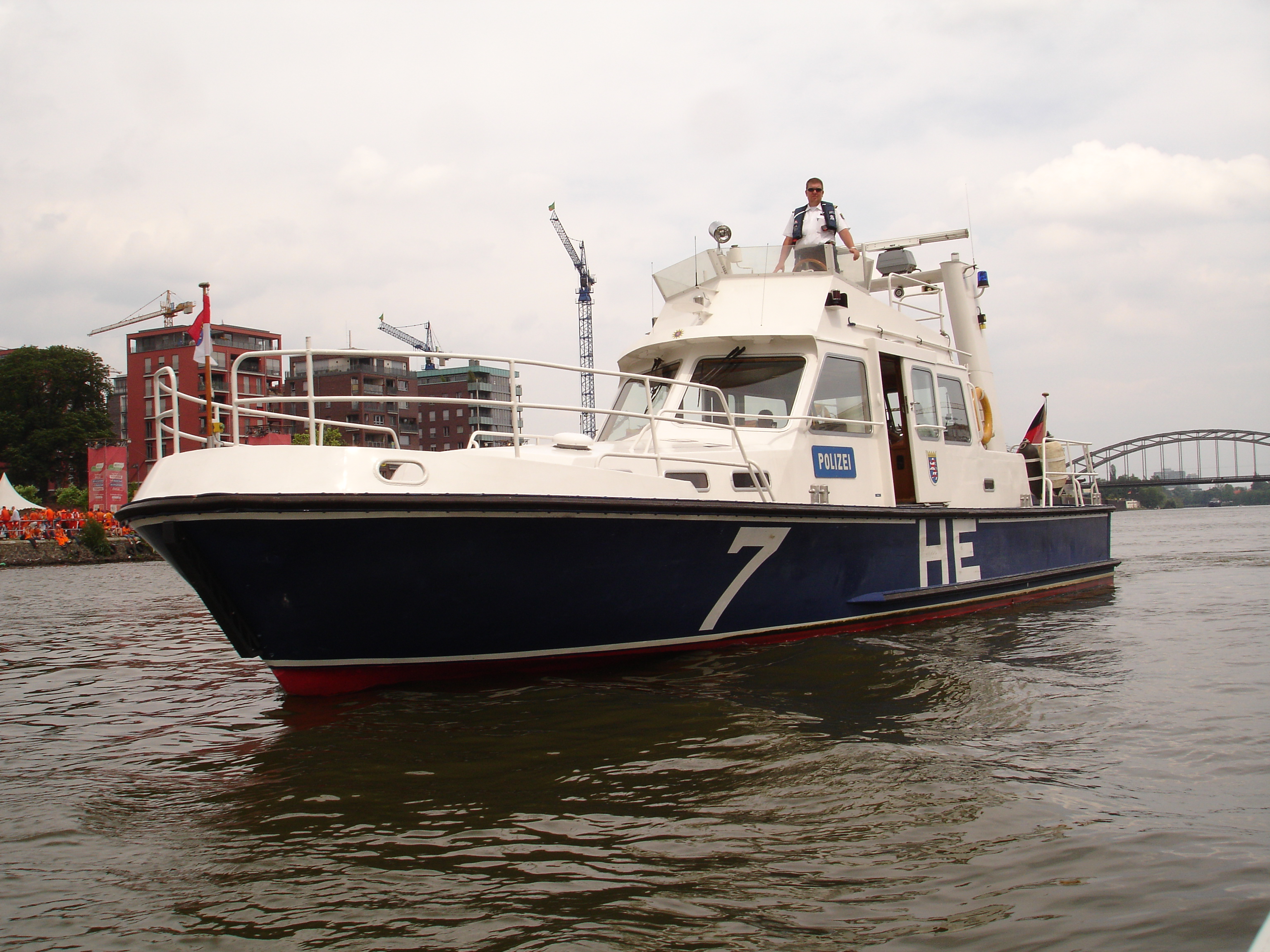
A WSP patrol boat of the Hesse State Police

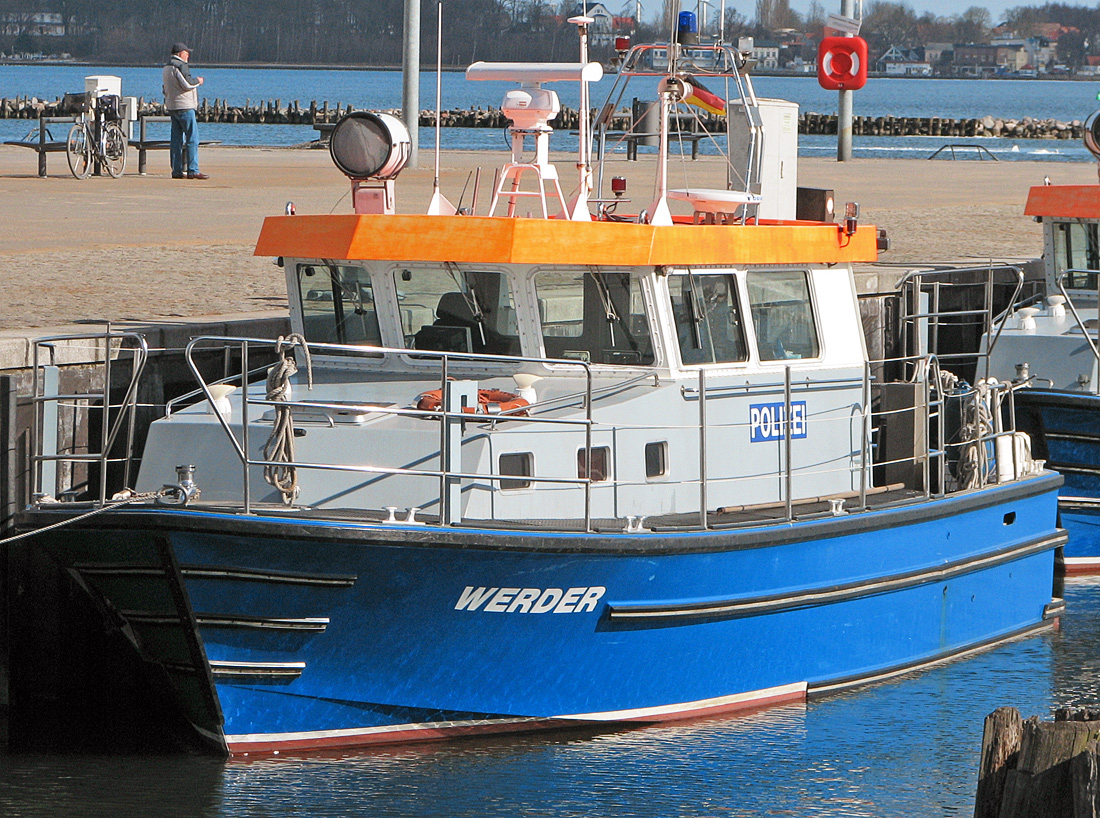
A WSP patrol boat of the Mecklenburg Vorpommern State Police

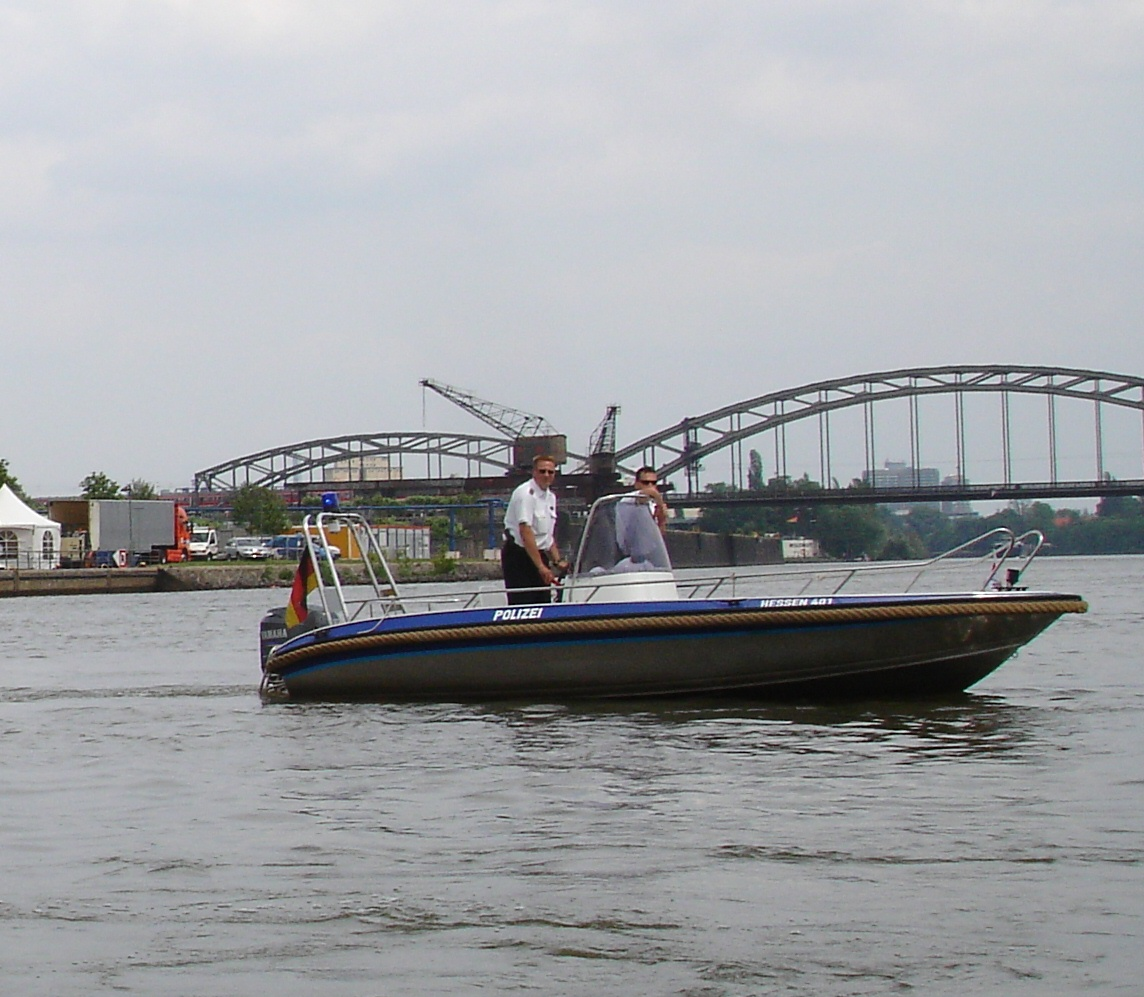
A WSP patrol boat of the Hesse State Police in Frankfurt

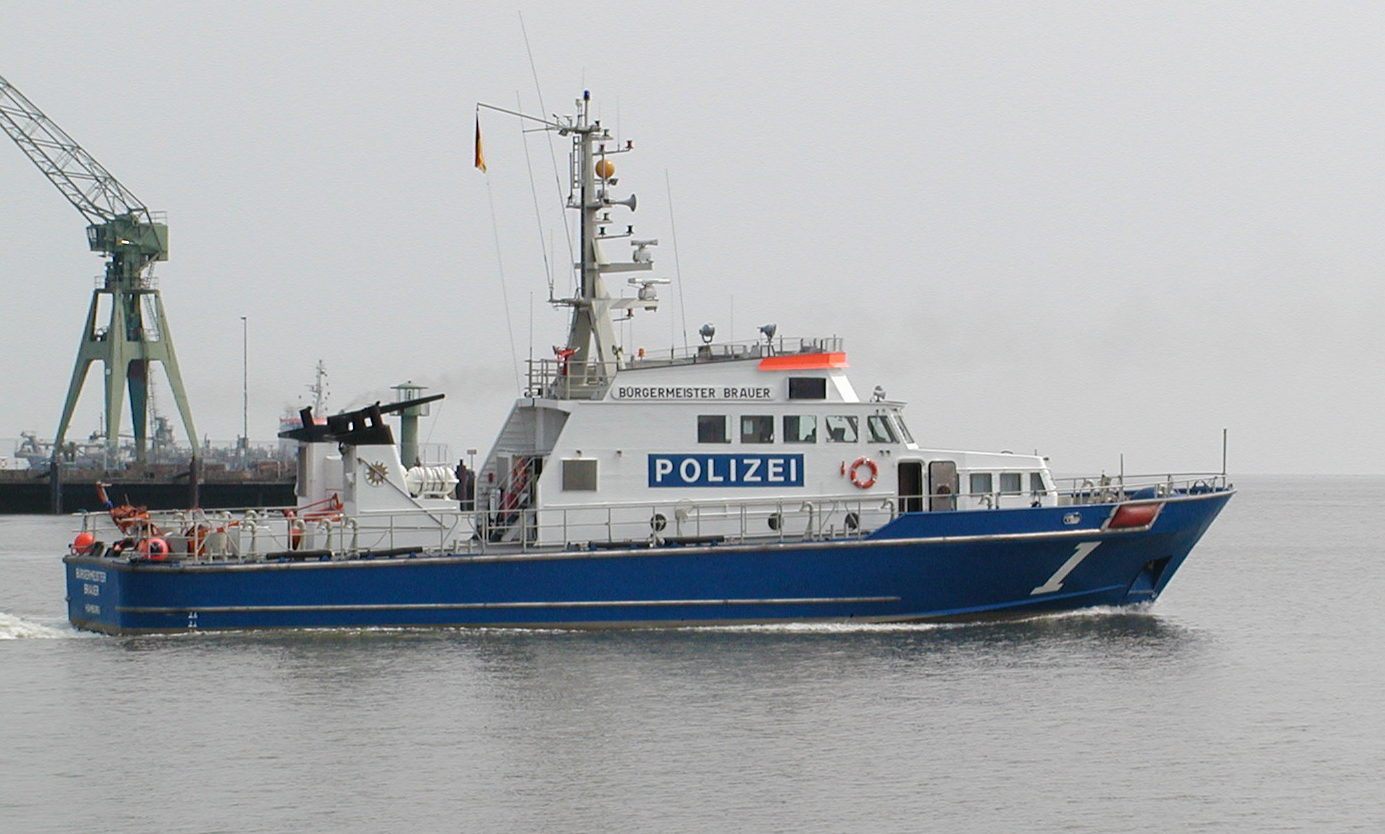
A boat of the Hamburg State Police

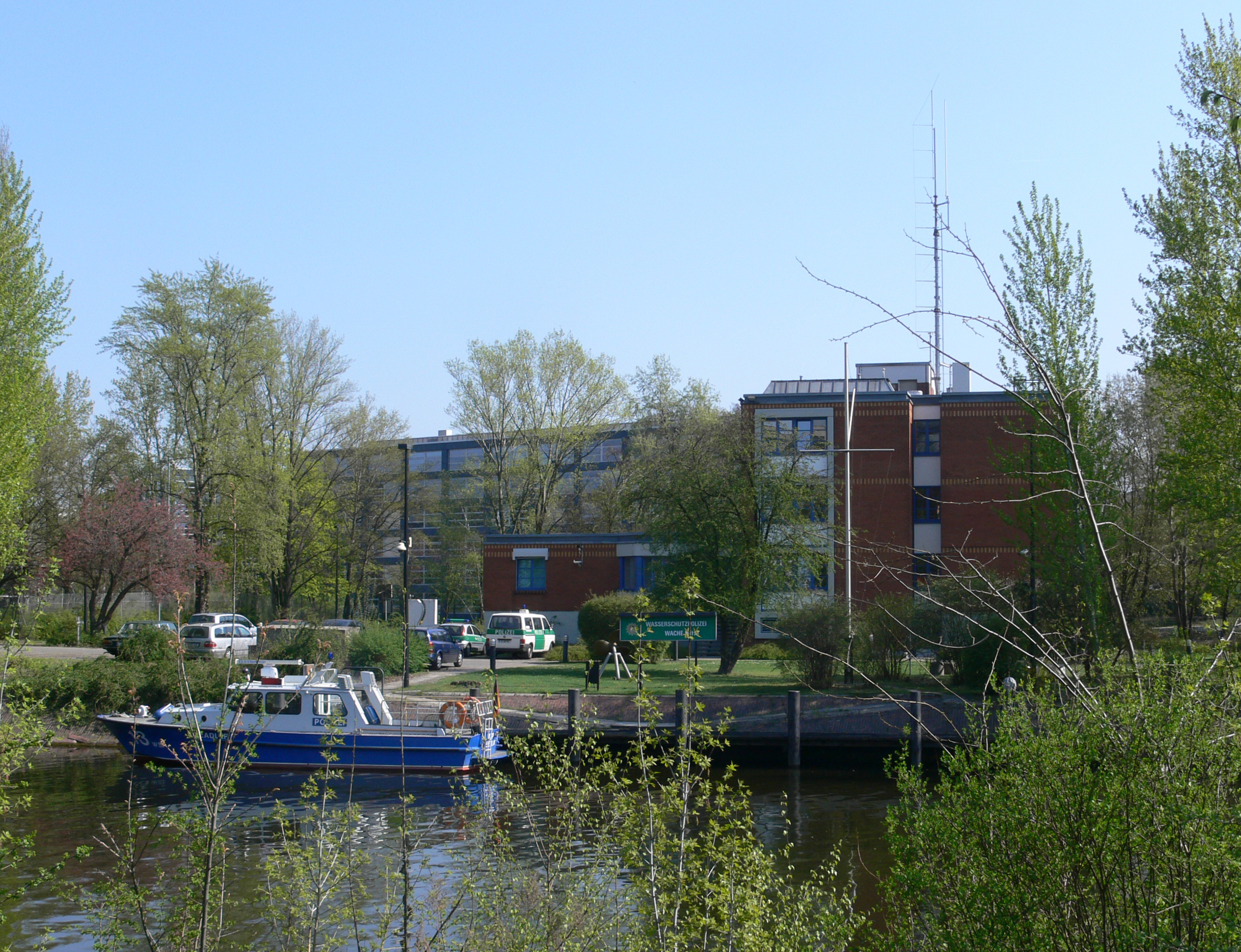
Police station and boat of the Berlin WSP, at the junction of the River Spree and Charlottenburg Canal

The Wasserschutzpolizei (German: [ˈvasɐʃʊt͡spoliˌt͡saɪ̯], WSP - literally translated "Water Protection Police" in German) is the river police that patrols the waterways, lakes and harbours of Germany around the clock. The WSP are part of the Landespolizei (State Police). The Federal Police (Bundespolizei or BPOL) maintains 16 patrol craft and helicopters are part of the Coast Guard (Küstenwache) and assigned to coastal BPOL stations. The watercraft include six offshore patrol vessels, e.g. those of the Bad Bramstedt class, as well as a number of fast inshore vessels and one tugboat.

== About ==
Germany has about 7,500 km of navigable waterways that are responsible for about 30 percent of goods transported. The heavy commercial traffic and increasing recreational boat traffic requires police supervision. In case of shipwrecks, often involving hazardous materials, they are responsible for warning other shipping. The WSP also often performs other duties such as enforcing environmental laws.

These police officers in Navy-like uniforms often have inland or maritime shipping experience and are trained at the German Water Police School (Wasserschutzpolizeischule) in Hamburg. For practical reasons the WSP of one state may have jurisdiction in the territory of another state (for example, the Hamburg WSP is in charge of a section of the Elbe River that spans the states of Mecklenburg-Vorpommern, Lower Saxony, Schleswig-Holstein, and Hamburg.)

== Baden-Württemberg ==
The Baden-Württemberg WSP is decentrally organized and attached to the police departments whose area of operations their stations are located in. Baden-Württemberg Police changed to this structure in 2005. There are eight river police stations in Baden-Württemberg along the Rhine and Neckar rivers and on Lake Constance.

== Bavaria ==
The Bavarian River Police is part of the Bavarian State Police. The Bavarian River Police Centre is part of the Central Franconia Police HQ and is in Schwabach. The centre supports nine river police stations along the Main River, Danube and the Main-Danube Canal as well as 14 police stations with water police missions on the 25 largest lakes in Bavaria.

== Berlin ==
The Berlin WSP is responsible for patrolling the extensive waterway network of the city and state of Berlin, and forms part of Central Directorate of the Berlin Police. Besides the normal responsibilities of the water police, the Berlin WSP also has an important security role because of the many government and other capital city related buildings to be found alongside the River Spree and other inner-urban waterways.

The Berlin WSP comprises three geographically based Wachen. WSP West operates out of a police station on the River Havel at Spandau, WSP Mitte operates from a station at the junction of the River Spree and the Charlottenburg Canal, and WSP Ost operates from a station on the River Spree at Treptow.

== Brandenburg ==
The Brandenburg WSP is responsible for patrolling the inland waterways of the state of Brandenburg, and forms part of the Brandenburg State Police. It operates from nine bases, located at Brandenburg, Eisenhüttenstadt, Erkner, Hohensaaten, Lehnitz, Potsdam, Spreewald, Wittenberge and Zeuthen.

The Brandenburg WSP operates a fleet of 28 boats of several types.

== Bremen ==
The Bremen WSP is responsible for patrolling the ports and inland waterways of the state Free Hanseatic City of Bremen, and forms part of the Bremen State Police. It operates from bases in Bremen and Bremerhaven.

== Hamburg ==
The Water Police in Hamburg is part of the state police and patrols the rivers Elbe, Alster, and their branches, as well as parts of the coastal region of the North Sea.

As of 2009, the Hamburg Water Police had five stations, two of which are not actually in Hamburg. One is located at the mouth of the Elbe river in Cuxhaven, Lower Saxony, and another is a sub-station in Lauenburg, a town in Schleswig-Holstein. The other three are in Hamburg proper.

== Hesse ==
The Hesse State Police WSP is part of the state's Police Support Group (Bereitschaftspolizei). The river police has six stations along the Rhine, Main, Fulda, Werra and Lahn rivers and one for the Edersee Reservoir. The headquarters of the Hesse WSP is in Mainz-Kastell along with its central investigations group. Hesse has eight large patrol boats and 12 small ones.

== North Rhine-Westphalia ==
The North Rhine-Westphalia Police's Water police is centrally organized and patrols over 900 km of waterways. Its headquarters is in Duisburg as part of Duisburg police headquarters and it has stations (Wasserschutzpolizeiwache) in Bonn, Cologne, Düsseldorf, Wesel, Emmerich, Münster, Minden, Bergeshövede, Datteln and Essen. The force has 24 boats and patrols the Rhine, Weser, Ems and Ruhr (as far as Essen) rivers and the North German canals.

== Rhineland-Palatinate ==
The Rhineland-Palatinate River Police is part of the Rheinland-Pfalz State Police and directly subordinate to the Ministry of the Interior. The HQ is in Mainz and there are 10 river police stations along the Rhine, Lahn, Saar and Moselle in Rhineland-Palatinate. The stations at Germersheim, Ludwigshafen, Mainz, Bingen, St. Goar and Andernach are responsible for the Rhine only. The stations at Bernkastel and Cochem cover only the Moselle. The station in Koblenz is responsible for Rhine, Mosselle and Lahn and the Trier station covers the Moselle and Saar.

== Saarland ==
Saarland is a small state and has only one river police station which is in Beckingen. It patrols the Saar and Moselle in Saarland and is subordinate to the Saarland Police Support Group (Bereitschaftspolizei).

== Schleswig-Holstein ==
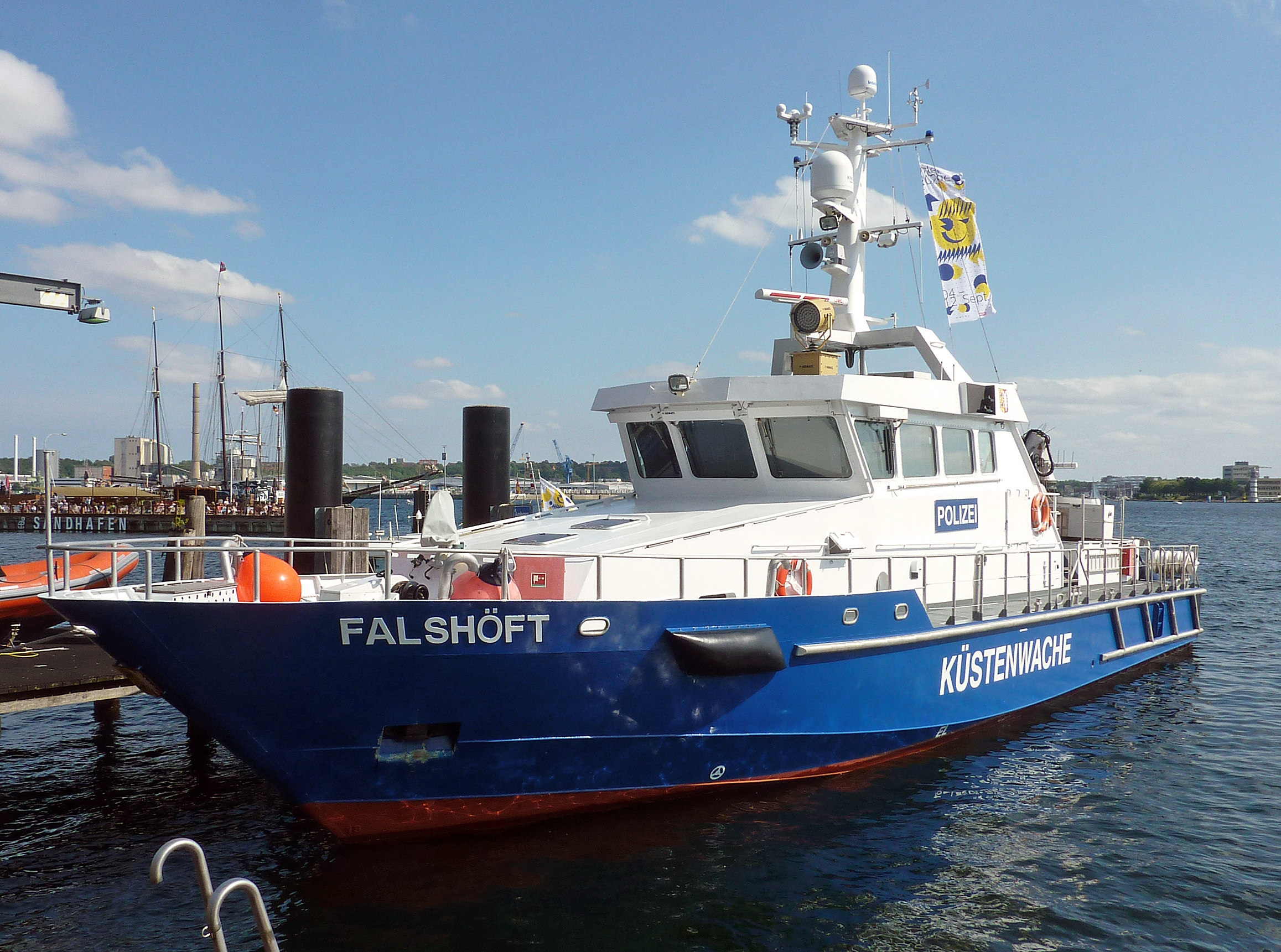
Patrolboat "Falshöft" of the Schleswig-Holstein Police

The Water Protection Police in Schleswig-Holstein is directly subordinated to the Landespolizeiamt and isn't part of a Police Directorate. Additionally to the German national waters on the Schleswig-Holstein coast, the Water protection Police also patrols the Kiel Canal.

Water Protection Police Precincts are located in Kiel, Brunsbüttel and Lübeck, its subordinated stations in Flensburg, Kappeln, Husum, Heligoland and Fehmarn.

The Island of Heligoland is patrolled by the Schleswig-Holstein Water Protection Police, as opposed to other German Islands.

== Thuringia ==
Thuringia is the only state in Germany without a river police force. Hence, recent conflicts between Thuringian police forces and left-wing groups in the Hohenfelden Reservoir area are hard to deal with for the Thuringian government.
