= Law enforcement in Germany =

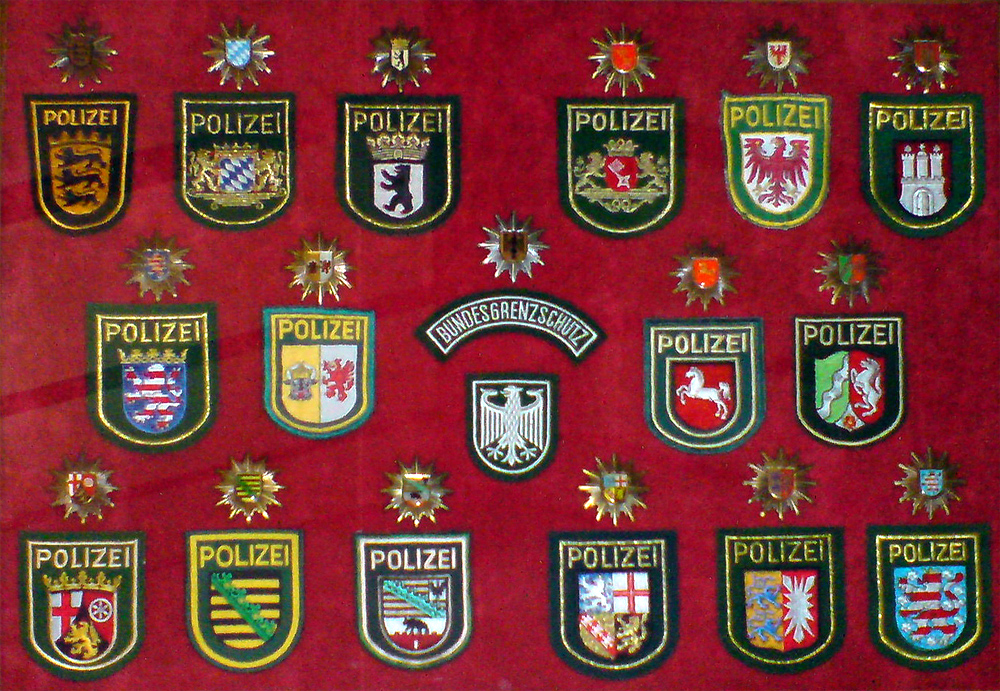
Sleeve and cap ensigns of the 16 state police forces and the former Bundesgrenzschutz (Federal Border Protection)

Law enforcement in Germany is constitutionally vested primarily with the states—one of the main features of German federalism. Additionally to those 16 state police forces (Landespolizei), there exists a federal police (Bundespolizei), as well as a federal investigative bureau (Bundeskriminalamt), the customs service (Zoll), and a small police force at the German parliament (Bundestagspolizei).

== History ==
Policing remained a responsibility of the German states even after 1871 when the country was unified. The 1919 constitution of the Weimar Republic did provide for the possibility of creating a national police force, should the necessity arise, but it was only in the Nazi era that the regular police (Ordnungspolizei) and the political police Gestapo (short for Secret State Police) were unified under central control and a national police authority was created (the Reich Security Main Office—Reichssicherheitshauptamt, or RSHA). The police, together with SD, SS and SA, became a tool of the centralized state terror and the Nazi party. Following its defeat of 1945, Germany was divided; in 1949 the three western zones were turned into the new West Germany, while the Soviet zone became East Germany. Each country pursued a different path concerning law enforcement.

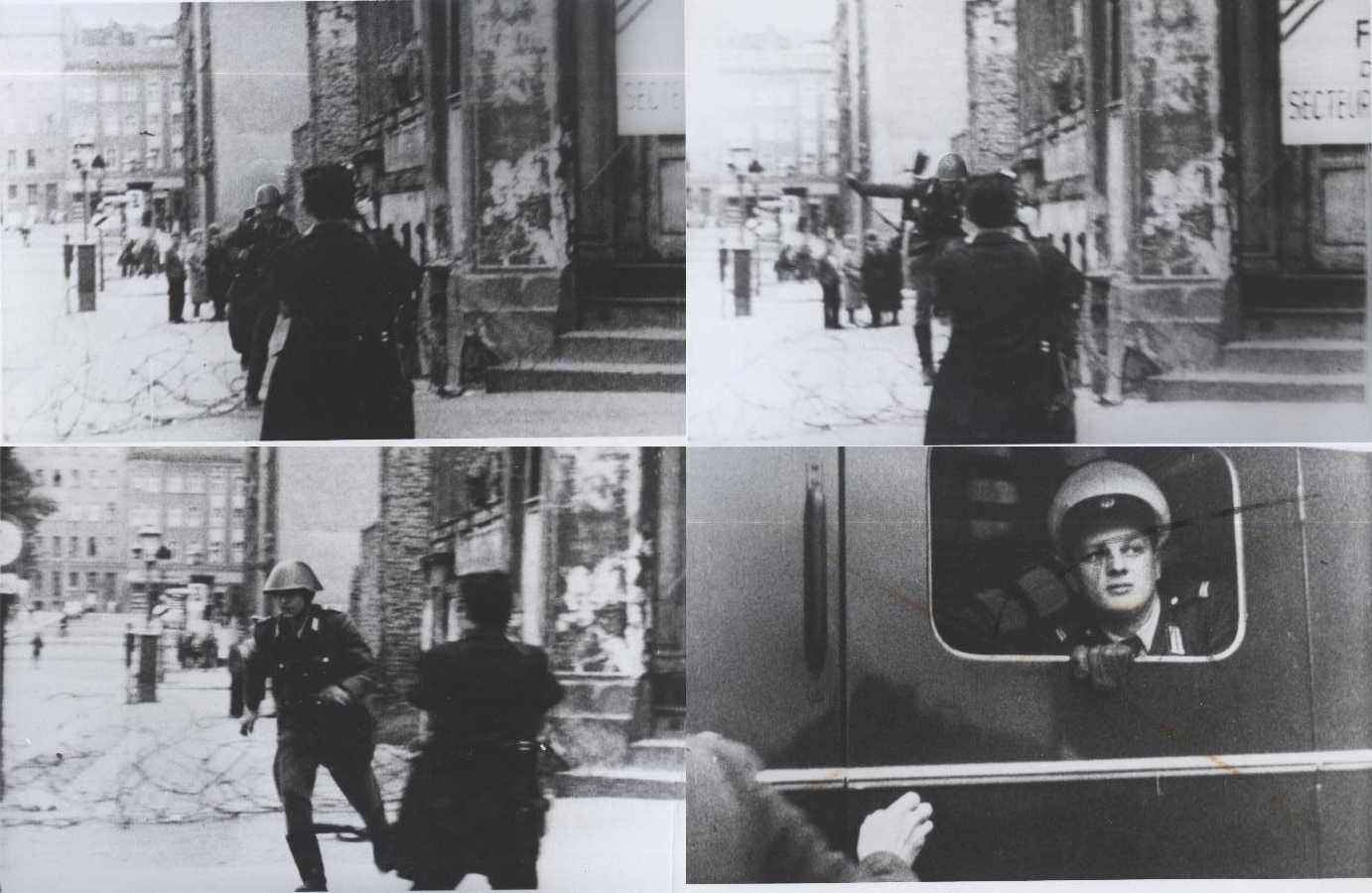
Konrad Schumann, an East German border guard, fleeing East Germany towards West Germany in 1962

In light of the gross misuse of power by the centralized Nazi state, the new West German constitution provided a strict separation of powers, placing law enforcement firmly in the hands of the states. The only policing agencies allowed at the federal level were the paramilitary Federal Border Protection (German: Bundesgrenzschutz), also responsible for coast guard services, and the Federal Office for Criminal Investigation, both under the supervision of the Federal Ministry of the Interior. East Germany created a centralized police force under the Ministry of the Interior, the paramilitary Volkspolizei (literally "People's Police"). It also established a border police force (German: Grenztruppen der DDR), initially an independent force, later integrated into the army and then reorganized as an independent military organization.

Because Germany's borders became largely open in 2005, due to the development of the European Union and spread of the Schengen Agreement to all neighbouring countries, the Federal Border Protection (Bundesgrenzschutz) was renamed to Federal Police (German: Bundespolizei).

== Federal agencies ==
=== Federal Police ===
Badge of the federal police

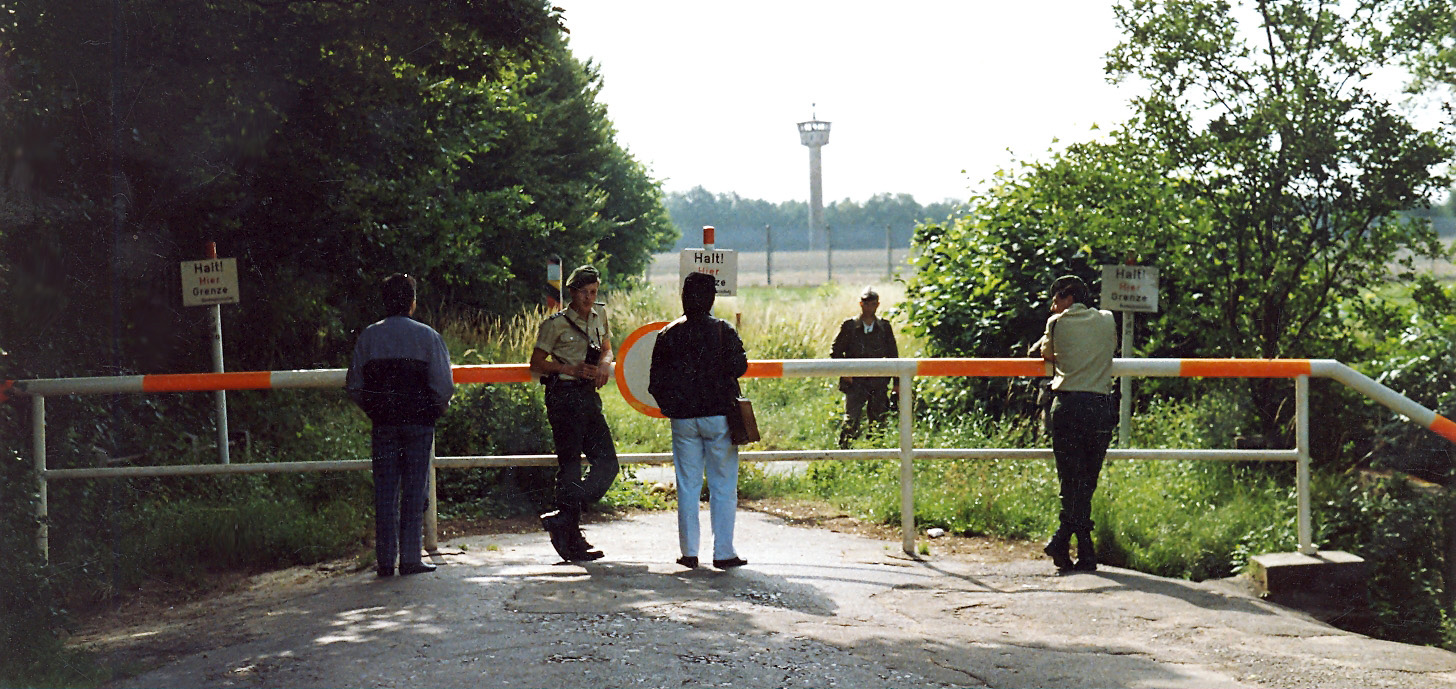
West German border personnel, civilians and an East German border guard on opposite sides of the border line at Herrnburg near Lübeck

Established in 1951, the Bundespolizei (BPOL) is the uniformed federal police force. It is subordinated to the Federal Ministry of the Interior (Bundesministerium des Innern (BMI)). The Bundespolizei was previously known as the Bundesgrenzschutz (BGS) ("Federal Border Protection") and had a more restricted role until July 1, 2005, when the law renaming the BGS as the BPOL was enacted. However, the duties of the Federal Police still are limited to the security of railway lines, main railway stations, airports, sea ports, and several other special duties, mainly related to border control.

All personnel on duty carry sidearms. Some units have light aircraft and helicopters to facilitate rapid access to remote border areas and for patrol and rescue missions. A coast guard force forms a part of the BPOL. It is equipped with 14 large patrol craft and several helicopters.

In addition to controlling Germany's border, the BPOL serves as a federal reserve force to deal with major disturbances and other emergencies beyond the scope of state police. The BPOL guards airports, and several highly trained detachments are available for special crisis situations requiring demolition equipment, helicopters, or combat vehicles. After shortcomings in police procedures and training were revealed by the terrorist attack on Israeli athletes at the 1972 Olympics, a special force known as Border Protection Group 9 (GSG-9) was formed to deal with terrorist incidents, especially hostage situations. The GSG-9 won world attention when it rescued 86 passengers on a Lufthansa airliner hijacked to Mogadishu, Somalia, in 1977.

A military rank structure similar to that of the Bundeswehr was replaced in the mid-1970s by civil service-type personnel grades. The service uniform was green but has been changed to blue.

The West German Railway Police (Bahnpolizei), formerly an independent force, and the East German Transportpolizei were restructured under the BGS to form the Bundespolizei in 1990.

=== Federal Criminal Police Office ===
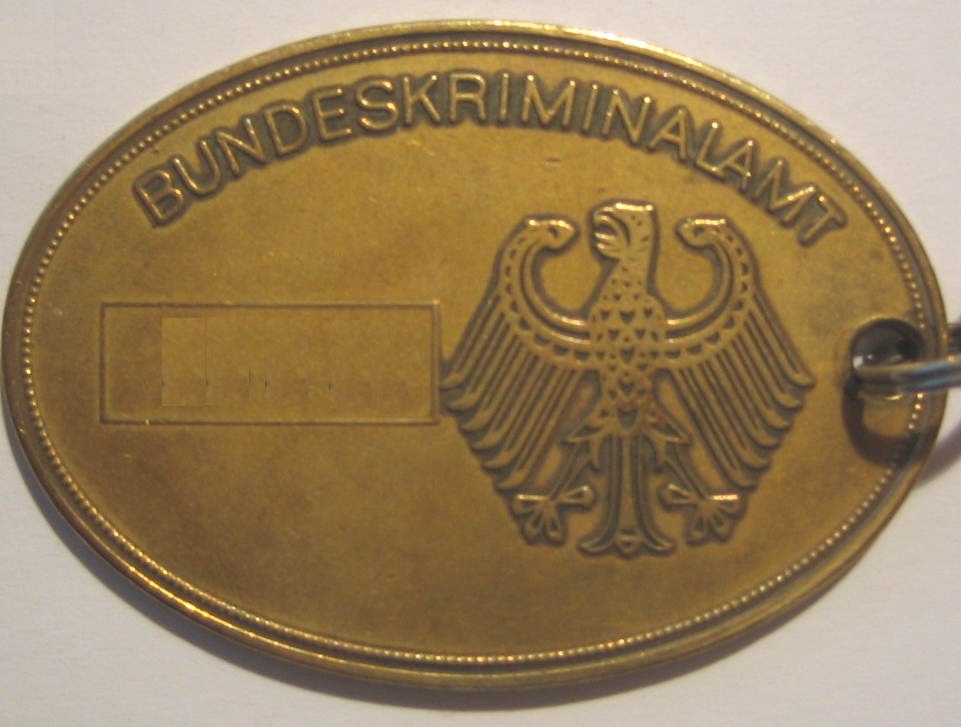
Badge of the Bundeskriminalamt (BKA; Federal Criminal Police Office)

Another central police agency, the Federal Criminal Police Office (German: Bundeskriminalamt / BKA), with approximately 7,100 agents, operates nationwide from headquarters in Wiesbaden. The BKA is a clearinghouse for criminal intelligence records.

It provides assistance to the State Criminal Police Offices (German: Landeskriminalamt / LKA) in forensic matters, research, and criminal investigations. It is also the national point of contact for the International Criminal Police Organization (Interpol). The BKA conducts its own criminal investigations or enters existing cases only when requested by state authorities, or in cases involving two or more states. The BKA has been involved in investigations against various terrorist groups since the 1960s.

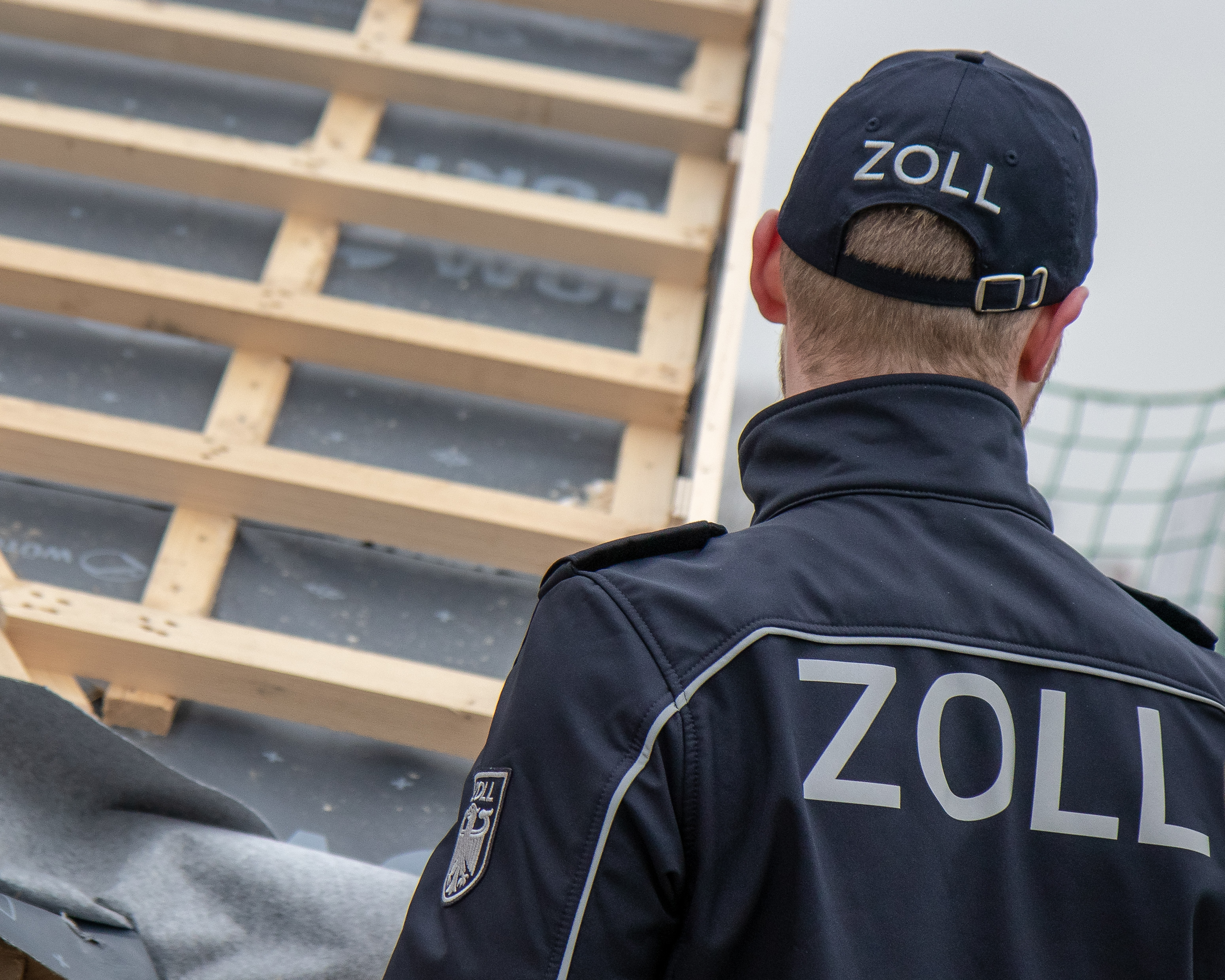
Customs officer in Zoll-uniform

=== Federal Customs Service ===
The Federal Customs Service (German: Bundeszollverwaltung) is the executive and fiscal administrative agency of the Federal Ministry of Finance. It was founded in 1949 in West Germany. The purpose of the Customs Service is to administer federal taxes, execute demands for payment on behalf of the federal government and federal statutory corporations, monitor the cross border movements of goods with regard to compliance with bans and restrictions, and prevent illicit work. Uniformed federal agents are used for the execution of the financial legislation. Subordinated to the federal customs service, the Customs Investigation Bureau in Cologne (German: Zollkriminalamt / ZKA) coordinates customs investigations nationwide in particular monitoring foreign trade, uncovering violations of EU market regulations, illegal technology exports, subsidy fraud in the agricultural sector, drug trafficking and money laundering. In response to the increasing violence against law enforcement officers, the customs SWAT team, the Central Customs Support Group (German: Zentrale Unterstützungsgruppe Zoll / ZUZ) was implemented in 1997 as the customs tactical unit for dangerous missions.

=== Parliamentary Police ===
The German parliament, the Bundestag, has its own small police force (German: Polizei beim Deutschen Bundestag, or simply Bundestagspolizei) of approximately 200 active officers.

=== Military police ===
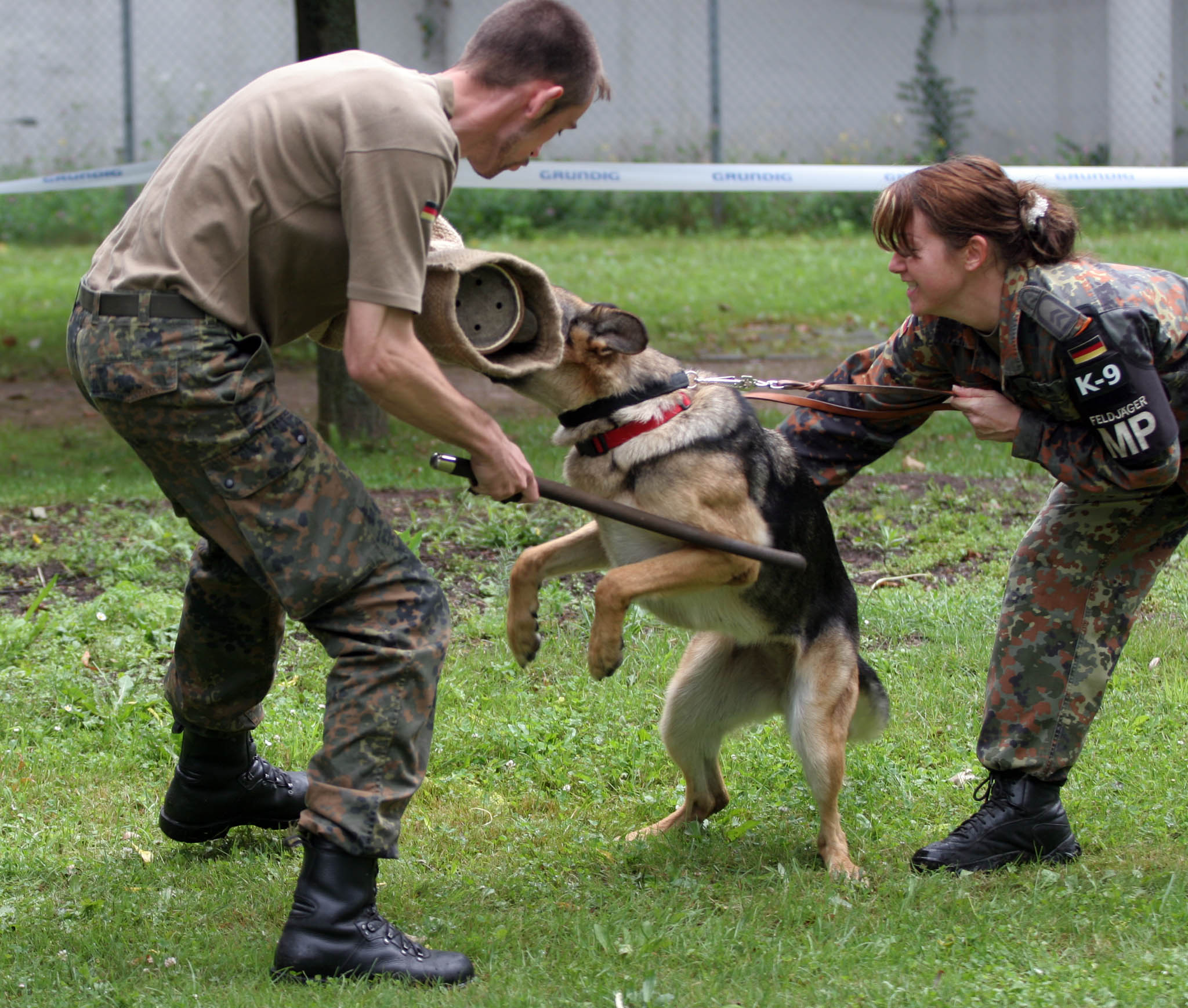
Military police in Germany

The Feldjäger are responsible for carrying out military law in Germany. It was re-established in October 1955. They have no power over civilians.

=== Intelligence Services ===
The two main federal intelligence services—the Federal Intelligence Service (German: Bundesnachrichtendienst / BND) for foreign intelligence and the Federal Office for the Protection of the Constitution (German: Bundesamt für Verfassungsschutz / BfV) for domestic intelligence—are no police forces and are constitutionally barred from having any respective powers (e.g., the authority to arrest) or equipment.

== State agencies ==
=== State Police Forces ===
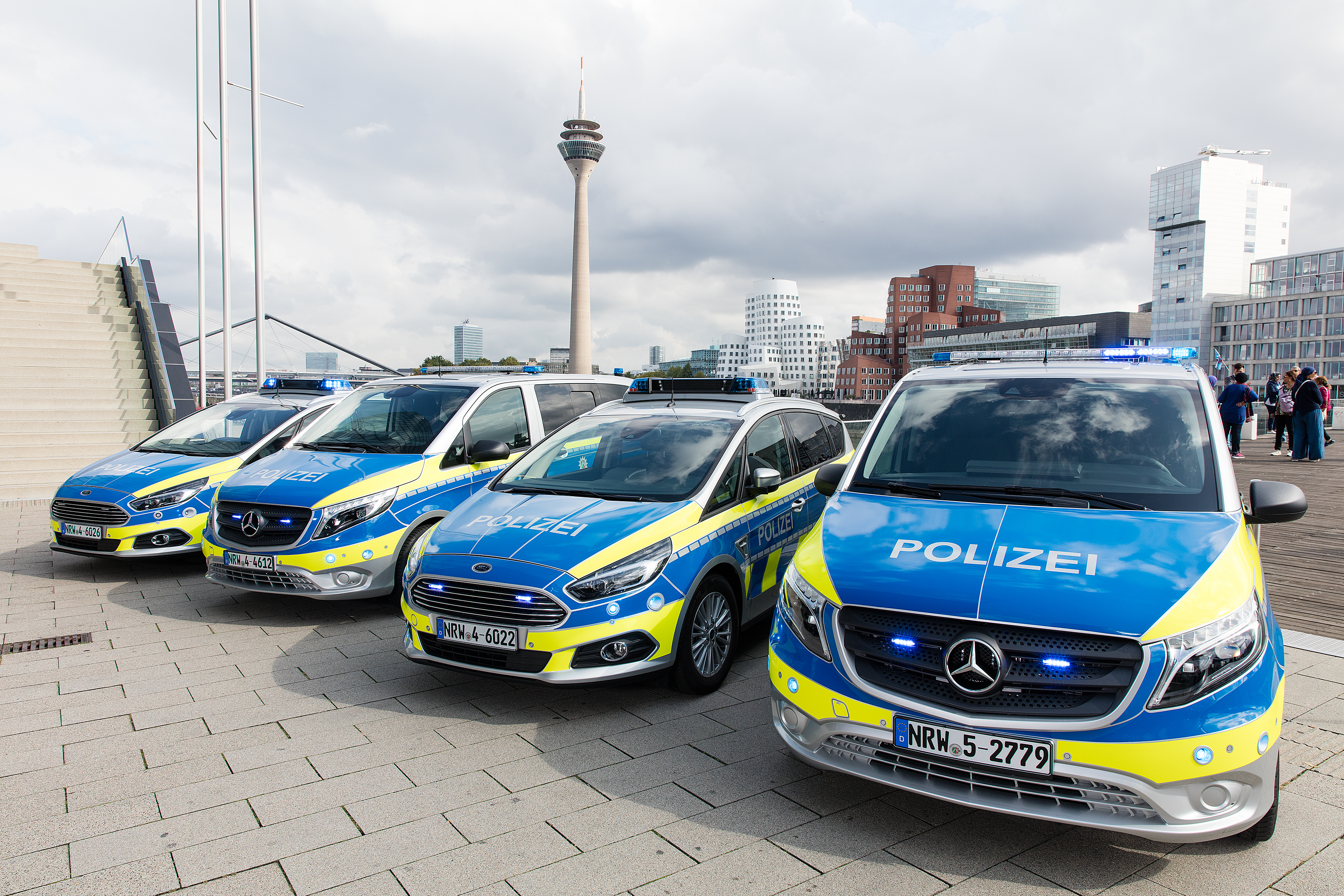
Patrol cars used by the Northrhine-Westphalian Police

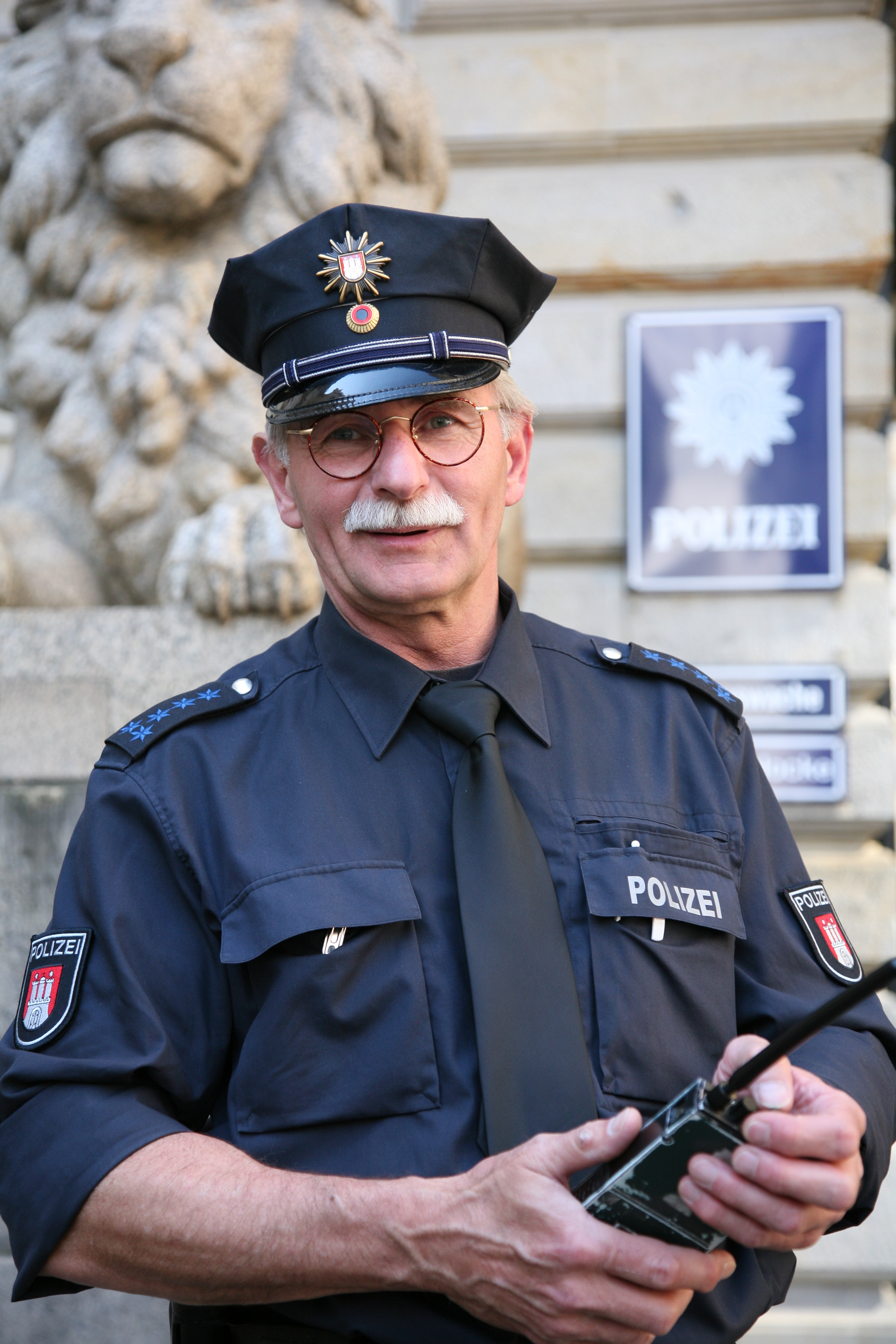
A senior police officer of the Hamburg Police

The German states are responsible for managing the bulk of Germany's police forces. Each state has its own police force known as the State Police (German: Landespolizei). Each state promulgates a law which lays down the organisation and duties of its police (Landespolizeigesetz or Sicherheits- und Ordnungsgesetz).

Although the state police forces are regulated by sixteen different legislatures and are, in fact, different police forces, there has been an increasing tendency toward standardization of police activities nationwide. Concerns about terrorism and the growth of organized crime have strengthened the movement to centralize police procedures and operations. The idea of creating one single police code for the whole of Germany (allgemeines Polizeigesetz) came up in the 1960s but never passed.

These forces are organized by cities, towns, or rural communities, but all are integral components of the police forces of the state in which they are located. The respective state minister of interior supervises police operations in his or her jurisdiction. Although the internal organizations differ somewhat, all state police are divided into the Protective Police (German: Schutzpolizei / SchuPo), a uniformed service carrying out routine law and order duties, and Criminal Police Office (German: Kriminalpolizei / almost always abbreviated with KriPo, see below), who carry out criminal investigations. The separate Administrative Police formerly had duties that included the registration of residents and the issuance of passports, identity cards, and various permits. These functions have been transferred to civil state government departments (Einwohnermeldeamt—Resident registration office) in all states.

The uniforms and vehicle colour schemes of the state police forces show slight differences, but are today all held in blue. The idea of using the same colour for police uniforms and vehicles throughout the European Union has been realized in all German state police forces and the federal police. All vehicle liveries and uniforms changed from white/green to silver/blue by 2018. The basic silver colour for vehicles in the most states, is actually increasing the resale value and thus lowers leasing costs. The uniforms already have been changed by all state police forces and the federal police from the green/beige version introduced in 1979 to blue ones. Hamburg was the first state to make the transition, Bavaria the last state, finishing the replacement of the green/beige uniforms in 2018.

==== Auxiliary State Police Forces ====
Some German states maintain auxiliary police forces under different denominations, depending on the state's legislation. In most auxiliary forces, the officers are armed with pepper spray, in some forces with the regular equipment of professional police officers. Some states maintain a "Voluntary Police Service" (German: Freiwilliger Polizeidienst) like Baden-Württemberg and Hesse, some a "Security Watch" (German: Sicherheitswacht), like Bavaria and Saxony, and only Brandenburg offers a "Security Partner" (German: Sicherheitspartner) program.

Their main duty is crime prevention by:

- conducting walking patrols to deter street crime
- patrolling near schools and kindergartens
- maintaining contact with potential victims of crime and juvenile delinquents.

Bavaria has instituted a system of citizen patrols (Sicherheitswacht) in which unarmed teams of two volunteers patrol assigned areas to improve subjective security. These teams carry a radio to call for help if necessary and a pepper spray for protection. A white armband with black letters identifying them as a "Security Watch" patrol.

Citizens in Baden-Württemberg can participate in the volunteer police programme, where roughly 1,200 citizens voluntarily assist their local police in 20 towns. These volunteers are specially trained, wear regular uniforms and are sworn and armed with normal police gear.

Citizens in Hesse and Saxony can also participate in a Volunteer Police program, where some citizens voluntarily assist their local police. The volunteers are trained for 50 hours in Hesse and 60 hours in Saxony, receive uniforms, pepper spray and a mobile phone in Hesse and a radio in Saxony.

In Brandenburg there were established about 200 security partners along the Polish border as well as around Greater Berlin. The legal basis is a decree of the State Minister of the Interior of 11 October 1995.

People can also join on a full-time basis the Wachpolizei, which has less authority (and less pay) than regular police officers to perform basic police tasks, like the guarding of premisses like an embassy, to release regular officers for patrol work.

=== State Criminal Investigation Office ===
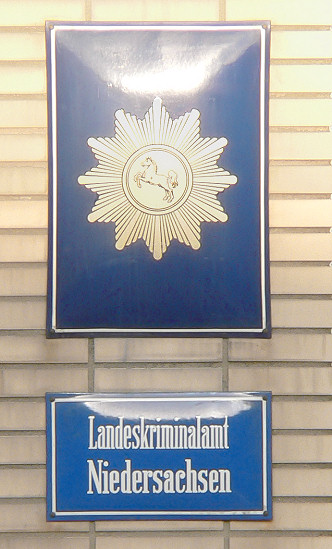
Doorplate of the Landeskriminalamt of the state of Lower Saxony

The State Criminal Police Office (German: Landeskriminalamt / LKA), is an independent law enforcement agency in most German states, that is directly subordinated to the respective state ministry of the interior. The LKA supervises police operations aimed at preventing and investigating criminal offences and coordinates investigations of serious crime, involving more than one regional headquarter. They can take over investigative responsibility in cases of serious crime, e.g. drug trafficking, organized crime, environmental and white-collar crime or extremist and terrorist offences. Each Landeskriminalamt is also a modern central office for information, analyzing police intelligence from home and abroad and transmitting it to police stations. It collates data on criminal offences and offenders in crime statistics that are used as a basis for new strategies, policy decisions and legislative initiatives. It also analyzes certain offense areas, evaluates the police measures executed in each case, forecasts expected tendencies and describes events in annual reports.

=== State Offices for the Protection of the Constitution ===
The State Office for the Protection of the Constitution (German: Landesamt für Verfassungsschutz / lfV) in every single state, is the domestic intelligence service, concerned with espionage, treason, and sedition. Due to the negative experiences of abusing power in Nazi-Germany, the domestic intelligence duties are not centralized and therefore maintained by the states. As with the federal BfV, the LfV have no powers of arrest and cannot use force, but it carries out surveillance and supplies police agencies with information on extremist parties, international crime, drug trafficking, terrorism, and other illegal activities.

== Local agencies ==
=== Municipal order enforcement agencies ===
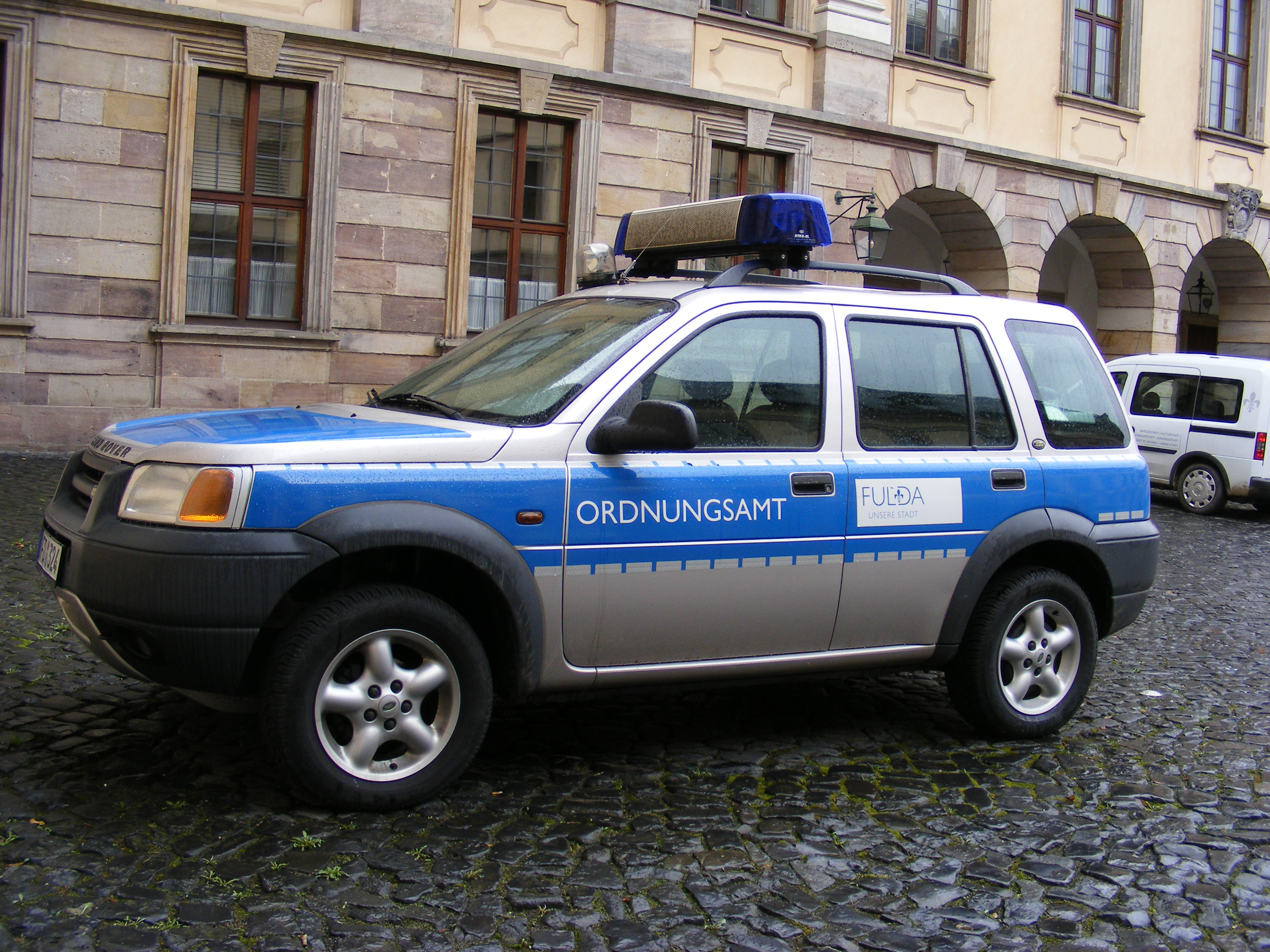
Patrol car of the Ordnungsamt of the city of Fulda

In Germany municipal code enforcement is organized very heterogeneously, depending on state, county and municipal regulations. Currently, many cities in Germany maintain local order enforcement agencies, with limited police-type duties. Those bylaw enforcement officers in general are city employees. Contingent on the respective unit, the officers wear - usually police like - uniforms or wear plain clothes with an armband or a labeled jacket, they could be armed or unarmed. The order enforcement officers are the municipal administration's "eyes and ears on the street". Mostly they are charged with monitoring municipal by-laws and laws that fall under the responsibility of municipalities, which include monitoring the conduct of shop owners, sanitation inspections, veterinary inspections and minor infractions and misdemeanors such as illegal parking, littering, state and local dog regulations etc. They usually only hand out warnings and fines and can only perform a citizen's arrest as any other citizen can. If they see any major crimes they are required to call the state police for a criminal investigation, while they can intervene in ongoing crimes themselves.

Even the denominations are manifold, depending on local regulations as well, most of the time the denominations are:

- Municipal Code Enforcement Service (Gemeindevollzugsdienst / GVD)
- Community Enforcement Service (Kommunaler Ordnungsdienst / KOD)
- Order Enforcement Office (Ordnungsamt / OA), most common denomination
- Municipal Enforcement Service (Städtischer Ordnungsdienst)
- Municipal Guard / Municipal Watch (Stadtwacht)

=== Municipal police forces ===
In Baden-Württemberg municipal police officers do have the same rights, powers and obligations like the counterparts of the state police. The tasks of a municipal police force depend on the size of the municipality's territory and the number of inhabitants in which it is operating. The "police authority" (German: Polizeibehörde) of a town or city can transfer more tasks and responsibilities to its police force, only if approved by the regional government of the state (German: Regierungspräsidium).

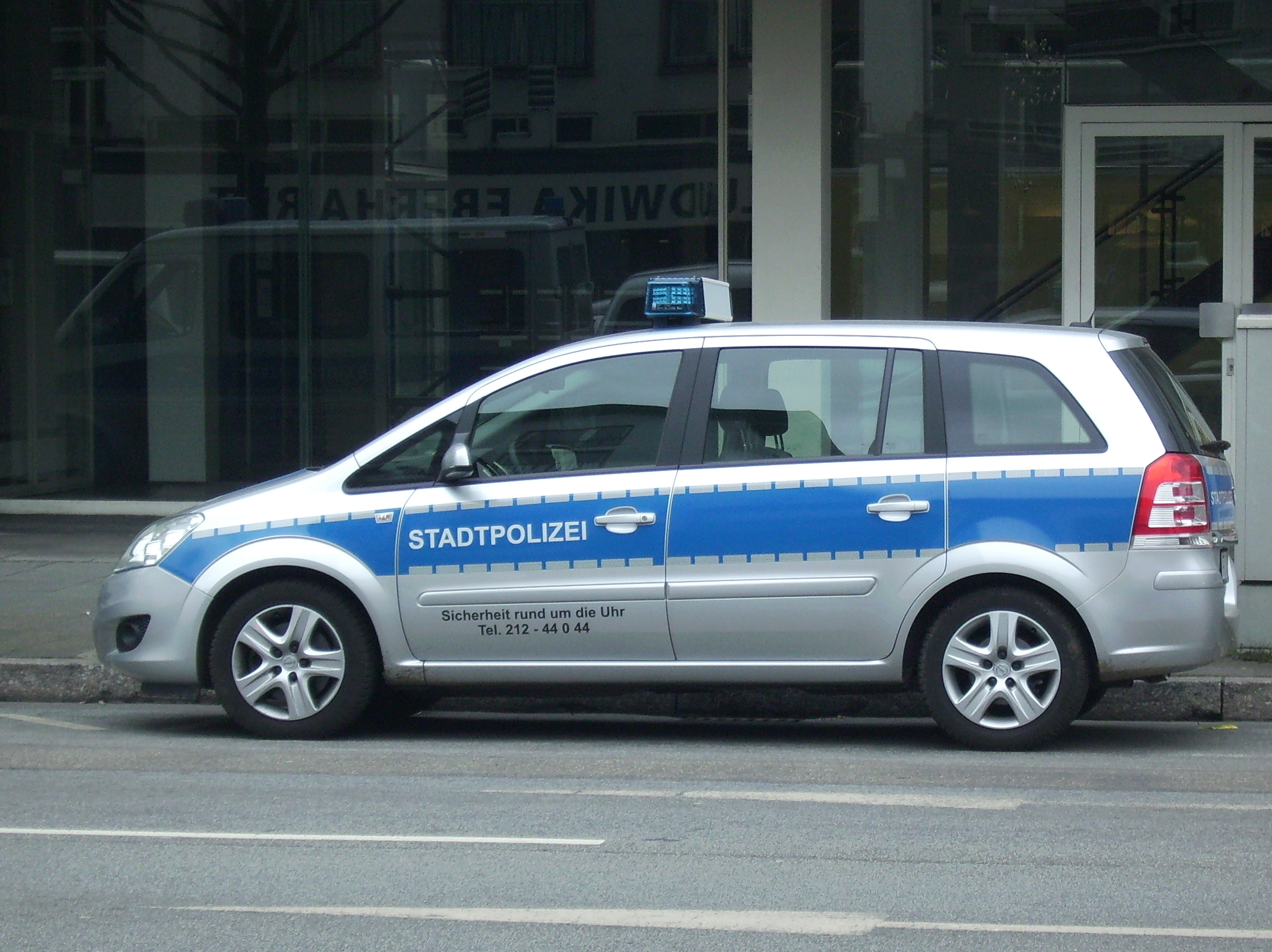
Car of the Stadtpolizei in Frankfurt

In the state of Hesse, city police forces provide the local order enforcement. The officers wear police uniforms and are armed. Similar to the municipal order enforcement units, there are different denominations:

- City Police (Stadtpolizei)
- Community Police (Kommunalpolizei)

== Training ==
Police training is primarily the responsibility of the individual states, although the federal government provides assistance and coordination. The high level of police professionalism is attributed in large degree to the length and thoroughness of training. The situation is different in the five new states of eastern Germany. Long accustomed to a society made compliant by eliminating opposing opinions, police forces of the eastern states have to adapt to the growing numbers of opposing right-wing groups and factions.

Most police recruits spend about two and a half years in the regular police academy training (Mittlerer Polizeivollzugsdienst). The auxiliary police forces, with fewer powers and often not equipped with a duty-weapon, are trained in just 12 weeks. In case of higher education (Abitur), recruits can also start off at a higher rank, comparable to Lieutenant (Rank: Polizei-/Kriminalkommissar), which they have to attend police college for and acquire a bachelor's degree.

After about six years of duty as a patrol officer, an individual with an outstanding record who does well on a highly competitive examination and started off in the regular police academy (mittlerer Polizeivollzugsdienst) can go on to two or three years at a higher police school or a college of public administration to qualify for a bachelor's degree (Aufstieg in den gehobenen Polizeivollzugsdienst). The very few candidates who qualify for the highest ranks of the police study for one year at the Federal Police Leadership Academy in Münster-Hiltrup.

== Off duty carry ==
Depending on the certain state police regulation, German police officers may be authorized to carry their department-issued firearms while off duty. Some states allow their officers to apply for the approval to purchase a private firearm, that can be carried off-duty. Further restrictions that forbid off-duty carry exist (i.e. when drinking alcohol, at public events). In their private properties, the officers are required to have a safe to store their gun while not carrying it.

== Women in the Police ==
The state police forces have had female members since the implementation of the several police forces after World War II. Initially, female officers were assigned to cases involving juveniles and women, working in plainclothes without weapons. Since the mid-1970s, female police officers have performed general police patrol duties and their proportion of total police officers is steadily rising. However, their representation in leadership positions is still relatively low.

== Alert Police ==
The Alert Police (German: Bereitschaftspolizei / BePo), literally "Readiness or Standby Police" is available in each state for riot control, although their primary function is training police recruits. In this tasks it is comparable with Anti-Riot Police Forces in other countries. Beside this, the Federal Police maintains a Bereitschaftspolizei as well, to assist the state police forces if necessary. While the states are free to choose the equipment and to organize their police forces autonomously, the state and federal alert police units jointly procure standardized weapons, vehicles, anti-riot gears and communications equipment through the federal government. Through a Contract between States and the Federal Government an office in the Federal Ministry of Interior monitors and coordinates the deployment of the BePo units, which can be called upon to assist the police of other states in case of riots or other civil unrest.

The Alert Police is assigned to barracks where they are organized along military lines into squads, platoons, and 120- to 150-member training or standby companies. In most states, the BePo contingents consists of one 600- to 800-member battalion, but in six of the larger states they are organized into regiments.

Duties vary according to local requirements. In Hamburg, for example, the BePo patrol the subway system, assist in police raids in the red-light district, and are present at large demonstrations and soccer matches. Their units are equipped with their own transport, tents, and rations, enabling them to be shifted quickly to other Länder without having to rely on outside support. The Readiness Police have water cannons and armoured vehicles but are armed with lighter weapons than those of the federal police.

All state alert police forces and the federal alert police force maintain specialized units as well, the so-called Arrest Units (German: Beweissicherungs- und Festnahmeeinheiten, lit. "Units for arrests and securing evidence", abbreviated BFE). The BFE units were established in 1987 after two police officers were killed during demonstrations against the expansion of Frankfurt Airport.

As a reaction to several terrorist attacks in Europe since 2015, an additional unit, the BFE+, was implemented in summer 2015. The BFE+ should provide specialized operators for long lasting (search) operations for example after a terrorist attack.

== Career brackets ==
German law enforcement authorities have personnel of three available career brackets, the lowest being the "Mittlerer Dienst" ("middle service"), followed by the so-called "gehobener Dienst" ("elevated service") and the "Höherer Dienst" ("higher service"). Only the Federal Customs Administration (Bundeszollverwaltung) and the Departments of Justice and Corrections of the states (Justizvollzugsdienst—Justice Enforcement Service) still have personnel of the very lowest career bracket "Einfacher Dienst" ("simple service"). To understand this structure it may be helpful to compare it with military rank structures because decades ago it was really similar.

=== Development of career ===
Today nine of sixteen State Police Forces recruit only for the career bracket of the "gehobener Dienst".

Entry into "Mittlerer Dienst" requires successful completion of 10 years of schooling, or a successful training in any other job and some years of working in this job. Period of training is 2 years at the police academy starting with the rank of Polizeimeister-Anwärter. The highest possible rank in this bracket is that of Polizeihauptmeister mit Zulage. In the mid to late seventies the "mittlerer Dienst" was disestablished for the detective branch Kriminalpolizei, but in some states of the former GDR, they still exist. Rank designation, in this case, f.e. Kriminalhauptmeister.

Entry into the "gehobener Dienst" requires a high-school diploma and period of training is 3 years at a college of administration and justice. The highest possible rank in this career is that of Erster Polizei-/Kriminal-hauptkommissar.

The third career bracket is the so-called "höherer Dienst". A direct entry into this career bracket is possible and requires a law degree of a university, but the majority of these officers had started their career in "mittlerer" or "gehobener Dienst". The period of training is 2 years at the Deutsche Hochschule der Polizei or German Police University. That is the only official centralised educational institution of the German police. Starting at the rank of "Polizeirat" or "Kriminalrat" (literally "police counsellor" or "detective counsellor") up to "Polizeipräsident" ("police president"), which is (in most German states) equivalent to the rank of Chief of Police in the USA.

== Judiciary ==
The German legal system is a civil law mostly based on a comprehensive compendium of statutes, as compared to the common law systems. The Bundesverfassungsgericht (Federal Constitutional Court, being located in the city of Karlsruhe) is the German supreme court responsible for constitutional matters, with power of judicial review. Germany's supreme court system, called Oberste Gerichtshöfe des Bundes ("Supreme Federal Courts of Justice"), is specialised: for civil and criminal cases, the highest court of appeal is the inquisitorial Federal Court of Justice ("Bundesgerichtshof" in Karlsruhe) and for other affairs the courts are the Federal Labour Court ("Bundesarbeitsgericht" in Erfurt), the Federal Social Court ("Bundessozialgericht" in Kassel), the Federal Fiscal Court ("Bundesfinanzhof" in Munich) and the Federal Administrative Court ("Bundesverwaltungsgericht" in Leipzig). The Völkerstrafgesetzbuch (International Penal Law Code) regulates the consequences of crimes against humanity, genocide and war crimes, and gives German courts universal jurisdiction under specific circumstances.

Criminal and private laws are codified on the national level in the Strafgesetzbuch (literally Penal Law Book) and the Bürgerliches Gesetzbuch (literally Civil Law Book) respectively. The German penal system is aimed towards rehabilitation of the criminal and the protection of the general public. Except for petty crimes, which are tried before a single professional judge, and serious political crimes, all charges are tried before mixed tribunals on which lay judges (Schöffen or assessors) sit side by side with professional judges.

== Equipment ==
=== Vehicles ===
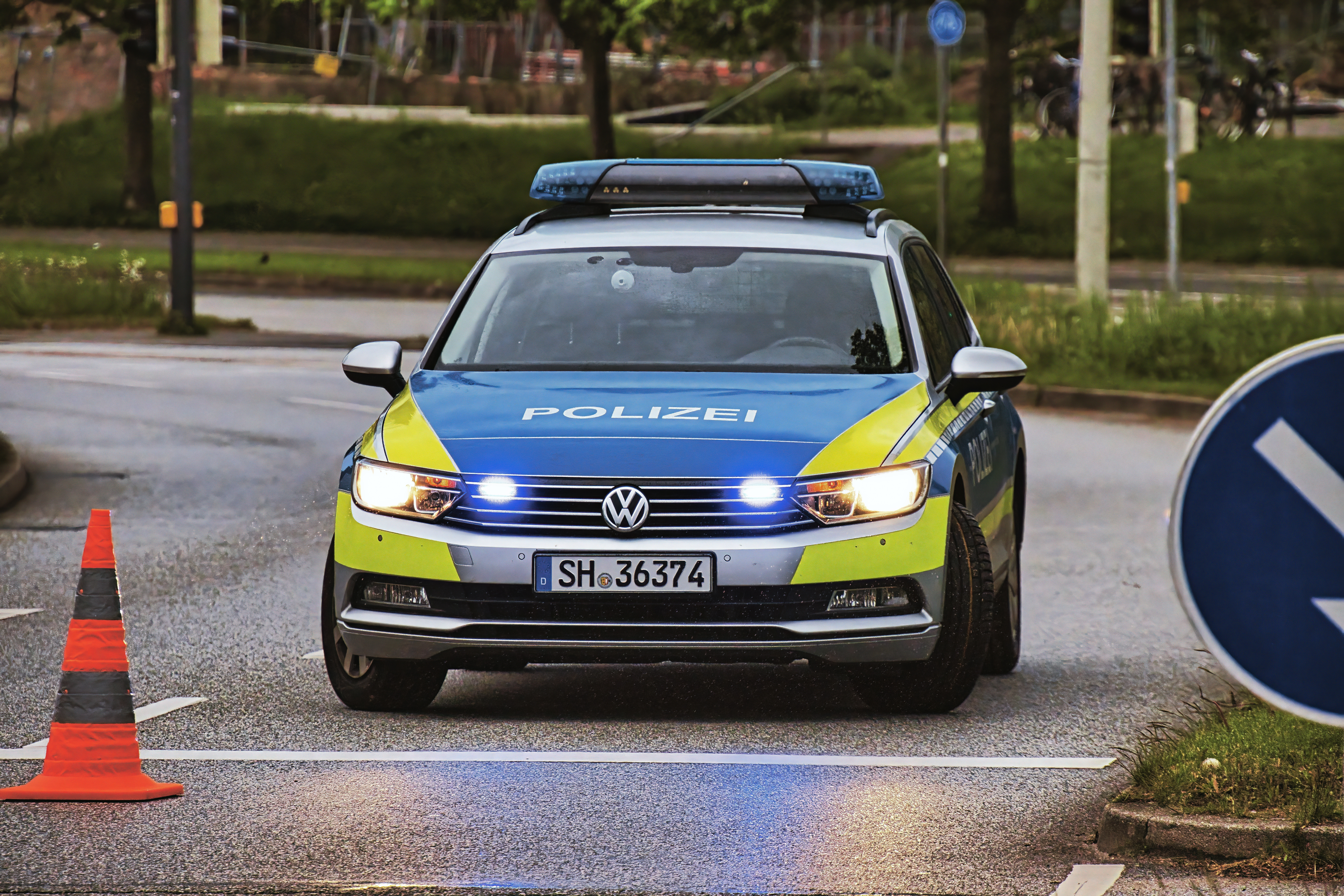
A patrolcar of the Schleswig-Holstein Police, bearing neon reflective surfaces

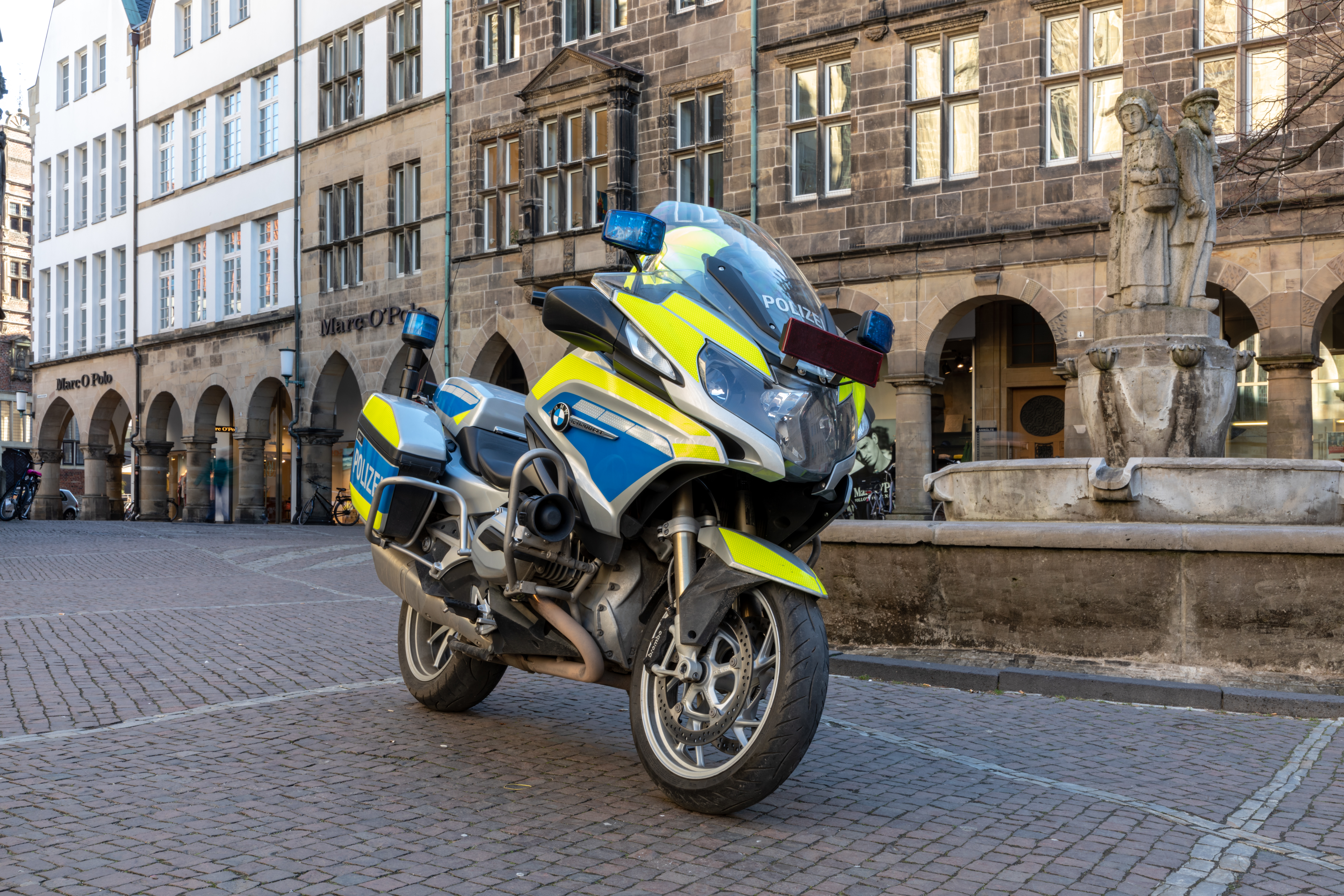
A Police motorcycle used by the North Rhine-Westphalia Police

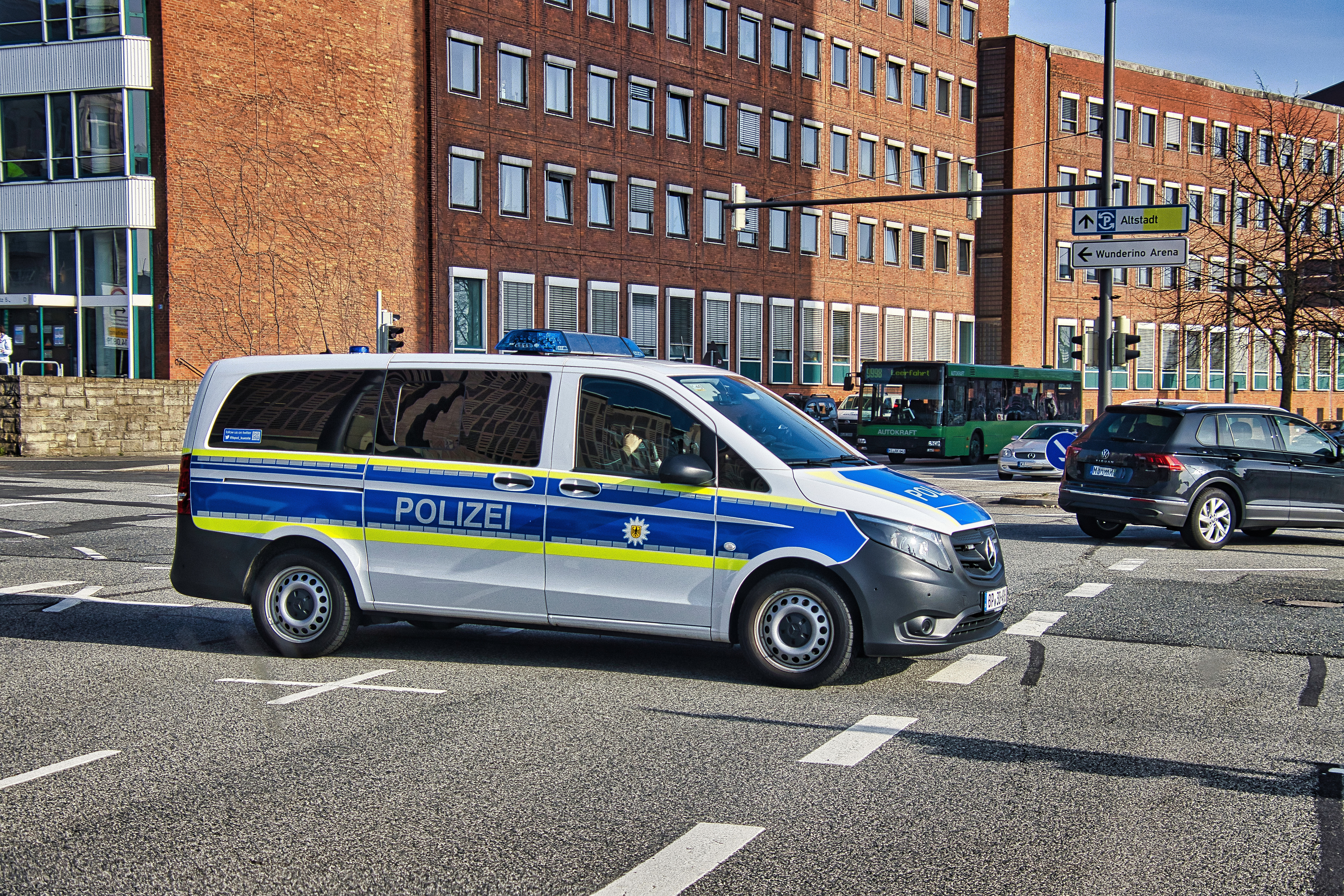
Federal Police patrol car in Kiel

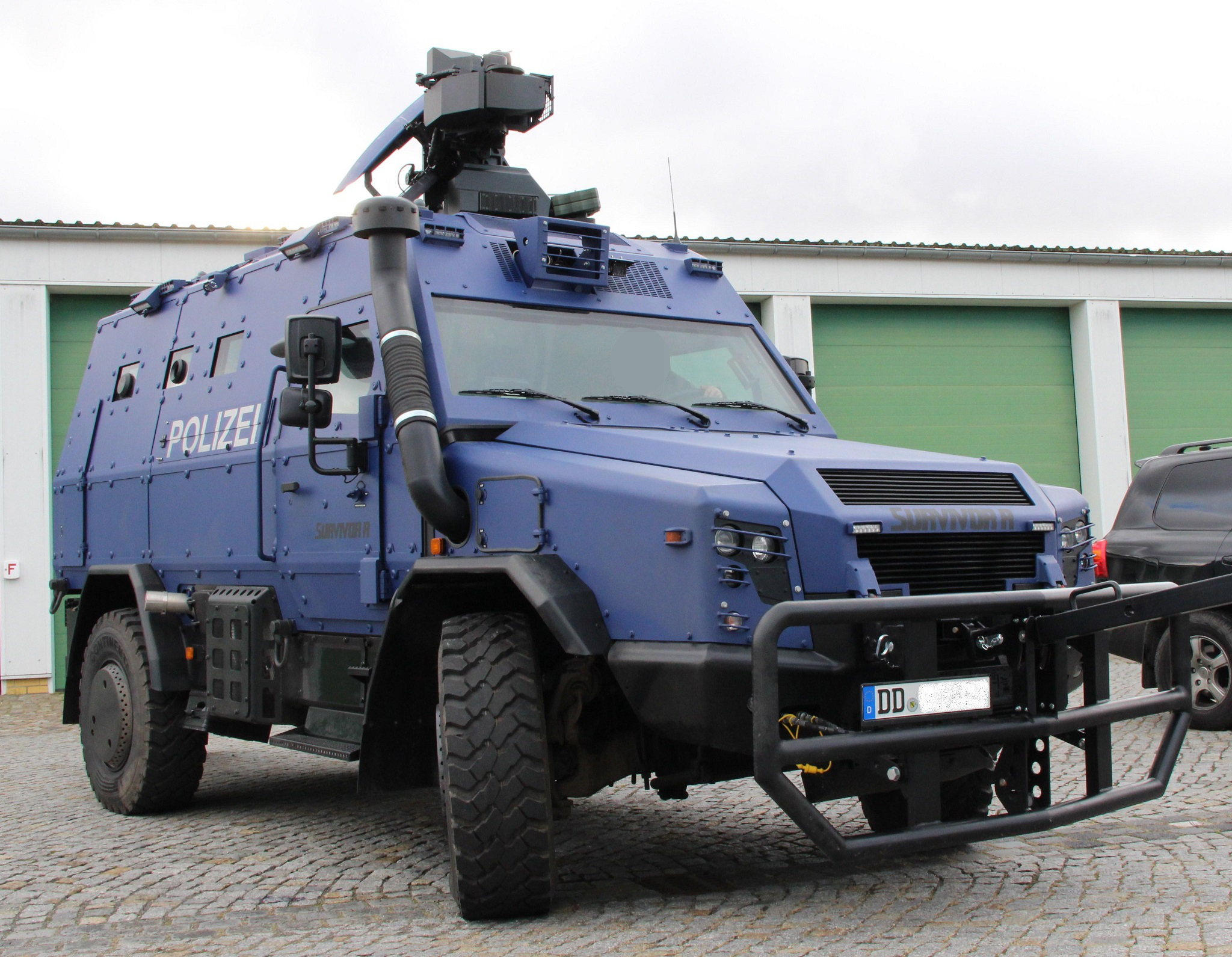
Sonderwagen 5 of the Saxony State Police

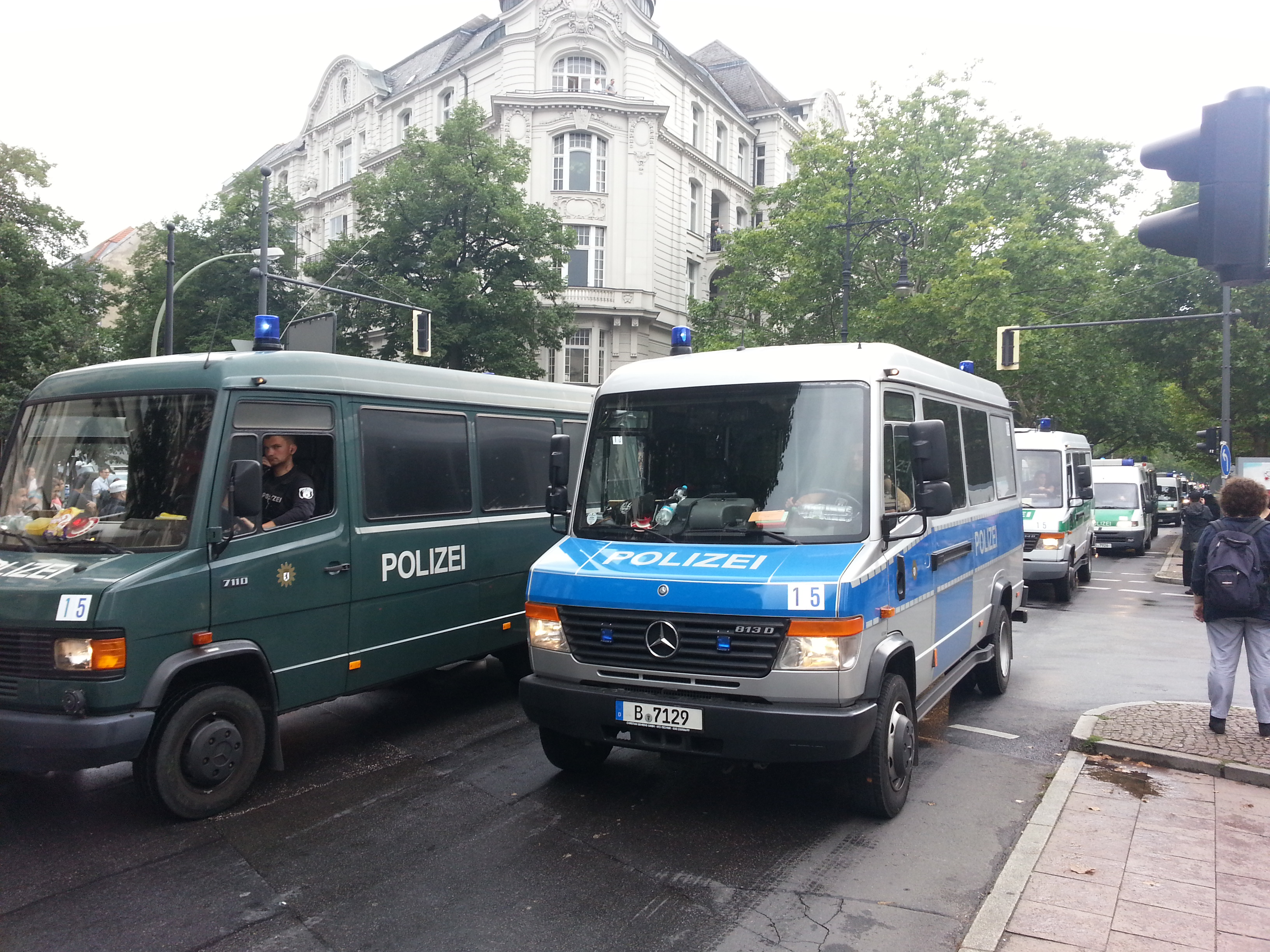
Mercedes Benz police van in Berlin, nicknamed "Wanne" ("Bathtub") in outdated green livery

German police typically use cars from German manufacturers. Mercedes-Benz, Volkswagen, Audi, Opel and BMW are commonly used as patrol cars (Streifenwagen). States used to prefer vehicles built in or close to the respective state. However, with most states now leasing instead of buying their vehicles and in light of European Union rules on contract bidding, states have less latitude in choosing which manufacturer will provide their patrol cars than they did.

In the Saarland which is historically closely tied to neighboring France, vehicles from French companies as well as European Fords are used as police cars. The Bavarian State Police uses mainly BMW and Audi vehicles, as both companies are based in Bavaria (BMW in Munich and Audi in Ingolstadt). In the eastern states of Germany, mostly Volkswagens are in use (Volkswagen is based in Wolfsburg, close to the eastern states). The Hessian police prefer Opel cars (the Opel brand formerly belonged to General Motors, currently it is owned by PSA, which is a part of Stellantis) is based in Rüsselsheim near Frankfurt am Main in Hesse). Baden-Württemberg mostly uses Mercedes-Benz and Volkswagen cars for their police force.

Before the police reform in the mid-1970s, Germany had many city police forces and each had its own police car livery. Dark blue, dark green and white were popular colours. However, the dark colours were perceived as a disadvantage as many accidents occurred at night during high-speed chases. Therefore, the conference of interior ministers decided on standardising police car liveries so that the cars appeared non-threatening and could be easily visible at night. Bright green and white became the colours associated with police vehicles in Germany beginning in the 1970s. More recently, police forces changed to silver cars and vans instead of white ones as they were easier to sell than the white ones when their police service was over. In an effort to harmonize the coloring of police in Europe, Germany has adopted a blue-silver livery with the addition of neon reflective surfaces to increase visibility.

Today, German police forces generally lease patrol cars from a manufacturer, usually for a period of three years. The leasing company marks the patrol cars using plastic foils with reflecting strips as borders instead of painting them. The foils are removed when the cars are sold to the public as standard silver used cars when the lease runs out.

Unlike in other countries like the United States, police cars in Germany rarely come with any special equipment (apart from the obvious, like flashing lights or sirens) not available to other users of the same model, as the cars on sale in European markets are generally considered to be fit for police duty without any further alteration.

=== Type of vehicles ===
These vehicles are used by law enforcement agencies in Germany:

- Audi A4
- Audi A4 Avant
- Audi A6
- Audi A6 Avant
- Audi R8
- BMW E60
- BMW E61
- BMW F11
- BMW E90
- BMW E91
- BMW F31
- BMW F46
- Fiat Ducato
- Ford Mondeo
- Ford Transit
- Iveco trucks
- Setra prison buses
- Land Rover Discovery
- Magirus Deutz trucks
- MAN trucks and prison buses
- Mercedes-Benz many trucks and vans
- Mercedes-Benz C-Class
- Mercedes-Benz E-Class
- Mercedes-Benz G-Class
- Mercedes-Benz S-Class
- Mercedes-Benz Sprinter
- Mercedes-Benz Unimog
- Mercedes-Benz Vito
- Mini Cooper
- Neoplan prison buses
- Opel Astra
- Opel Astra Caravan
- Opel Corsa
- Opel Insignia Sports Tourer
- Porsche 911
- Sonderwagen ~'Specialwagon', light armored vehicles
- Volkswagen Beetle
- Volkswagen Caddy
- Volkswagen Golf
- Volkswagen Jetta
- Volkswagen LT
- Volkswagen Passat
- Volkswagen Passat Variant
- Volkswagen Polo
- Volkswagen Scirocco
- Volkswagen Sharan
- Volkswagen Transporter (T4)
- Volkswagen Transporter (T5)
- Volkswagen Touran
- Volvo V90

=== Uniforms ===
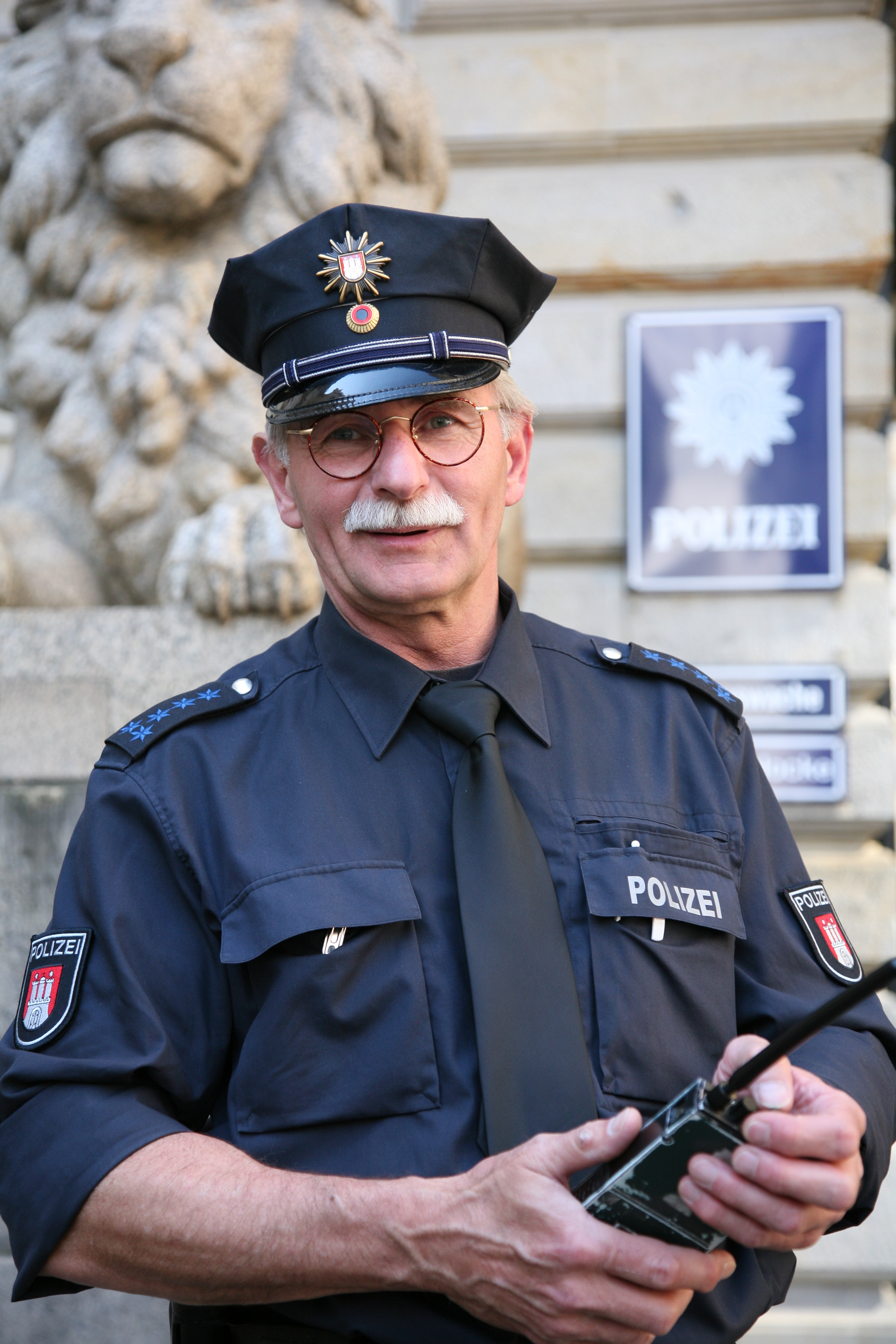
Hamburg uniform type

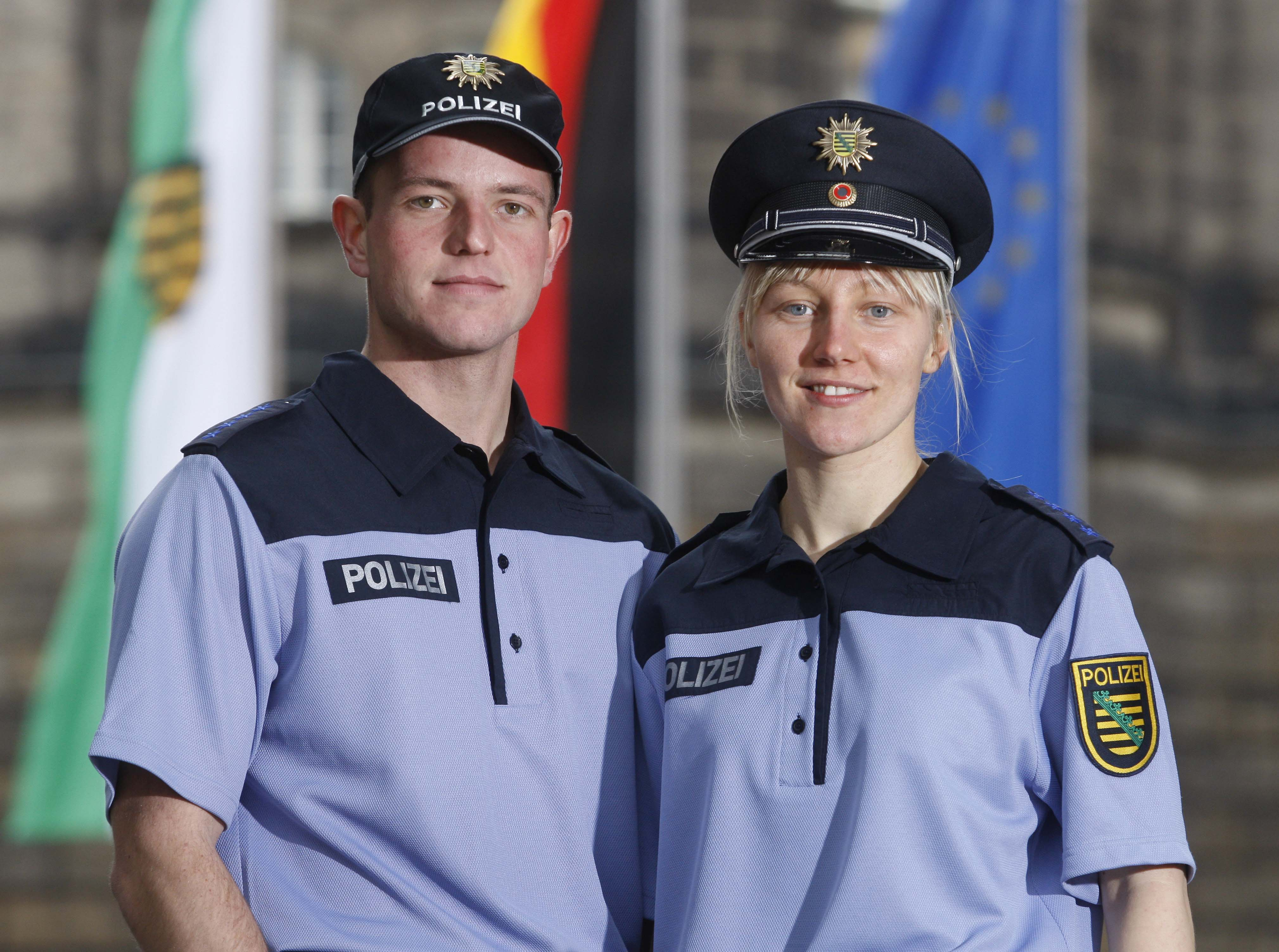
Saxony uniform type

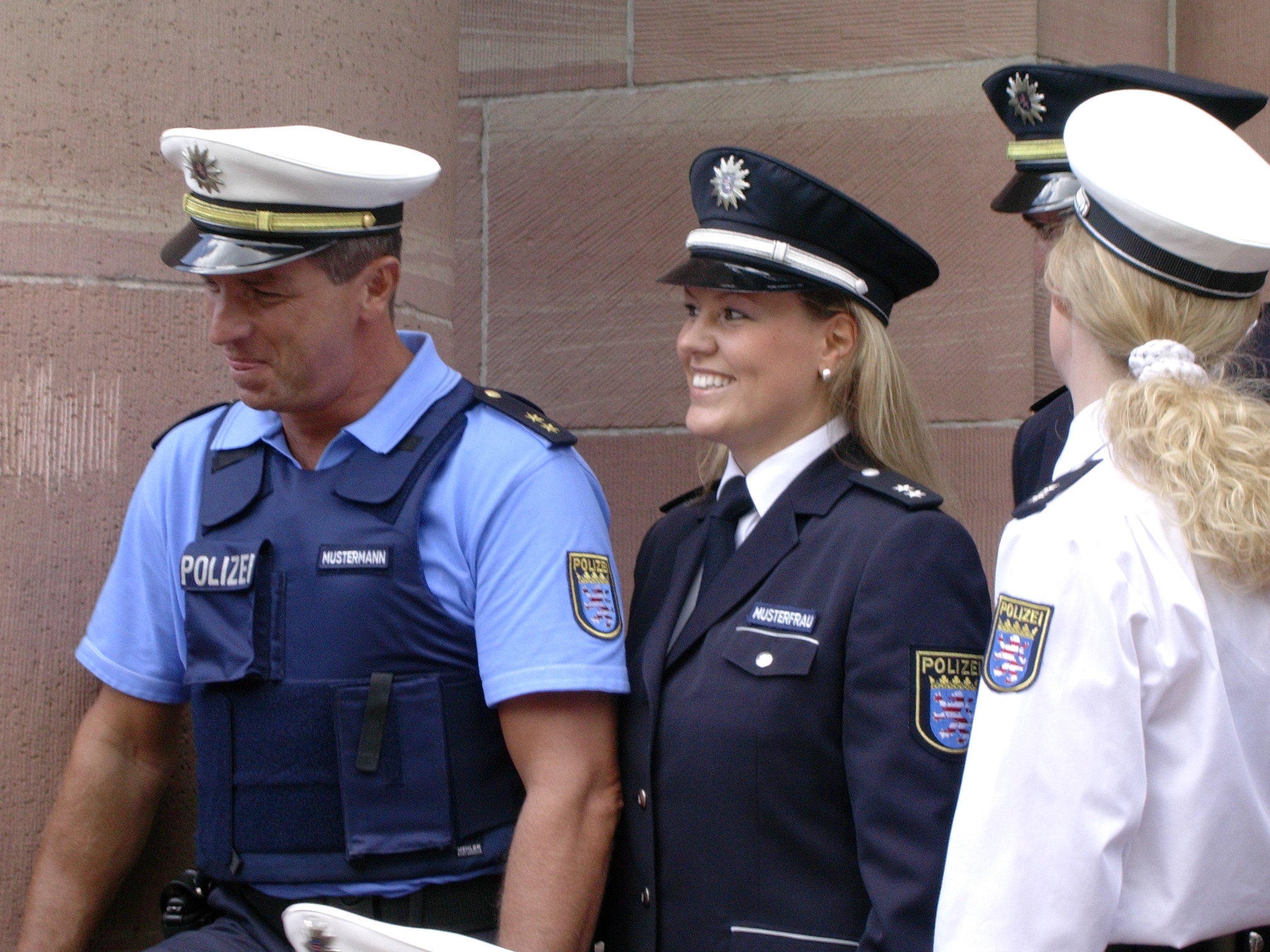
Hesse uniform type

==== History ====
From 1945 onwards, due to the multilayer organisation in municipal and rural state law enforcement agencies, Nazi Police forces wore completely different colored uniforms. In the mid-seventies the aftermath of Munich massacre a reorganisation of the state police forces took place. This opportunity was taken to implement a standard police uniform for all West German states and West Berlin. All state police forces implemented the same green and beige uniform, most parts designed by Heinz Oestergaard. The standard uniform consisted of a tunic, parka, pullover without shroud, coat, visor cap and necktie in moss-green, trouser, pullover and cardigan in brown-beige, shirt (long and short sleeve) in bamboo-yellow. Shoes, boots, holsters, leather jackets and other leather gear were black. Leather gloves were olive-drab. There were some exceptions. Visor caps with a white top were worn by the traffic police and by the Schutzpolizei during traffic regulation duties.

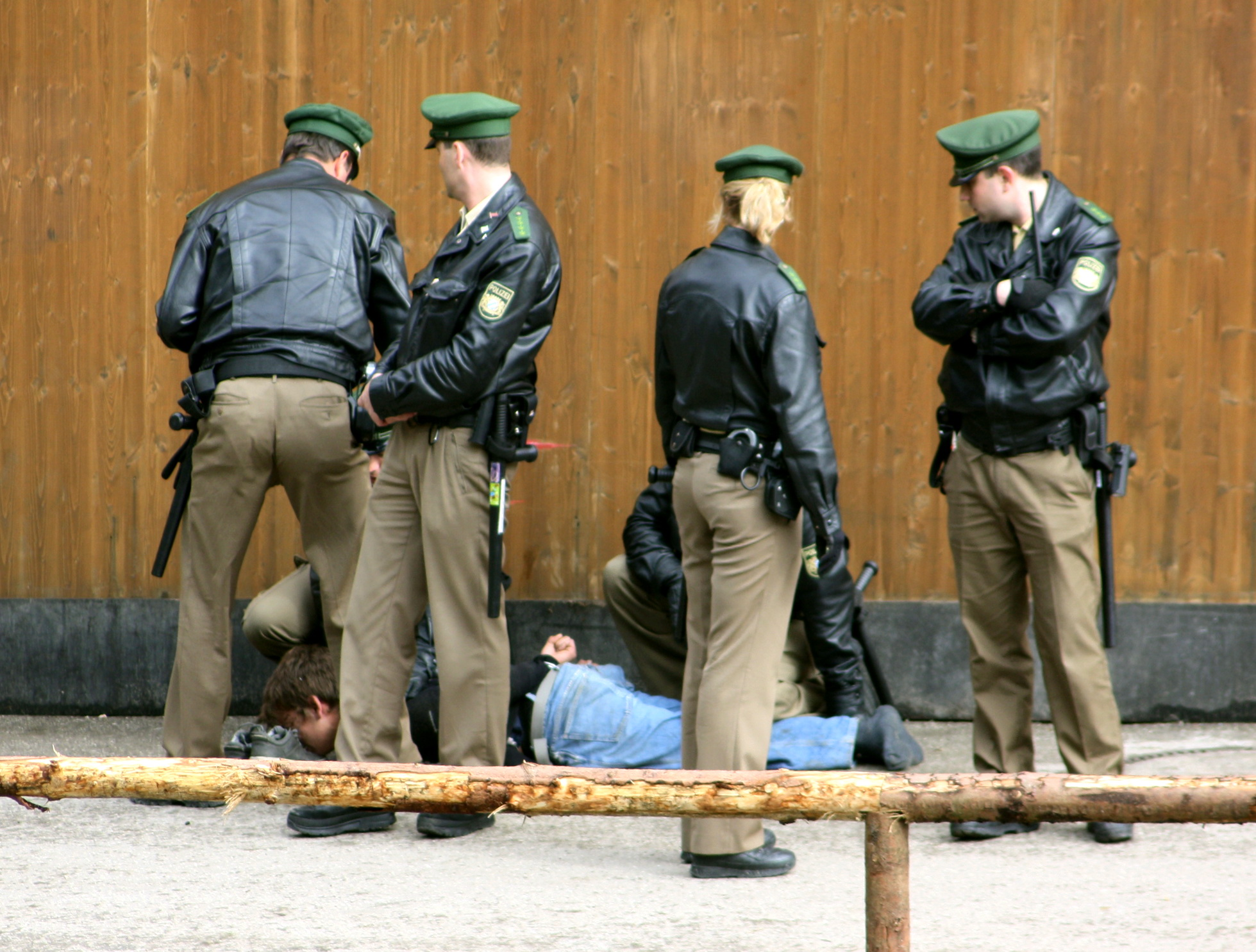
The old beige uniform worn in Bavaria until 2018

The state river or water police forces (German: Wasserschutzpolizei) wore uniforms of a completely different design. The basic uniform was navy-blue, the shirt was white and the visor cap had a white top. The BGS wore an all forest green uniform with a bamboo-yellow shirt. After German Reunification the Volkspolizei was broken up into Landespolizei and switched to the standard uniform. During the period of transition, they still wore their old uniforms but with Western-style sleeve and cap ensigns.

==== Transition to blue uniforms of state and federal police units ====
Like most European countries have blue police uniforms, all German State Police Forces (German: Landespolizei) and the Federal Police (German: Bundespolizei) have shifted to blue uniforms to conform with the common blue image of most police forces in Europe. In line with the uniforms, police vehicles and various items of equipment also changed the color to blue. Although there are 16 states, currently only six types of state police uniforms are in use, because many states co-operate in the design and sourcing of the police uniforms.

State level

State Police Force	Police uniform type	Launched in	Conversion finished in	Conversion to blue patrol cars
Baden-Württemberg State Police	Baden-Württemberg	2010	2011	2008
Bavarian State Police	Bavaria: a modification of the Austrian federal police uniform	2016	2018	2016
Berlin State Police	Brandenburg	2010	2013	2010
Brandenburg State Police	Brandenburg	2008	2010	2005
Bremen State Police	Hamburg	2006	2010	2006
Hamburg State Police	Hamburg	2005	2005	2002
Hesse State Police	Hesse	2008	2008	2005
Lower Saxony State Police	Hamburg	2006	2008	2004
Mecklenburg-Vorpommern State Police	Hamburg	2009	2011	2009
North Rhine-Westphalia State Police	North Rhine-Westphalia	2007	2012	2007
Rhineland-Palatinate State Police	Hesse	2008	2012	2006
Saarland State Police	Hesse	2015	2016	2015
Saxony State Police	Brandenburg	2009	2012	2008
Saxony-Anhalt State Police	mixed uniform type of Brandenburg and Hesse uniform types	2009	2012	2006
Schleswig-Holstein State Police	Hamburg	2006	2008	2005
Thuringia State Police (until 2020)	Hesse (until 2020)	2009	2011	2006
Thüringen State Police (since 2020)	Hamburg (since 2020)	2020	ongoing	2006

Federal level

Federal Police Force	Police uniform type	Launched in	Conversion finished in	Conversion to blue patrol cars
Federal Parliament Police	Federal Police	2018	2018	-
Federal Police	Federal Police	2005	2012	2005

== See also ==
- List of law enforcement agencies in Germany
- Police forces of Nazi Germany
- Police of Germany
- Zollkriminalamt (German Customs Investigation Bureau)
- Staatsanwaltschaft (public prosecutor's office)
- Crime in Germany
- Prisons in Germany
- List of killings by law enforcement officers in Germany
  - List of killings by law enforcement officers in pre-reunification Germany
  - List of killings by law enforcement officers in post-reunification Germany
- Legal aid in Germany
