= Police of Germany =

The Police of Germany may refer to one of a number of German law enforcement agencies.

For an overview look at:

Law enforcement in Germany

== Federal ==
- The Federal Police (Bundespolizei or BPOL), subordinate to the Federal Ministry of the Interior
- The Federal Criminal Police Office (Bundeskriminalamt)
- The German Parliament Police (Bundestagspolizei)
- The German Federal Coast Guard (Küstenwache des Bundes)
- The German Customs Investigation Bureau (Zollkriminalamt, ZKA)
- The Military Police Feldjäger of the German armed forces Bundeswehr

== State police ==
- The state police forces (Landespolizeien), subordinated to the Ministry of the Interior of the particular German state:
  - Baden-Württemberg State Police
  - Bavarian State Police
  - Berlin State Police
  - Brandenburg State Police
  - Bremen State Police
  - Hamburg State Police
  - Hesse State Police
  - Lower Saxony State Police
  - Mecklenburg-Vorpommern State Police
  - North Rhine-Westphalia State Police
  - Rhineland-Palatinate State Police
  - Saarland State Police
  - Saxony State Police
  - Saxony-Anhalt State Police
  - Schleswig-Holstein State Police
  - Thuringia State Police
