= Zuz =

Zuz or ZUZ may refer to:

- Zuz (Jewish coin), an ancient Hebrew silver coin
- Zentrale Unterstützungsgruppe Zoll, the police tactical unit of the German Customs Service
