= Zollfahndungsamt =

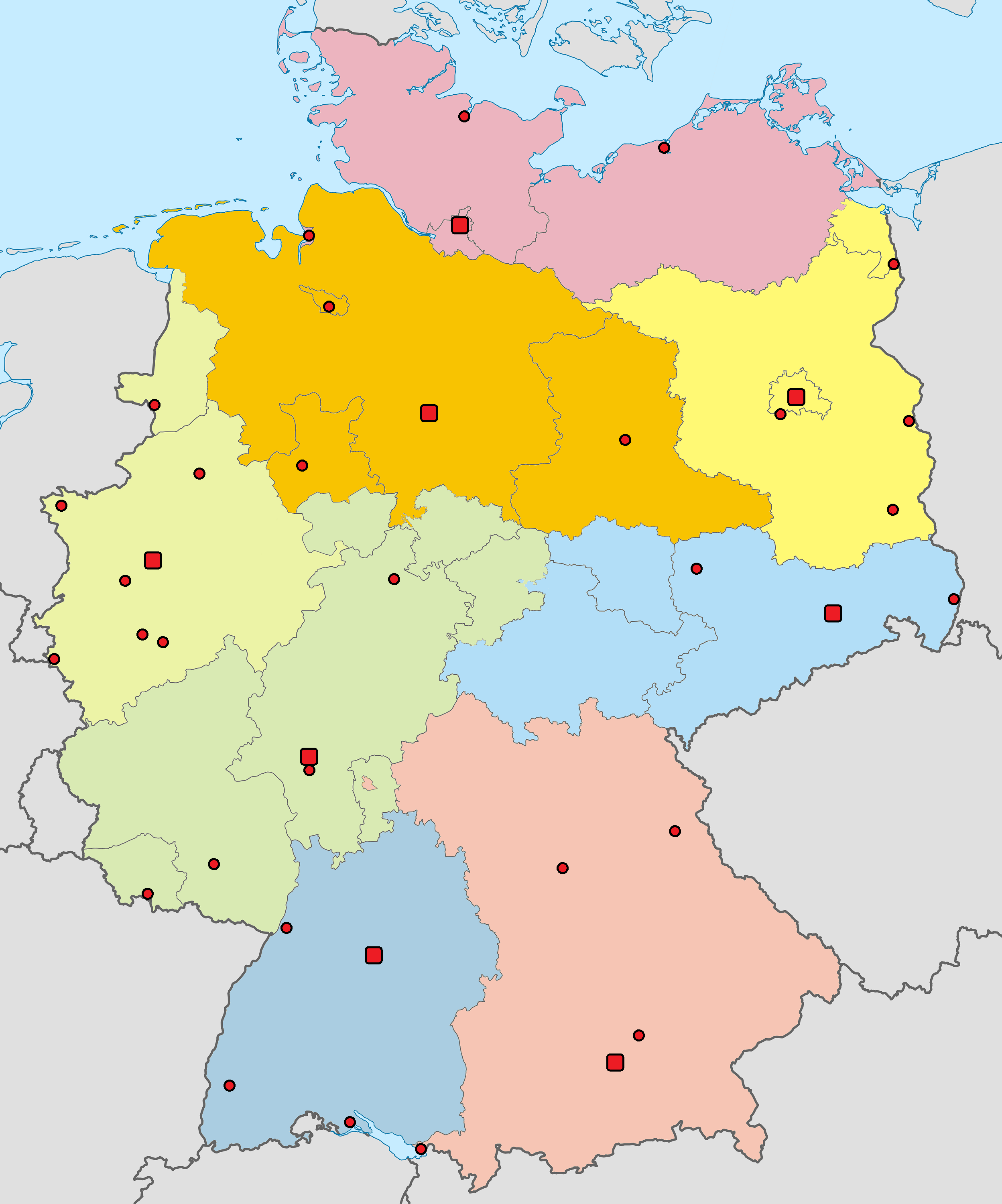
Map of the Customs Investigation Offices with districts and field offices

The Zollfahndungsamt (ZFA) is a German Customs Investigation Office. All ZFAs are directly subordinate to the central Zollkriminalamt (Customs Investigation Bureau) which has its headquarters in Cologne. Together they form the Zollfahndungsdienst (Customs Investigation Service).

There are currently eight ZFAs (in Berlin, Dresden, Essen, Frankfurt am Main, Hamburg, Hanover, Munich and Stuttgart) with 30 branch offices. They are subdivided into functional areas and investigate embargo contraventions, violations of market regulations, tax evasion and trademark violations. In addition, they have formed many joint task forces with the police to combat drug trafficking and international money laundering.

== See also ==
- Direction Nationale du Renseignement et des Enquêtes Douanières
