= German Parliament Police =

Federal police force for the German parliament

German Parliament Police Polizei beim Deutschen Bundestag
- Common name: Parlamentspolizei, Bundestagspolizei
- Abbreviation: Polizei DBT

Agency overview
- Formed: April 1950
- Preceding agency: Hausinspektion der Verwaltung des Deutschen Bundestags (1994)

Jurisdictional structure
- Operations jurisdiction: Germany
- Legal jurisdiction: Bundestag
- Governing body: President of the Bundestag
- Constituting instrument: Article 40, 2 Grundgesetz

Operational structure
- Headquarters: Berlin

Website
- bundestag.de (German)

The German Parliament Police (German: Polizei beim Deutschen Bundestag, lit. 'Police at the German Bundestag'), also known as Parlamentspolizei or Bundestagspolizei, is a separate security police force for the premises of the Bundestag in Berlin. The police force acts on behalf of the President of the Bundestag in their capacity as a law enforcement power for these premises.

== History ==
In April 1950 the House Inspectorate of the Administration of the German Parliament (German: Hausinspektion der Verwaltung des Deutschen Bundestags) was established to ensure the rule of law on the premises of the Bundestag in Bonn. Ranks differed considerably from that of other German police forces of the time. In 1994 it was renamed to its current name and ranks became similar to other police forces.

== Legal basis ==
According to Article 40, 2 of the German constitution only the President of the Bundestag may exercise police powers within the Bundestag's premises. Therefore a special police service independent from the executive power was necessary. The Bundespolizeibeamtengesetz (lit. 'Federal Police Officer Act') is applicable for all law enforcement officers of the Parliament Police.

== Duties ==
The police officers are partially recruited from state or federal police agencies. Due to a recruitment crisis across all German police forces, the force started to train their own candidates in 2013. This training is provided in collaboration with the German Federal Police. The role of German Parliament Police officers includes the vetting of visitors to the Bundestag, and removal of intruders.

Since 2018 they wear a uniform, which is similar to the one worn by the German Federal Police, but with their own patch, showing the eagle of the Bundestag and "Polizei" written above it.

Unlike any other police officers, officers of the Parliament Police are not empowered to assist Public Prosecutors in investigating crimes; they require explicit permission of the President of the Bundestag for such a role.

== See also ==
- Security police
