= Legal aid in Germany =

Legal aid in Germany is "embedded in the court system and is seen as a part of this". Germany was the first country to provide free legal aid representation for the poor in 1877, and represents the archetype of the so-called judicare system.

== Legal aid in civil and other non-criminal cases ==
Legal aid can be provided in civil (which includes family law), administrative, labour, social welfare and even constitutional disputes before courts if a party is not in a position to pay court and counsel fees. Legal aid is provided by exemption from court costs and payment of counsel fees from the state budget upon decision by the court. The amount provided in legal aid cases paid to the lawyer is regulated in a statutory fee schedule, but considerably lower than counsel could normally claim according to the regular fee table from a client who is not entitled to legal aid. The German Code of Civil Procedure provided a subsection entitled "the right of the poor" (in German: Armenrecht), which in 1980 was comprehensibly reformed and renamed "legal aid" (in German: Prozesskostenhilfe).

The granting of legal aid by the court requires that the applicant proves that (a) the claimant is economically not able to bear the costs of the procedures, (b) the lawsuit has a reasonable prospects of success, and (c) the cause of action is not frivolous. The application for legal aid is typically lodged together with the draft of the complaint with the bench of the competent court. This has the advantage that the legal aid applicant is provisionally relieved of the payment of the court costs while the bench not only reviews the applicant's economic status but also determines the merits of the case, i.e., as to whether the lawsuit appears to have reasonable prospect of success, based merely on the facts and arguments as presented in the draft complaint. Thus, a summary review of the cause of action is carried out by the court. Only if all conditions are met and legal aid thus granted will the court communicate the complaint to the other party and the judicial dispute thereby commences with the costs borne by the court. However, the litigant seeking legal aid can also lodge effectively the complaint together with auxiliary legal aid request but without making the pendency of the case dependent on the court granting legal aid; or the litigant requests legal aid support at a later stage but before completion of the case procedures. In the latter scenarios, if legal aid is rejected by the court the litigant, who sought legal aid, will bear the counsel and court fees if the lawsuit is unsuccessful (or will bear the costs partially if the suit is partially successful). Defence cases are treated equivalently.

The German judicare system leads to the review of legal aid cases on indigence and their merits first by the lawyers in private practice, then the courts, while averting dependence on external legal aid institutions removed from the judicial process. Another element of strength lies in the system's low cost. Altogether smaller amounts of state budgets are provided for legal aid per capita compared with other European countries. To secure receiving their fees through legal aid, lawyers' drafted briefs must have arguable merit thereby ensuring the high quality of representation of indigents. The substandard performance of lawyers is therefore not an option. The German model is also considered to put the indigent litigant on genuine equality with a wealthy litigant. The indigent has the same right to choose a lawyer as a more affluent person. The lawyer representing the indigent is naturally motivated to win the case, since as a victorious party the lawyer is entitled to recover the full lawyer's fees, i.e., not just the reduced legal aid fees, from the party that loses the case. The loser-pays-all system constitutes an incentive for lawyers to represent indigent clients.

== Legal aid in criminal procedures ==
In criminal procedures, the court assigns an accused with a defence counsel in so-called "necessary defence" cases if the accused has not already retained a lawyer. In practice, however, the court usually appoints the lawyer which the accused had already chosen for mandatory representation. Necessary defence means that the accused is charged with a felony that is punishable by a minimum sentence of one year's imprisonment, is tried before a higher court, already is detained on remand or otherwise not considered able to defend himself or herself. The entitlement of an accused to have counsel assigned in cases of mandatory legal representation is irrespective of indigence. The court-assigned defence lawyer is entitled to claim fees from the state budget. Like in civil proceedings, however, the legal aid fees are lower than fees the lawyer could otherwise claim from the client. Every lawyer can be appointed by the court as a public defender scheme does not exist in Germany. If the accused loses the case, i.e., is convicted, the court imposes the court fees and the costs of defence on the defendant. After conviction, the court-appointed lawyer can choose whether to execute a claim against the convicted client or the treasury. Normally, if the client is indigent, the lawyer will seek payment from the solvent debtor, the state. If a case does not require "necessary defence", an accused, who cannot pay a lawyer, is not entitled to be provided with counsel paid by the state but must defend himself or herself.
