= Customs Investigation Bureau (Germany) =

German Finance Ministry agency

Coordinates: 50°58′34″N 7°03′47″E

German Customs Investigation Bureau Zollkriminalamt
- Abbreviation: ZKA

Agency overview
- Formed: 1992
- Preceding agency: Zollkriminalinstitut

Jurisdictional structure
- Federal agency: Germany
- Operations jurisdiction: Germany
- Constituting instrument: Zollfahndungsdienstgesetz (ZFdG)
- General nature: Federal law enforcement
- Specialist jurisdiction: Customs, excise, gambling

Operational structure
- Headquarters: Cologne, Germany
- Elected officer responsible: Christian Lindner, Federal Minister of Finance
- Parent agency: Federal Ministry of Finance (Germany)
- Units: Zollfahndungsamt (ZFA); Zentrale Unterstützungsgruppe Zoll (ZUZ)

Website
- www.zoll.de

The German Customs Investigation Bureau in Cologne (German: Zollkriminalamt, ZKA) and its investigation offices are federal agencies that fall under the German Finance Ministry. The ZKA coordinates customs investigations nationwide in particular monitoring foreign trade, uncovering violations of EU market regulations, illegal technology exports, subsidy fraud in the agricultural sector, drug trafficking and money laundering.

In reaction to increasing violence, its Zentrale Unterstützungsgruppe Zoll (ZUZ) was formed in 1997 as the customs police tactical unit for use when regular officers would be in too much danger.

The Customs Investigation Offices (Zollfahndungsamt, ZFA) are directly integrated into the ZKA. There are currently eight ZFAs (in Berlin, Dresden, Essen, Frankfurt am Main, Hamburg, Hanover, Munich and Stuttgart) with 24 branches. They are subdivided into functional areas and investigate embargo contraventions, violations of market regulations, tax evasion and trademark violations. In addition, they have formed many joint task forces with the German Federal Police and State police forces to combat drug smuggling and international money laundering.
