= North Rhine-Westphalia Police =

German state police force

North Rhine-Westphalia Police Polizei Nordrhein-Westfalen
- Logo

Agency overview
- Employees: 50,000
- Annual budget: €3.401 billion (2019)

Jurisdictional structure
- Area: 34,110.26 km²
- Population: 17,912,134 (2017)
- General nature: Local civilian police

Operational structure
- Overseen by: State Interior Ministry
- Headquarters: Düsseldorf

Website
- Official website

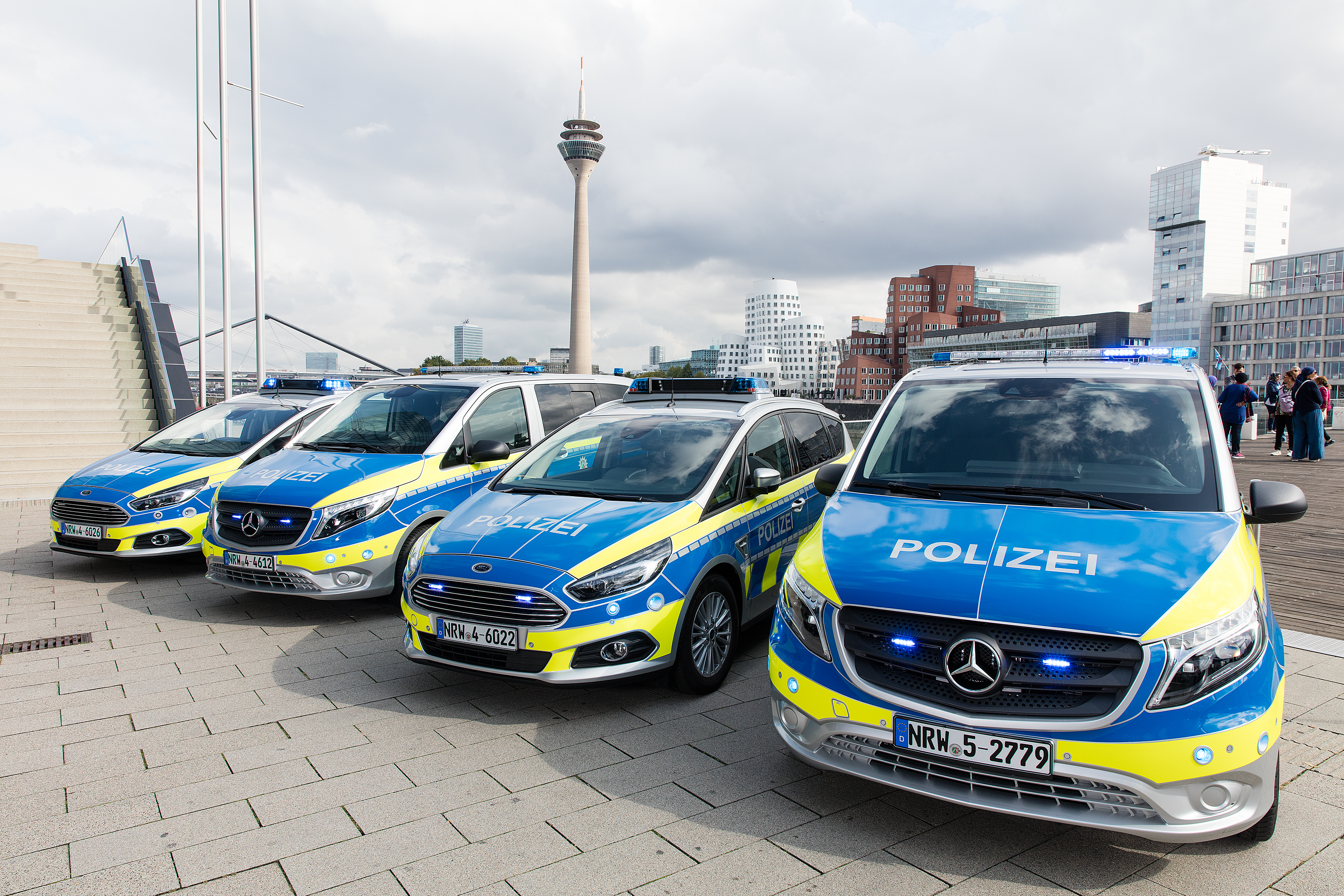
New North Rhine-Westphalia Police vehicles - Mercedes Vito and Ford S-Max

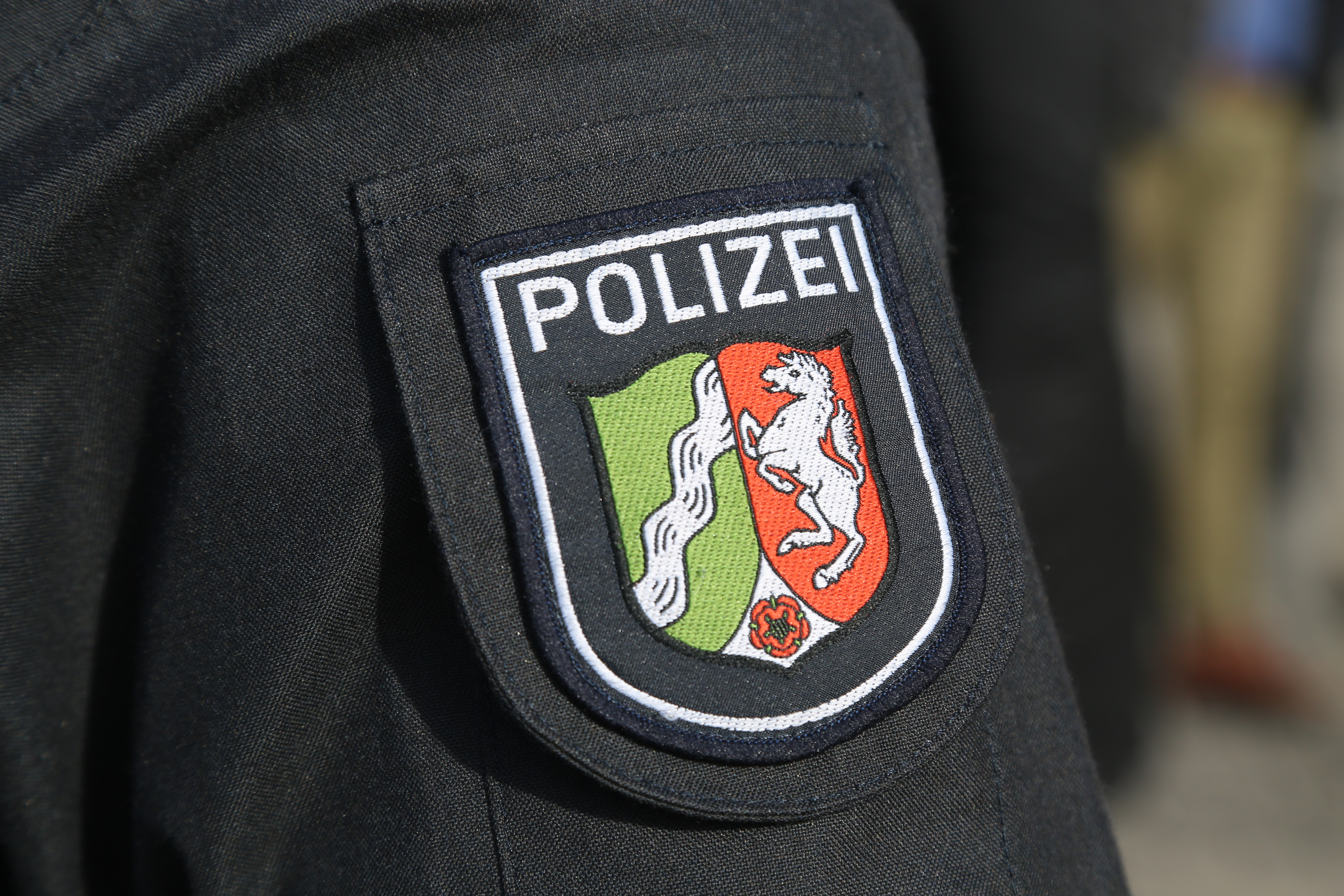
North Rhine-Westphalia Police patch

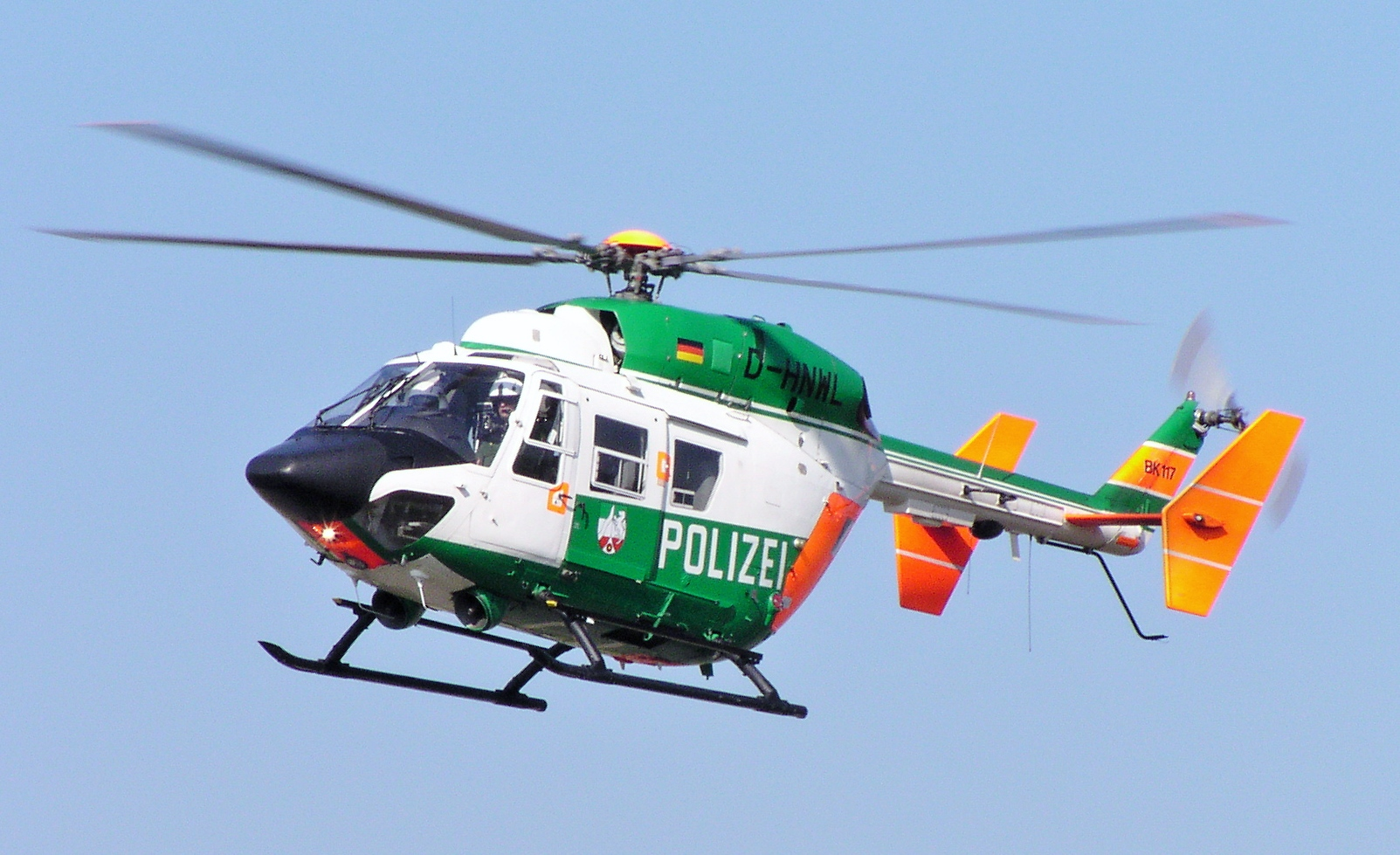
BK 117 B2 Police helicopter of the North Rhine-Westphalia State Police

The North Rhine-Westphalia (NRW) State Police Force (German: Polizei Nordrhein-Westfalen) is the largest of the 16 German state police forces with around 50,000 personnel.

== Detachments ==
NRW has 47 police detachments. The 18 urban detachments are headed by a President of Police appointed by the NRW state government and the 29 rural detachments are headed by the county chief administration officer elected for five years by municipal elections. So the chief of police is always a civilian assisted by a senior police officer responsible for law enforcement operations. These authorities are supervised by the State Agency for Central Police Services (LZPD) in Duisburg.

== State investigation bureau ==
The NRW Landeskriminalamt in Düsseldorf (LKA NRW) is NRW's state investigation bureau. Although investigations are principally the responsibility of each regional police force, NRW's LKA investigates and prosecutes crimes if the Police Organisation Act requires it or if the Interior Ministry, Ministry of Justice, a court of justice or a public prosecutor's office requests its involvement.

Its director is the only police officer leading an operational police authority in NRW and reports directly to the NRW Interior Ministry. Its six operational departments are the state's central authorities for dealing with serious crime.

- Department 1 conducts investigations and analysis of organised crime.
- Department 2 is responsible for state security and investigations of political extremism.
- Department 3 deals with the analysis and evaluation of crime and works on crime prevention and crime control projects.
- Department 4 provides operational support. It coordinates the missions, training and equipment for highly specialised operational units, it gives advice to the police commanders at major incidents and provides support to international law enforcement agencies. The department hosts the Central Information Service for Sport Events and the NRW Police Aviation Group.
- Department 5 is the NRW Forensic Institute. It performs all forensic tests needed for prosecution. About 200 scientists and experts perform roughly 25,000 tests per year.
- Department 6 has special technical support units that assist other law enforcement agencies with technical or special know-how. This may occur if investigations become difficult e.g. scenes of fire, accidents (explosives, explosive devices) or computer crimes. The department also has a surveillance team and a target search unit.

== Water police ==
The state's water police (Wasserschutzpolizei) is centrally organized and patrols over 900 km of waterways. Its headquarters is in Duisburg as part of Duisburg Constabulary and it has stations (Wasserschutzpolizeiwache) in Bonn, Cologne, Düsseldorf, Wesel, Emmerich, Münster, Minden, Bergeshövede, Datteln and Essen. The force has 24 boats and patrols the Rhine, Weser, Ems and Ruhr (as far as Essen) rivers and the North German canals.

== Highway patrol ==
Highway patrol (Autobahnpolizei) duties are conducted from bases in the five biggest local police districts - Cologne, Düsseldorf, Münster, Dortmund, and Bielefeld.

== Support institutions ==
Three police institutions support operations and provide training and development:

- The NRW State Bureau for Training, Professional Development and Personnel (Landesamt für Ausbildung, Fortbildung und Personalangelegenheiten or LAFP) provides all basic operational training for police candidates and offers a wide range of vocational training and professional development for all officers. The LAFP's headquarters is in Selm-Bork and has facilities in Brühl, Linnich, Neuss, Münster and Schloss Holte-Stukenbrock.
- The State Agency for Central Police Services (Landesamt für Zentrale Polizeiliche Dienste or LZPD) offers technical support, testing and research. It is responsible for vehicle and equipment acquisition and provides IT and communications support and supervising the 47 detachments.
- The City of Münster in NRW hosts the national German Police University (DHPol) which is a jointly administered institution for all the state and federal forces.

== See also ==
- Landespolizei
