= Zentrale Unterstützungsgruppe Zoll =

Tactical unit of the German Customs Service

Central Customs Support Group
- Zentrale Unterstützungsgruppe Zoll
- Active: 1997 – present
- Country: Germany
- Agency: Bundeszollverwaltung
- Type: Police tactical unit
- Headquarters: Cologne; 50°58′37″N 7°03′53″E
- Abbreviation: ZUZ

Structure
- Officers: 47

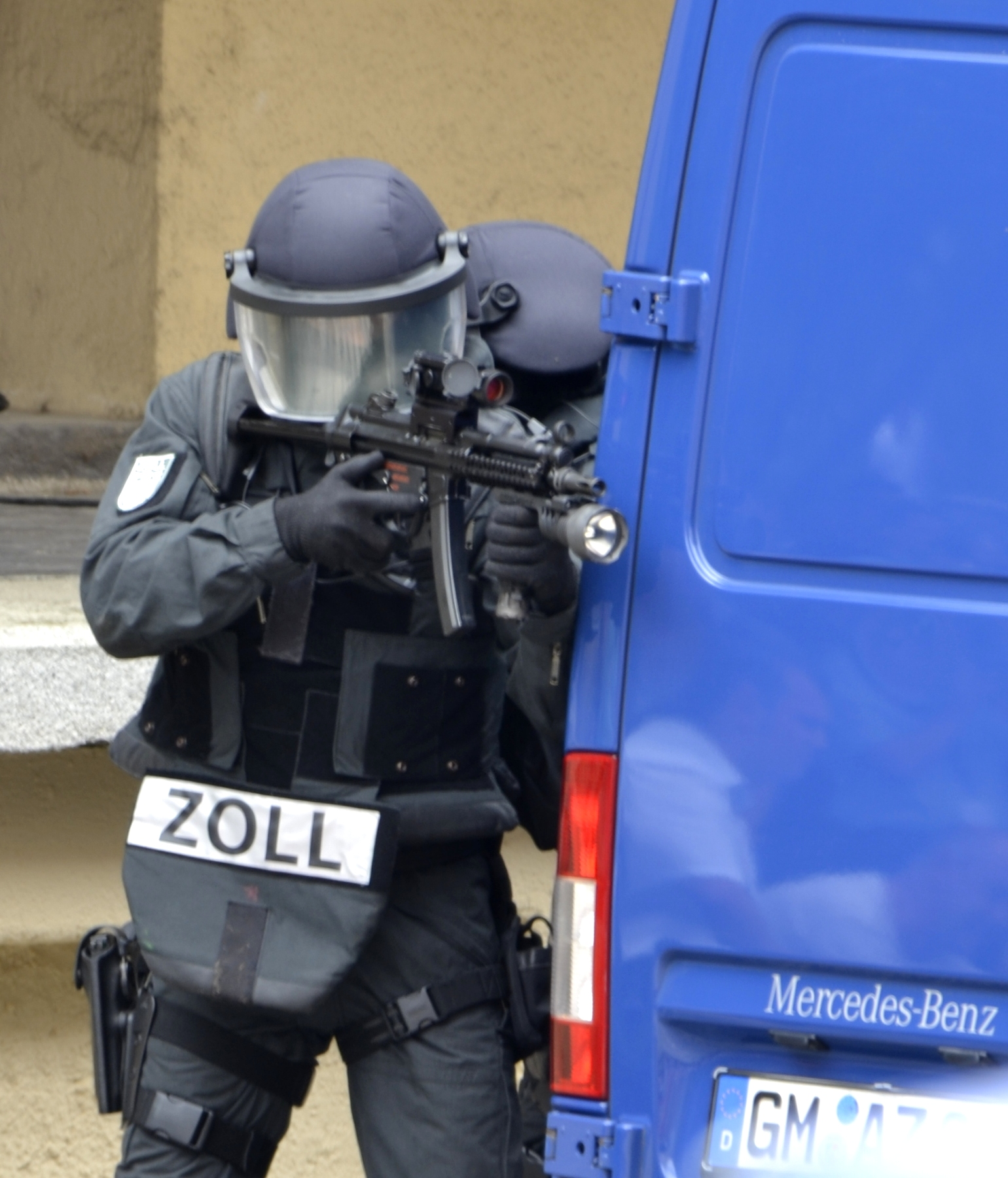
A member of the ZUZ

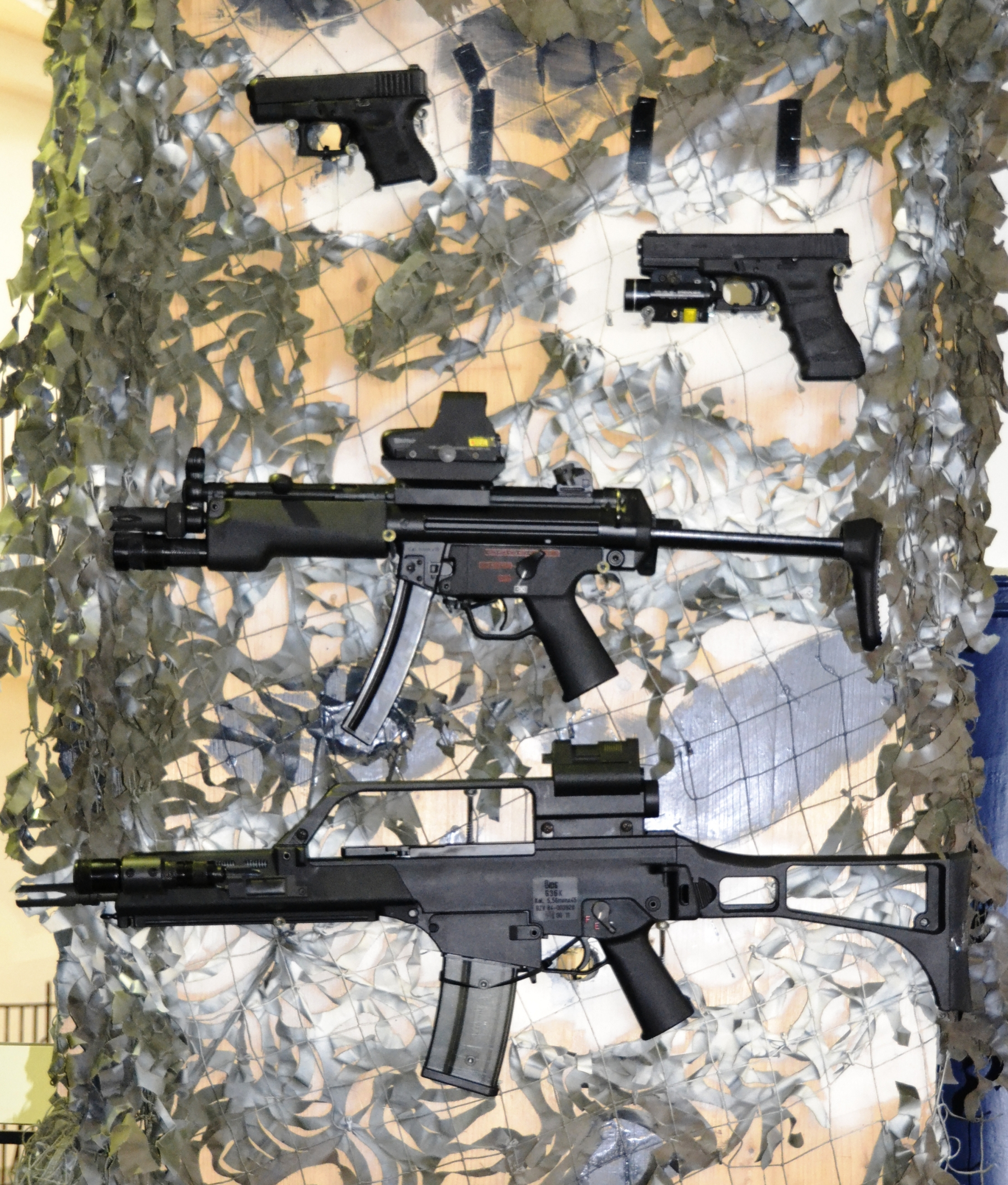
Weapons used by the ZUZ

The Zentrale Unterstützungsgruppe Zoll (ZUZ) (Central Customs Support Group) is the police tactical unit of the German Customs Service (Bundeszollverwaltung) and subordinate to the German Customs Investigation Bureau (Zollkriminalamt, ZKA).

== History ==
In response to the increasing violence against law enforcement officers, the ZUZ was formed in 1997 as the customs tactical unit for use when regular officers would be in too much danger. Until that point, the German Customs services requested the service of the SEK units or the GSG 9 for high-risk missions. However, due to the workload of these units, the German Customs Service decided to establish their own special unit for these types of missions.

== Recruitment and training ==
Any member of the German Customs Service can apply for the selection process of the ZUZ. Requirements are:

- Not older than 35 years
- Physical and mental fitness

The selection process lasts 14 days and includes physical tests, medical examinations, interviews and aptitude tests.

Upon completion of the selection process, new ZUZ members have to attend a 10-week basic training which is followed by a 48-week advanced training.

Preservation of the various basic skills (i.e., shooting, sport and self-defence) is a top priority on the ZUZ training plan as well as driving and safety training and courses on new technical devices.

== Equipment ==
In addition to an extensive fleet, ZUZ members are armed with the following weapons:

Name	Country of origin	Type
Glock 17	Austria	Semi-automatic pistol
Glock 26	Austria	Semi-automatic pistol
Heckler & Koch MP5	Germany	Submachine gun
Heckler & Koch G36	Germany	Assault rifle
Heckler & Koch HK416	Germany	Assault rifle
