= Schleswig-Holstein Police =

State police of the German state Schleswig-Holstein

Schleswig-Holstein State Police Landespolizei Schleswig-Holstein

Agency overview
- Formed: January 1, 1947
- Employees: 8,736

Jurisdictional structure
- Operations jurisdiction: Schleswig-Holstein, Germany
- Location of Schleswig-Holstein shown in Germany
- Area: 15.799,65 km²
- Population: 2,881,926
- General nature: Civilian police

Operational structure
- Overseen by: Schleswig-Holstein Ministry of the Interior, Municipal Affairs, Housing and Sports (Ministerium für Inneres, Kommunales, Wohnen und Sport)
- Headquarters: Kiel
- Agency executive: Dr. Maren Freyher, Landespolizeidirektorin (Director of State Police)

Website
- Polizei Schleswig-Holstein

Schleswig-Holstein Police (German: Landespolizei Schleswig-Holstein) is a state law-enforcement agency in Schleswig-Holstein, Germany. It is subordinated to the Schleswig-Holstein Ministry of the Interior, Municipal Affairs, Housing and Sports.

== Responsibilities ==
The Police in Schleswig-Holstein are responsible for averting dangers to public order and safety, and to aid and notify Authorities tasked with Public Safety if necessary, as well as to determine and investigate misdemeanors. Part of averting dangers to Public Safety is responding to Emergencies. Furthermore, the Police must investigate Crime according to § 163 StPO.

== Equipment ==
The Schleswig-Holstein Police is equipped with blue Uniforms, which is used in Hamburg, Bremen, Lower-Saxony, Thuringia and Mecklenburg-Vorpommern as well. Unlike the other States using the uniform, Schleswig-Holstein has opted to equip their Officers with white service caps. Officers are equipped with pepper spray, batons and Walter P99Q-Pistols. Patrol cars are also equipped with Heckler und Koch MP5 and SigSauer MCX. Both MP5 and MCX are to be replaced with the Heckler und Koch 437. Tasers are currently being field-tested by Officers in Neumünster and Ahrensburg.

== Organisation ==
As per the Polizeiorganisationsgesetz of 2004 (Police organisation law), the Schleswig-Holstein State Police was reorganised into the Landespolizeiamt (State Office of the Police) and the Landeskriminalamt (State Office of Criminal Investigation).

=== Landeskriminalamt ===
The Landeskriminalamt (commonly abbreviated as LKA) oversees operation of the Kriminalpolizei (Criminal Investigation Police) within Schleswig-Holstein and coordinates large-scale and high-profile criminal investigations. It is divided into five Departments which are tasked with administrative duties, Investigation and Analysis, State security, Forensics and tactical Units.

Each year, the Landeskriminalamt Schleswig-Holstein publishes crime statistics (Polizeiliche Kriminalstatistik) as well as a study on unreported criminal activity (Dunkelfeldstudie).

The LKA's current head of department is Thomas Bauchrowitz.

=== Landespolizeiamt ===
The Landespolizeiamt deals with matters of human resources, administration, budget and acquisition of material. It is divided into a staff position and four sections. They are Police Management, IT-Management, Human Resource Management and Waterways Police. The Landespolizeiamt is headed by the Landespolizeidirektorin Dr. Marhen Freyher.

=== Polizeidirektionen ===
The Landespolizeiamt supervises the eight Police Directorates (Polizeidirektionen) of Schleswig-Holstein.

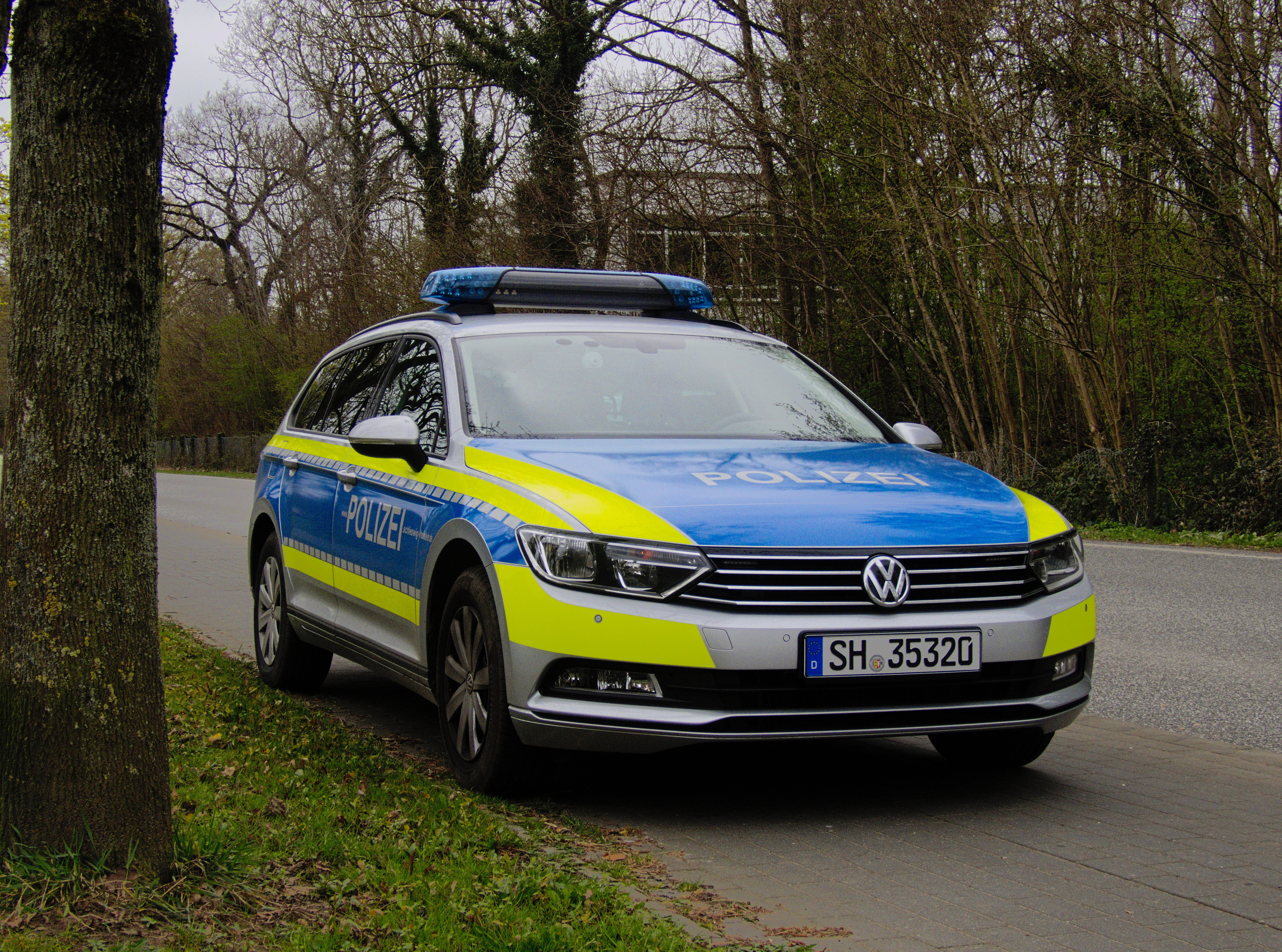
A Patrol car used by the Schleswig-Holstein Police

==== Polizeidirektion Kiel ====
The Police Directorate Kiel is responsible for Kiel and the district of Plön.

Within the city of Kiel it is divided into four precincts, with additional Police stations subordinated to the 1st precinct in Kiel-Friederichsort, Kiel-Suchsdorf and Kiel-Wik, to the 3rd precinct in Kiel-Hassee and in Kiel-Mettenhof, as well as to the 4th precinct in Kiel-Dietrichsdorf and Kiel-Wellsee. The Polizeibezirksrevier (Police district precinct) and Criminal Investigation Police precinct (Bezirkskriminalinspektion) serves the Kiel area as well.

The district of Plön has one precinct, which is divided into the precinct itself and seven stations in Preetz, Wankendorf, Schwentinental, Schönkirchen, Heikendorf, Schönberg and Lütjenburg.

==== Polizeidirektion Lübeck ====
The Police Directorate Lübeck is responsible for the City of Lübeck and the district of Ostholstein.

Within the City of Lübeck, the Directorate is divided into four precincts, with additional Police stations subordinated to the 2nd precinct in Lübeck-Buntekuh, to the 3rd precinct in Lübeck-Kücknitz, Lübeck-Travemünde, Lübeck-Schlutup and Lübeck-Eichholz, and to the 4th precinct in Lübeck-Moisling, Lübeck-Blankensee, Lübeck-St. Jürgen and Lübeck-Hüxtertor.

The district of Ostholstein is served by the Eutin precinct, with Police stations in Malente, Süsel and Hutzfeld, the Bad Schwartau precinct with police stations in Stockelsdorf, Ahrensbök, Timmendorfer Strand, Scharbeutz and Ratekau, the Heiligenhafen precinct with Police stations in Oldenburg, Fehmarn, Lensahn and Großenbrode, as well as the Neustadt precinct with Police stations in Grube, Schönwalde and Grömitz.

The Police Directorate also contains a Autobahnpolizei (Autobahn-Police precinct).

The Criminal Investigation Police (Kriminalpolizei) is based in Lübeck with a Criminal Investigation Police precinct, onto which Departments of the Criminal Investigation Police (Kriminalinspektionen) in Bad Schwartau, Oldenburg, Neustadt and Eutin are subordinated.

==== Polizeidirektion Flensburg ====
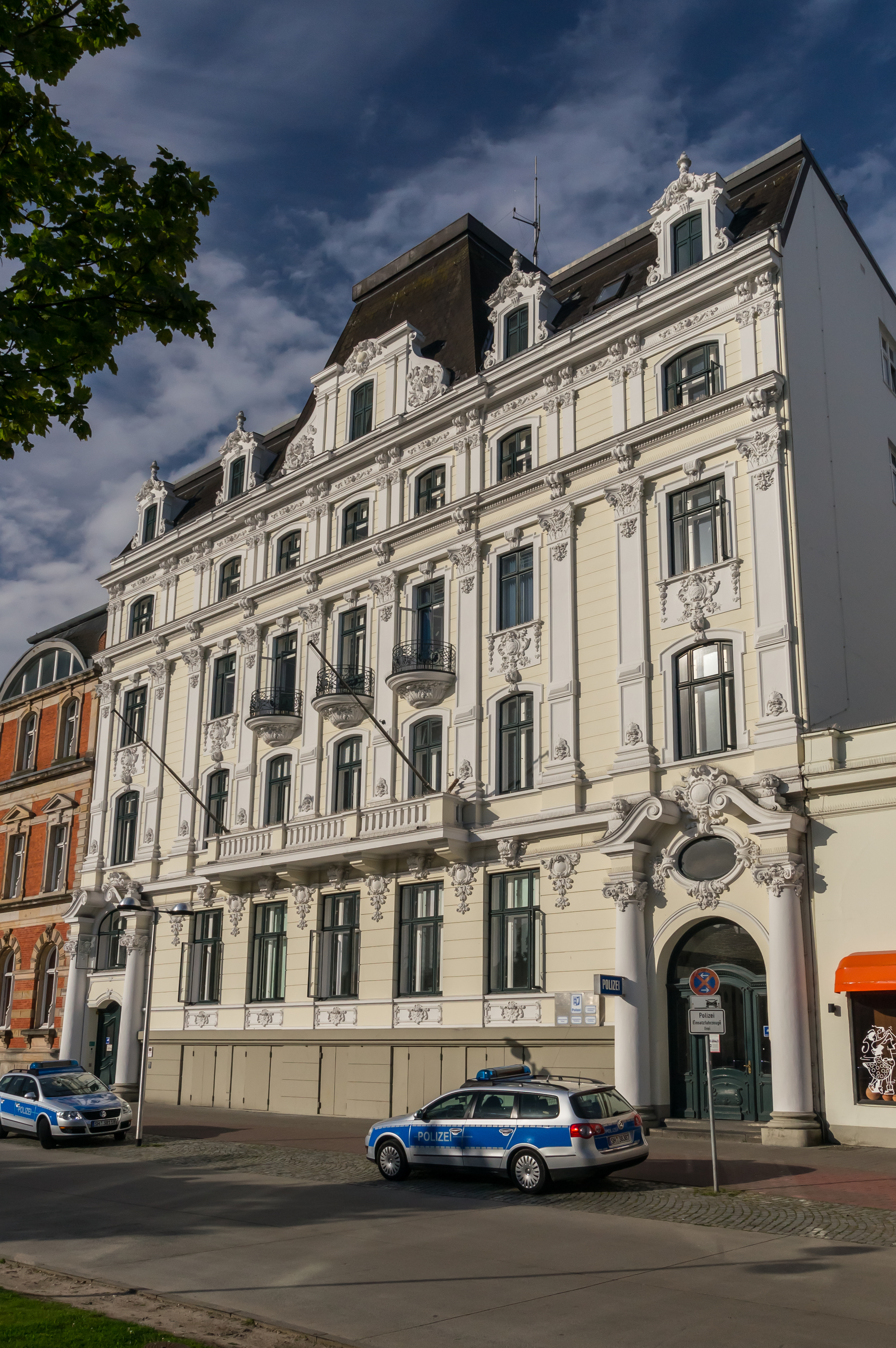
Police Directorate Flensburg

The Police Directorate Flensburg is the northernmost Police Directorate within Schleswig-Holstein and responsible for the City of Flensburg and the districts of Schleswig-Flensburg and Northern Frisia.

The City of Flensburg is divided into two precincts, with additional Police stations subordinated to the 2nd precinct in Flensburg-Mitte, Flensburg-Mürwik, Flensburg-Engelsby, Flensburg-Nord, Flensburg-Friesischer Berg, Flensburg-Weiche, Harrislee, Handewitt, Glücksburg, Schafflund and Husby.

The district of Schleswig-Flensburg is split between a precinct in Schleswig and Kappeln. The precinct in Schleswig is subdivided into Police stations in Kropp, Silberstedt, Erfde, Busdorf and Böklund, while the precinct in Kappeln is subdivided into Police stations in Süderbarup, Steinbergkirche, Mittelangeln and Tarp.

The district of Northern Frisia is served by the Sylt precinct, the Niebüll precinct along with Police stations in Leck, Bredstedt, Wyk auf Föhr and Nebel, as well as the Husum precinct along with Police stations in Friederichsstadt, Viöl, Hattsdtedt, Pellworm, Tönning, Garding, St.-Peter Ording and Seeth.

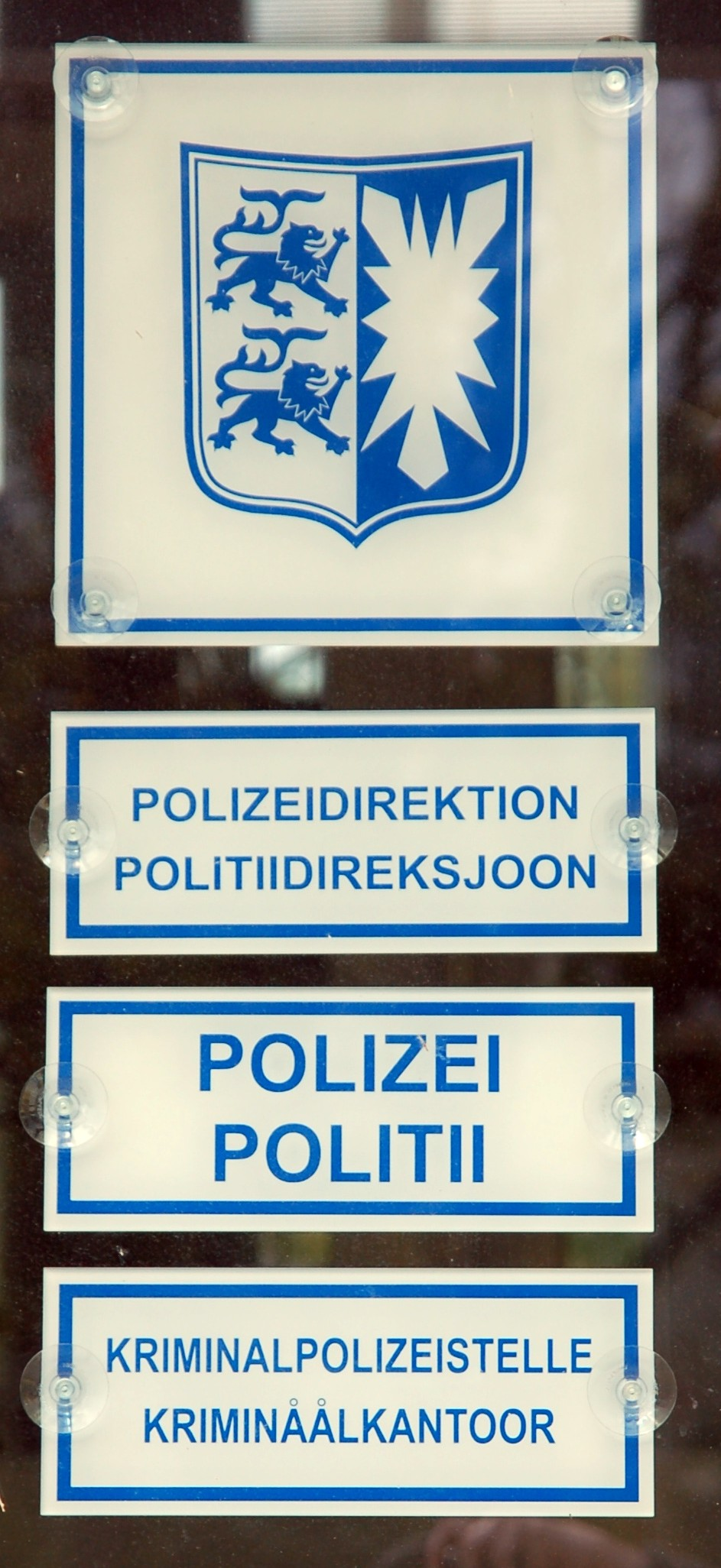
Bilingual Signage at the Husum Police Precinct

The criminal Investigation Police are based out of Flensburg with a Precinct. There are additional Criminal Investigation Police Stations in Husum, Schleswig, Sylt and Niebüll.

The Police Directorate also contains a Autobahnpolizei (Autobahn-Police precinct) in Schuby and Schleswig.

==== Polizeidirektion Neumünster ====
The Police Directorate Neumünster is responsible for the City of Neumünster and the district of Rendsurg-Eckernförde.

Within the city of Neumünster it is divided into two precincts, with additional Police stations subordinated to the 2nd precinct in Neumünster-Faldera, Neumünster-Einfeld, Neumünster-Tungendorf, Neumünster-Mitte, Neumünster-Wittdorf, Neumünster-Gadeland and Neumünster-West. Furthermore, there is a station at the Neumünster refugee accommodation (Landesunterkunft Neumünster) and a specialized traffic collision unit. Additionally, based in Neumünster is a Autobahnpolizei (Autobahn-Police) and the Verkehrsüberwachungsdienst (Traffic surveillance unit), specialized on the repression and prevention of road rage.

The district of Rendsburg-Eckernförde is covered by several precincts with subordinated stations. The Rendsurg precinct with stations in Österrönfeld, Fockbek and Owschlag, the Hohenwestedt precinct with stations in Handerau-Hademarschen and Jevestedt, the Nortorf precinct with a station in Aukrug, as well as the Bordesholm precinct with stations in Molfsee and Flintbek. Furthermore, a Kronshagen precinct with a station in Achterwehr, and a Eckernförde precinct with stations in Gettorf, Ascheffel, Damp, Altenholz, Rieseby and Schwedeneck. Rendburg-Eckernförde is also served by a Polizeibezirksrevier (Police district precinct).

The Police Directorate also contains a Autobahnpolizei (Autobahn-Police precinct) and a Department of the Criminal Investigation Police (Kriminalinspektion).

==== Polizeidirektion Itzehoe ====
The Police Directorate Itzehoe is responsible for the districts of Steinburg and Ditmarsh.

The Itzehoe precinct is responsible for the district of Steinburg, along with its Police stations in Kellinghusen, Hohenlockstedt, Schenefeld and Wellenkamp.

Responsibility for the Ditmarsh district rests with the Brunsbüttel precinct with its Police stations in Glückstadt, Marne, Wilster, Krempe, Burg and Horst, as well as the Heide precinct with Police stations in Meldorf, Büsum, Albersdorf, Lunden, Hennstedt, Tellingstedt and Wesselbüren. A Polizeibezirksrevier (Police district precinct) serves the area as well.

The Criminal Investigation Police (Kriminalpolizei) is based in Itzehoe with a Criminal Investigation Police precinct, onto which a Department of the Criminal Investigation Police (Kriminalinspektion) in Heide is subordinated.

==== Polizeidirektion Bad Segeberg ====
The Police Directorate Bad Segeberg is responsible for the districts of Segeberg and Pinneberg.

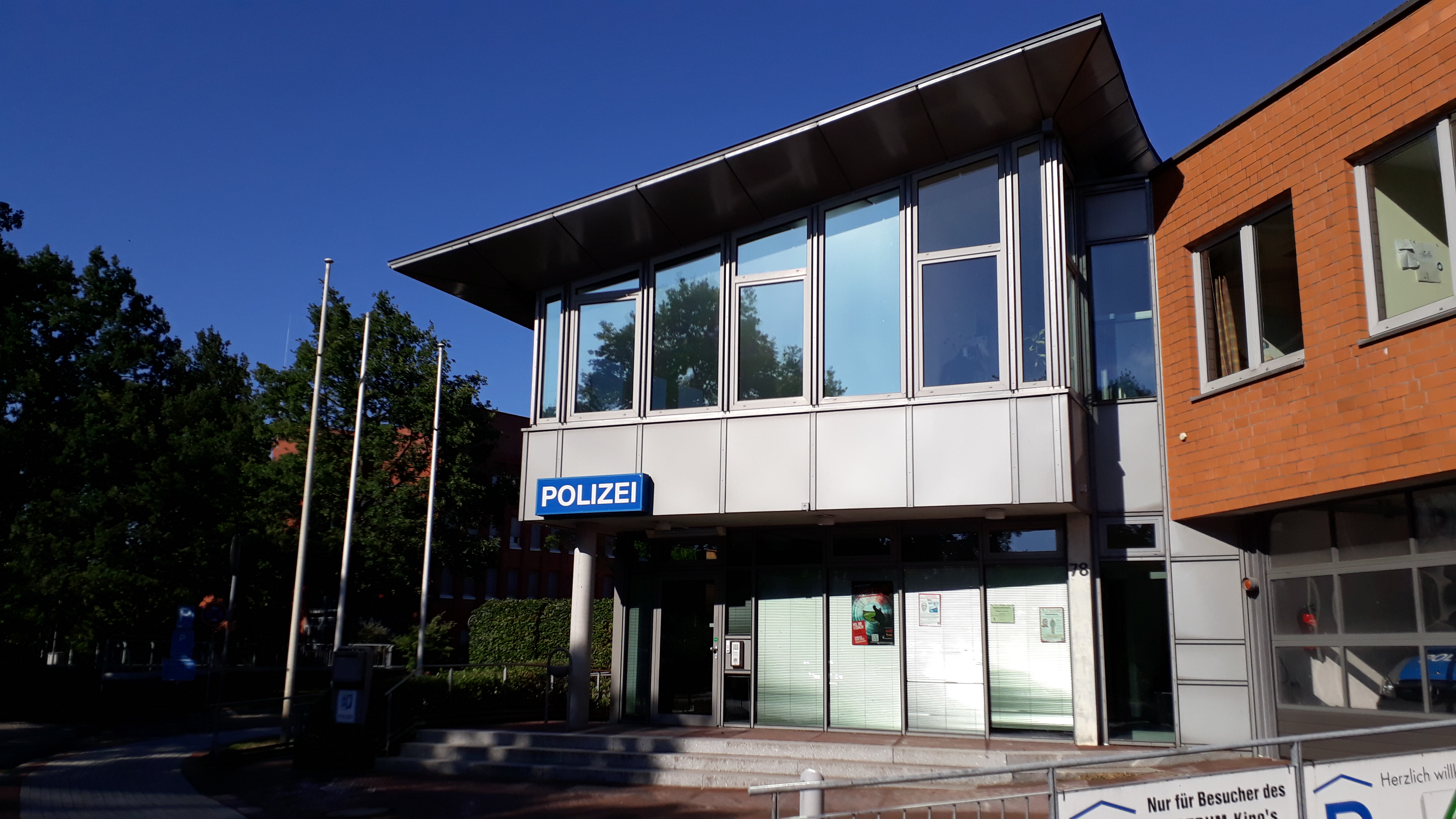
Norderstedt-Mitte Police Station

The district of Segeberg is covered by a precinct in Bad Segeberg with subordinated Police stations in Garbek, Wahlstedt, Leezen, Rickling and Trappenkamp, a precinct in Norderstedt along with stations in Norderstedt-Mitte and Norderstedt-Ost, as well as a precinct in Kaltenkirchen with Police stations in Bad Bramstedt, Boostedt, Henstedt-Ulzburg, Ellerau, Tangstedt and Itzstedt.

The district of Pinneberg is served by the Pinneberg precinct with a Police station in Kummerfeld, the Rellingen precinct along with Police stations in Schenefeld, Bönningstedt and Quickborn, the Elmshorn precinct with Police stations in Barmstedt and Brande-Hörnerkirchen, and the Wedel precinct with a Police station in Uetersen.

Within the Police Directorate, there are two Autobahnpolizei (Autobahn-Police precinct), one in Bad Segeberg, and one in Elmshorn.

The Criminal Investigation Police (Kriminalpolizei) are based in Bad Segeberg, Norderstedt, Pinneberg and Elmshorn with Criminal Investigation Police Departments.

==== Polizeidirektion Ratzeburg ====
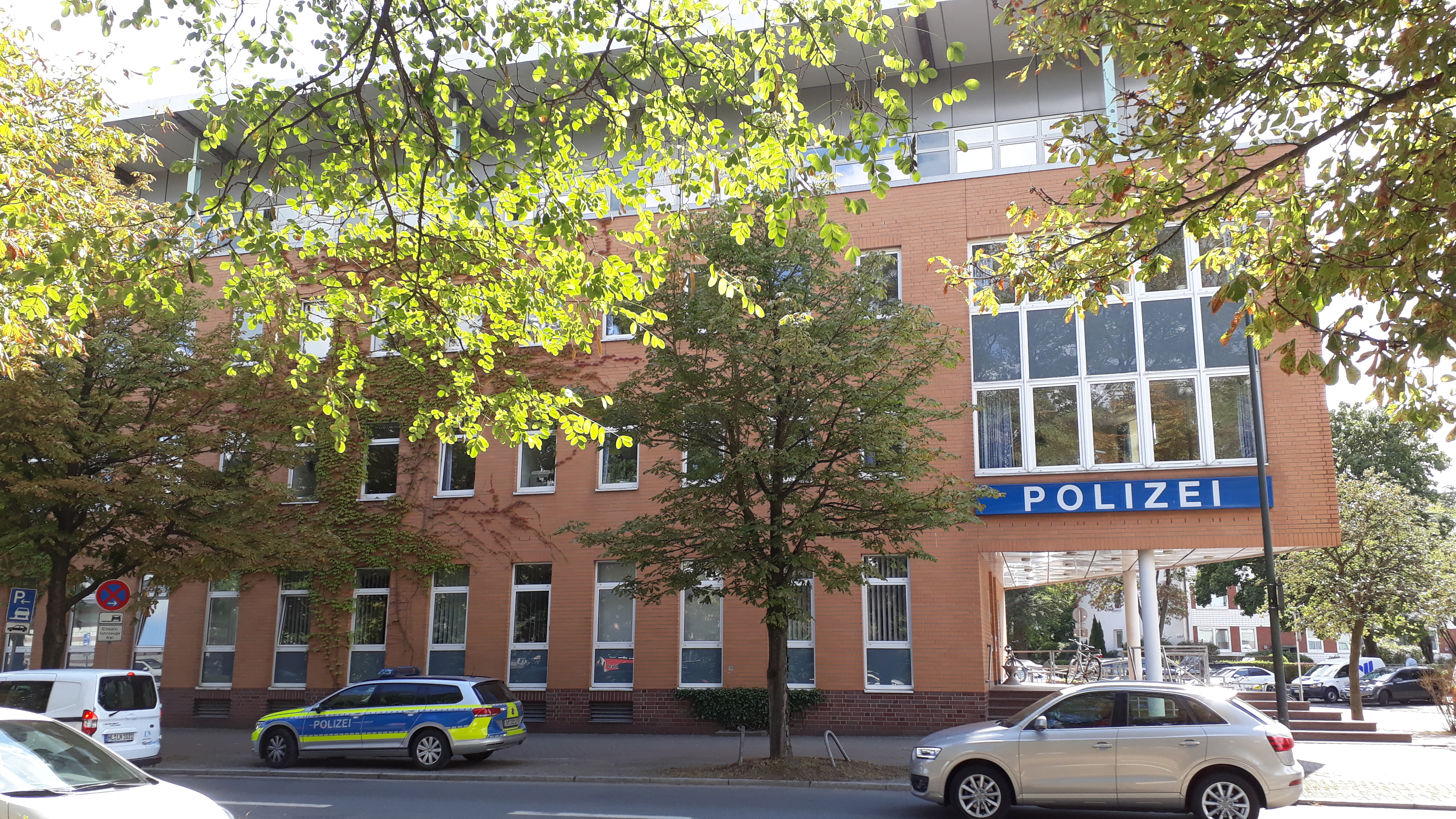
Ahrensburg Police Precinct

The Police Directorate Ratzeburg is responsible for the districts of Herzogtum Lauenburg and Stormarn.

Responsible for the district of Stormarn is the Bad Oldesloe precinct along with its Police station in Reinfeld, the Reinbek precinct with Police stations in Wentorf, Glinde, Barsbüttel and Aumühle.

The district of Herzogtum Lauenburg is served by the precinct in Ratzeburg, along with Police stations in Berkenthin, Sandesneben, Mölln and Nusse, by the Schwarzenbek precinct with its Police stations in Lauenburg and Büchen, as well as by a precinct in Ahrensburg with Police stations in Großhansdorf, Trittau, Bargteheide and Ammersbek.

The Criminal Investigation Police (Kriminalpolizei) is based in Bad Oldesloe with a Criminal Investigation Police precinct, onto which Departments of the Criminal Investigation Police (Kriminalinspektionen) in Ahrensburg, Reinbek, Ratzeburg and Geesthacht are subordinated.

==== Polizeidirektion für Aus- und Fortbildung und die Bereitschaftspolizei ====
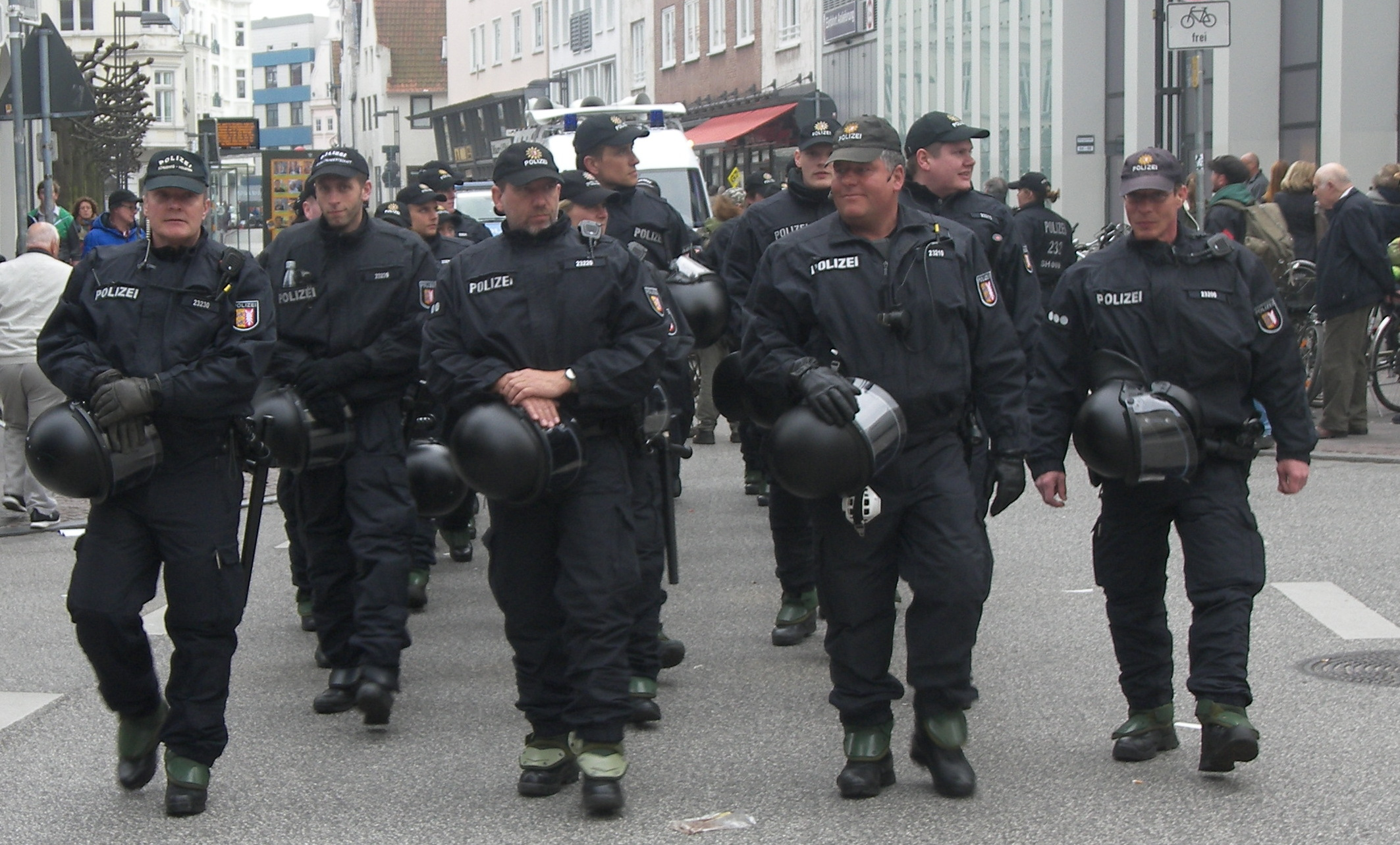
Schleswig-Holstein riot Police officers

The Polizeidrektion für Aus- und Fortbildung und die Bereitschaftspolizei is a Police Directorate based in Eutin. Its function within the Schleswig-Holstein State Police is to provide training to both aspiring and experienced Police officers. The Schleswig-Holstein riot Police (Bereitschaftspolizei) is also subordinated to the Directorate.

==== Wasserschutzpolizei ====
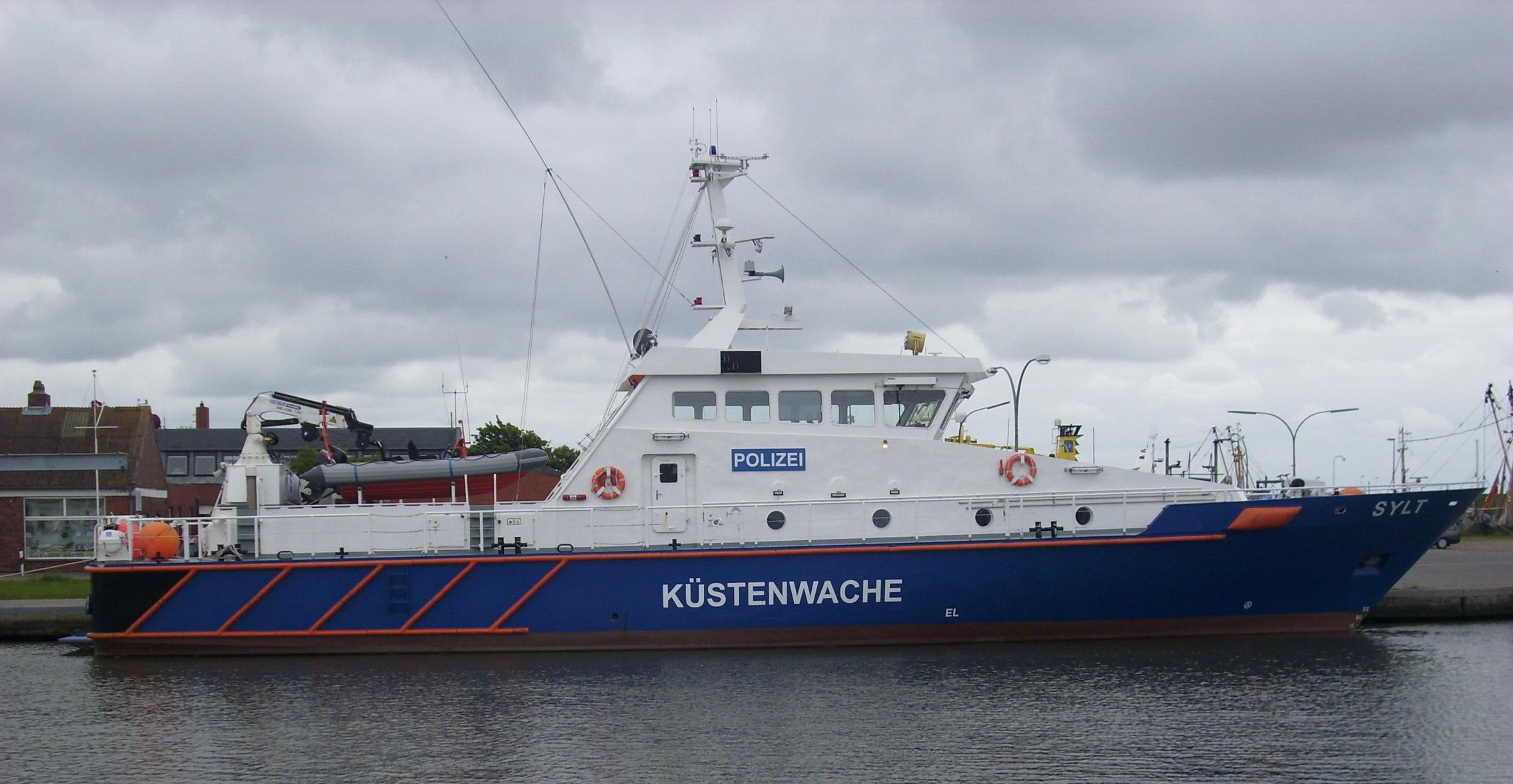
Patrolboat "Sylt"

The Maritime Police (Wasserschutzpolizei) is directly subordinated to the Landespolizeiamt and isn't part of a Police Directorate. Additionally to the German national waters on the Schleswig-Holstein coast, the Waterways Police also patrols the Kiel Canal.

Waterways Police Precincts are located in Kiel, Brunsbüttel and Lübeck, its subordinated stations in Flensburg, Kappeln, Husum, Heligoland and Fehmarn.

The Island of Heligoland is patrolled by the Waterways Police, as opposed to other German Islands.

== Ranks ==
The ranking-system of the Schleswig-Holstein State Police is divided into three levels: the junior level, Laufbahngruppe 1.2, formerly known as mittlerer Dienst, the senior level, Laufbahngruppe 2.1, formerly known as gehobener Dienst, and the command level, Laufbahngruppe 2.2, formerly known as höherer Dienst. Uniformed officers, such as those of the Schutzpolizei visibly wear their rank. Officers of the Criminal Investigation Police do not wear Uniforms, thus there are no Insignias designed for them. Within the ranking system, their titles differ from those of the Schutzpolizei, as the prefix Polizei- is changed to Kriminal-. For example: The equivalent to a Polizeioberkommissar would be a Kriminaloberkommissar.

Laufbahngruppe 1.2 (mittlerer Dienst)

Rank	Insignia
Polizeiobermeisteranwärter	Insignia of a Polizeiobermeisteranwärter
Polizeiobermeister	Insignia of a Polizeiobermeister
Polizeihauptmeister	
Polizeihauptmeister mit Zulage	Insignia of a Polizeihauptmeister mit Zulage

Laufbahngruppe 2.1 (gehobener Dienst)

Rank	Insignia
Polizeikommissaranwärter	Insignia of a Polizeikommissaranwärter
Polizeikommissar	Insignia of a Polizeikommissar
Polizeioberkommissar	Insignia of a Polizeioberkommissar
Polizeihauptkommissar	Insignias of a Polizehauptkommissar Insignias of a Polizehauptkommissar
Erster Polizeihauptkommissar	Insignias of a Erster Polizehauptkommissar

Laufbahngruppe 2.2 (höherer Dienst)

Rank	Insignia
Polizeirat	Insignias of a Polizeirat
Polizeioberrat	Insignias of a Polizeioberrat
Polizeidirektor	Insignias of a Polizeidirektor
Leitender Polizeidirektor	Insignias of a Leitender Polizeidirektor
Leitender Polizeidirektor (als Behördenleiter)	Insignias of a Leitender Polizeidirektor as Head of Department
Landespolizeidirektorin	Insignia of the Landespolizeidirektor

== Training ==
The Schleswig-Holstein State Police ranks are divided into three levels, into which applicants may enter after completing the rank-specific selection process: The Laufbahngruppe 1.2, formerly known as mittlerer Dienst, the lowest of the three rank-levels, and the Laufbahngruppe 2.1, formerly known as gehobener Dienst. Entering the Criminal Investigation Police-Branch is only possible for applicants of Laufbahngruppe 2.1 (gehobener Dienst).

Aspiring Police Officers of Laufbahngruppe 1.2 (mittlerer Dienst) bear the title of Polizeiobermeisteranwärter during one and a half year of training at the Polizeidirektion für Aus- und Fortbildung und die Bereitschaftspolizei and a year of training on the job at a Police precinct or station in Schleswig-Holstein. After said training, they are promoted to the rank of Polizeiobermeister.

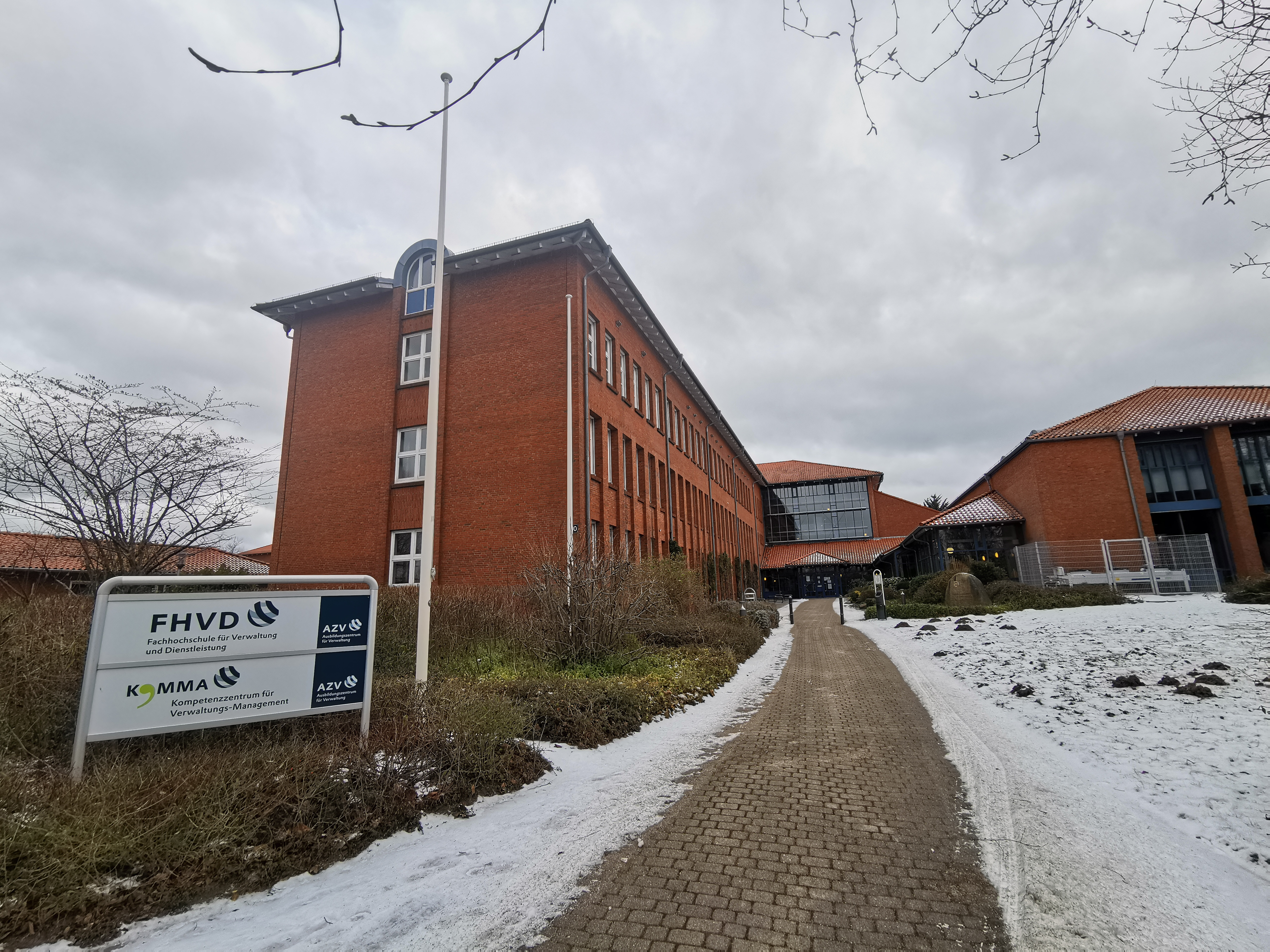
Fachhochschule für Verwaltung und Dienstleistung

Aspiring Police Officers of Laufbahngruppe 2.1 (gehobener Dienst) bear the title of Polizeikommissaranwärter, or Kriminalkommissaranwärter during half a year of training at the Polizeidirektion für Aus- und Fortbildung und die Bereitschaftspolizei and half a year of training on the job at a Police precinct or station in Schleswig-Holstein. The bulk of the training is however made up by two years of studying at the Fachhochschule für Verwaltung und Diensleistung in Altenholz, where Polizeikommissaranwärter receive theoretical training through university education. During training, Polizeikommissaranwärter have to obtain a bachelor's degree. After three years of training, the Aspiring Police officers are promoted to the rank of Kriminal- or Polizeikommissar.

== History ==
In accordance with Ordinance No. 46 by the British Military Government, the State of Schleswig-Holstein replaced the Province of Schleswig-Holstein on 23 August 1946. Ordinance No. 57 furthermore gave legislative power to the Landtag of Schleswig-Holstein. However, legislation referring to the Police still had to be within the framework of Ordinance No. 135, which listed requirements for legislation related to the Police. On 25 January 1946 the British Military Governor of Schleswig-Holstein approved an Ordinance pertaining to the Reorganisation of the Police in Schleswig-Holstein, the Landtag passed a law subordinating the Landespolizei to the State Government, retroactive from 1 January 1947 on 4 January 1947. The Landespolizei was subordinated to the Ministry of the Interior, which appointed high-ranking Police officers, such as the Department Head, the Landespolizeidirektor.

Training of new Police Officers had begun back in 1946 at Eckernförde-Carlshöhe, on Premises formerly used by the Kriegsmarine. The founding of the Landespolizei in 1947 lead to the integration of the Training facility into the structure of the Police. In 1948, Training was reorganized to be conducted in three detachments of 100 Trainees.

The Polizeigesetz für das Land Schleswig-Holstein vom 23. März 1949 reorganized the Schleswig-Holstein Police into five Police Groups. The Police Group North was responsible for the areas of the modern day Districts of Schleswig-Flensburg, Northern Frisia, Dithmarsh, Rendsburg-Eckernförde and the City of Flensburg. The Police Group South was responsible for the areas of the modern day Districts of Ostholstein, Segeberg, Steinburg, Duchy of Lauenburg, Stormarn, Pinneberg and the City of Neumünster. The Cities of Kiel and Lübeck had their own Police Groups. Each Police Group included the Criminal Investigation Police. The Waterways Police formed a separate Police Group.

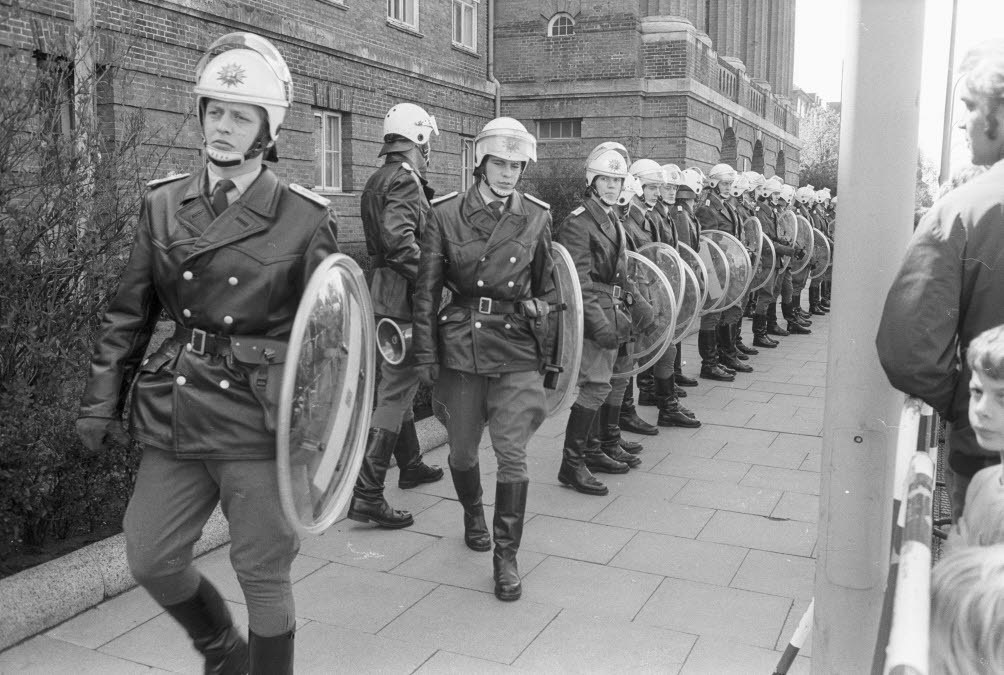
Schleswig-Holstein Riot Police in 1973

After the creation of the Federal Republic of Germany on 23 May 1949, an agreement between the Federal Government and the German states led to the passing of a law pertaining to the creation of Riot Police forces (Bereitschaftspolizei). On 4 July 1951, the first volunteers of the Bereitschaftspolizei moved into premises in Eckernförde-Carlshöhe. Schleswig-Holstein was therefore the first State to fulfill the agreement with the Federal Government.

In July 1950, the Landespolizeischule (State Police Training School) moved from Eckernförde to Kiel.

The Police was reformed again on 22 December 1952 through the Polizeiorganisationsgesetz of 1952 (Police organisation law). However this time, legislation was not bound to the Ordinances of the British Military Government. The Police was now organized into the Schutzpolizei, Criminal Investigation Police (Kriminalpolizei), the Bereitschaftspolizei, and the Waterways Police. The Criminal Investigation Police was subordinated to the Landeskriminalamt, while the Schutzpolizei was subordinated to the Landespolizeiamt.

Since 1 September 1957 the Landespolizei's Training facilities are located in Eutin.

Legislation passed on 18 April 1967 further clarified the responsibilities of the Police in Schleswig-Holstein: According to § 168 LVwG (Version passed on 18 April 1967) those responsibilities are to detect and to avert dangers to Public Order and Safety, and to aid and notify Authorities tasked with Public Safety if necessary, as well as to determine and investigate misdemeanors. (Grounds for the investigation of crimes stem from § 163 StPO)

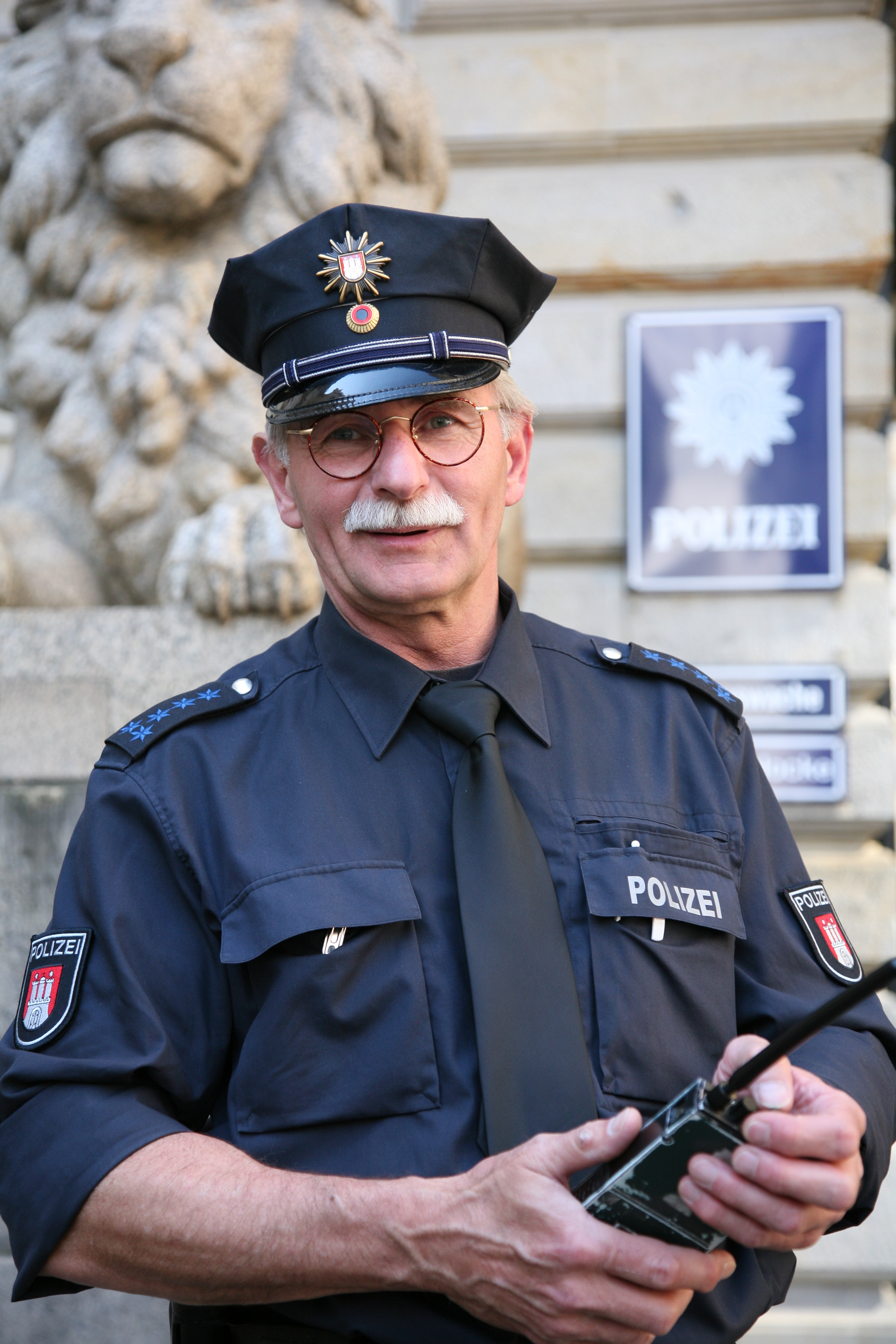
Uniform as used in Schleswig-Holstein

The Polizeiorganisationsgesetz of 1968 (Police organisation law) reformed the Police in Schleswig-Holstein once again. It created four Police Directorates (Polizeidrektionen); Polizeidirektion Mitte, with Headquarters in Kiel, Polizeidirektion Nord, with Headquarters in Flensburg, Polizeidirektion West, with Headquarters in Itzehoe, and Polizeidirektion South, with Headquarters in Lübeck. The Waterways Police formed a separate Police Directorate.

In 1973, the Schleswig-Holstein Police introduced a green-beige Uniform by Designer Heinz Oestergaard, which was in use Nationwide.

Due to increased terrorist activities, such as the attacks of the Rote Armee Fraktion (RAF), on 1 October 1974 then Schleswig-Holstein Minister of the Interior Rudolf Titzck created Special Forces, such as the SEK and MEK.

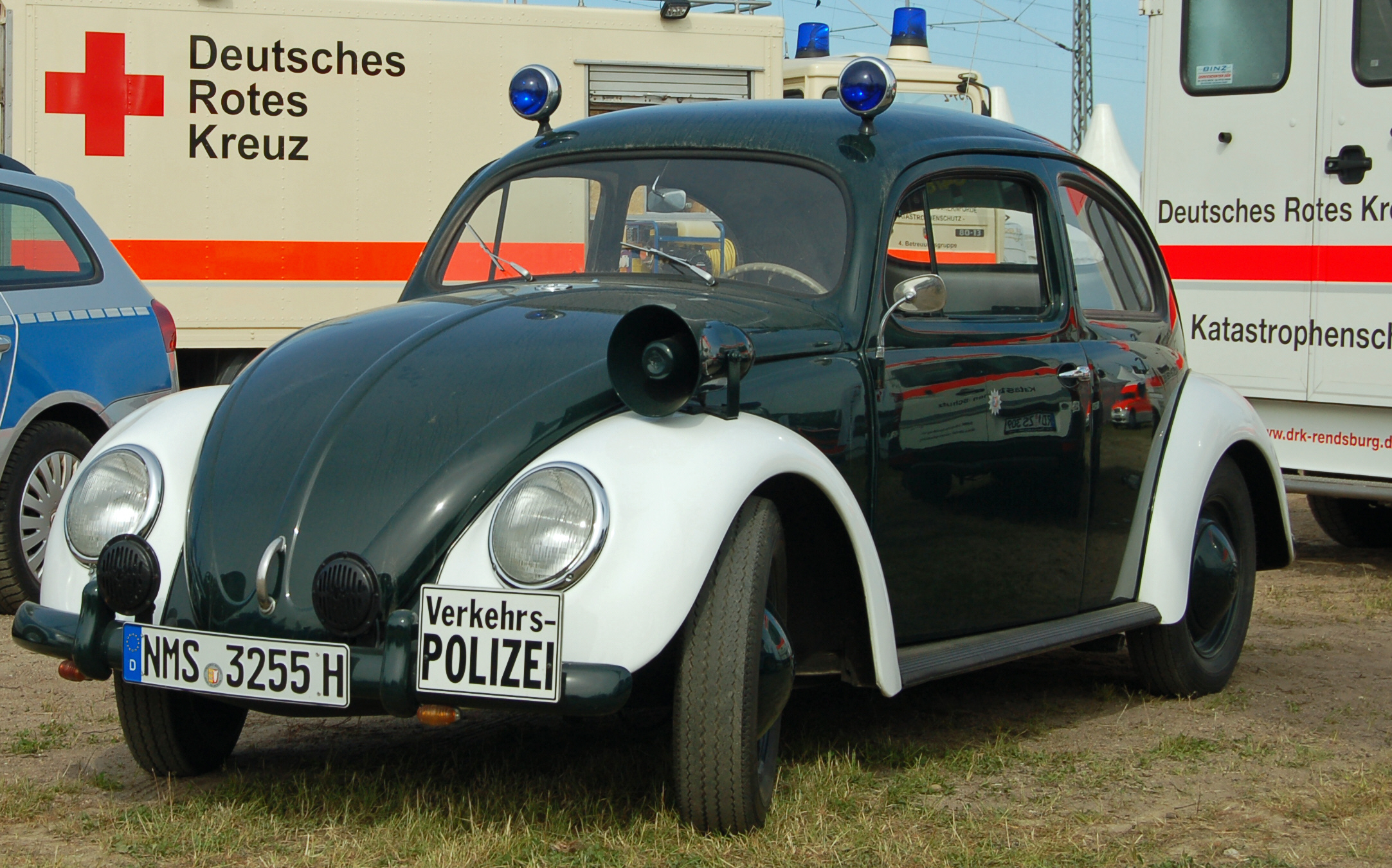
A historic vehicle of the Verkehrspolizei

A Reform of the Polizeiorganisationsgesetz of 1968 in 1994 created an additional independent Traffic Policing Directorate (Verkehrspolizeidirektionen) and the Polizeidirektion für Aus- und Fortbildung und die Bereitschaftspolizei. It also reorganized the Police Directorates into eight Directorates. A Directorate in Kiel, responsible for Kiel and the District of Plön, a Directorate in Flensburg, responsible for Flensburg and the District of Schleswig-Flensburg, a Directorate in Husum, responsible for the District of Northern Frisia, a Directorate in Itzehoe, responsible for the Districts of Steinburg and Ditmarsh, a Directorate in Bad Segeberg, responsible for the Districts of Segeberg and Pinneberg, a Directorate in Lübeck, responsible for Lübeck and the District of Ostholstein, and a Directorate in Ratzeburg, responsible for the Districts of Duchy of Lauenburg and Stormarn. The Directorate of the Waterways Police was dissolved, with the Waterways Police being directly subordinated to the Landespolizeiamt.

The Polizeiorganisationsgesetz of 2004 created the current structure of the Schleswig-Holstein Police.^{(See also: Organisation)} The latest changes to the Polizeiorganisationsgesetz have been made in 2013, which merged the Police Directorate in Husum into the Police Directorate in Flensburg.

In 2006, the Schleswig-Holstein Police introduced a blue Police Uniform, which is used in Hamburg, Lower Saxony, Bremen, Mecklenburg-Vorpommern and Thuringia as well.

In 2021, the Schleswig-Holstein Police hired a Transsexual Person for the first time in its History. Schleswig-Holstein is one of four states in Germany to allow Transsexual Persons to become Police officers.

On 16 January 2024, the Schleswig-Holstein Ministry of the Interior, Municipal Affairs, Housing and Sports announced that the Landespolizeidirektor (Director of State Police) Michael Wilksen would retire 1 June 2024 and be replaced by Dr. Maren Freyher. Freyher was inaugurated on 27. June 2024.
