= Herzogtum Lauenburg – Stormarn-Süd =

Federal electoral district of Germany

10 Herzogtum Lauenburg – Stormarn-Süd
- Electoral district for the Bundestag
- Herzogtum Lauenburg – Stormarn-Süd in 2025
- State: Schleswig-Holstein
- Population: 319,600 (2019)
- Electorate: 246,277 (2021)
- Major settlements: Ahrensburg; Geesthacht; Reinbek
- Area: 1,349.9 km^{2}

Current electoral district
- Created: 1976
- Party: CDU
- Member: Henri Schmidt
- Elected: 2025

Herzogtum Lauenburg – Stormarn-Süd (English: Duchy of Lauenburg – Stormarn-South) is an electoral constituency (German: Wahlkreis) represented in the Bundestag. It elects one member via first-past-the-post voting. Under the current constituency numbering system, it is designated as constituency 10. It is located in southern Schleswig-Holstein, comprising most of the Herzogtum Lauenburg district and southern parts of the Stormarn district.

Herzogtum Lauenburg – Stormarn-Süd was created for the 1976 federal election. From 2021 to 2025, it was represented by Nina Scheer of the Social Democratic Party (SPD). Since 2025 it has been represented by Henri Schmidt of the CDU.

== Geography ==
Herzogtum Lauenburg – Stormarn-Süd is located in southern Schleswig-Holstein. As of the 2021 federal election, it contains all of the Herzogtum Lauenburg district with the exception of the Amt of Berkenthin and the former Amt of Sandesneben (now part of Sandesneben-Nusse). It also includes the southern part of Stormarn district, specifically the Ämter of Siek and Trittau and the urban municipalities of Ahrensburg, Barsbüttel, Glinde, Großhansdorf, Oststeinbek, and Reinbek.

== History ==
Herzogtum Lauenburg – Stormarn-Süd was created in 1976, replacing the abolished constituency of Stormarn – Herzogtum Lauenburg. Originally, it contained the entirety of the Herzogtum Lauenburg district, and a slightly larger part of the Stormarn distract. In the 2002 election, the Ämter of Berkenthin and Sandesneben were transferred to the Lübeck constituency, while the urban municipality of Ammersbek was transferred to the Segeberg – Stormarn-Nord constituency.

Election	No.	Name	Borders
1976	10	Herzogtum Lauenburg – Stormarn-Süd	Herzogtum Lauenburg district; Stormarn district (only Ammersbek, Ahrensburg, Barsbüttel, Glinde, Großhansdorf, Oststeinbek, and Reinbek municipalities and Siek Amt and Trittau Amt)
1980	10	Herzogtum Lauenburg – Stormarn-Süd	Herzogtum Lauenburg district; Stormarn district (only Ammersbek, Ahrensburg, Barsbüttel, Glinde, Großhansdorf, Oststeinbek, and Reinbek municipalities and Siek Amt and Trittau Amt)
1983	10	Herzogtum Lauenburg – Stormarn-Süd	Herzogtum Lauenburg district; Stormarn district (only Ammersbek, Ahrensburg, Barsbüttel, Glinde, Großhansdorf, Oststeinbek, and Reinbek municipalities and Siek Amt and Trittau Amt)
1987	10	Herzogtum Lauenburg – Stormarn-Süd	Herzogtum Lauenburg district; Stormarn district (only Ammersbek, Ahrensburg, Barsbüttel, Glinde, Großhansdorf, Oststeinbek, and Reinbek municipalities and Siek Amt and Trittau Amt)
1990	10	Herzogtum Lauenburg – Stormarn-Süd	Herzogtum Lauenburg district; Stormarn district (only Ammersbek, Ahrensburg, Barsbüttel, Glinde, Großhansdorf, Oststeinbek, and Reinbek municipalities and Siek Amt and Trittau Amt)
1994	10	Herzogtum Lauenburg – Stormarn-Süd	Herzogtum Lauenburg district; Stormarn district (only Ammersbek, Ahrensburg, Barsbüttel, Glinde, Großhansdorf, Oststeinbek, and Reinbek municipalities and Siek Amt and Trittau Amt)
1998	10	Herzogtum Lauenburg – Stormarn-Süd	Herzogtum Lauenburg district; Stormarn district (only Ammersbek, Ahrensburg, Barsbüttel, Glinde, Großhansdorf, Oststeinbek, and Reinbek municipalities and Siek Amt and Trittau Amt)
2002	10	Herzogtum Lauenburg – Stormarn-Süd	Herzogtum Lauenburg district (excluding Berkenthin Amt and former Sandesneben Amt); Stormarn district (only Ahrensburg, Barsbüttel, Glinde, Großhansdorf, Oststeinbek, and Reinbek municipalities and Siek Amt and Trittau Amt)
2005	10	Herzogtum Lauenburg – Stormarn-Süd	Herzogtum Lauenburg district (excluding Berkenthin Amt and former Sandesneben Amt); Stormarn district (only Ahrensburg, Barsbüttel, Glinde, Großhansdorf, Oststeinbek, and Reinbek municipalities and Siek Amt and Trittau Amt)
2009	10	Herzogtum Lauenburg – Stormarn-Süd	Herzogtum Lauenburg district (excluding Berkenthin Amt and former Sandesneben Amt); Stormarn district (only Ahrensburg, Barsbüttel, Glinde, Großhansdorf, Oststeinbek, and Reinbek municipalities and Siek Amt and Trittau Amt)
2013	10	Herzogtum Lauenburg – Stormarn-Süd	Herzogtum Lauenburg district (excluding Berkenthin Amt and former Sandesneben Amt); Stormarn district (only Ahrensburg, Barsbüttel, Glinde, Großhansdorf, Oststeinbek, and Reinbek municipalities and Siek Amt and Trittau Amt)
2017	10	Herzogtum Lauenburg – Stormarn-Süd	Herzogtum Lauenburg district (excluding Berkenthin Amt and former Sandesneben Amt); Stormarn district (only Ahrensburg, Barsbüttel, Glinde, Großhansdorf, Oststeinbek, and Reinbek municipalities and Siek Amt and Trittau Amt)
2021	10	Herzogtum Lauenburg – Stormarn-Süd	Herzogtum Lauenburg district (excluding Berkenthin Amt and former Sandesneben Amt); Stormarn district (only Ahrensburg, Barsbüttel, Glinde, Großhansdorf, Oststeinbek, and Reinbek municipalities and Siek Amt and Trittau Amt)
2025	10	Herzogtum Lauenburg – Stormarn-Süd	Herzogtum Lauenburg district (excluding Berkenthin Amt and former Sandesneben Amt); Stormarn district (only Ahrensburg, Barsbüttel, Glinde, Großhansdorf, Oststeinbek, and Reinbek municipalities and Siek Amt and Trittau Amt)

== Members ==
The constituency was held by the Christian Democratic Union (CDU) from its creation in 1976 until 1980, during which time it was represented by Olaf Baron von Wrangel. It was won by the Social Democratic Party (SPD) in 1980, and represented by Eckart Kuhlwein for a single term. Michael von Schmude regained it for the CDU in 1983, and served as its member until 1998. From 1998 to 2005, it was held by the SPD, during which time it was represented by Thomas Sauer. Carl-Eduard von Bismarck regained it for the CDU in 2005 and served for a single term, before being succeeded by party fellow Norbert Brackmann in 2009. He was re-elected in 2013 and 2017. Nina Scheer won the constituency for the SPD in 2021.

Election	Member	Party	%
1976	Olaf Baron von Wrangel	CDU	46.5
1980	Eckart Kuhlwein	SPD	46.6
1983	Michael von Schmude	CDU	51.6
1987	Michael von Schmude	CDU	48.7
1990	Michael von Schmude	CDU	47.4
1994	Michael von Schmude	CDU	48.0
1998	Thomas Sauer	SPD	47.1
2002	Thomas Sauer	SPD	46.1
2005	Carl-Eduard von Bismarck	CDU	44.4
2009	Norbert Brackmann	CDU	39.9
2013	Norbert Brackmann	CDU	45.2
2017	Norbert Brackmann	CDU	39.5
2021	Nina Scheer	SPD	31.0
2025	Henri Schmidt	CDU	32.7

== Election results ==
=== 2025 election ===
Federal election (2025): Herzogtum Lauenburg – Stormarn-Süd
Notes:	Blue background denotes the winner of the electorate vote. Pink background denotes a candidate elected from their party list. Yellow background denotes an electorate win by a list member, or other incumbent. A ✓ or ✗ denotes status of any incumbent, win or lose respectively.						
Party	Candidate	Votes	%	±%	Party votes	%	±%
CDU	Henri Schmidt	67,641	32.7	▲6.2	61,515	29.7	▲6.5
SPD	✗ Nina Scheer	48,273	23.4	▼7.7	39,860	19.3	▼9.6
AfD	Arnulf Fröhlich	35,419	17.1	▲9.9	35,560	17.2	▲9.7
Greens	Konstantin von Notz	29,012	14.0	▼3.3	28,853	13.9	▼2.7
Left	Marc-André Bornkessel	12,160	5.9	▲3.2	14,253	6.9	▲3.7
FDP	Johannes-Konstantin Basler	7,445	3.6	▼6.9	11,091	5.4	▼8.8
BSW					7,665	3.7	New
SSW					2,732	1.3	▲0.4
Volt	Kristina Scheuber	2,898	1.4	New	1,974	1.0	▲0.7
FW	Christian Runge	3,784	1.8	0.0	1,770	0.9	▼0.3
PARTEI					1,364	0.7	▼0.3
BD					309	0.1	New
MLPD					57	<0.1	0.0
Informal votes		1,443			1,072		
Total valid votes		206,632			207,003		
Turnout		208,075	84.8	▲4.8			
CDU gain from SPD	Majority	19,368	9.3	N/A			

=== 2021 election ===
Federal election (2021): Herzogtum Lauenburg – Stormarn-Süd
Notes:	Blue background denotes the winner of the electorate vote. Pink background denotes a candidate elected from their party list. Yellow background denotes an electorate win by a list member, or other incumbent. A ✓ or ✗ denotes status of any incumbent, win or lose respectively.						
Party	Candidate	Votes	%	±%	Party votes	%	±%
SPD	Nina Scheer	60,593	31.0	▲3.8	56,422	28.8	▲5.6
CDU	Thomas Peters	51,872	26.6	▼12.9	45,364	23.2	▼11.2
Greens	Konstantin von Notz	33,949	17.4	▲7.6	32,475	16.6	▲5.8
FDP	Martin Turowski	20,550	10.5	▲2.3	27,725	14.2	▲0.5
AfD	Wiebke Neumann	14,053	7.2	▼1.9	14,682	7.5	▼2.3
Left	Christoph Hinrichs	5,168	2.6	▼2.5	6,325	3.2	▼3.3
Tierschutzpartei					2,283	1.2	
FW	Christian Runge	3,517	1.8	▲0.7	2,204	1.1	▲0.5
PARTEI	Arne Schönfelder	2,956	1.5		1,791	0.9	▼0.2
dieBasis	Matthias Micklich	2,544	1.3		2,237	1.1	
SSW					1,746	0.9	
Team Todenhöfer					829	0.4	
Volt					447	0.2	
NPD					261	0.1	▼0.1
ÖDP					217	0.1	▼0.1
Humanists					160	0.1	
V-Partei3					155	0.1	
du.					105	0.1	
DKP	Peter Schlüter	125	0.1		82	0.0	
LKR					48	0.0	
MLPD					29	0.0	0.0
Informal votes		1,576			1,316		
Total valid votes		195,327			195,587		
Turnout		196,903	80.0	▲1.0			
SPD gain from CDU	Majority	8,721	4.4				

=== 2017 election ===
Federal election (2017): Herzogtum Lauenburg – Stormarn-Süd
Notes:	Blue background denotes the winner of the electorate vote. Pink background denotes a candidate elected from their party list. Yellow background denotes an electorate win by a list member, or other incumbent. A ✓ or ✗ denotes status of any incumbent, win or lose respectively.						
Party	Candidate	Votes	%	±%	Party votes	%	±%
CDU	✓ Norbert Brackmann	75,737	39.5	▼5.7	66,031	34.4	▼6.2
SPD	Nina Scheer	52,171	27.2	▼7.4	42,815	22.3	▼7.4
Greens	Konstantin von Notz	18,688	9.7	▲2.7	20,826	10.8	▲1.7
AfD	Bruno Hollnagel	17,435	9.1	▲4.5	18,792	9.8	▲4.2
FDP	Bernd Klaus Buchholz (Note: Buchholz was elected on the FDP list, but did not accept his seat. He was replaced by Gyde Jensen.)	15,775	8.2	▲6.1	26,163	13.6	▲7.6
Left	Heidi Beutin	9,785	5.1	▲1.3	12,480	6.5	▲1.6
PARTEI					2,110	1.1	
FW	Gregor Voht	2,174	1.1		1,264	0.7	▲0.2
BGE					525	0.3	
NPD					492	0.3	▼0.5
ÖDP					422	0.2	
MLPD					51	0.0	0.0
Informal votes		1,569			1,363		
Total valid votes		191,765			191,971		
Turnout		193,334	78.9	▲3.1			
CDU hold	Majority	23,566	12.3	▲1.7			

=== 2013 election ===
Federal election (2013): Herzogtum Lauenburg – Stormarn-Süd
Notes:	Blue background denotes the winner of the electorate vote. Pink background denotes a candidate elected from their party list. Yellow background denotes an electorate win by a list member, or other incumbent. A ✓ or ✗ denotes status of any incumbent, win or lose respectively.						
Party	Candidate	Votes	%	±%	Party votes	%	±%
CDU	✓ Norbert Brackmann	81,954	45.2	▲5.3	73,603	40.6	▲7.4
SPD	Nina Scheer	62,749	34.6	▲4.7	53,944	29.7	▲4.3
Greens	Konstantin von Notz	12,774	7.0	▼3.5	16,579	9.1	▼3.3
AfD	Axel Gehrke	8,351	4.6		10,210	5.6	
Left	Ilka Wenzelis	6,834	3.8	▼3.2	8,962	4.9	▼2.8
FDP	Christel Happach-Kasan	3,901	2.2	▼9.0	10,878	6.0	▼11.2
Pirates	Karsten Kiehn	2,908	1.6		3,031	1.7	▼0.2
Tierschutzpartei					1,385	0.8	
NPD	Heinrich Förster	1,356	0.7	▼0.6	1,377	0.8	▼0.4
FW					776	0.4	
Rentner					634	0.3	▼0.5
Independent	Wolfgang Heimann	447	0.2				
MLPD					43	0.0	0.0
Informal votes		1,708			1,560		
Total valid votes		181,274			181,422		
Turnout		182,982	75.8	▼0.7			
CDU hold	Majority	19,205	10.6	▲0.6			

=== 2009 election ===
Federal election (2009): Herzogtum Lauenburg – Stormarn-Süd
Notes:	Blue background denotes the winner of the electorate vote. Pink background denotes a candidate elected from their party list. Yellow background denotes an electorate win by a list member, or other incumbent. A ✓ or ✗ denotes status of any incumbent, win or lose respectively.						
Party	Candidate	Votes	%	±%	Party votes	%	±%
CDU	Norbert Brackmann	70,874	39.9	▼4.5	59,075	33.1	▼4.1
SPD	Gesa Tralau	53,073	29.9	▼14.2	45,354	25.4	▼10.3
FDP	Christel Happach-Kasan	19,742	11.1	▲6.3	30,714	17.2	▲6.0
Greens	Konstantin von Notz	18,761	10.6	▲5.5	22,240	12.5	▲3.3
Left	Lorenz Gösta Beutin	12,351	7.0		13,855	7.8	▲3.4
Pirates					3,248	1.8	
NPD	Kay Oelke	2,330	1.3	▼0.3	2,126	1.2	0.0
Rentner					1,445	0.8	
VIOLETTEN	Achim Robert Keßler-Binder	553	0.3				
DVU					204	0.1	
MLPD					48	0.0	0.0
Informal votes		3,884			3,259		
Total valid votes		177,684			178,309		
Turnout		181,568	76.6	▼5.2			
CDU hold	Majority	17,801	10.0	▲9.7			

=== 2005 election ===
Federal election (2005):Herzogtum Lauenburg – Stormarn-Süd
Notes:	Blue background denotes the winner of the electorate vote. Pink background denotes a candidate elected from their party list. Yellow background denotes an electorate win by a list member, or other incumbent. A ✓ or ✗ denotes status of any incumbent, win or lose respectively.						
Party	Candidate	Votes	%	±%	Party votes	%	±%
CDU	Carl von Bismarck	83,029	44.4	▲2.1	69,894	37.2	▼0.5
SPD	✗ Thomas Sauer	82,387	44.1	▼2.0	67,206	35.8	▼4.2
Greens	Konstantin von Notz	9,499	5.1	▲0.4	17,328	9.2	▼0.6
FDP	Christel Happach-Kasan	8,955	4.8	▼0.5	21,046	11.2	▼3.0
Left					8,203	4.4	▲3.2
NPD	Heinrich Förster	3,078	1.6	▲1.0	2,308	1.2	▲0.9
Familie					1,808	1.0	
MLPD					106	0.1	
Informal votes		3,409			2,458		
Total valid votes		186,948			187,899		
Turnout		190,357	81.8	▼1.5			
CDU gain from SPD	Majority	642	0.3				
