= Brackmann =

Brackmann is a surname. Notable people with the surname include:

- Albert Brackmann (1871–1952), German historian
- Norbert Brackmann (born 1954), German politician
- Oskar Brackmann (1841–1927), Russian politician

== See also ==
- Brackman
