= Henri Schmidt =

German politician

Member of the Bundestag
- Incumbent
- Assumed office 2025
- Preceded by: Nina Scheer
- Constituency: Herzogtum Lauenburg – Stormarn-Süd

Personal details
- Born: 7 May 1983 (age 43) Luckenwalde, Germany (then East Germany)
- Party: Christian Democratic Union

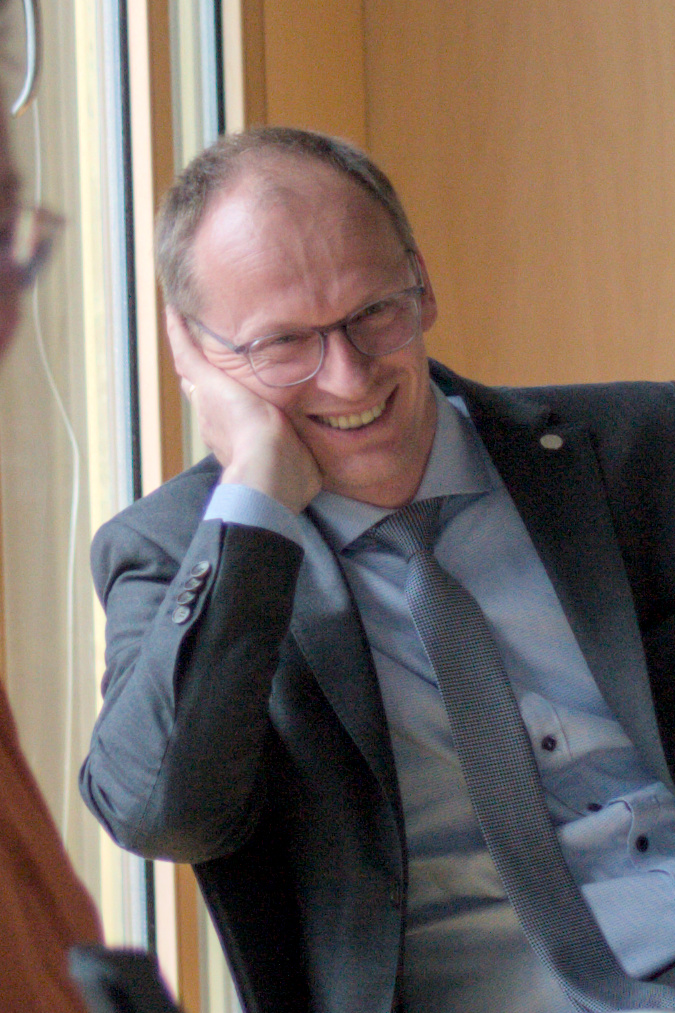
Henri Schmidt

Henri Schmidt (born 7 May 1983) is a German politician from the Christian Democratic Union (CDU). He has been a member of the German Bundestag since 2025.

== Life ==
Schmidt was born in Luckenwalde in 1983. He graduated from high school in 2002. He then began training as an officer in the Air Force in Bayreuth and Fürstenfeldbruck. From 2003 to 2007 he studied political science at the Helmut Schmidt University in Hamburg. He also studied business administration with a focus on human resources management at the AKAD Bildungsgesellschaft in Stuttgart. He completed both courses with a diploma.

After a career in the Air Force, Schmidt moved into business in 2014. Since July 2024, he has been managing director of a medium-sized IT company, for which he had already worked since 2023.

Schmidt is married and has two children. He lives with his family in Barsbüttel.

== Politics ==
Schmidt has been a member of the CDU since 2004. There he initially worked in the Hamburg regional association and worked for more than ten years for the Bundestag member Jürgen Klimke. Since 2018, Schmidt has been a member of the Barsbüttel municipal council and is the CDU parliamentary group leader there. In the 2023 Schleswig-Holstein local elections, he was elected to the Stormarn district council.

Schmidt ran for the 2025 German federal election in the constituency of Herzogtum Lauenburg – Stormarn-Süd. He initially prevailed at the CDU constituency members' meeting against an internal party competitor. At the state representative meeting of the CDU Schleswig-Holstein, Schmidt was also elected to eleventh place on his party's list.

On 23 February 2025, Henri Schmidt won 32.7% of the first votes in the election. This enabled him to recapture the constituency for the CDU after the Social Democratic Party (SPD) candidate Nina Scheer won in 2021, but this time only received 23.4% of the vote. Schmidt received a direct mandate in the 21st German Bundestag through his victory in his constituency.
