= Nina Scheer =

German lawyer and politician

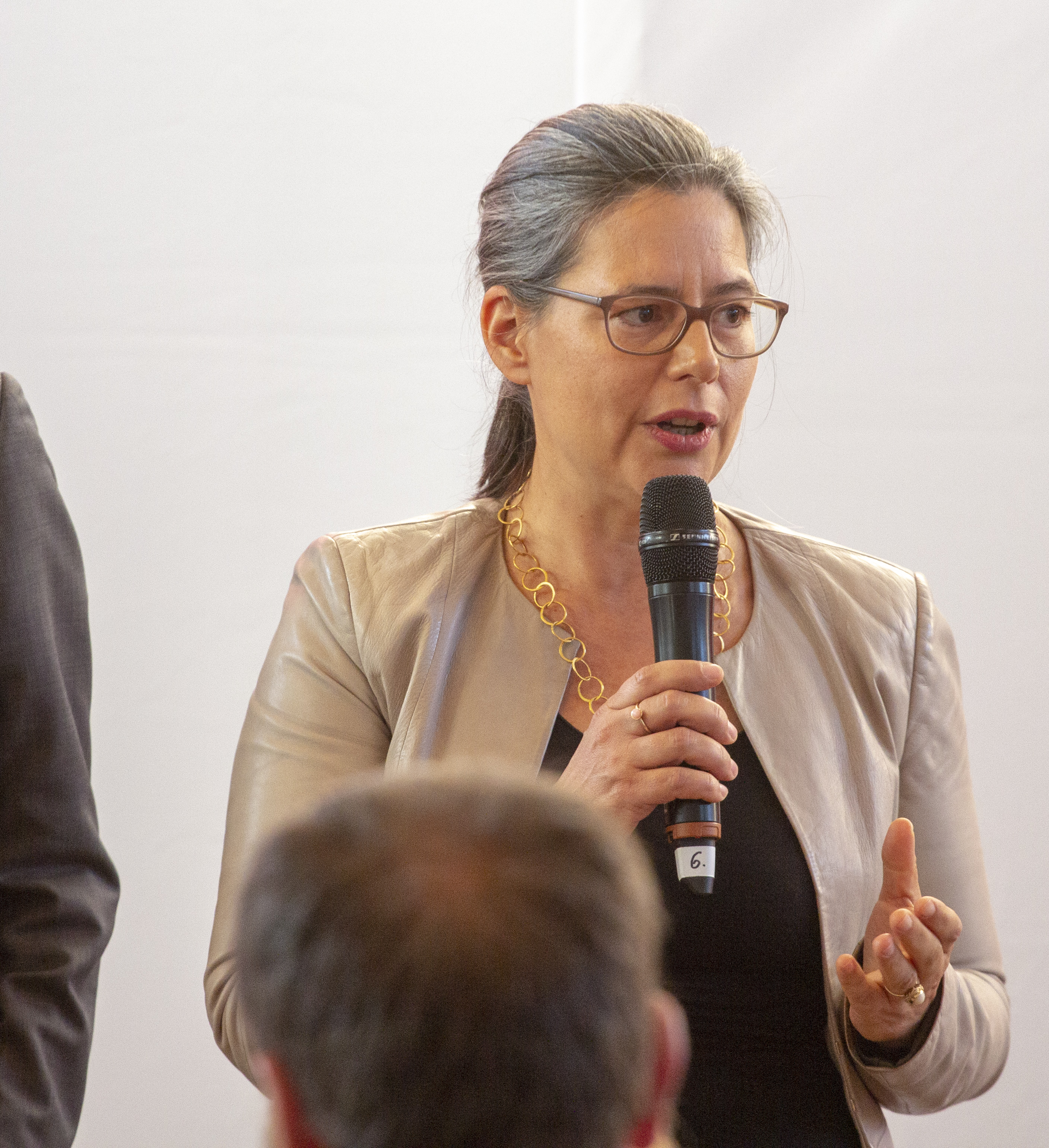
- Scheer in 2019

Member of the Bundestag
- Incumbent
- Assumed office 2013

Personal details
- Born: 11 September 1971 (age 54) Berlin
- Party: SPD
- Children: 1

Nina Scheer (born 11 September 1971) is a German lawyer and politician of the Social Democratic Party (SPD) who has been a member of the Bundestag since 2013. Her political interests include energy policy and climate change. In 2019, Scheer was an unsuccessful candidate in the 2019 Social Democratic Party of Germany leadership election, in a team with Karl Lauterbach. Her father was Hermann Scheer, also a SPD Bundestag member.

== Early life and career ==
Scheer was born in Berlin. From 1991 to 1996 she studied music with a specialization in the violin at the Folkwang University of the Arts in Essen, then studied law at the University of Bonn. In 2008 she obtained a doctorate in political science at the University of Leipzig.

== Political career ==
Scheer has been a member of the German Bundestag since the 2013 elections, standing in the electoral district Herzogtum Lauenburg – Stormarn-Süd, which encompasses the administrative district Duchy of Lauenburg and parts of Stormarn. Though she lost to Norbert Brackmann in both elections, she entered parliament through the SPD's party list.

In parliament, Scheer served on the Committee on the Economic Affairs and Energy from 2014 until 2017 before moving to the Committee on the Environment, Conservation, Building and Nuclear Safety as well as to the Committee on Legal Affairs and Consumer Protection in 2018. In this capacity, she was her parliamentary group's rapporteur on nuclear energy. In addition, she has been a member of the Parliamentary Advisory Board on Sustainable Development since 2018. Since the 2021 elections, Scheer has been serving as her parliamentary group’s spokesperson for climate protection and energy. She also joined the Subcommittee on International Climate and Energy Policy.

Within the SPD parliamentary group, Scheer belongs to the Parliamentary Left, a left-wing movement.

In the negotiations to form a Grand Coalition of Chancellor Angela Merkel's Christian Democrats (CDU together with the Bavarian CSU) and the SPD following the 2013 elections, Scheer was part of the SPD delegation in the working group on energy policy, led by Peter Altmaier and Hannelore Kraft.

Jointly with Karl Lauterbach, Scheer was a candidate in the 2019 Social Democratic Party of Germany leadership election, with an emphasis on combating climate change. The duo was eliminated in the first round of voting with 14.6% of the vote.

In the 2025 German federal election, Scheer won 23.4% of the first votes in the election but lost her constituency to Henri Schmidt from the CDU who won 32.7% of the first votes in the election.

== Other activities ==
=== Government bodies ===
- Nuclear Waste Disposal Fund, Member of the Board of Trustees (since 2017)
- Federal Network Agency for Electricity, Gas, Telecommunications, Post and Railway (BNetzA), Alternate Member of the Advisory Board (since 2014)

=== Non-profit organizations ===
- Agora Energiewende, Member of the Council
- German Renewable Energy Federation (BEE), Member of the Parliamentary Advisory Board
- Eurosolar, Member
- International Association of Lawyers against Nuclear Arms (IALANA), Member
