= Brackman =

Brackman or Brackmann is a surname which may refer to:

== People ==
- Albert Brackmann (1871–1952), German historian
- Andrew Brackman (born 1985), American former Major League Baseball pitcher
- Arnold Brackman (1923–1983), American journalist and author
- Barbara Brackman (born 1945), American quilter and quilt historian
- Constance Brackman (born 2001), Belgian footballer
- Jacob Brackman (born 1943), American journalist, writer, and musical lyricist
- Norbert Brackmann (born 1954), German politician
- Oskar Brackmann (1841–1927), Baltic-German politician
- Robert Brackman (1898–1980), German-American artist

== Fictional characters ==
- Douglas Brackman Jr., a main character in L.A. Law, also his wife Sheila
- Gustaf Brackman, a scientist and political leader in the video game Supreme Commander and its sequels
- Ivan Brackman, a clone of the above in Supreme Commander 2

== See also ==
- House-Brackmann score
