= Schutzpolizei =

Uniformed police in Germany

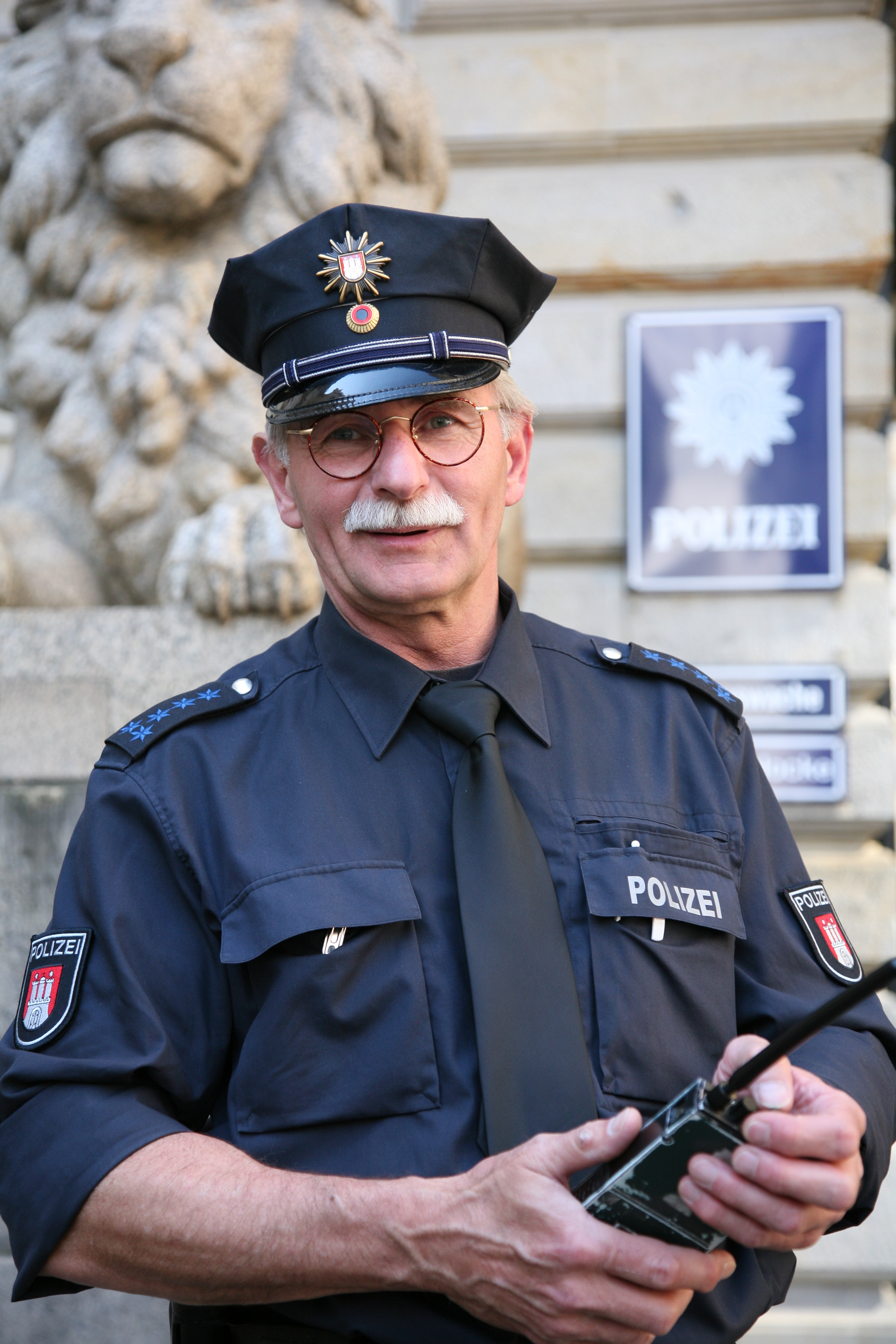
Hamburg Schutzpolizei officer

The Schutzpolizei (German pronunciation: [ˌʃʊt͡spoliˈt͡saɪ]), or Schupo (IPA: [ˈʃuːpo]) for short, is a uniform-wearing branch of the Landespolizei, the state (Land) level police of the states of Germany. Schutzpolizei literally means security or protection police, but it is best translated as uniformed police.

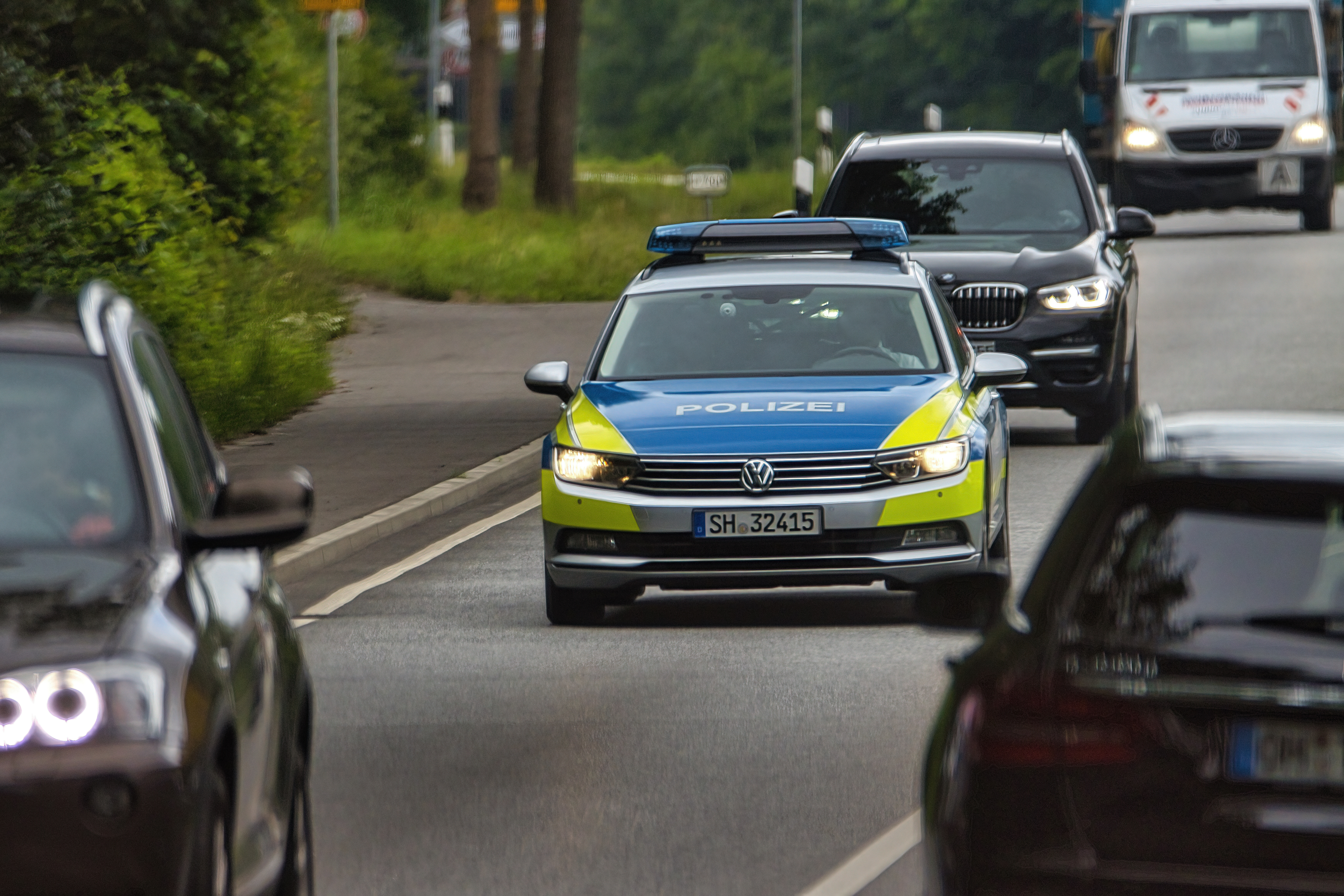
Schleswig-Holstein Police patrol car

The Schutzpolizei has by far the largest number of personnel, is on duty 24 hours per day, and has the broadest range of duties. On patrol duty, mainly in vehicles, they keep their respective area under surveillance.

As in most other countries, the uniformed police in Germany are usually the first to arrive at the scene of an incident, whether it is a crime or an accident. They also take the initial action (Erster Angriff), even if the case is later handed over to investigators of the Kriminalpolizei (Criminal Investigation Police).

Schutzpolizei officers are also responsible for promoting public safety, crime prevention, criminal prosecution and traffic control.
