= Heckler & Koch HK433 =

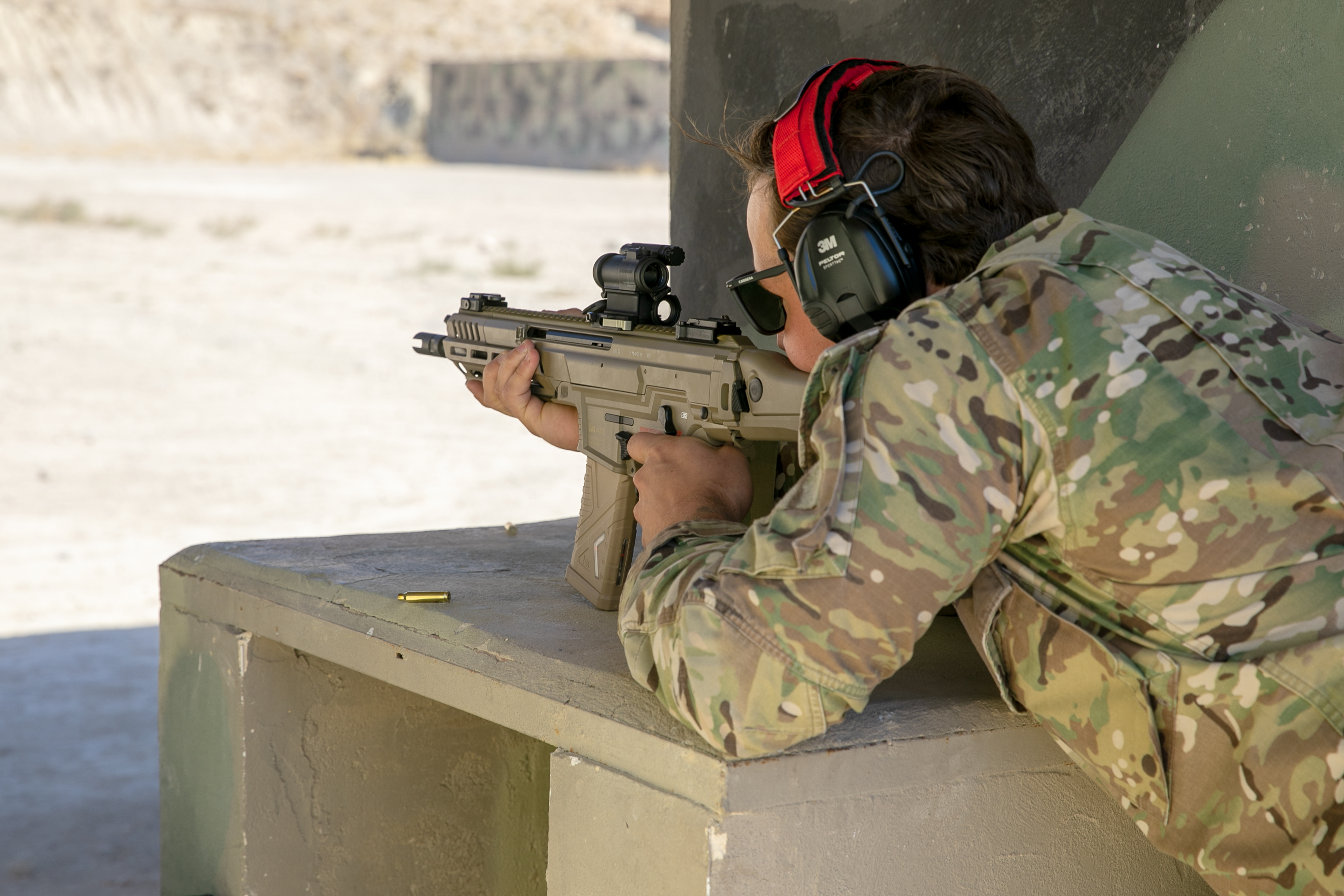
- U.S. Green Berets soldier firing the HK433 assault rifle
- Type: Assault rifle Carbine
- Place of origin: Germany

Service history
- In service: 2024–present
- Wars: Russo-Ukrainian war

Production history
- Designer: Heckler & Koch
- Designed: 2017

Specifications
- Mass: 3.25 kg (7.2 lb) (11"); 3.40 kg (7.5 lb) (14.5"); 3.50 kg (7.7 lb) (16.5")
- Length: 577–843 mm (22.7–33.2 in) (11"); 634–931 mm (25.0–36.7 in) (14.5"); 703–971 mm (27.7–38.2 in) (16.5")
- Barrel length: 280 mm (11 in); 368 mm (14.5 in); 419 mm (16.5 in)
- Width: 81 mm (3.2 in)
- Height: 195 mm (7.7 in)
- Cartridge: 5.56×45mm NATO
- Action: Gas-operated short-stroke piston, rotating bolt
- Rate of fire: 850 rounds/min
- Muzzle velocity: 800 m/s (2,600 ft/s) (11" barrel); 850 m/s (2,800 ft/s) (14.5" barrel); 875 m/s (2,870 ft/s) (16.5" barrel)
- Effective firing range: 500 m (550 yd)
- Feed system: 30-round detachable STANAG magazine
- Sights: Iron sights and Picatinny rails for various optics

The Heckler & Koch HK433 is a modular assault rifle originally chambered for 5.56×45mm which combines features of the G36 and the HK416 families of assault rifles.

== History ==
The HK433 was formally introduced at EnforceTac 2017 on 1 and 2 March in Nürnberg, Bavaria, Germany, after having been shown to a select number of people at SHOT Show in January.

Heckler & Koch offered the HK433 along with the HK416 as a candidate for the German Bundeswehr's competition (System Sturmgewehr Bundeswehr) to select a new assault rifle.

The HK433 has been proposed as a potential successor to the L85 as the next standard service rifle for the British Army under Project GRAYBURN.

== Design details ==
Short-stroke gas piston diagram

The HK433 was designed by Heckler & Koch to offer familiarity to users of either the G36 or HK416. All controls are ambidextrous, and major components are modular, allowing for rifles to be configured in the field as needed.

The HK433 has multiple barrel lengths including 11, 12.5, 14.5, 16.5, 18.9 and 20 inches. All of the barrels are cold hammer forged, hard chrome lined with a 178 mm (1-in-7 inch) right-hand twist, six-groove rifling.

It features a short-stroke gas piston driven system similar to the Heckler & Koch G36 and HK416, with a gas block regulator adjustment located above the barrel. The non-reciprocating charging handle can be changed to operate from either side of the forestock of the rifle, but does not have a locking recess like the Heckler & Koch G3 family of weapons. All other primary controls are ambidextrous.

It has an interchangeable barrel system and a folding adjustable buttstock with a three position cheek riser. Side-folding the buttstock shortens the HK433 by 266–297 mm (10.5–11.7 in). The monolithic upper receiver is made of aluminium alloy, and the lower receiver is made of polymer. It is offered with the option of 2 different lower receivers: one with an AR-15 style magazine release button, and one with a paddle magazine release reminiscent of the G36.

The HK433 features a STANAG 4694 NATO Accessory Rail at 12 o'clock that is backwards-compatible with the STANAG 2324/MIL-STD-1913 Picatinny rail, and a MIL-STD-1913 Picatinny rail at 6 o'clock. Early versions of the riddle features the proprietary HKey accessory attachment system on 3 and 9 o'clock, replaced in production variants by the more commonly used M-LOK system.

The empty weight of a HK433 Draft STANAG 4179 compliant box magazine is approximately 160 g (5.6 oz).

== Variants ==
=== HK437 ===
Chambered in .300 AAC Blackout and featuring 7 and 9 inch barrels.

==== G39 ====
HK437 variant customised for the KSK.

== Configurations ==
=== Current ===
Currently are three configurations of the HK433 and two configurations of the HK437 available:

Variant	Calibre	Length max. mm	Length min. mm	Barrel mm	Weight g
HK433 11"	5.56×45mm	843	577	280	3250
HK433 14.5"	5.56×45mm	931	634	368	3400
HK433 16.5"	5.56×45mm	976	718	421	3500
HK437 Sneaker 9"	.300 Blackout	745	487	178	3040
HK437 Sneaker 11"	.300 Blackout	795	537	229	3140

=== Future ===
While the HK437 was originally announced alongside the HK433 in 2017, there are official sources confirming information about Heckler & Koch expanding the HK433 platform in different caliber variants.

Variant	Calibre	Status
HK433	5.56×45mm	Released
HK437	.300 Blackout	Released
HK231	7.62×51mm	In development (2024-01)
HK231	6.5 Creedmoor	Announced
HK132E	7.62×39mm	In development
HK132E	5.45×39mm	Announced
HK254	9×19mm	In development (2024-01)

== Users ==
- Germany
  - Kommando Spezialkräfte
  - Schleswig-Holstein Police
- Ukraine
  - Main Directorate of Intelligence
