= Glinde, Schleswig-Holstein =

Glinde
- Town
- Coat of arms

- Location of Glinde within Stormarn district
- Interactive map of Glinde
- Location within Germany Location within Schleswig-Holstein
- Coordinates: 53°32′26″N 10°12′40″E
- Country: Germany
- State: Schleswig-Holstein
- District: Stormarn

Government
  - Mayor: Patrick Klose

Area
  - Total: 11.21 km^{2} (4.33 sq mi)
- Elevation: 25 m (82 ft)

Population (2025-12-31)
  - Total: 18,856
  - Density: 1,682/km^{2} (4,357/sq mi)
- Time zone: UTC+01:00 (CET)
  - Summer (DST): UTC+02:00 (CEST)
- Postal codes: 21509
- Dialling codes: 040
- Vehicle registration: OD
- Website: www.glinde.de

Glinde (German pronunciation: [ˈɡlɪndə]; Low German: Glinn) is a town in Germany in southern Schleswig-Holstein, approximately 7 km east of Hamburg.

== History ==
The name Glinde was first mentioned in a document dated from March 25, 1229. In the document Graf Adolf IV. of Schauenburg and Holstein gave the village to a Cistercian convent. (The monastery was later moved to the location of the modern town Reinbek). The King of Denmark and Duke of Schleswig-Holstein, Frederick I of Denmark, took possession of the monastery during the Protestant Reformation. 1544 his son Christian III shared it with his brothers. The affiliation changed several times.

1948, the municipalities Glinde, Oststeinbek, Havighorst and Schönningstedt were amalgamated to the Amt Glinde. After Schönningstedt and subsequently (1949) Havighorst left the association, Glinde and Oststeinbek became independent municipalities in 1978.

On June 24, 1979 (the 750th anniversary of the village), Glinde received its town charter.

Year	1803	1933	1939	1948	1961	1970	1983	1994	2002	2010	2013
Inhabitants	220	544	2.173	5.059	6.738	9.142	14.482	15.839	16.124	16.334	17.922

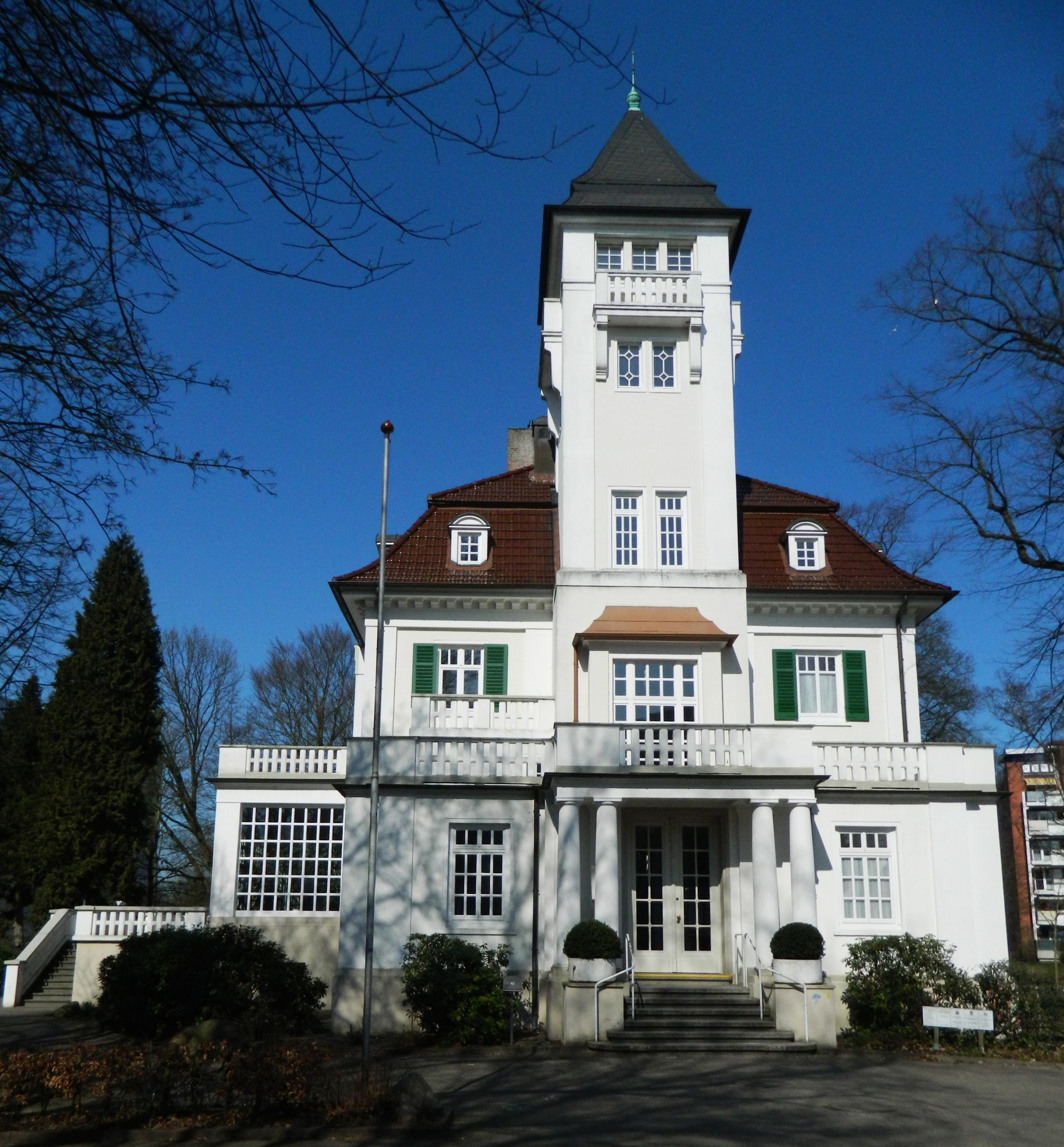
Glinde

== Mayors ==
- -2009:Uwe Rheders
- 2009-2026:Rainhard Zug
- 2026-:Patrick Klose

== Literature ==
- Wolfgang Bachhofer: Glinde. 1929 bis 1979. Eine junge Stadt stellt sich vor. Glinde 1979.
