= Autobahnpolizei =

Highway patrol in Germany

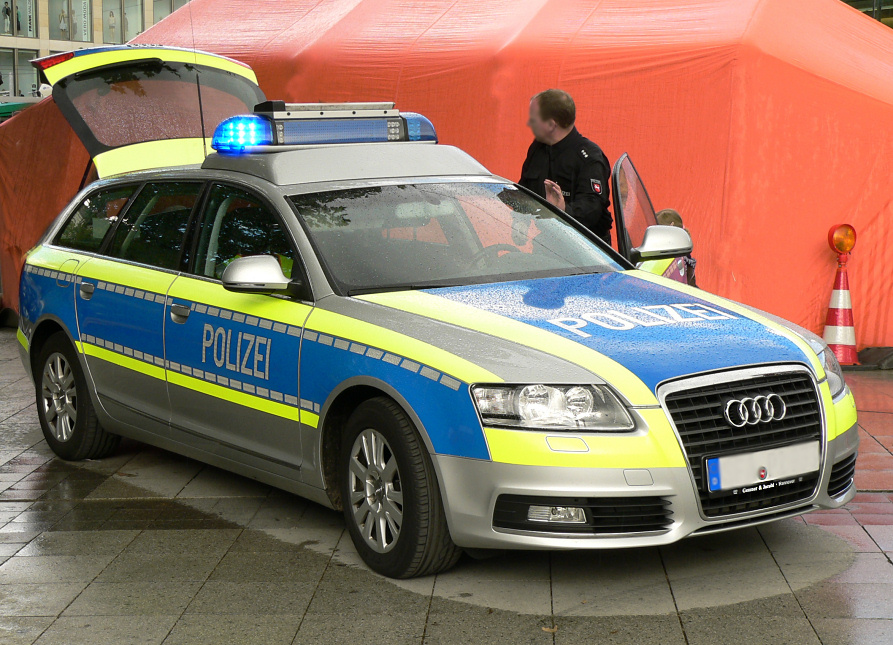
Autobahnpolizei car (Lower Saxony)

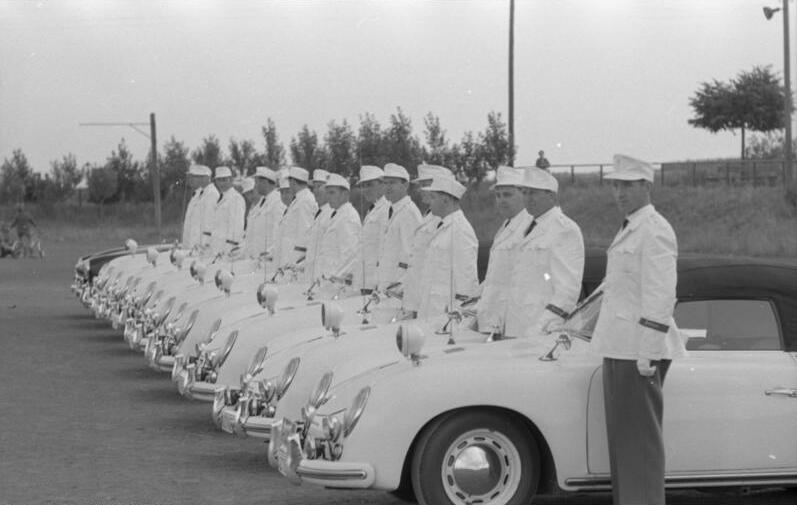
Autobahnpolizei in 1959, standing beside their Porsche 356 police cars

Autobahnpolizei is the term in Germany for the highway patrol. Heavy traffic and high-speed accidents resulted in the creation of special police units to patrol the expressways known as Autobahnen.

== Organisation ==
Although the autobahns are federal roads, the Autobahnpolizei are always part of the state police (Landespolizei in Germany). In Switzerland, the state police (Kantonspolizei) is responsible for highway patrols as well.

== Operations ==
Autobahnpolizei officers facilitate and regulate the flow of traffic, help motorists whose vehicles have broken down on the Autobahn and rapidly respond to accidents. Vehicle safety checks and crime prevention at rest stops are also part of the Autobahnpolizei duties.

Investigation sections probe crime at rest stops and the movement of criminals and smugglers on the Autobahn, often together with German Customs. The Autobahnpolizei also use fast unmarked vehicles with video cameras discreetly mounted front and back to follow and film reckless drivers and speeders. Approximately 30% of autobahns in Germany have a permanent speed limit of 130 km/h (80 mph) or less, primarily in urban areas. On the remainder, the 130 km/h speed limit is only advisory.

== Media ==
- Alarm für Cobra 11 – Die Autobahnpolizei is a German television series about a two-man team of Autobahnpolizei first set in Berlin, later in North Rhine-Westphalia.

== See also ==
- Highway patrol (USA)
- Road policing unit (UK)
- Traffic corps (Ireland)
