= Ordnungsbehörde =

The Ordnungsbehörde, or Department of Order, is a municipal-level law enforcement agency in some states of Germany which has the duty to avert hazards endangering the public security or order. The most apparent Ordnungsbehörde is the Ordnungsamt, whose tasks usually include handing out warnings and tickets for petty offenses.
