= Ammersbek =

- Municipality
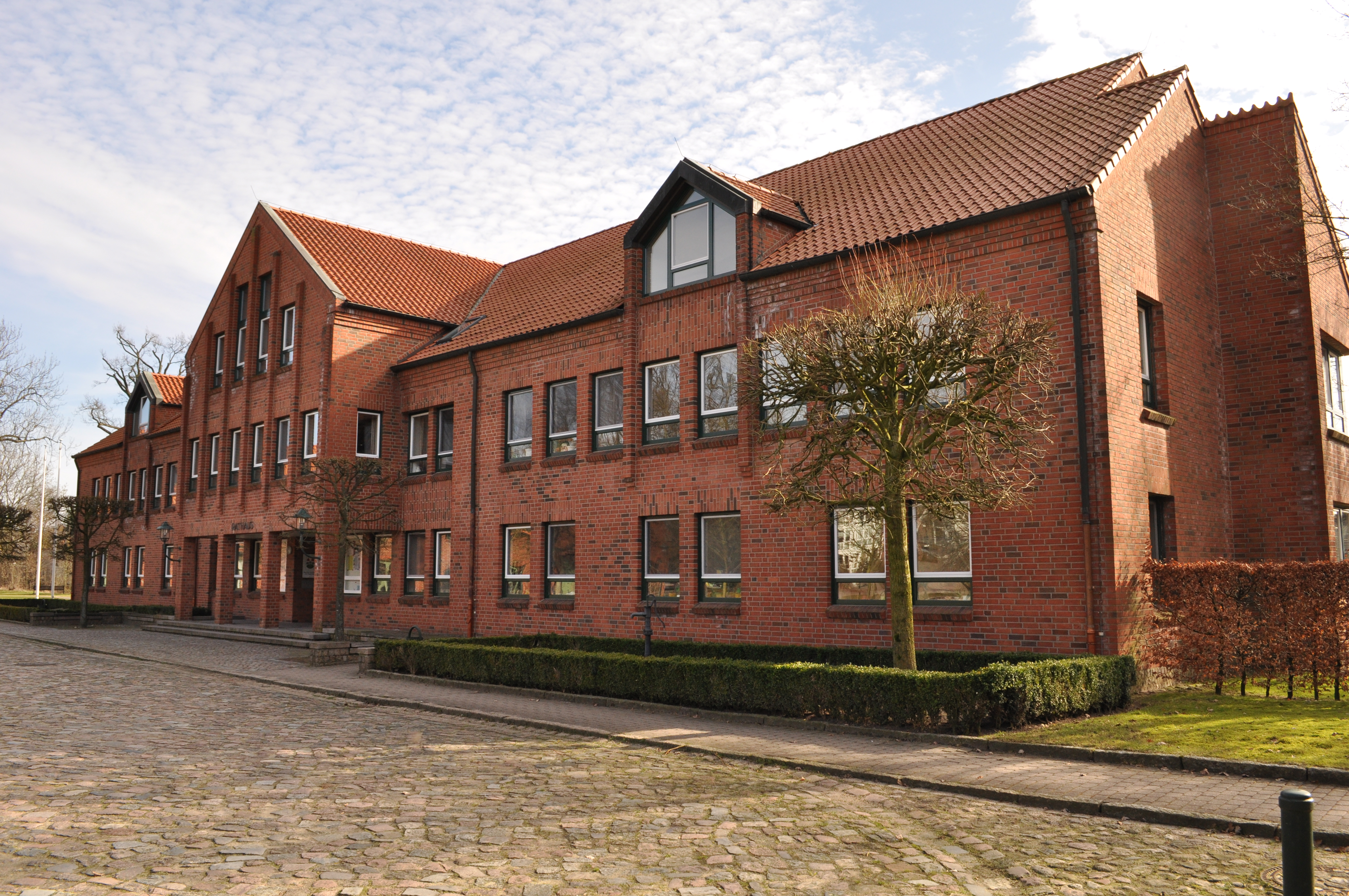
- Town hall

- Coat of arms

- Location of Ammersbek within Stormarn district
- Interactive map of Ammersbek
- Location within Germany Location within Schleswig-Holstein
- Coordinates: 53°42′7″N 10°11′58″E
- Country: Germany
- State: Schleswig-Holstein
- District: Stormarn

Government
  - Mayor: Horst Ansén

Area
  - Total: 17.71 km^{2} (6.84 sq mi)
- Elevation: 30 m (98 ft)

Population (2025-12-31)
  - Total: 10,088
  - Density: 569.6/km^{2} (1,475/sq mi)
- Time zone: UTC+01:00 (CET)
  - Summer (DST): UTC+02:00 (CEST)
- Postal codes: 22949
- Dialling codes: 040, 04102, 04532
- Vehicle registration: OD
- Website: www.ammersbek.de

Ammersbek is a municipality in the district of Stormarn, in Schleswig-Holstein, Germany. It is situated approximately 4 kilometres (2.5 mi) northwest of Ahrensburg, and 23 kilometres (14 mi) northeast of Hamburg, and is considered by many to be a part of Hamburg.
