= Oststeinbek =

- Municipality
- Coat of arms

- Location of Oststeinbek within Stormarn district
- Interactive map of Oststeinbek
- Location within Germany Location within Schleswig-Holstein
- Coordinates: 53°32′39″N 10°9′59″E
- Country: Germany
- State: Schleswig-Holstein
- District: Stormarn
- Subdivisions: 2

Government
  - Mayor: Jürgen Hettwer

Area
  - Total: 11.37 km^{2} (4.39 sq mi)
- Elevation: 25 m (82 ft)

Population (2025-12-31)
  - Total: 9,052
  - Density: 796.1/km^{2} (2,062/sq mi)
- Time zone: UTC+01:00 (CET)
  - Summer (DST): UTC+02:00 (CEST)
- Postal codes: 22113
- Dialling codes: 040
- Vehicle registration: OD
- Website: www.oststeinbek.de

Oststeinbek is a municipality in the district of Stormarn, in Schleswig-Holstein, Germany. It is situated approximately 13 kilometres east of the center of Hamburg, directly on the border between Hamburg and Schleswig-Holstein.

First mentioned in 1254 it celebrated its 750th anniversary in 2004.

As of 2011, Oststeinbek had about 8600 inhabitants.
