= Norbert Brackmann =

German politician (born 1954)

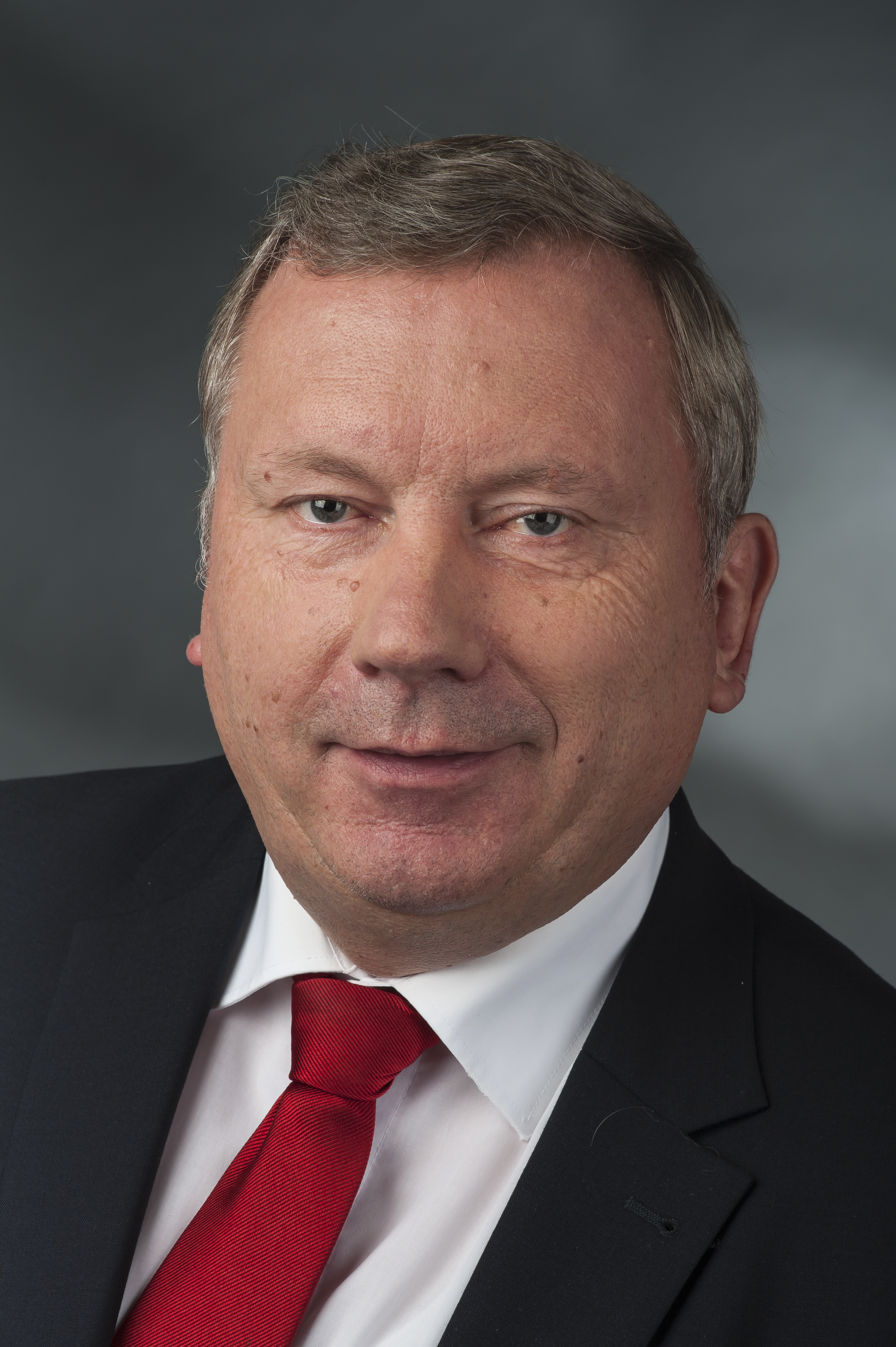

Member of the Bundestag
- Incumbent
- Assumed office 2009

Personal details
- Born: 30 August 1954 (age 72) Lauenburg, Schleswig-Holstein, West Germany (now Germany)
- Party: Christian Democratic Union
- Education: University of Kiel

Norbert Brackmann (born 30 August 1954) is a German politician of the Christian Democratic Union (CDU) who was a member of the German Bundestag from 2009 to 2021, representing as a directly elected member the constituency of Duchy of Lauenburg - Stormarn-South.

In addition to his parliamentary work, Brackmann served as Coordinator of the Federal Government for the Maritime Industry from 2018 until 2021.

== Education and early career ==
Brackmann was born in Lauenburg, and graduated from high school in 1973 at the Lauenburgische Gelehrtenschule in Ratzeburg. He then served as a two-year regular soldier, latterly as a platoon commander of a repair company. Beginning in 1975, he studied law at the Christian Albrechts University Kiel, which he finished in 1979 with the first state examination and after completion of the legal clerkship in 1982 with the second state law exam.

Since 1982 Brackmann worked at the NDR public broadcaster in Hamburg. First he served as speaker of the Program Director for Radio, from 1985 to 2000 as Head of the Department of Radio Broadcasting. From 2000 he headed the department New Media, which he previously built up as the administrative office of the director. In this role, he was responsible for the Internet and teletext offerings of the NDR, the ARD digital platform tagesschau.de, and the intranet of the NDR. He is on leave since his election to the German Bundestag.

In 2000, Brackmann co-founded the media company Digitalradio Nord GmbH, and was one of its managing directors until 2010.

== Political career ==
=== Career in local politics ===
Norbert Brackmann has been active in municipal politics since 1975 in the Duchy of Lauenburg district. Since 1978 he has been a member of the Lauenburg district council without interruption. From 1986 to 1990 and since 1998 he has been chairman of the CDU district council group. From 1990 to 1994 Brackmann was county president. In this capacity, he was also in 1992 in the Enquete Commission of the Schleswig-Holstein Landtag for municipal constitutional reform, whose deputy chairman he was.

=== Member of Parliament, 2009–present ===
Since the election to the German Bundestag in 2009, Brackmann has been a member of the German Bundestag. In his first two legislative terms, he was a member of the Budget Committee and as rapporteur for the budget of the Federal Ministry of Finance and the budget of the Federal Agency for Real Estate Tasks. After the 2013 federal election, he was also appointed by the Federal Minister of Finance as Deputy Chairman of the Board of Directors of the Federal Agency for Real Estate. In addition, he became chairman of the Federal Financing Committee of the Committee on Budgets and a member of the Audit Committee.

At the beginning of 2015, Brackmann was elected chairman and deputy budget spokesman by the CDU/CSU parliamentary group's budget working group. The election also saw a change in coverage. Since then, Brackmann was rapporteur for the budget of the Federal Ministry of Transport and Digital Infrastructure. In this capacity, among others, he helped design the law reform to found a motorway company.

After the 2017 elections, Brackmann was again a member of the Budget Committee, chairman of the CDU / CSU Group in the Budget Committee and rapporteur for the budget of the Federal Ministry of Transport. At the same time, he was elected by the members of the Committee on Budgets as chairman of the Audit Committee after the CDU / CSU faction had reclaimed the post.

In May 2020, Brackmann announced that he would not stand in the 2021 federal elections but instead resign from active politics by the end of the parliamentary term.

== Other activities ==
- Otto-von-Bismarck-Stiftung, Chair of the Board of Trustees (since 2022)

== Personal life ==
Brackmann is a Catholic, married to Gritta geb. Meifort and father of two grown-up sons.
