= Barsbüttel =

- Municipality
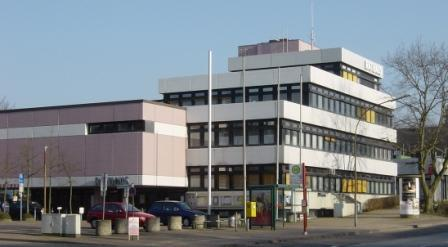
- Town hall

- Coat of arms

- Location of Barsbüttel within Stormarn district
- Interactive map of Barsbüttel
- Location within Germany Location within Schleswig-Holstein
- Coordinates: 53°34′08″N 10°10′16″E
- Country: Germany
- State: Schleswig-Holstein
- District: Stormarn

Government
  - Mayor: Thomas Schreitmüller

Area
  - Total: 24.68 km^{2} (9.53 sq mi)
- Elevation: 31 m (102 ft)

Population (2025-12-31)
  - Total: 13,342
  - Density: 540.6/km^{2} (1,400/sq mi)
- Time zone: UTC+01:00 (CET)
  - Summer (DST): UTC+02:00 (CEST)
- Postal codes: 22885
- Dialling codes: 040
- Vehicle registration: OD
- Website: www.barsbuettel.de

Barsbüttel is a municipality in the district of Stormarn, in Schleswig-Holstein, Germany. It is situated east of Hamburg on the border of the district of Jenfeld.

Since 1973 the township has consisted of four districts: Barsbüttel (main village), Willinghusen, Stemwarde and Stellau.

== Education ==
The community contains two elementary schools, one in Barsbüttel and one in Willinghusen. Older students may attend the Erich Kästner Gemeinschaftsschule, which has a bilingual program for students in grades 5 through 10.

The Volkshochshule Barsbüttel offers adult education courses in school and municipal buildings across the four districts.

== Twin towns ==
- Keila, Estonia
- Graal-Müritz, Germany
- Guipavas, France
- Callington, Cornwall, United Kingdom.

== Notable people ==
- Wilhelm Mohnke – Schutzstaffel general, lived here after being released from prison from 1955 to 2001.
