= Powerwolf discography =

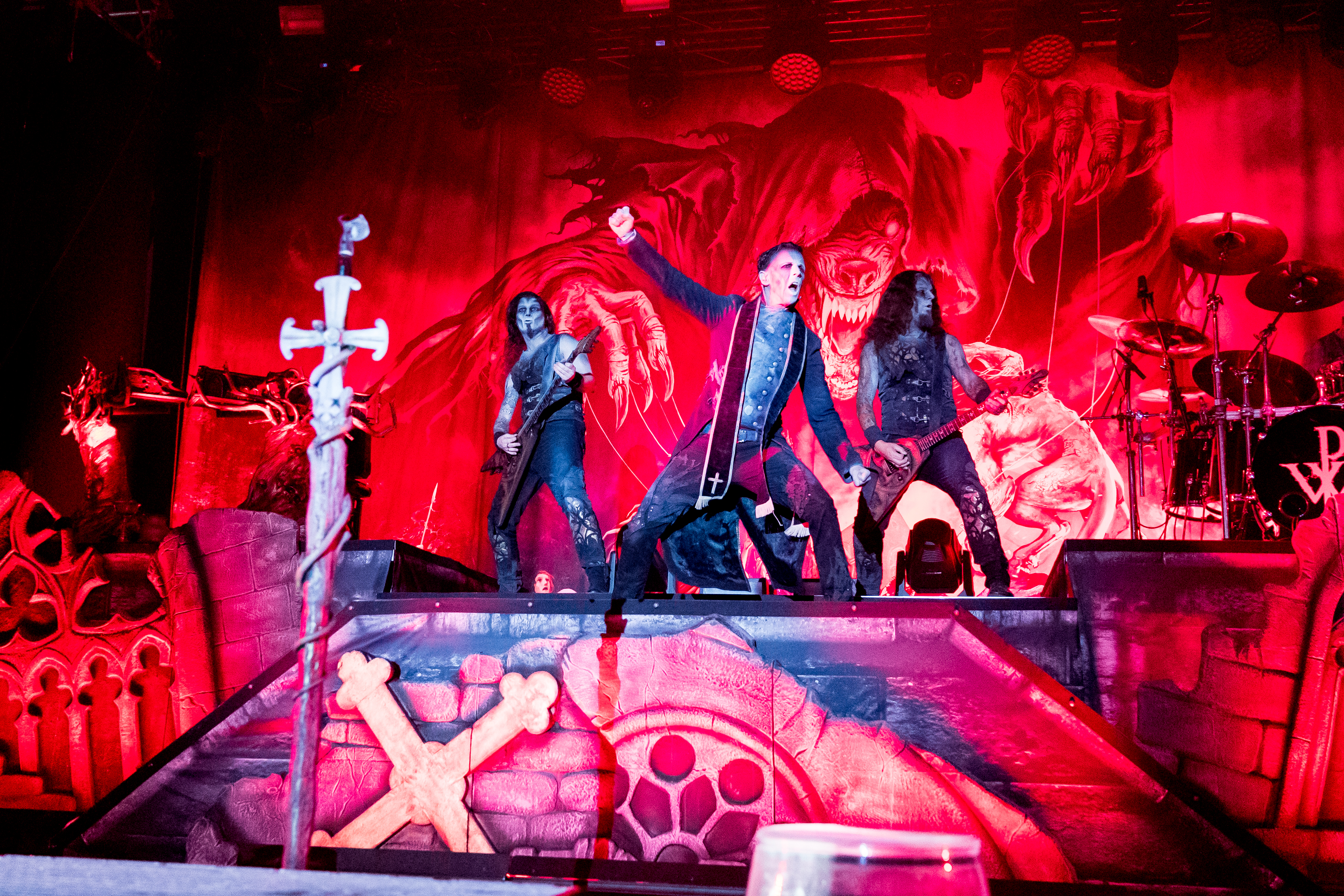
- Powerwolf performing in 2019
- Studio albums: 10
- EPs: 3
- Live albums: 5
- Singles: 20
- Video albums: 2
- Music videos: 57

The German power metal band Powerwolf has released nine studio albums, five live albums, two video albums, three EPs, three box sets, two compilation albums, nineteen singles, and fifty-seven music videos.

== Albums ==
=== Studio albums ===
| Title | Album details | Peak chart positions | | | | | | | | | | Certifications |
| Title | Album details | GER | AUT | BEL (FL) | BEL (WA) | FIN | HUN | NLD | POL | SWE | SWI | Certifications |
|---|---|---|---|---|---|---|---|---|---|---|---|---|
| Return in Bloodred | Released: 4 April 2005; Label: Metal Blade; Formats: CD, LP, digital download | — | — | — | — | — | — | — | — | — | — | |
| Lupus Dei | Released: 7 May 2007; Label: Metal Blade; Formats: CD, LP, digital download | — | — | — | — | — | — | — | — | — | — | |
| Bible of the Beast | Released: 24 April 2009; Label: Metal Blade; Formats: CD, LP, digital download | 76 | — | — | — | — | — | — | — | — | — | |
| Blood of the Saints | Released: 29 July 2011; Label: Metal Blade; Formats: CD, LP, digital download | 18 | — | — | — | — | — | — | — | — | 75 | |
| Preachers of the Night | Released: 19 July 2013; Label: Napalm; Formats: CD, LP, digital download | 1 | 24 | 105 | 97 | 49 | — | — | — | 50 | 23 | |
| Blessed & Possessed | Released: 17 July 2015; Label: Napalm; Formats: CD, LP, digital download | 3 | 17 | 41 | 59 | 30 | 26 | 70 | — | 46 | 10 | CZE: Gold |
| The Sacrament of Sin | Released: 20 July 2018; Label: Napalm; Formats: CD, LP, digital download | 1 | 9 | 8 | 16 | 16 | 17 | 94 | 34 | — | 4 | CZE: Gold |
| Call of the Wild | Released: 16 July 2021; Label: Napalm; Formats: CD, LP, digital download | 2 | 5 | 15 | 25 | 11 | — | 16 | 24 | — | 5 | |
| Interludium | Released: 7 April 2023; Label: Napalm; Formats: CD, LP, digital download | 3 | 6 | 48 | 138 | — | — | — | 92 | — | 5 | |
| Wake Up the Wicked | Released: 26 July 2024; Label: Napalm; Formats: CD, LP, digital download | 1 | 1 | 26 | 75 | — | — | 56 | 14 | — | 4 | |

=== Live albums ===
| Title | Album details | Peak chart positions | |
| Title | Album details | GER | NLD |
|---|---|---|---|
| Alive in the Night | Released: 13 March 2012; Label: Metal Blade; Formats: CD | — | — |
| The Metal Mass – Live | Released: 29 July 2016; Label: Napalm; Formats: CD, LP, digital download | 4 | 30 |
| Preaching at the Breeze | Released: 6 January 2017; Label: Napalm; Formats: CD | — | — |
| The Monumental Mass – A Cinematic Metal Event | Released: 8 July 2022; Label: Napalm; Formats: CD, LP, digital download, DVD, Blu-ray | 1 | — |
| Wildlive (Live At Olympiahalle) | Released: 13 February 2026; Label: Napalm; Formats: CD, digital download, DVD, Blu-ray | 1 | — |

=== Compilation albums ===
| Title | Album details | Peak chart positions | | | | |
| Title | Album details | GER | AUT | BEL (FL) | BEL (WA) | SWI |
|---|---|---|---|---|---|---|
| Metallum Nostrum | Released: 11 January 2019 (Note: Re-release, cover album originally released as a bonus disc to Blessed & Possessed.); Label: Napalm; Formats: CD, LP, digital download | 67 | — | — | 165 | — |
| Best of the Blessed | Released: 3 July 2020; Label: Napalm; Formats: CD, LP, digital download | 2 | 28 | 40 | 14 | 9 |

=== Box sets ===
| Title | Album details |
|---|---|
| Trinity in Black | Released: 6 May 2011; Label: Metal Blade; Formats: CD, LP |
| The History of Heresy I | Released: 23 May 2014; Label: Metal Blade; Formats: CD, DVD |
| The History of Heresy II | Released: 24 October 2014; Label: Metal Blade; Formats: CD |

== Extended plays ==
| Title | EP details |
|---|---|
| Wolfsnächte 2012 Tour EP | Released: 13 December 2011; Label: Metal Blade; Formats: CD |
| The Rockhard Sacrament | Released: 22 June 2013; Label: Napalm; Formats: CD |
| Wolfsnächte 2015 Tour EP | Released: 2015; Label: Napalm; Formats: CD |

== Singles ==
| Title | Year | Certifications | Album |
|---|---|---|---|
| "In Blood We Trust" | 2007 | | Lupus Dei |
| "Raise Your Fist, Evangelist" | 2009 | | Bible of the Beast |
| "Sanctified with Dynamite" | 2011 | | Blood of the Saints |
| "We Drink Your Blood" | 2011 | | Blood of the Saints |
| "Amen & Attack" | 2013 | | Preachers of the Night |
| "Army of the Night" | 2015 | | Blessed & Possessed |
| "Armata Strigoi" | 2015 | | Blessed & Possessed |
| "Demons Are a Girl's Best Friend" | 2018 | CZE: Platinum | The Sacrament of Sin |
| "Midnight Madonna" | 2018 | | The Sacrament of Sin |
| "Fire & Forgive" | 2018 | | The Sacrament of Sin |
| "Incense & Iron" | 2018 | | The Sacrament of Sin |
| "Kiss of the Cobra King" | 2019 | CZE: Gold, Platinum | Best of the Blessed |
| "Werewolves of Armenia" | 2020 | | Best of the Blessed |
| "Sanctified with Dynamite" (live) | 2020 | | Best of the Blessed |
| "Beast of Gévaudan" | 2021 | | Call of the Wild |
| "Dancing with the Dead" | 2021 | CZE: Platinum | Call of the Wild |
| "Sainted by the Storm" | 2022 | | Interludium |
| "My Will Be Done" | 2022 | | Interludium |
| "1589" | 2024 | | Wake Up the Wicked |

== Videography ==
=== Video albums ===
| Title | Album details | Peak chart positions | | |
| Title | Album details | AUT | BEL (FL) | BEL (WA) |
|---|---|---|---|---|
| The Wacken Worship | Released: 2008; Label: Metal Blade; Formats: DVD | — | — | — |
| The Metal Mass – Live | Released: 27 July 2016; Label: Napalm; Formats: DVD, Blu-ray, digital download | 5 | 5 | 2 |

=== Music videos ===
| Title | Year | Director(s) | Ref. |
|---|---|---|---|
| "We Drink Your Blood" | 2011 | Carlo Oppermann | |
| "Sanctified with Dynamite" | 2012 | Carlo Oppermann | |
| "Amen & Attack" | 2013 | Carlo Oppermann | |
| "Army of the Night" | 2015 | Carlo Oppermann | |
| "Armata Strigoi" | 2015 | Unknown | |
| "Out in the Fields" (Gary Moore Cover) | 2015 | Unknown | |
| "Demons Are a Girl's Best Friend" | 2018 | Matteo Vdiva Fabbiani | |
| "Fire & Forgive" | 2018 | Matteo Vdiva Fabbiani | |
| "Killers with the Cross" | 2018 | Matteo Vdiva Fabbiani | |
| "Incense & Iron" | 2018 | Unknown | |
| "The Sacrament of Sin" | 2018 | Unknown | |
| "Stossgebet" | 2018 | Christian Ripkens | |
| "Where the Wild Wolves Have Gone" | 2018 | Christian Ripkens | |
| "Kiss of the Cobra King" | 2019 | Matteo Vdiva Fabbiani | |
| "Nightside of Siberia" | 2019 | Christian Ripkens | |
| "Werewolves of Armenia" (New Version 2020) | 2020 | Unknown | |
| "Night of the Werewolves" | 2020 | Unknown | |
| "Sanctified with Dynamite" (Live) | 2020 | Christian Ripkens | |
| "Blessed and Possessed" | 2020 | Unknown | |
| "Resurrection by Erection" (New Version 2020) | 2020 | Unknown | |
| "Sacramental Sister" | 2020 | Unknown | |
| "Venom of Venus | 2021 | Unknown | |
| "The Sacrament of Sin" | 2021 | Unknown | |
| "Beast of Gévaudan" | 2021 | Matteo Vdiva Fabbiani & Chiara Cerami | |
| "Dancing with the Dead" | 2021 | Matteo Vdiva Fabbiani & Chiara Cerami | |
| "Bête du Gévaudan" | 2021 | Unknown | |
| "Blood for Blood (Faoladh) | 2021 | Unknown | |
| "Faster than the Flame" | 2021 | Ingo Spörl | |
| "Alive or Undead" | 2021 | Ingo Spörl | |
| "Sermon of Swords" | 2021 | Ingo Spörl | |
| "Reverent of Rats" | 2021 | Ingo Spörl | |
| "Fire and Forgive" (The Monumental Mass) | 2021 | Jörg Michael | |
| "Sainted by the Storm" | 2022 | Unknown | |
| "Venom of Venus" (The Monumental Mass) | 2022 | Jörg Michael | |
| "Glaubenskraft" (The Monumental Mass) | 2022 | Jörg Michael | |
| "Incense and Iron" (Live) | 2022 | Unknown | |
| "We Drink Your Blood" (Live) | 2022 | Unknown | |
| "Demons are a Girl's Best Friend" (The Monumental Mass) | 2022 | Jörg Michael | |
| "Cardinal Sin" (The Monumental Mass) | 2022 | Jörg Michael | |
| "My Will Be Done" | 2022 | Matteo Vdiva Fabbiani & Chiara Cerami | |
| "Saturday Satan" (New Version 2020) | 2022 | Unknown | |
| "We Drink Your Blood" (New Version 2020) | 2022 | Unknown | |
| "Poison" (Alice Cooper Cover) | 2023 | Unknown | |
| "No Prayer at Midnight" | 2023 | Matteo Vdiva Fabbiani & Chiara Cerami | |
| "No Prayer at Midnight" | 2023 | Unknown | |
| "Where the Wild Wolves Have Gone" (Live) | 2023 | Unknown | |
| "Wolves of War" | 2023 | Unknown | |
| "Bark at the Moon" (Ozzy Osbourne Cover) | 2023 | Unknown | |
| "1589" | 2024 | Adam Barker | |
| "Sinners of the Seven Seas" | 2024 | Matteo Vdiva Fabbiani & Chiara Cerami | |
| "We Don't Wanna Be No Saints" | 2024 | Matteo Vdiva Fabbiani & Chiara Cerami | |
| "Thunderpriest" | 2024 | Unknown | |
| "Joan of Arc" | 2025 | Unknown | |
| "Stossgebet" (Live at Olympiahalle) | 2025 | Unknown | |
| "Armata Strigoi" (Live at Olympiahalle) | 2025 | Unknown | |
| "Alive or Undead" (Live at Olympiahalle) | 2025 | Unknown | |
| "1589" (Live at Olympiahalle) | 2026 | Unknown | |
