= Wolfsnächte Tour 2013 =

2013 concert tour by Powerwolf

- Tour by Powerwolf
- Location: Europe
- Associated album: Preachers of the Night
- Start date: 26 September 2013
- End date: 3 November 2013
- No. of shows: 20
- Supporting acts: Majesty, Battle Beast, Ashes of Ares, Wisdom

Powerwolf concert chronology
- Wolfsnächte Tour 2012 (2012); Wolfsnächte Tour 2013 (2013); Wolfsnächte Tour 2015 (2015)

The Wolfsnächte Tour 2013 was a European concert tour by German power metal band Powerwolf. Supporting the release of their fifth studio album Preachers of the Night, the tour ran from 26 September 2013 to 3 November 2013, taking place in France, United Kingdom, Germany, Netherlands, Switzerland, Czech Republic and Belgium.

== Background ==
Powerwolf's fifth album Preachers of the Night was released on 19 July 2013. The tour dates were announced in April 2013. Majesty, Battle Beast, Ashes of Ares and Wisdom served a series of opening acts for Powerwolf during the tour. The tour was set to begin on 26 September 2013 at the Le Divan du Monde in Paris, France. It was set to end on 3 November 2013 at Baroeg in Rotterdam, Netherlands.

== Set list ==
This setlist is representative of the show on 29 October 2013 in Prague, Czech Republic, at the Retro Music Hall. It does not represent all dates throughout the tour.

1. "Lupus Daemonis" (Note: Song played from tape.)
2. "Sanctified with Dynamite"
3. "Prayer in the Dark"
4. "Amen & Attack"
5. "All We Need Is Blood"
6. "Sacred & Wild"
7. "Resurrection by Erection"
8. "Coleus Sanctus"
9. Drum solo
10. "Kreuzfeuer"
11. "Werewolves of Armenia"
12. "Dead Boys Don't Cry"
13. "We Drink Your Blood"
14. "Lupus Dei"
15. "Opening: Prelude to Purgatory" (Note: Song played from tape.)
16. "Raise Your Fist, Evangelist"
17. "Saturday Satan"
18. "In the Name of God (Deus Vult)"
19. "Wolves Against the World" (Note: Song played from tape.)

== Tour dates ==
List of concerts, showing date, city, country, and venue
Date	City	Country	Venue
26 September 2013	Paris	France	Le Divan du Monde
27 September 2013	London	United Kingdom	Camden Underworld
28 September 2013	Osnabrück	Germany	Rosenhof
29 September 2013	Nijmegen	Netherlands	Doornroosje
1 October 2013	Langen	Germany	Neue Stadthalle
2 October 2013	Pratteln	Switzerland	Z7
3 October 2013	Lindau	Germany	Vaudeville
4 October 2013	Munich	Germany	Backstage
5 October 2013	Stuttgart	Germany	LKA
19 October 2013	Saarbrücken	Germany	Garage
24 October 2013	Cologne	Germany	Essigfabrik
25 October 2013	Hamburg	Germany	Markthalle
26 October 2013	Speyer	Germany	Halle 101
27 October 2013	Hanover	Germany	Faust
29 October 2013	Prague	Czech Republic	Retro Music Hall
30 October 2013	Leipzig	Germany	Hellraiser
31 October 2013	Geiselwind	Germany	Music Hall
1 November 2013	Vosselaar	Belgium	Biebob
2 November 2013	Essen	Germany	Weststadthalle
3 November 2013	Rotterdam	Netherlands	Baroeg
