= Wolfsnächte Tour 2012 =

2011–12 concert tour by Powerwolf

- Tour by Powerwolf
- Location: Europe
- Associated album: Blood of the Saints
- Start date: 9 December 2011
- End date: 21 July 2012
- No. of shows: 28
- Supporting acts: Mystic Prophecy, Stormwarrior, Lonewolf

Powerwolf concert chronology
- Power of Metal Tour 2011 (2011); Wolfsnächte Tour 2012 (2012); Wolfsnächte Tour 2013 (2013)

The Wolfsnächte Tour 2012 was a European concert tour by German power metal band Powerwolf. Supporting the release of their fourth studio album Blood of the Saints, the tour ran from 9 December 2011 to 21 July 2012, taking place in Germany, Switzerland, Russia, Austria, Belgium, Poland, Croatia, Italy and Czech Republic.

== Background ==
The tour dates were announced in December 2011. Mystic Prophecy, Stormwarrior and Lonewolf served a series of opening acts for Powerwolf during the tour.

Powerwolf released the Wolfsnächte 2012 Tour EP, a split EP with Mystic Prophecy, Stormwarrior, and Lonewolf. This EP featured a previously unreleased Powerwolf track, "Living on a Nightmare". Copies of this EP were originally distributed along with the purchase of tickets to the tour but since its conclusion, copies have been available in the Powerwolf webstore.

During the tour, Powerwolf also recorded their first live album, Alive in the Night. It contained 10 tracks and was just over 45 minutes in length. It was released with the April 2012 issue of the German edition of Metal Hammer.

== Set list ==
This setlist is representative of the show on 9 April 2012 in Augsburg, Germany, at the Spectrum Club. It does not represent all dates throughout the tour.

1. "Agnus Dei" (Note: Song played from tape.)
2. "Sanctified with Dynamite"
3. "Prayer in the Dark"
4. "Catholic in the Morning... Satanist at Night"
5. "We Drink Your Blood"
6. "All We Need Is Blood"
7. "Dead Boys Don't Cry"
8. "Werewolves of Armenia"
9. Drum solo
10. "Raise Your Fist, Evangelist"
11. "Resurrection by Erection"
12. "Saturday Satan"
13. "Lupus Dei"
14. "Opening: Prelude to Purgatory" (Note: Song played from tape.)
15. "St. Satan's Day"
16. "Kiss of the Cobra King"
17. "In Blood We Trust"
18. "Wolves Against the World" (Note: Song played from tape.)

== Tour dates ==
List of concerts, showing date, city, country, and venue
Date	City	Country	Venue
9 December 2011	Geiselwind	Germany	Christmas Metal Meeting
30 December 2011	Zürich	Switzerland	Volkshaus
3 February 2012	Saint Petersburg	Russia	Orlandina
4 February 2012	Moscow	Russia	Plan B Club
19 February 2012	Saarbrücken	Germany	Garage
3 March 2012	Osnabrück	Germany	Winterfire Festival
30 March 2012	Lindau	Germany	Club Vaudeville
31 March 2012	Wörgl	Austria	Komma
1 April 2012	Ludwigsburg	Germany	Rockfabrik Ludwigsburg
5 April 2012	Hanover	Germany	Musikzentrum
7 April 2012	Zizers	Switzerland	Eventstage
8 April 2012	Mons	Belgium	PPM Festival
9 April 2012	Augsburg	Germany	Spectrum Club
13 April 2012	Langen	Germany	Stadthalle
14 April 2012	Berlin	Germany	C-Club
27 April 2012	Speyer	Germany	Halle 101
28 April 2012	Geiselwind	Germany	Musichall
29 April 2012	Hamburg	Germany	Markthalle
30 April 2012	Bochum	Germany	Matrix
31 May 2012	Mining	Austria	Metalfest Austria
1 June 2012	Jaworzno	Poland	Metalfest Poland
2 June 2012	Jaworzno	Poland	Metalfest Poland
3 June 2012	Zadar	Croatia	Metalfest Croatia
4 June 2012	Zadar	Croatia	Metalfest Croatia
5 June 2012	Milan	Italy	Metalfest Italia
6 June 2012	Milan	Italy	Metalfest Italia
7 June 2012	Pratteln	Switzerland	Metalfest Switzerland
8 June 2012	Pratteln	Switzerland	Metalfest Switzerland
9 June 2012	Plzeň	Czech Republic	Metalfest Czech Republic
10 June 2012	Plzeň	Czech Republic	Metalfest Czech Republic
19 July 2012	Schleusegrund	Germany	Queens of Metal Open Air
20 July 2012	Schleusegrund	Germany	Queens of Metal Open Air
21 July 2012	Schleusegrund	Germany	Queens of Metal Open Air
