= Best of the Blessed =

Greatest hits album by Powerwolf
- Released: 3 July 2020
- Recorded: 2013–2020
- Genres: Power metal; heavy metal; symphonic metal; speed metal
- Length: 66:42
- Label: Napalm Records
- Producers: Fredrik Nordström; Jens Bogren

Powerwolf chronology
Metallum Nostrum (2019)	Best of the Blessed (2020)	Call of the Wild (2021)

Singles from Best of the Blessed
- 1. "Kiss of the Cobra King" Released: 1 November 2019; 2. "Werewolves of Armenia" Released: 27 March 2020

Best of the Blessed is a greatest hits album by German power metal band Powerwolf. Initially set to be released on 5 June 2020, it was later released on 3 July 2020 via Napalm Records. The album is partly a collection of songs released since 2013, while also containing six re-recorded songs and one re-written song released prior to 2013.

A limited earbook and LP box edition also features a second disc named The Live Sacrament, which features live songs recorded during Wolfsnächte Tour 2018.

Before the album was released, the group released the new version of "Kiss of the Cobra King" as a single on 1 November 2019. The song received a music video as well. On 27 March 2020, they released the new version "Werewolves of Armenia" as the second single.

== Track listing ==
All tracks are written by Matthew Greywolf, Charles Greywolf, Attila Dorn, Falk Maria Schlegel, Stéfane Funèbre and Roel van Helden.

Best of the Blessed track listing
No.	Title	Length
1.	"We Drink Your Blood (New Version 2020)"	3:45
2.	"Army of the Night"	3:21
3.	"Demons Are a Girl's Best Friend"	3:38
4.	"Werewolves of Armenia (New Version 2020)"	4:15
5.	"Saturday Satan (New Version 2020)"	5:19
6.	"Amen & Attack"	3:54
7.	"Where the Wild Wolves Have Gone"	4:13
8.	"Resurrection by Erection (New Version 2020)"	4:02
9.	"Sanctified with Dynamite (New Version 2020)"	4:27
10.	"Kreuzfeuer"	3:47
11.	"Armata Strigoi"	3:59
12.	"Kiss of the Cobra King (New Version 2019)"	3:50
13.	"Killers with the Cross"	4:09
14.	"Sacred & Wild"	3:40
15.	"In Blood We Trust (New Version 2020)"	3:04
16.	"Let There Be Night"	7:19
Total length:		66:42

The Live Sacrament (Earbook bonus)
No.	Title	Length
1.	"Fire & Forgive"	6:27
2.	"Incense & Iron"	4:42
3.	"Amen & Attack"	3:57
4.	"Demons Are a Girl's Best Friend"	4:25
5.	"Killers with the Cross"	4:46
6.	"Armata Strigoi"	5:12
7.	"Blessed & Possessed"	4:46
8.	"Where the Wild Wolves Have Gone"	4:26
9.	"Resurrection by Erection"	3:58
10.	"Stossgebet"	4:50
11.	"All We Need Is Blood"	3:51
12.	"We Drink Your Blood"	3:54
13.	"Werewolves of Armenia"	5:26
14.	"Lupus Dei"	5:25
Total length:		66:13

The Live Bonus Sacrament (Earbook & LP Box bonus)
No.	Title	Length
1.	"Sanctified with Dynamite"	6:15
2.	"Army of the Night"	4:29
3.	"Coleus Sanctus"	4:01
4.	"Let There Be Night"	4:48
Total length:		19:35

== Credits and personnel ==
- Attila Dorn – vocals
- Matthew Greywolf – lead guitar
- Charles Greywolf – rhythm guitar, bass
- Falk Maria Schlegel – organ, keyboards
- Stéfane Funèbre – drums
- Roel van Helden – drums

== Charts ==
Chart performance for Best of the Blessed
Chart (2020)	Peak position
Austrian Albums (Ö3 Austria)	28
Belgian Albums (Ultratop Flanders)	40
Belgian Albums (Ultratop Wallonia)	14
French Albums (SNEP)	200
German Albums (Offizielle Top 100)	2
Hungarian Albums (MAHASZ)	27
Scottish Albums (Official Charts)	93
Swiss Albums (Schweizer Hitparade)	9
