= The Wacken Worship =

Video by Powerwolf
- Released: 2008
- Recorded: 2 August 2008
- Venue: Wacken Open Air
- Genre: Power metal; heavy metal; speed metal
- Label: Metal Blade Records; Roax Productions
- Director: Roland Matthes
- Producer: Ronald Matthes, Marcel Schleiff

Powerwolf chronology
Lupus Dei (2007)	The Wacken Worship (2008)	Bible of the Beast (2009)

The Wacken Worship is the first video album by German power metal band Powerwolf. The album contains live footage of their show at Wacken Open Air on 2 August 2008.

It was also released as a bonus DVD for the limited edition of their third studio album Bible of the Beast in 2009, and in 2014 on the box set The History of Heresy I.

It also contained a video "Impressions from the Europe in Bloodred Tour 2005".

== Track listing ==
No.	Title	Length
1.	"Intro"
2.	"We Take It from the Living"
3.	"Prayer in the Dark"
4.	"We Came to Take Your Souls"
5.	"Saturday Satan"
6.	"In Blood We Trust"
7.	"Mr. Sinister"
8.	"Mother Mary Is a Bird of Prey"
9.	"Kiss of the Cobra King"
10.	"Lupus Dei"
11.	"Impressions from the Europe in Bloodred Tour 2005"

== Personnel ==
- Attila Dorn – vocals
- Matthew Greywolf – lead guitar
- Charles Greywolf – rhythm guitar
- Stéfane Funèbre – drums, percussion
- Falk Maria Schlegel – keyboards
- Ronald Matthes – director
- Ronald Matthes – executive producer
- Marcel Schleiff – executive producer
- Rodrigo Diaz – film editor
- Marianne Baar – production leader
- Jacky Lehmann – audio recording
- Robin Stirnberg – sound engineer
- Matthias Wendt – audio recording engineer
- Marcus Dattilo – crane operator
- Ludwig Götze – camera operator
- Kaja Kargus – camera operator
- Stefan Koch – camera operator
- Krischan Kriesten – lighting director
- Jan-Paul Wass – camera operator
- Rodrigo Diaz – color correction
- Stefan Ost – live editor
- Jochen Schaaf – live editor
- James Boyle – stage manager
- Thomas Grummt – DVD authoring
- Norbert Kuntz – production leader on site
