= Powerwolf =

German power metal band

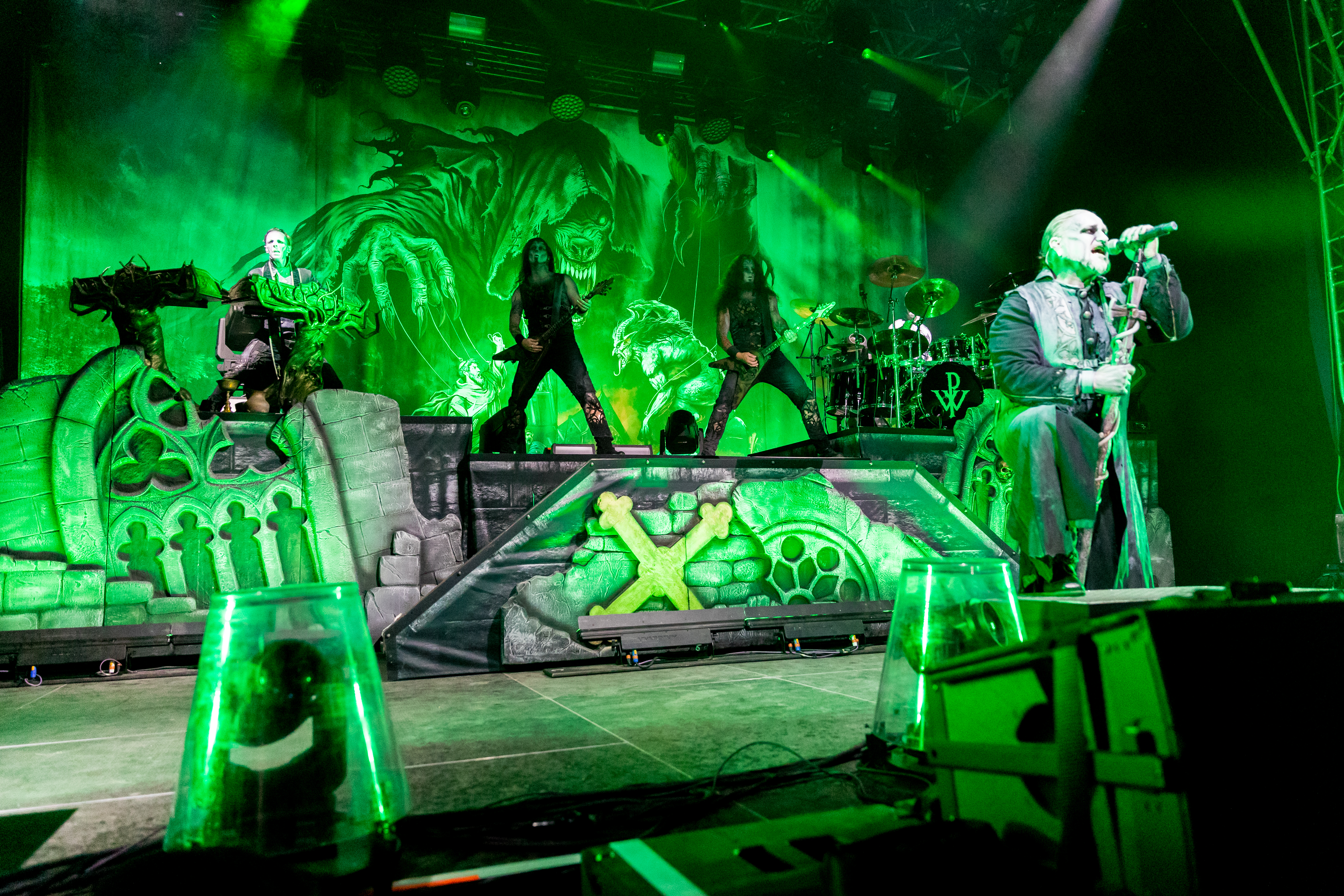
- Powerwolf performing at Zeltfestival Rhein-Neckar in 2019

Background information
- Origin: Saarbrücken, Saarland, Germany
- Genres: Power metal; heavy metal
- Years active: 2004–present
- Labels: Metal Blade; Napalm
- Members: Matthew Greywolf; Charles Greywolf; Falk Maria Schlegel; Attila Dorn; Roel van Helden
- Past members: Stéfane Funèbre; Tom Diener
- Website: powerwolf.net

Powerwolf (often stylized in all caps) is a German power metal band founded in 2004 in Saarbrücken by members of Red Aim. The band consists of vocalist Karsten Brill as "Attila Dorn", lead guitarist Benjamin Buss as "Matthew Greywolf", bassist/rhythm guitarist David Vogt as "Charles Greywolf", keyboardist Christian Jost as "Falk Maria Schlegel" and drummer Roel van Helden. The group uses religious themes and images, contrary to traditional power metal music, as well as corpse paint, gothic-tinged compositions and songs about werewolf and vampire legends.

They released their debut album, Return in Bloodred, in 2005. Their second album, Lupus Dei, was released in 2007. The band entered the official German charts for the first time in 2009 with their third album, Bible of the Beast. Shortly after its release, their first drummer Stefan Gemballa (stage name Stéfane Funèbre) left the band. He was replaced by Tom Diener, who was replaced in 2011 by Roel van Helden. In the same year, the band released their fourth album, Blood of the Saints. In 2012, Powerwolf signed with Napalm Records and released Preachers of the Night in 2013. It has debuted at No. 1 in Germany. Their sixth album, Blessed & Possessed, released in 2015, was certified gold in the Czech Republic. Their seventh album, The Sacrament of Sin, was released in 2018. Their eighth album, Call of the Wild, was released in 2021. Their ninth album, Interludium, was released in 2023. Their tenth album, Wake Up the Wicked, was released in 2024.

Powerwolf has embarked on several tours, with a majority of their tour dates taking place inside of Europe. They also change their costumes for every album. Over the years, a theme has developed which personifies the band members as werewolves, leading fans to refer to the band affectionately as "The Wolves".

== History ==
=== 2004–2009: Formation and first albums ===
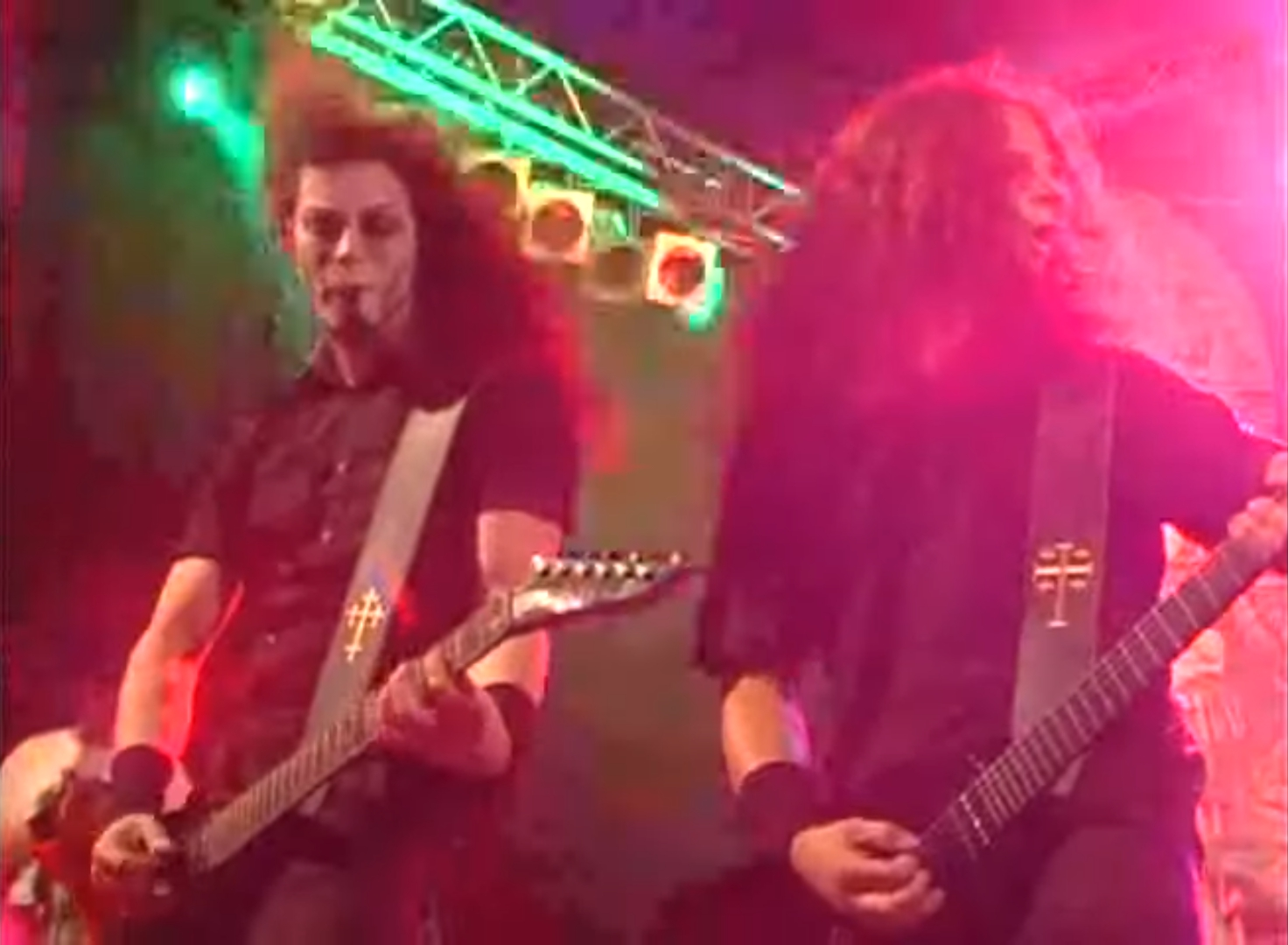
"Matthew" and "Charles Greywolf" in 2009

Powerwolf have used their logo (top) since the release of Preachers of the Night in 2013 and their typeface since the start of their discography

Powerwolf was formed in 2004 by the members of the stoner rock band Red Aim. When the band was founded, the members decided to take on pseudonyms and build up backstories around those.

Officially, the brothers Charles and Matthew Greywolf had been playing together for years when they decided to create a band, and so Powerwolf was started. Soon the brothers added German drummer Stéfane Funèbre and German keyboardist Falk Maria Schlegel to the band, but could not find a suitable singer to complete the line-up. In the meantime, the band started writing, and on holidays in Romania, Charles and Matthew met Attila Dorn in a pub and invited him to join their band. Dorn, a student of classical opera at the academy in Bucharest, moved to the band's hometown Saarbrücken, and became the frontman of Powerwolf. With Dorn's love of Romanian werewolf legends, the band created their debut album, Return in Bloodred, which used these same legends as the basis for many of the lyrics. After the album's release, Powerwolf went on their first tour titled Europe in Bloodred Tour.

In 2007, they followed up with their second album, Lupus Dei, a concept album starring a wolf as the main character and his rise from bloodlust to enlightenment. Powerwolf supported Grave Digger during their tour.

In 2008, Powerwolf released their first video album The Wacken Worship. It contained live footage of their show at Wacken Open Air 2008. In the same year, they went on a Metal is our Mission Tour together with Brainstorm and Pagan's Mind.

The single "Raise Your Fist, Evangelist" was released on 19 March 2009. Powerwolf's third album Bible of the Beast was released on 24 April 2009. The record was able to place as the band's first album in the German charts and reached number 76. They embarked on a tour supporting the album in 2010. "Raise Your Fist, Evangelist" was nominated for the Metal Hammer "Metal Anthem 2010" award.

=== 2010–2011: Drummer change and Blood of the Saints ===
On 2 March 2010 Stéfane Funèbre left the band and was replaced by Tom Diener. Powerwolf announced it on their Myspace blog. In November 2010, Powerwolf organist Falk Maria Schlegel stated about the group's new material:

We spent the last three months in the rehearsal room working out stuff for the new album. Even though it's still in the making, we can already promise the songs are 100% POWERWOLF, taking off where Bible of the Beast ended. There's furious stuff, there's epic stuff — and all of it is catchy as hell.

On 28 May 2011 the band announced on their website that Tom Diener was replaced by a new drummer Roel van Helden from the Netherlands.

The band released the single "Sanctified with Dynamite" on 24 May 2011 and the second one on 5 July 2011 titled "We Drink Your Blood", to which Powerwolf recorded their first ever music video. It was shot in an ancient monastery church. Falk Maria Schlegel commented that "Shooting the video in such a special and atmospheric place was incredible. The combination of the sacral interior of the church, including altar, confessional box and a church organ with a lot of fire, fog and metal insanity was the perfect set for a Powerwolf video."

Their fourth album, titled Blood of the Saints, was released on 29 July 2011 in Europe and 2 August in the United States.

In September 2011, Powerwolf went on a quadruple headline tour with Sabaton, Grave Digger and Skull Fist.

=== 2012–2013: Debut with Napalm Records ===
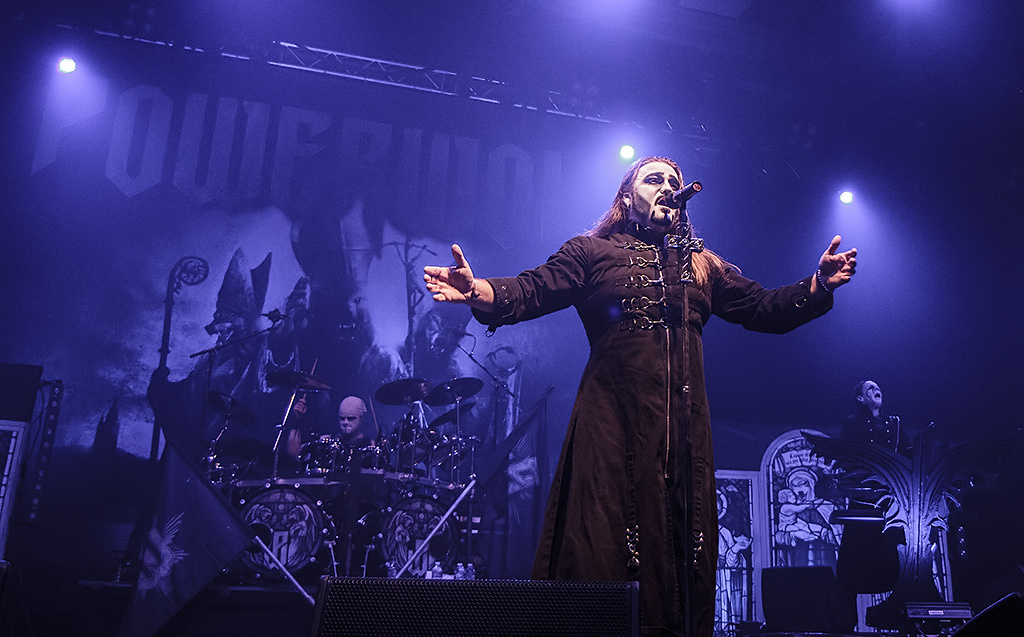
Powerwolf performing at Knock Out, December 2012

In 2012, Powerwolf released two albums. The first was the Wolfsnächte 2012 Tour EP, a split EP with Mystic Prophecy, Stormwarrior, and Lonewolf. This EP featured a previously unreleased Powerwolf track, "Living on a Nightmare". Copies of this EP were originally distributed along with the purchase of tickets to Powerwolf's Wolfsnächte Tour 2012 but since the tour's conclusion, copies have been available in the Powerwolf webstore.

The second of Powerwolf's 2012 releases was Alive in the Night, the band's first live album. It contained 10 tracks and was just over 45 minutes in length. It was released with the April 2012 issue of the German edition of Metal Hammer.

On 13 August 2012, Powerwolf signed a deal with Napalm Records. Powerwolf released their EP The Rockhard Sacrament on 22 June 2013. The band also released their single "Amen & Attack" on 28 June 2013.

Preachers of the Night was released on 18 July 2013. The album entered the official German album charts at position 1.

=== 2014–2016: Blessed & Possessed ===
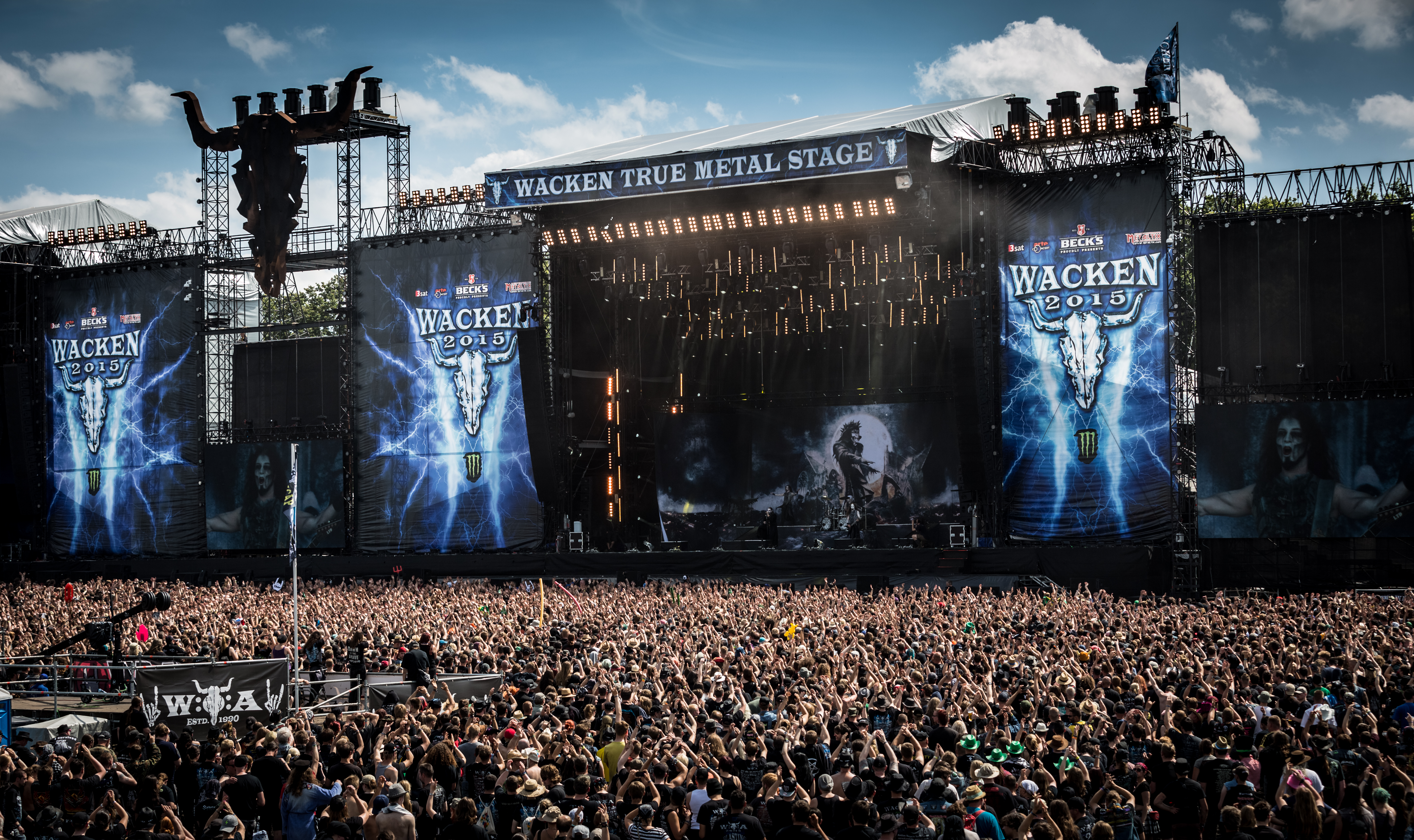
Powerwolf performing at Wacken Open Air 2015

In 2014, Powerwolf released The History of Heresy I and The History of Heresy II, the second of which included several orchestral versions of Powerwolf songs.

Powerwolf began working on their sixth album in June 2014. They announced their new album on their Facebook page on 5 December 2014. On 8 May 2015, the band released their single "Army of the Night" and "Armata Strigoi" on 5 June 2015. Their new album Blessed & Possessed, which was released on 17 July 2015. They embarked on a tour supporting the album into 2016.

Boxset and earbook editions of the album featured a bonus CD Metallum Nostrum, which contains 10 songs of different artists that Powerwolf's band members selected to cover, such as Judas Priest, Running Wild, Savatage, Chroming Rose, Gary Moore, Ozzy Osbourne, Amon Amarth, Iron Maiden and Black Sabbath.

Powerwolf released their second video album The Metal Mass – Live on 27 July 2016 in Japan and 29 July 2016 in Europe. It contained live footage of three shows: Masters of Rock 2015, Summer Breeze 2015, Wolfsnächte Tour 2015, music videos to "Amen & Attack", "Army of the Night", "We Drink Your Blood" and "Sanctified with Dynamite", a festival documentation "A Day At Summer Breeze" and a tour documentation movie "Kreuzweg – Of Wolves And Men".

=== 2017–2019: The Sacrament of Sin ===
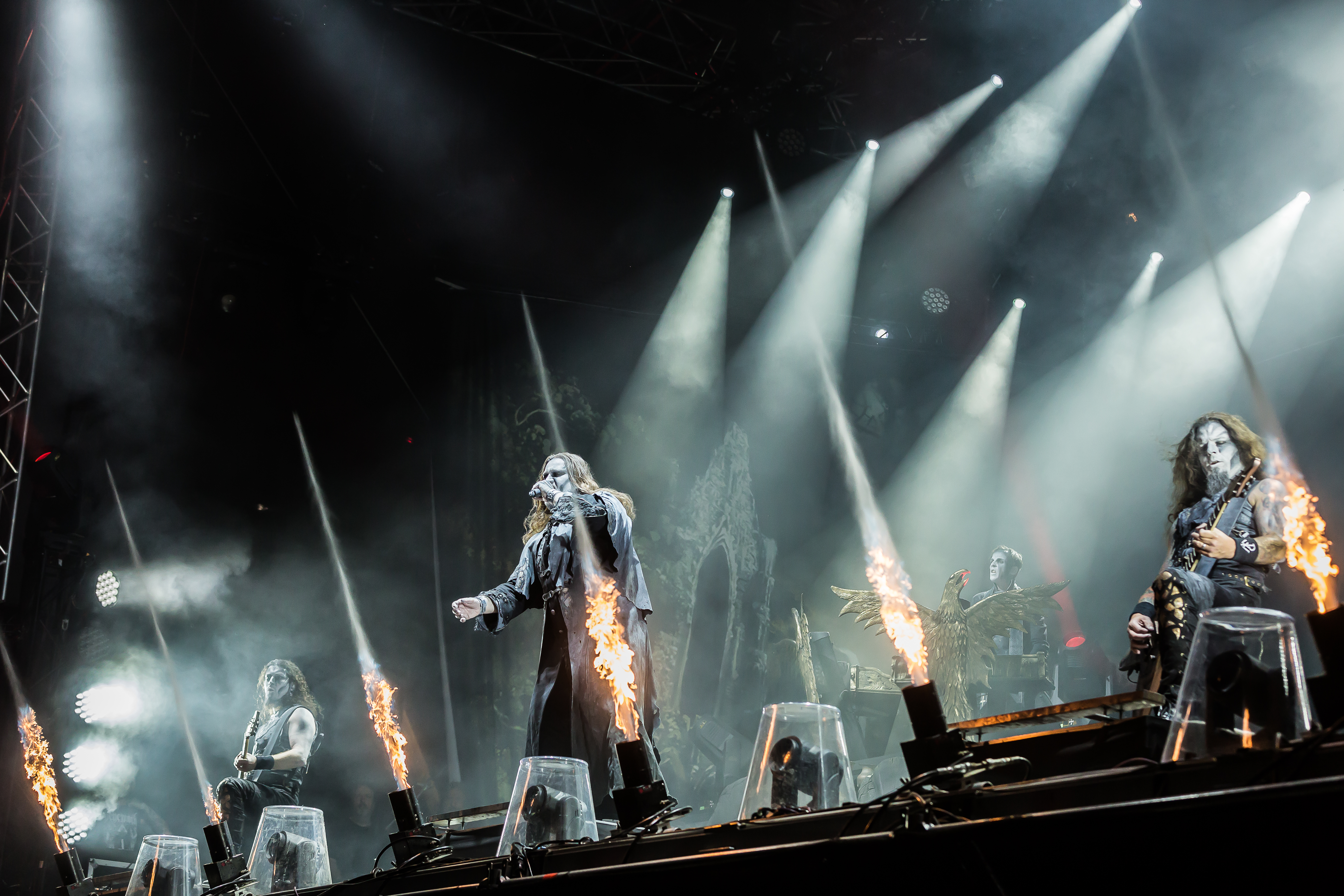
Powerwolf performing at Summer Breeze Open Air 2018

On 10 October 2017, Powerwolf announced on Facebook that they had completed writing for their seventh full-length album, promising its release to occur sometime in 2018. In January 2018, the band entered the studio to begin recording the album, due later in the year. The title of the album was later announced as The Sacrament of Sin, which was released on 20 July 2018. It was Jens Bogren's first production work for Powerwolf. The album was rated positively by the critics, highlighting mainly the new elements that Powerwolf put in the music. The album also flourished commercially, ranked first in the German charts, and also ranked in several other countries. On 14 September 2018, the album won a German Metal Hammer "Best album of the year" award.

A limited edition mediabook version of The Sacrament of Sin featured a second disc named Communio Lupatum, which featured Powerwolf songs covered by other artists selected by the band members, such as Epica, Saltatio Mortis, Caliban, Battle Beast, Heaven Shall Burn, Kadavar, Kissin' Dynamite, Mille Petrozza, Marc Görtz, Amaranthe and Eluveitie.

In support of the album, the band performed in Europe during 2018 and 2019.

On 11 January 2019, Powerwolf re-released their cover album Metallum Nostrum.

On 1 November 2019, the band released their single of their re-written and re-recorded version of "Kiss of the Cobra King".

=== 2020–present: Call of the Wild, Interludium, Wake Up the Wicked and next album ===
In 2020, Powerwolf went on their first Latin America tour along with Amon Amarth. They had to cancel the last three concerts due to the COVID-19 pandemic.

On 16 January 2020, Powerwolf announced their greatest hits album titled Best of the Blessed. Initially set to be released on 5 June 2020, it was later scheduled to be released on 3 July 2020.

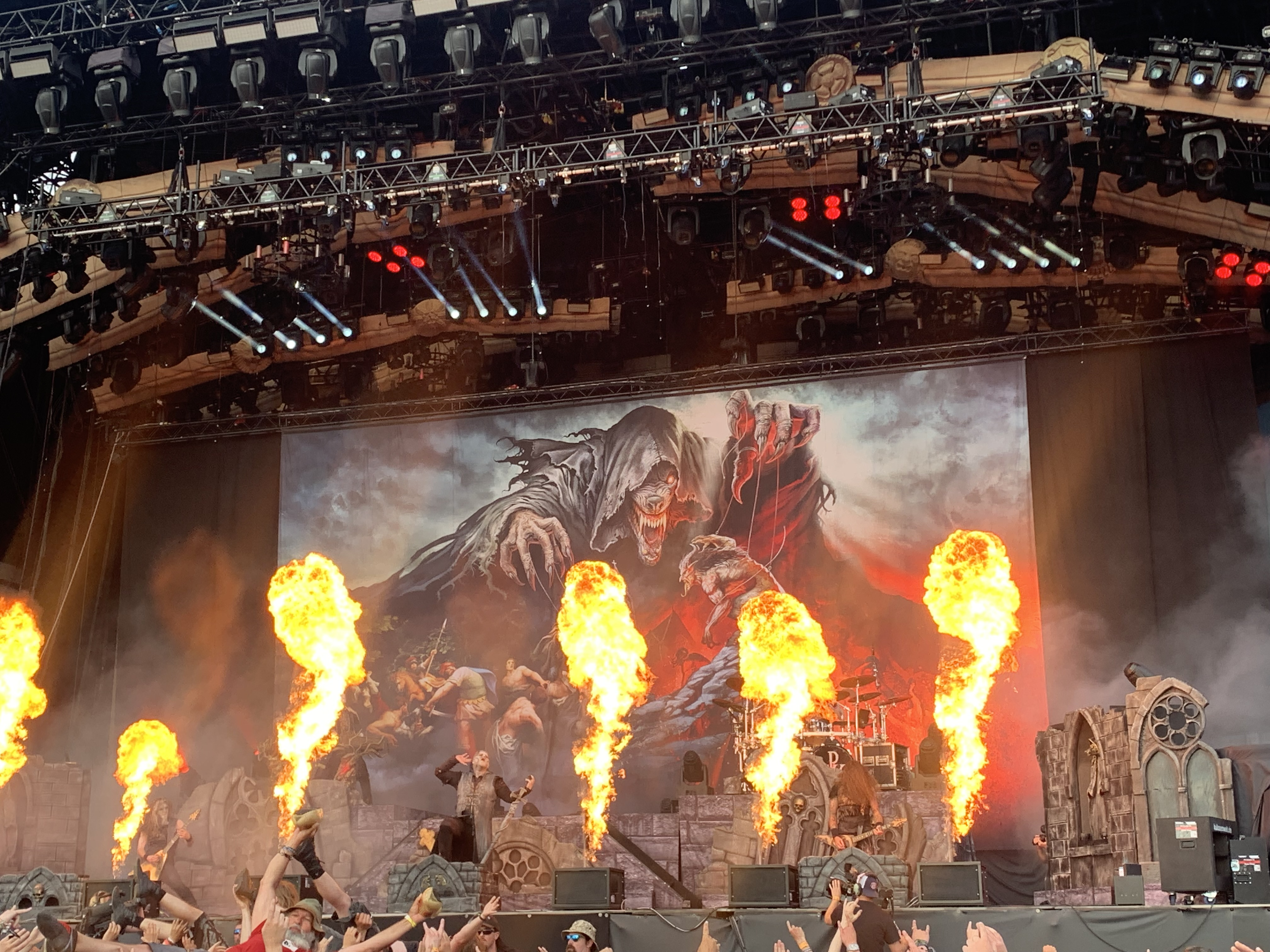
Powerwolf performs at Graspop Metal Meeting in 2022.

On 28 April 2020, Powerwolf announced work on a new studio album, to be released in 2021.

On 19 January 2021, Powerwolf announced their new album would be named Call of the Wild. Later on 20 May 2021, the first song of the album, "Beast of Gévaudan", was released. On 9 June 2021, a re-recorded version of "Demons Are a Girl's Best Friend" featuring Alissa White-Gluz on vocals (from Missa Cantorem, the bonus cover album included with various special formats of Call of the Wild) was released. On 23 June, the band released another new song of their new album called "Dancing with the Dead".

On 16 July 2021, Call of the Wild, the band's eighth album, was released.

On 4 October 2022, the band announced that they were set to perform their first North American shows in New York City and Montreal in February 2023. On 28 November, Powerwolf announced that their ninth studio album, Interludium, would be released on 7 April 2023. On 4 April 2024, Powerwolf announced that their tenth studio album, Wake Up the Wicked, was released on 26 July 2024. The band is expected to release their next studio album in 2027.

== Artistry ==
=== Musical style and lyrics ===
"Fire & Forgive"
Sample of "Fire & Forgive" from The Sacrament of Sin (2018).

Powerwolf's sound has primarily been described as power metal and traditional heavy metal.

Powerwolf's musical style is different from other power metal bands. In addition to the classic metal instruments, organ sounds are used. For the studio albums, a church choir was recorded. The band states that their main influences are Black Sabbath, Mercyful Fate, Forbidden and Iron Maiden.

The dominant language of the lyrics is English, but they also use Latin ("Werewolves of Armenia", "Lupus Dei", "Kreuzfeuer", "Stossgebet", "Sanctus Dominus"), and rarely German ("Moscow After Dark", "We Take the Church by Storm", "Werewolves of Armenia", "Kreuzfeuer", "Amen & Attack", "Stossgebet", "Glaubenskraft"). The lyrics of the band are characterized by the treatment of Christianity and ancient Romanian legends. Powerwolf, however, do not consider themselves a religious band, but rather call themselves spiritual. When asked if he was a Christian or a Satanist, Matthew Greywolf answered: "I am a metalist, a metal fan. Metal is my religion. Look at all these people, what unites them? I can tell you, it's the fucking metal." In one of the interviews, Matthew is quoted saying:

Some people are confused because we never make a point of saying the silly words of which side we are on. A lot of people ask us, "Are you Satanists? Are you Christians?" And we never say anything about that, and we never will, because in what we do in Powerwolf, it's not important what we as individuals believe or stand for. We sometimes describe religious history, we sometimes write about Satanism, Catholicism, or whatever, but we never judge anything. I think on one side, this is confusing people, but on the other side, a lot of people do understand that we only describe or write lyrics about something, not to deliver a message.

=== Live performances ===
Audience engagement, and pyrotechnics are important parts of Powerwolf's stage show. The vocalist Attila Dorn often speaks directly to the audience and engages them in various activities, such as singing or shouting, before announcing the next song. The band calls their concerts a "heavy metal mass". Their stage setup was designed by Matthew Greywolf.

== Band members ==
Powerwolf band members
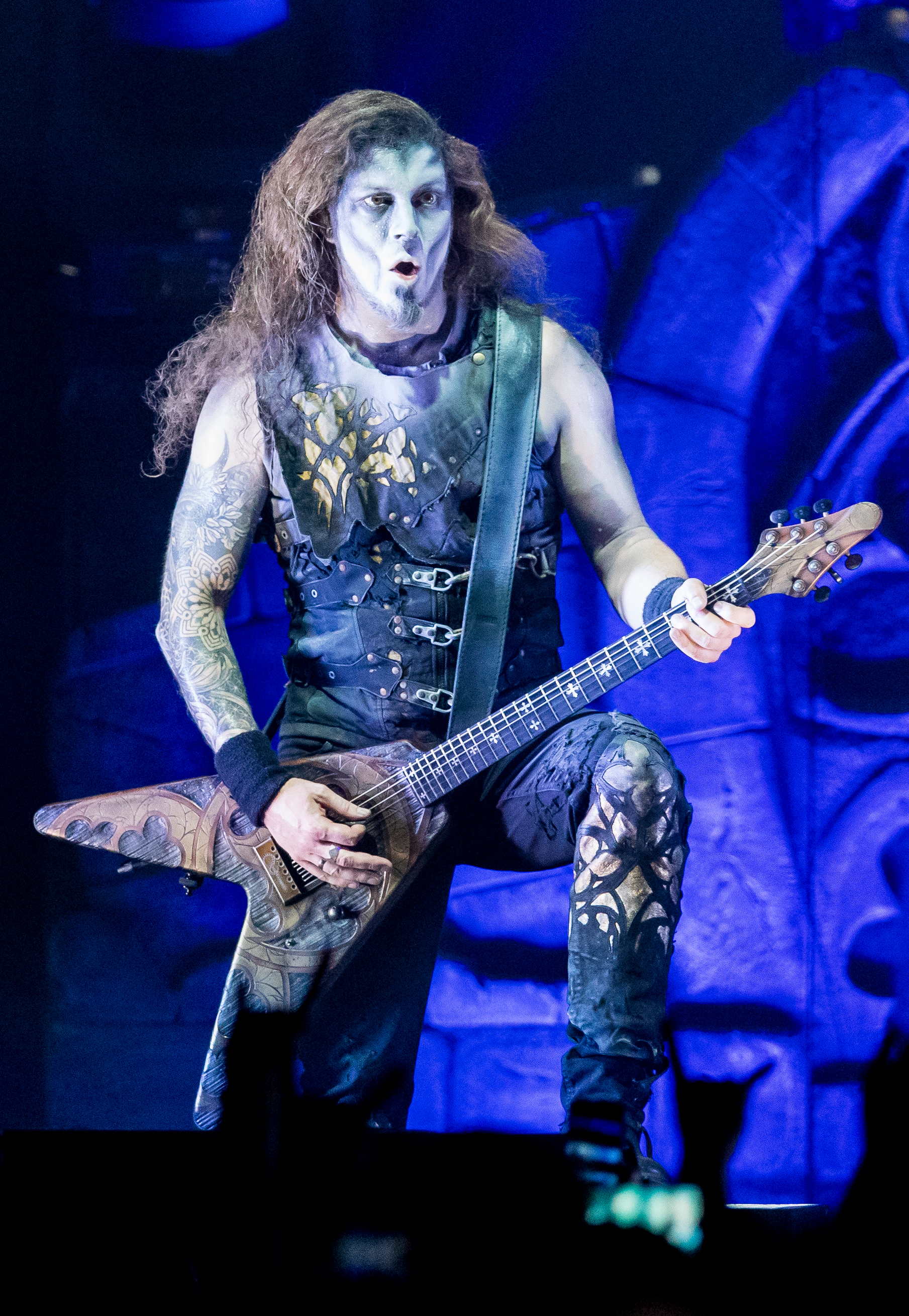
Matthew Greywolf

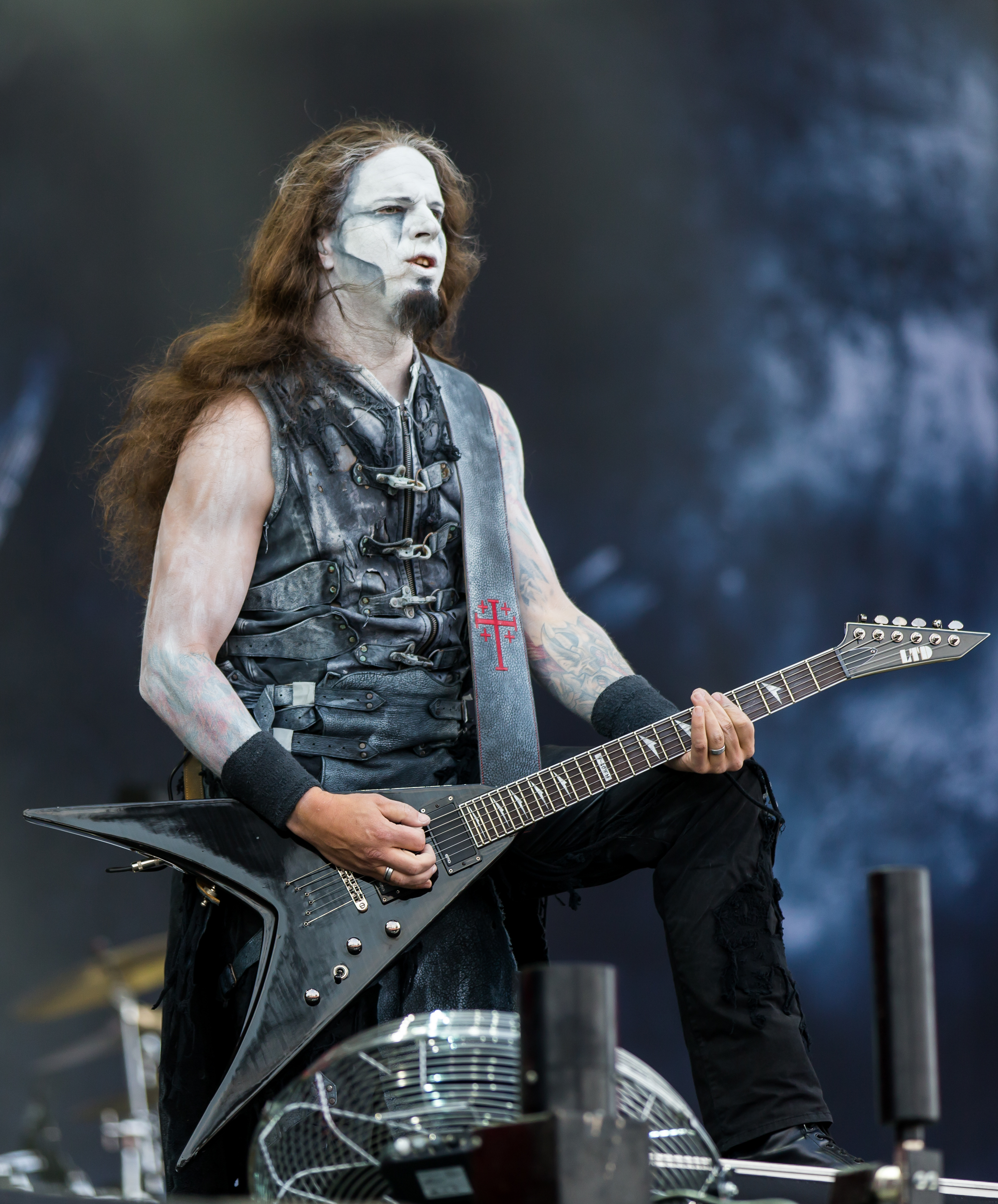
Charles Greywolf

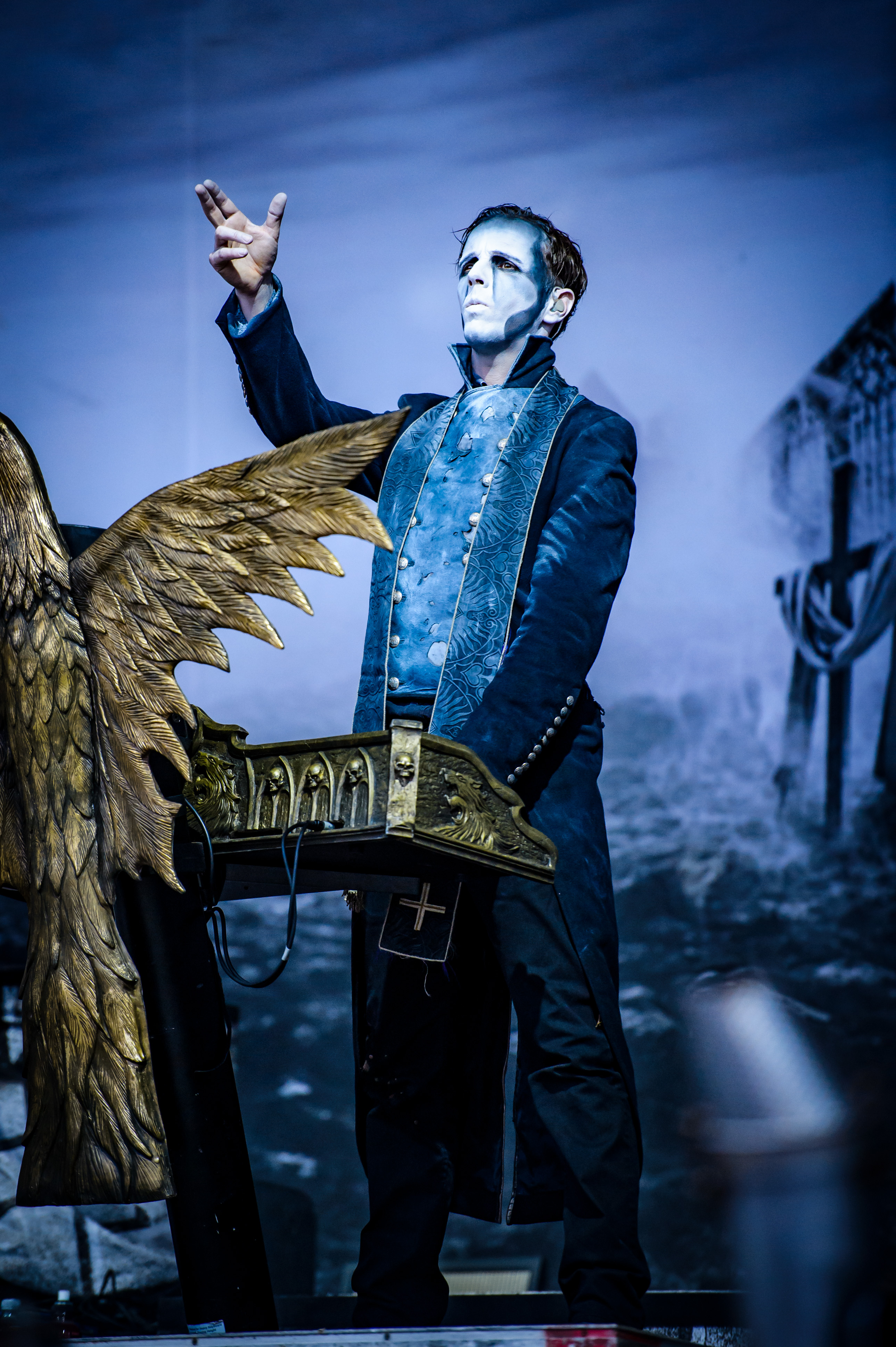
Falk Maria Schlegel

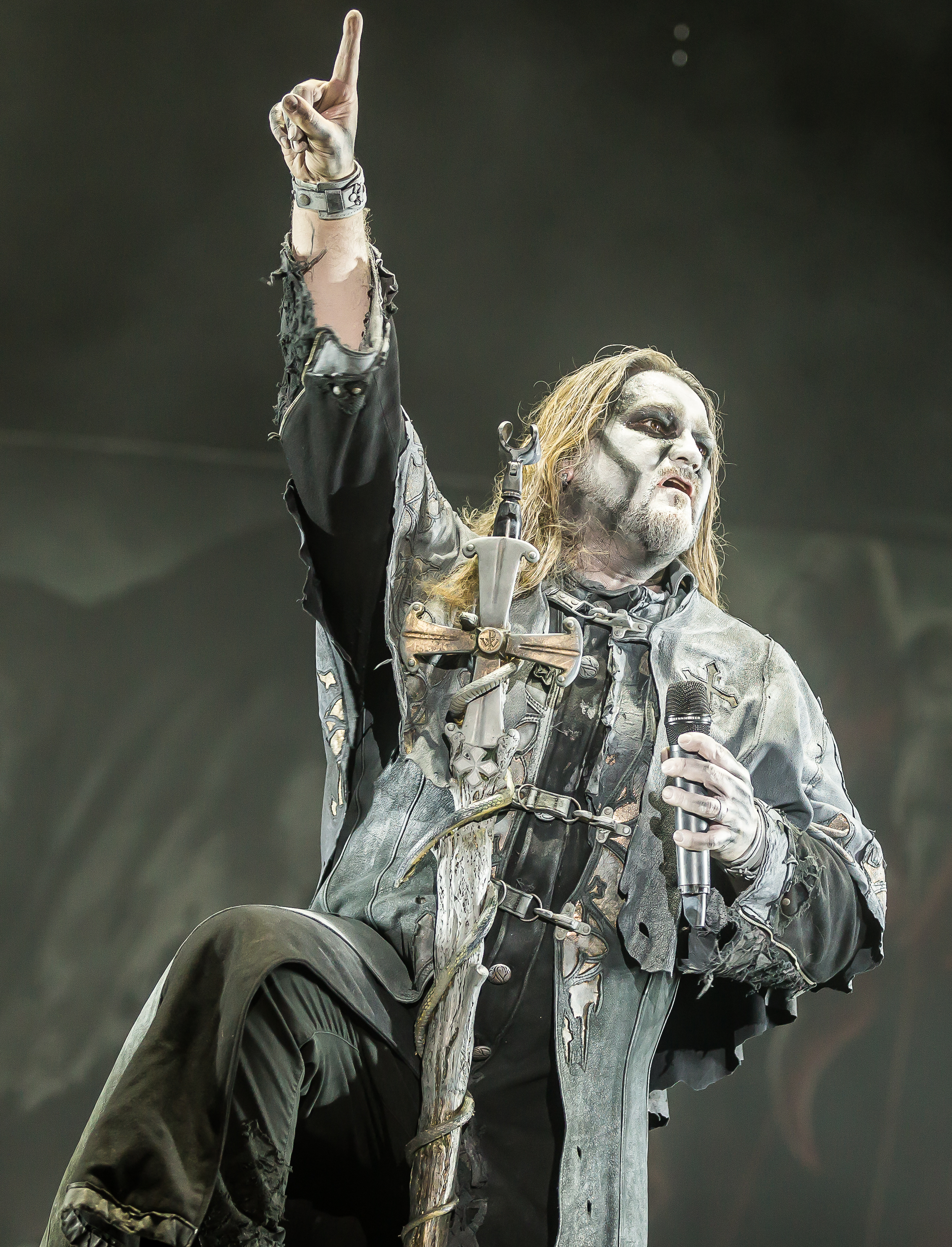
Attila Dorn

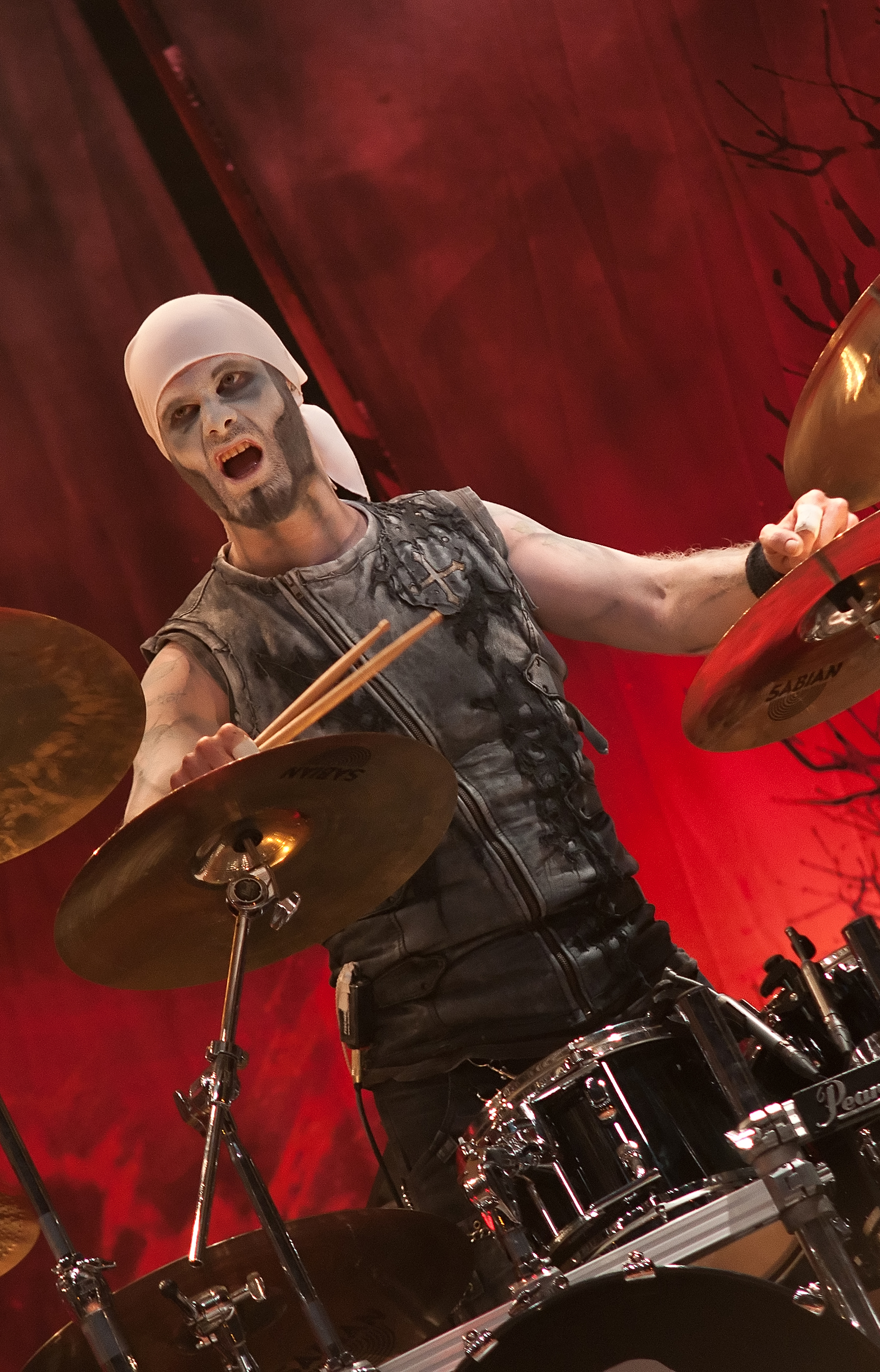
Roel van Helden

=== Current ===
- Benjamin "Matthew Greywolf" Buss – lead guitar (2004–present)
- David "Charles Greywolf" Vogt – bass, rhythm guitar (2004–present)
- Christian "Falk Maria Schlegel" Jost – keyboards (2004–present)
- Karsten "Attila Dorn" Brill – vocals (2004–present)
- Roel van Helden – drums (2011–present)

=== Live ===
- Dom R. Crey - lead guitar (2026)
- Markus Pohl – lead guitar (2016–2025)
- Fabian Schwarz – lead guitar (2012)

=== Former ===
- Stefan "Stéfane Funèbre" Gemballa – drums (2004–2010)
- Tom Diener – drums (2010–2011)

== Discography ==
- Return in Bloodred (2005)
- Lupus Dei (2007)
- Bible of the Beast (2009)
- Blood of the Saints (2011)
- Preachers of the Night (2013)
- Blessed & Possessed (2015)
- The Sacrament of Sin (2018)
- Call of the Wild (2021)
- Interludium (2023)
- Wake Up the Wicked (2024)

== Tours ==
- 2005 - Europe in Bloodred
- 2007 - Liberty Or Death (supporting Grave Digger)
- 2008 - Metal is Our Mission (with Brainstorm and Pagan's Mind)
- 2010 - Bible of the Beast
- 2011 - Power of Metal (with Sabaton, Grave Digger, and Skull Fist)
- 2012 - Wolfsnächte (with Mystic Prophecy, Stormwarrior, and Lonewolf)
- 2013 - Wolfsnächte (with Majesty, Battle Beast, Ashes of Ares, and Wisdom)
- 2015 - Wolfsnächte (with Orden Ogan, Xandria, and Civil War)
- 2016 - Blessed & Possessed (with Battle Beast and Serenity)
- 2018 - Wolfsnächte (with Amaranthe and Kissin' Dynamite)
- 2019 - The Sacrament of Sin (with Gloryhammer)
- 2020 - Berserker Latin America (supporting Amon Amarth)
- 2022 - Wolfsnächte (with DragonForce and Warkings)
- 2023 - North America
- 2024 - North America (with Unleash the Archers)
- 2024 - Wolfsnächte (with Hammerfall & Wind Rose)
- 2025 - Latin American Crusade
- 2025 - Summer of the Wicked (some dates with Amaranthe & Dragonforce)
- 2025 - North America (with Dragonforce)
- 2026 - Wake Up The Wicked (with Hammerfall & Wind Rose)
- 2026 - Summer of the Wicked
- 2027 - Moral & Madness (with Apocalyptica & Majestica)

== Awards and nominations ==
| Year | Nominee / work | Award | Result |
|---|---|---|---|
| 2010 | "Raise Your Fist, Evangelist" | Metal Hammer — Metal Anthem 2010 | Nominated |
| 2011 | Powerwolf | Metal Hammer — Newcomer of the year | Won |
| 2011 | Blood of the Saints | Metal Hammer — Power metal album of the year | Won |
| 2013 | Powerwolf | Metal Hammer — Best German band | Nominated |
| 2013 | Powerwolf | Metal Hammer — Best Live Band | Nominated |
| 2014 | Powerwolf | Metal Hammer — Best German band | Nominated |
| 2014 | Powerwolf | Metal Hammer — Best Live Band | Nominated |
| 2015 | Powerwolf | Metal Hammer — Best German band | Won |
| 2016 | Powerwolf | Metal Hammer — Best Live Band | Nominated |
| 2017 | Powerwolf | Metal Hammer — Best Live Band | Nominated |
| 2018 | The Sacrament of Sin | Metal Hammer — Best album of the year | Won |
