= Metallum Nostrum =

Studio album of cover songs by Powerwolf
- Released: 11 January 2019; 17 July 2015
- Recorded: January–March 2015
- Studio: Studio Fredman, Gothenburg, Sweden
- Genre: Power metal; heavy metal; speed metal
- Length: 52:01
- Label: Napalm Records
- Producer: Fredrik Nordström

Powerwolf chronology
| The Sacrament of Sin (2018) | Metallum Nostrum (2019) | Best of the Blessed (2020) |

Limited edition cover

Metallum Nostrum is a cover album by German power metal band Powerwolf, originally released on 17 July 2015 as a bonus disc to Blessed & Possessed. It was re-released separately on 11 January 2019.

== Track listing ==
| No. | Title | Length |
|---|---|---|
| 1. | "Touch of Evil" (Judas Priest cover) | 5:40 |
| 2. | "Conquistadores" (Running Wild cover) | 4:45 |
| 3. | "Edge of Thorns" (Savatage cover) | 6:00 |
| 4. | "Power and Glory" (Chroming Rose cover) | 4:54 |
| 5. | "Out in the Fields" (Gary Moore cover) | 4:16 |
| 6. | "Shot in the Dark" (Ozzy Osbourne cover) | 4:11 |
| 7. | "Gods of War Arise" (Amon Amarth cover) | 5:53 |
| 8. | "The Evil That Men Do" (Iron Maiden cover) | 4:31 |
| 9. | "Headless Cross" (Black Sabbath cover) | 6:09 |
| 10. | "Night Crawler" (Judas Priest cover) | 5:42 |

== Personnel ==
=== Musicians ===
- Attila Dorn – vocals
- Matthew Greywolf – guitars
- Charles Greywolf – guitars, bass
- Roel van Helden – drums, percussion
- Falk Maria Schlegel – organ, keyboards

=== Additional personnel ===
- Jens Bogren – mastering
- Sam Braun – engineer
- David Buballa – engineer
- Charles Greywolf – engineer
- Matthew Greywolf – artwork, layout
- Kristian "Kohle" Kohlmannslehner – engineer
- Manuela Meyer – photography
- Fredrik Nordström – mixing
- Henrik Udd – mixing

== Charts ==
| Chart (2019) | Peak position |
|---|---|
| German Albums (Offizielle Top 100) | 67 |
| Belgian Albums (Ultratop Wallonia) | 165 |
