= Kiss of the Cobra King =

Single by Powerwolf

from the album Best of the Blessed
- Released: 1 November 2019
- Recorded: 2019
- Studio: Fascination Street Studios (Gothenburg, Sweden)
- Genre: Power metal; heavy metal
- Label: Napalm Records
- Songwriters: Attila Dorn; Charles Greywolf; Matthew Greywolf; Falk Maria Schlegel; Roel van Helden
- Producer: Jens Bogren

Powerwolf singles chronology
"Fire & Forgive" (2018)	"Kiss of the Cobra King" (2019)

Music video
- "Kiss of the Cobra King" on YouTube

"Kiss of the Cobra King" is a song by German power metal band Powerwolf. It was originally released on the album Return in Bloodred.

The song earned the Gold and Platinum Record award in Czech Republic.

== Background and release ==
The first version of "Kiss of the Cobra King" was released on Powerwolf's first studio album titled Return in Bloodred on 4 April 2005.

In 2018, the song was covered by the metalcore band Caliban. It was available on the Deluxe Edition of Powerwolf's album The Sacrament of Sin.

A re-written version of the song was released as a single on 1 November 2019.

== Subject ==
The first version of the song tells a story about a wolf, which fights against a snake. The story is about the war between Romania and the Ottoman Empire under Vlad III Dracula. According to older interviews, this is an old Romanian legend; the biography of The History of Heresy I, on the other hand, claims that the idea arose during a rehearsal session when Attila Dorn ordered a pop-up pop group to be quiet, otherwise they would be "bitten by the Cobra King."

The 2019 version tells about Eve, the first woman according to the origin story of the Abrahamic religions, who's being tempted by the serpent of Eden to eat of the Tree of the knowledge of good and evil.

== Music video ==
The music video for the song was directed by Matteo Vdiva Fabbiani and Chiara Cerami. It was released on YouTube on 1 November 2019. It follows Eve as she's being tempted to eat an apple by Matthew Greywolf, Attila Dorn, Roel van Helden, Falk Maria Schlegel and Charles Greywolf.

Eve is played by Jezz von Sperling. The video also features Alessandro Adriano Dos Santos, Ari Denaro, Beatrice Baumann, Cristina Sech, Eva Hel, Furfur, Josephine Paulenz, Lily Kumpe, Lisa Vandalism, Lyna R. Lynanuye, Mary De Weirdo, Natalie Petek, Seilor Cernunnos, Setty Mois, Thenia AF. and Zora van der Blast. It was recorded in the Insomnia nightclub in Berlin.

== Track listing ==
No.	Title	Length
1.	"Kiss of the Cobra King (New Version 2019)"	3:50
2.	"Army of the Night (Live)"	3:46

== Credits and personnel ==
- Attila Dorn – vocals
- Matthew Greywolf – lead guitar
- Charles Greywolf – rhythm guitar, bass
- Falk Maria Schlegel – organ, keyboards
- Roel van Helden – drums
