= Wake Up the Wicked =

Studio album by Powerwolf
- Released: 26 July 2024
- Studios: Greywolf Mansion Mandelbachtal; Sandlane; Eglise St. Barbe
- Genres: Power metal; heavy metal
- Length: 37:01
- Languages: English; Latin
- Label: Napalm
- Producer: Joost van den Broek

Powerwolf studio album chronology
Interludium (2023)	Wake Up the Wicked (2024)

Singles from Wake Up the Wicked
- 1. "1589" Released: 17 May 2024; 2. "Sinners of the Seven Seas" Released: 21 June 2024

Wake Up the Wicked is the tenth studio album by German power metal band Powerwolf. It was released on 26 July 2024 via Napalm Records.

== Critical reception ==
Blabbermouth.net described the work as "an album full of instantly memorable heavy metal anthems, all ornately dressed in the quasi-religious trappings and orchestral extravagance that have become such important trademarks".

Alec Chillingworth of Louder Sound states that "swimming in the Sabaton/Manowar moat rather than their Maiden/Priest paddle-pool of yore, Bless 'Em With The Blade rips Wake Up The Wicked open by reducing Deicide's career to one line: 'Tear up the Bible'" and "It's bubonically catchy heavy metal built for outdoor stages, choirs squeezing through honking organs, tearaway leads and frontman Attila Dorn's überhensch operatics".

== Track listing ==
All tracks are written by Matthew Greywolf.

No.	Title	Length
1.	"Bless 'Em with the Blade"	2:47
2.	"Sinners of the Seven Seas"	3:00
3.	"Kyrie Klitorem"	3:03
4.	"Heretic Hunters"	3:27
5.	"1589"	4:04
6.	"Viva Vulgata"	3:08
7.	"Wake Up the Wicked"	3:39
8.	"Joan of Arc"	3:20
9.	"Thunderpriest"	3:21
10.	"We Don't Wanna Be No Saints"	3:15
11.	"Vargamor"	3:57
Total length:		37:01

== Personnel ==
Powerwolf

- Attila Dorn – vocals
- Charles Greywolf – bass, guitar
- Matthew Greywolf – guitar, vocal recording, layout
- Falk Maria Schlegel – keyboards
- Roel van Helden – drums

Additional contributors

- Rodney Blaze – male backing vocals
- John "Jaycee" Cuijpers – male backing vocals
- Zsofia Dankova – artwork, illustrations
- Jens De Vos – additional booklet photography
- Jos Driessen – engineering, choir engineering
- Jasper Erkens – shout choir
- Nick Hurkmans – children's choir conductor
- Coen Janssen – shout choir
- Ted Jensen – mastering
- Jan Willem Ketelaers – male backing vocals
- Pa'dam Chamber Choir (Note: The Pa'dam Chamber Choir consists of director Maria Van Nieukerken; altos Alfrun Schmid and Annette Vermeulen; basses Martijn De Graaf Bierbrauwer and Samuel Wong; sopranos Lilian Tong and Merel van Geest; and tenors Bas Volkers and Guido Groenland.) – choir
- Peter Sallai – additional booklet illustrations
- Ingo Spörl – layout
- Joost van den Broek – production, mixing, choir recording, choir arrangement, choir scoring, shout choir, additional programming, orchestration
- Johan van Stratum – shout choir
- VD Pictures – photography
- Volgspot Class 2 – children's choir

== Charts ==
Chart performance for Wake Up the Wicked
Chart (2024)	Peak position
Austrian Albums (Ö3 Austria)	1
Belgian Albums (Ultratop Flanders)	26
Belgian Albums (Ultratop Wallonia)	75
Dutch Albums (Album Top 100)	56
French Rock & Metal Albums (SNEP)	29
German Albums (Offizielle Top 100)	1
Scottish Albums (Official Charts)	28
Swiss Albums (Schweizer Hitparade)	4
UK Album Downloads (Official Charts)	14
UK Independent Albums (Official Charts)	5
UK Rock & Metal Albums (Official Charts)	4
