= Interludium =

Studio album by Powerwolf
- Released: 7 April 2023
- Genres: Power metal; heavy metal
- Length: 36:38
- Languages: English; Latin; German; French
- Label: Napalm
- Producer: Joost van den Broek

Powerwolf studio album chronology
Call of the Wild (2021)	Interludium (2023)	Wake Up the Wicked (2024)

Singles from Interludium
- 1. "Bête du Gévaudan" Released: 2 July 2021; 2. "Sainted by the Storm" Released: 25 March 2022; 3. "My Will Be Done" Released: 11 October 2022; 4. "No Prayer at Midnight" Released: 28 February 2023

Interludium is the ninth studio album by German power metal band Powerwolf. The album was released on 7 April 2023 through Napalm Records and was produced by Joost van den Broek.

== Critical reception ==
Professional ratings
Review scores
Source	Rating
Blabbermouth.net	7/10
Metal Injection	7.5/10

David E. Gehlke from Blabbermouth.net gave the album 7 out of 10 and said: "Interludium is a quality, worthy addition to Powerwolf's expanding discography, but compilation or not, it shows that power metal bands don't take risks anymore. And given Powerwolf's continued rise through the international metal ranks, they'd be fools to try something different anyway." Metal Injection rated the album 7.5 out of 10 and stated, "Filled with the usual blend of infectious hooks and big werewolf energy that epitomise Powerwolf, it's almost impossible to listen along to Interludium without a big smile on your face. It takes full ownership of its status and delivers some meaty chunks of Powerwolf good stuff that will thrill those who know exactly what they're getting into here. This is undoubtedly a release for the fans, but the fans are going to absolutely love this."

== Track listing ==
All tracks are written by Powerwolf.

Interludium track listing
No.	Title	Length
1.	"Wolves of War"	3:58
2.	"Sainted by the Storm"	3:44
3.	"No Prayer at Midnight"	3:41
4.	"My Will Be Done"	3:42
5.	"Altars on Fire"	3:48
6.	"Wolfborn"	3:14
7.	"Stronger Than the Sacrament"	3:35
8.	"Living on a Nightmare"	3:52
9.	"Midnight Madonna"	3:33
10.	"Bête du Gévaudan"	3:31
Total length:		36:38

Notes

- Track 7 had previously been released on the EP Wolfsnächte 2015.
- Track 8 had previously been released on the EP Wolfsnächte 2012.
- Track 9 had previously been released on the limited earbook edition of the album The Sacrament of Sin in 2018.
- Track 10 had previously been released in English on the album Call of the Wild in 2021.

Disc 2
No.	Title	Length
1.	"Werewolves of Armenia" (featuring Wind Rose)	6:17
2.	"Reverent of Rats" (featuring Mystic Prophecy)	2:56
3.	"Dancing with the Dead" (featuring Annisokay)	3:47
4.	"Call of the Wild" (featuring Rage)	3:34
5.	"Venom of Venus" (featuring Ad Infinitum)	3:18
6.	"Stossgebet" (featuring Eisbrecher)	3:54
7.	"Fire & Forgive" (featuring Electric Callboy)	4:08
8.	"Armata Strigoi" (featuring Warkings)	4:15
9.	"We Are the Wild" (featuring Lord of the Lost)	3:35
10.	"Night of the Werewolves" (featuring Unleash the Archers)	4:18
Total length:		40:02

Notes

- Track 6 had previously been released on Eisbrecher's album Schicksalsmelodien in 2020.
- Track 8 had previously been released on Warkings' album Morgana in 2022.

Disc 3
No.	Title	Length
1.	"Wolves of War" (orchestral version)	3:58
2.	"Sainted by the Storm" (orchestral version)	3:46
3.	"No Prayer at Midnight" (orchestral version)	3:40
4.	"My Will Be Done" (orchestral version)	3:42
5.	"Altars on Fire" (orchestral version)	3:47
6.	"Wolfborn" (orchestral version)	3:12
7.	"Midnight Madonna" (orchestral version)	3:28
8.	"Bête du Gévaudan" (orchestral version)	3:33
Total length:		29:06

== Personnel ==
Powerwolf

- Attila Dorn – vocals
- Matthew Greywolf – lead and rhythm guitar, layout
- Charles Greywolf – bass, rhythm guitar
- Roel van Helden – drums, percussion
- Falk Maria Schlegel – organ, keyboards

Additional musicians

- Pa'Dam Chamber Choir, Coen Janssen, Jasper Erkens and Johan van Stratum – choir
- Jan Willem Ketelaers, John "Jaycee" Cuijpers and Rodney Blaze – backing vocals

Additional personnel

- Joost van den Broek – production, recording, orchestration, programming, arranging, score, choir
- Jos Driessen – engineering
- Jens Bogren and Tony Lindgren – mastering
- Zsofia Dankova – artwork, illustration
- Peter Sallai – illustration
- Ingo Spörl – layout
- Christian Ripkens and Claudia Steinle – photography

== Charts ==
Chart performance for Interludium
Chart (2023)	Peak position
Austrian Albums (Ö3 Austria)	6
Belgian Albums (Ultratop Flanders)	48
Belgian Albums (Ultratop Wallonia)	138
Canadian Albums (Music Canada)	19
German Albums (Offizielle Top 100)	3
Polish Albums (ZPAV)	92
Swiss Albums (Schweizer Hitparade)	5
