= Ashes of Ares =

American power metal band

- Ashes of Ares in 2013

Background information
- Origin: United States
- Genres: Power metal
- Years active: 2012–present
- Labels: Nuclear Blast, ROAR! Rock of Angels Records
- Spinoff of: Iced Earth; Nevermore
- Members: Matt Barlow (vocals); Freddie Vidales (guitar)
- Past members: Van Williams (drums)

Ashes of Ares is an American power metal band featuring ex-Iced Earth members Matt Barlow on vocals and Freddie Vidales on guitar. It previously included drummer Van Williams (formerly of the band Nevermore).

== History ==
In June 2012, Barlow announced on his Facebook page the creation of a new band with former Iced Earth bassist Freddie Vidales and Nevermore drummer Van Williams. Later that year the band signed with Nuclear Blast Records and entered Morrisound studio and recorded their debut self-titled album. The album was released on September 6, 2013.
The band went on tour around Europe with Powerwolf and Battle Beast in September/October 2013.

On February 13, 2017, the band announced drummer Williams had left the band he co-founded. The decision was described as "both mutual and amicable." Williams moved on to play with the band Ghost Ship Octavius. In October 2018 the band has released its second album.

== Discography ==
- Ashes of Ares (2013)
- Well of Souls (2018)
- Throne of Iniquity (EP) (2020)
- Emperors and Fools (2022)
- New Messiahs (2025)
