= Bible of the Beast =

Studio album by Powerwolf
- Released: 24 April 2009
- Recorded: 2008–2009
- Studio: Kohlekeller Studio, Germany
- Genre: Power metal; heavy metal
- Length: 47:36
- Language: English; Latin; German
- Label: Metal Blade Records
- Producer: Fredrik Nordström

Powerwolf studio album chronology
| Lupus Dei (2007) | Bible of the Beast (2009) | Blood of the Saints (2011) |

Singles from Bible of the Beast
- 1. "Raise Your Fist, Evangelist" Released: 19 March 2009

Bible of the Beast is the third studio album by German power metal band Powerwolf. The album was released on 24 April 2009. It was recorded at the Studio Fredman in Gothenburg, Sweden.

Powerwolf revealed the details of their third album on 25 February 2009. They revealed the album cover on 3 March 2009.

The album's single "Raise Your Fist, Evangelist" was released on 19 March 2009.

== Critical reception ==
Professional ratings
Review scores
| Source | Rating |
|---|---|
| Danger Dog | 4/5 stars |
| Lords of Metal | (78/100) |
| Metal Hammer | 6/7 stars |
| Metal Storm | 8/10 stars |
| Metal.de | 8/10 stars |
| Rock Hard | 10/10 |

The record was able to place as the band's first album in the German charts and reached number 76.

The Metal Hammer saw Bible of the Beast as the band's best album so far. "Bible of the Beast has everything that Powerwolf excels in – hymns, pounders and humor – but without this time too much to slide into kitsch". The much more aggressive singing of singer Attila Dorn was praised. Metal.de wrote, "Bible of the Beast has become a fast, catchy metal album that will please fans of the bombastic genre in particular. Including orchestral and choral elements, of course, in large quantities". This website also praised Dorn's "extraordinarily good performance". As a listener, however, you have to "bring the necessary breeze tolerance and dark humor to really get started with this music".

The song "Raise Your Fist, Evangelist" was nominated for the Metal Hammer "Metal Anthem 2010" award.

== Track listing ==
All tracks are written by Matthew Greywolf, Charles Greywolf, Attila Dorn, Falk Maria Schlegel and Stéfane Funèbre.

| No. | Title | Length |
|---|---|---|
| 1. | "Opening: Prelude to Purgatory" | 1:12 |
| 2. | "Raise Your Fist, Evangelist" | 4:00 |
| 3. | "Moscow After Dark" | 3:14 |
| 4. | "Panic in the Pentagram" | 5:14 |
| 5. | "Catholic in the Morning... Satanist at Night" | 3:57 |
| 6. | "Seven Deadly Saints" | 3:35 |
| 7. | "Werewolves of Armenia" | 3:54 |
| 8. | "We Take the Church by Storm" | 3:54 |
| 9. | "Resurrection by Erection" | 3:50 |
| 10. | "Midnight Messiah" | 4:12 |
| 11. | "St. Satans Day" | 4:30 |
| 12. | "Wolves Against the World" | 6:04 |
| Total length: | | 47:36 |

The History of Heresy II (2014 bonus tracks)
| No. | Title | Length |
|---|---|---|
| 13. | "Testament in Black" | 4:15 |
| 14. | "Riding the Storm" (Running Wild cover) | 6:39 |
| Total length: | | 58:30 |

== Personnel ==
- Attila Dorn – vocals
- Matthew Greywolf – lead and rhythm guitar
- Charles Greywolf – bass, rhythm guitar
- Stéfane Funèbre – drums, percussion
- Falk Maria Schlegel – organ, keyboards

== Charts ==
| Chart (2009) | Peak position |
|---|---|
| German Albums (Offizielle Top 100) | 76 |
