= Blessed & Possessed =

Studio album by Powerwolf
- Released: 17 July 2015
- Recorded: January–March 2015
- Studio: Studio Fredman, Gothenburg, Sweden
- Genre: Power metal; heavy metal; speed metal
- Length: 45:42; 97:43 (deluxe version)
- Language: English; Latin
- Label: Napalm Records
- Producer: Fredrik Nordström

Powerwolf studio album chronology
Preachers of the Night (2013)	Blessed & Possessed (2015)	The Sacrament of Sin (2018)

Singles from Blessed & Possessed
- 1. "Army of the Night" Released: 8 May 2015; 2. "Armata Strigoi" Released: 5 June 2015

Tour edition cover

Professional ratings
Review scores
Source	Rating
Distorted Sound Magazine	7/10 stars
Metal.de	9/10 stars
Metal Hammer	6/7 stars
Metal Storm	6.8/10
Metal Temple	9/10 stars
metalunderground.com	4/5 stars

Blessed & Possessed is the sixth studio album by German power metal band Powerwolf, released on 17 July 2015 by Napalm Records. The band wrote it during 2014 and began recording it in January 2015 at the Studio Fredman in Gothenburg, Sweden, and was produced by Fredrik Nordström. It was mastered in the Fascination Street Studios by Jens Bogren.

Boxset and earbook editions of the album feature a bonus CD, Metallum Nostrum, which contains 10 songs of different artists that Powerwolf's band members selected to cover. It was re-released separately on 11 January 2019.

== Background ==
Powerwolf began writing their sixth album in June 2014. They finished in the December of the same year. They announced their new album on their Facebook page on 5 December 2014.

They began recording the album in January 2015 at the Studio Fredman in Gothenburg, and the process lasted until March of the same year. They unveiled album's title and the cover art on 18 March 2015. The guitarist Matthew Greywolf stated about the group's new material:

Without revealing too much, you can expect an album that's 100% uncompromising Powerwolf stuff. There's songs to go wild to, there's epic and atmospheric stuff, and a lot of wolfish metal madness in between, and quite a bunch of songs that will be must-plays on any future Powerwolf show, for damn sure.

Before the album was released, the group released two singles, "Army of the Night" and "Armata Strigoi". Both of them were first released only in digital form.

== Critical reception ==
The album was rated positively by the critics. Metal.de wrote: "Blessed & Possessed is already the metal party disc of the year! With powerful riffing, big hooks and the darling dose of kitsch Powerwolf once again created an album in which every song is really a hit!". Metal Hammer saw the song "Higher Than Heaven" as the "highlight of the album".

== Track listing ==
All tracks are written by Matthew Greywolf, Charles Greywolf, Attila Dorn, Falk Maria Schlegel and Roel van Helden.

No.	Title	Length
1.	"Blessed & Possessed"	4:42
2.	"Dead Until Dark"	3:49
3.	"Army of the Night"	3:21
4.	"Armata Strigoi"	3:59
5.	"We Are the Wild"	3:41
6.	"Higher Than Heaven"	3:30
7.	"Christ & Combat"	3:39
8.	"Sanctus Dominus"	3:22
9.	"Sacramental Sister"	4:36
10.	"All You Can Bleed"	3:44
11.	"Let There Be Night"	7:19
Total length:		45:42

Tour edition bonus CD (Preaching at the Breeze)
No.	Title	Length
1.	"Lupus Daemonis (Intro)"
2.	"Sanctified with Dynamite"
3.	"Coleus Sanctus"
4.	"Army of the Night"
5.	"Amen & Attack"
6.	"Resurrection by Erection"
7.	"Armata Strigoi"
8.	"Kreuzfeuer"
9.	"Werewolves of Armenia"
10.	"In the Name of God"
11.	"Blessed & Possessed"
12.	"All We Need Is Blood"
13.	"Dead Boys Don't Cry"
14.	"We Drink Your Blood"
15.	"Lupus Dei"

Boxset & yearbook edition contain a bonus CD, Metallum Nostrum, which was not released separately until 11 January 2019.

== Personnel ==
Powerwolf

- Attila Dorn – vocals
- Matthew Greywolf – lead and rhythm guitar
- Charles Greywolf – bass, rhythm guitar
- Roel van Helden – drums, percussion
- Falk Maria Schlegel – organ, keyboards

Additional musicians

- Helen Vogt – vocals (choir)
- Almut Hellwig – vocals (choir)
- Jennifer Gräßer – vocals (choir)
- Julia Sharon Harz – vocals (choir)
- Anne Diemer – vocals (choir)
- Christoph Höbel – vocals (choir)
- Torsten Peeß – vocals (choir)
- Patrick Staub – vocals (choir)
- Francesco Cottone – vocals (choir)
- Frank Beck – vocals (choir)
- Dirk Reichel – vocals (choir)
- Titan Fox – vocals (choir)
- Björn Hacket – vocals (choir)
- Tobias Engel – vocals (choir)
- Michael Morschett – vocals (choir)
- Alex Handorf – vocals (choir)
- Dirk Bersweiler – vocals (choir)
- James Boyle – vocals (choir)
- Tom Kurt Germann – vocals (choir)
- Daniel Gene Herzmann – vocals (choir)
- Toni Hilbert – vocals (choir)

Technical personnel

- Jens Bogren– mastering
- Sam Braun – editing, recording
- David Buballa – editing, recording
- Charles Greywolf – engineer
- Kristian Kohlmannslehner – engineer
- Fredrik Nordström – mixer
- Henrik Udd – mixer

Other personnel

- Manuela Meyer – photography
- Matthew Greywolf – artwork, layout

== Charts ==
Chart (2015)	Peak position
Austrian Albums (Ö3 Austria)	17
Belgian Albums (Ultratop Flanders)	41
Belgian Albums (Ultratop Wallonia)	59
Dutch Albums (Album Top 100)	70
Finnish Albums (Suomen virallinen lista)	30
German Albums (Offizielle Top 100)	3
Hungarian Albums (MAHASZ)	26
Swedish Albums (Sverigetopplistan)	46
Swiss Albums (Schweizer Hitparade)	10
US Heatseekers Albums (Billboard)	14

=== Sales and certifications ===
Country	Certification (sales thresholds)
Czech Republic	Gold

== Release history ==
Region	Date	Format	Label	Edition(s)	Catalog	Ref.
United States & Europe	17 July 2015	CD	Napalm Records	Standard	NPR 486	
Europe	17 July 2015	2 CD	Napalm Records	Boxed set, limited edition	NPR 586 BO	
United States & Europe	17 July 2015	2 CD, LP	Napalm Records	Boxed set, limited edition	NPR 486	
Europe	17 July 2015	CD	Napalm Records	Standard	NPR 586 JC	
Russia	2015	2 CD	Mazzar Records	Limited edition, digipak	MZR CD 725	
South Korea	July 2015	2 CD	Evolution Music	Deluxe edition	L100005070	
Japan	22 July 2015	2 CD	Avalon	Japan	MICP-90088	
Europe	6 January 2017	2 CD	Napalm Records	Tour edition, digipak	NPR 486	
Russia	2018	CD	Soyuz Music	Standard	SZCD 9993-18	
