= Stormwarrior =

German power metal band

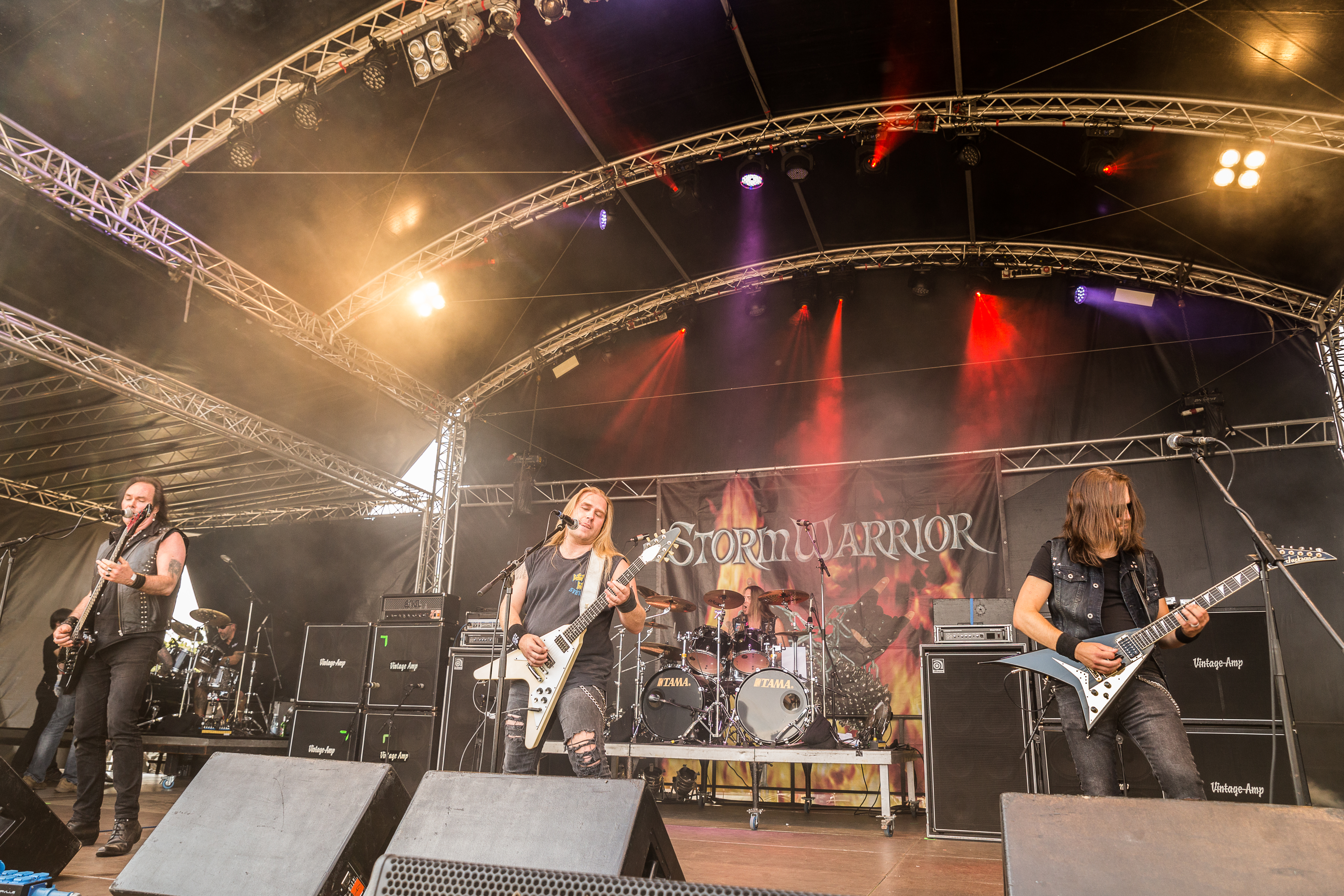
- Stormwarrior at Metal Frenzy 2018

Background information
- Origin: Hamburg, Germany
- Genres: Power metal, speed metal
- Years active: 1998–present
- Labels: Dockyard 1, Remedy, Massacre
- Members: Lars Ramcke; Björn Daigger; Yenz Leonhardt; Falko Reshöft
- Past members: Jaume (Tuno); Jussi Zimmermann; Andre Schumann; Tim Zienert; Gabriel Palermo; David Wiczorek; Alex Guth; Connor Andreszka; Hendrik Thiesbrummel; Jörg Uken
- Website: stormwarrior.de

Stormwarrior is a German power metal band that was formed in 1998 by vocalist and guitar player Lars Ramcke and drummer Andre Schumann, adding later in the same year guitarist Scott Bolter and bass player Tim Zienert. The members of Stormwarrior draw their musical influences from the 80s heavy metal scene including such fellow German bands as Helloween and Running Wild.

Their debut full-length album Stormwarrior, released in 2002, and their 2004 follow up Northern Rage were both produced by Kai Hansen of Helloween and Gamma Ray fame who also contributed vocal and guitar performances on some songs. Much of Stormwarrior's lyrical content deals with Viking-related themes.

== Members ==
=== Current ===
- Lars Ramcke – vocals (1998–present), guitars (1998–2005, 2006–present)
- Björn Daigger – guitars (2014–present)
- Yenz Leonhardt – bass (2007–2017, 2019–present)
- Falko Reshöft – drums (2002–2009, 2019–present)

=== Former ===
- Tim Zienert – bass (1998–2001)
- Gabriele Palermo – bass (2001–2002)
- Andre Schumann – drums (1998–2002)
- Scott Bölter – guitars (1998–2002)
- Jussi Zimmermann – bass (2002–2007)
- David Wiczorek – guitars (2002–2006)
- Alex Guth – guitars (2005–2014)
- Hendrik Thiesbrummel – drums (2009–2013)
- Jörg Uken – drums (2013–2018)
- Connor Andreszka – bass (2017–2018)
Stormwarrior live at Metal Frenzy 2018 in Gardelegen

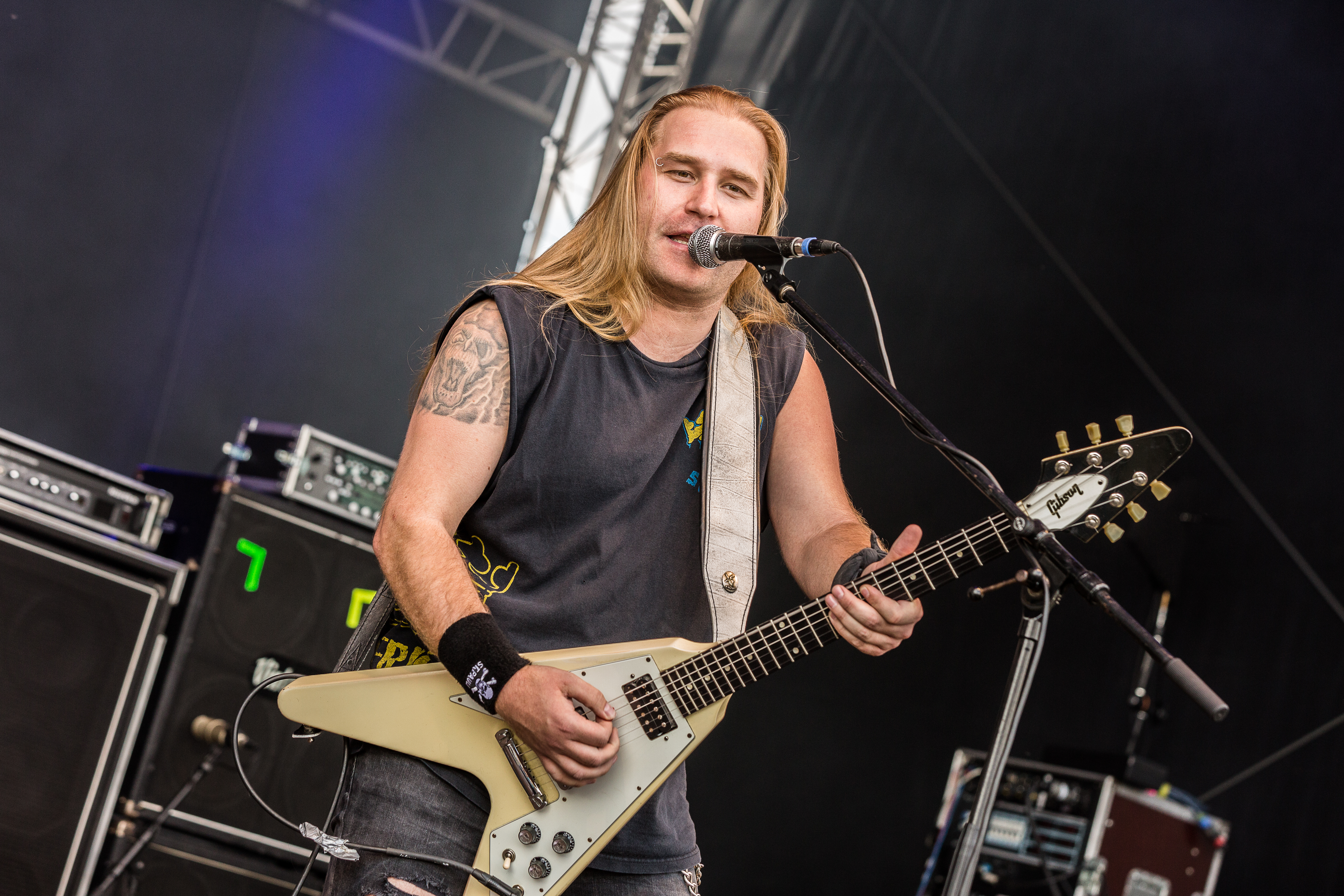
Lars Ramcke

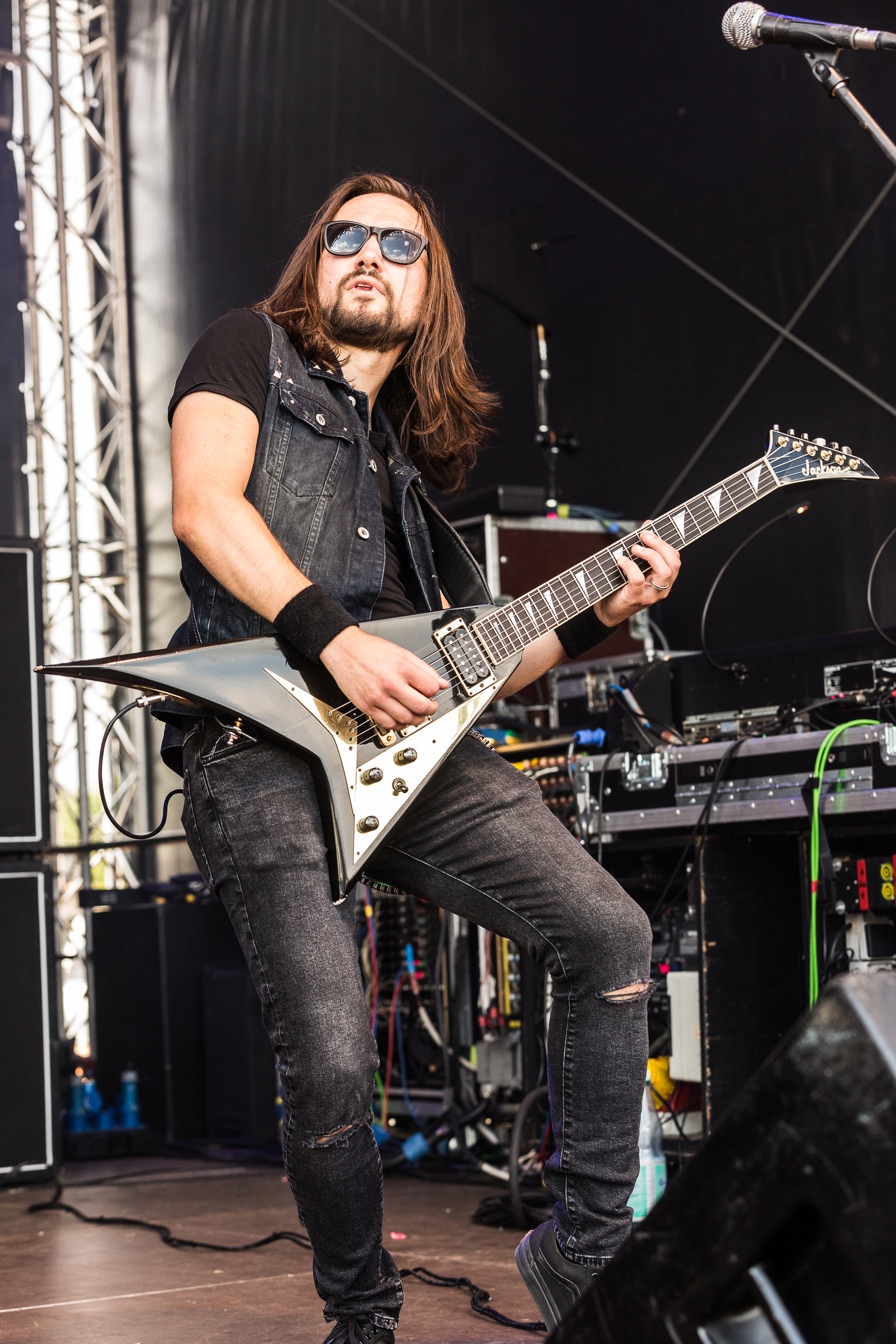
Björn Daigger

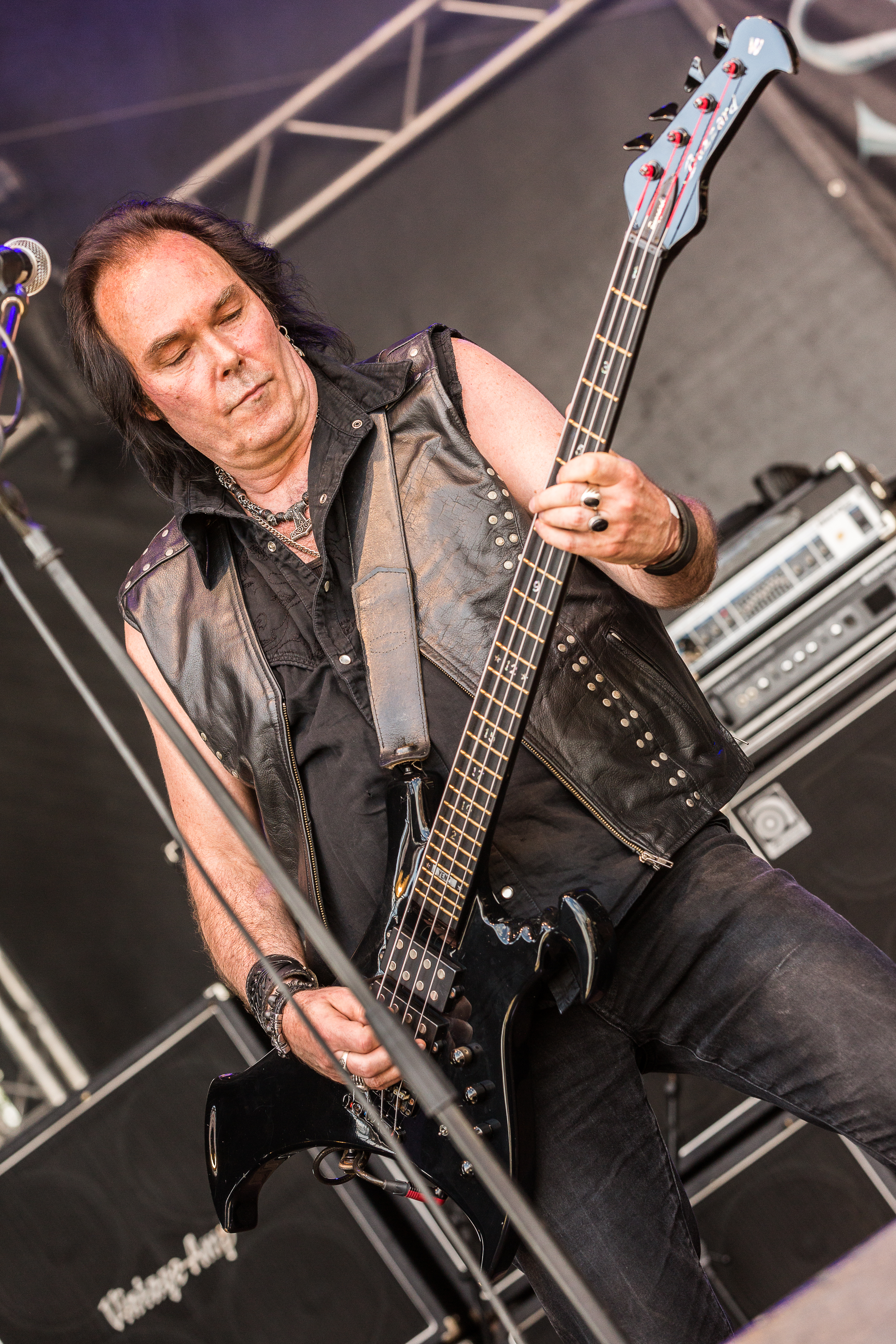
Yenz Leonhardt

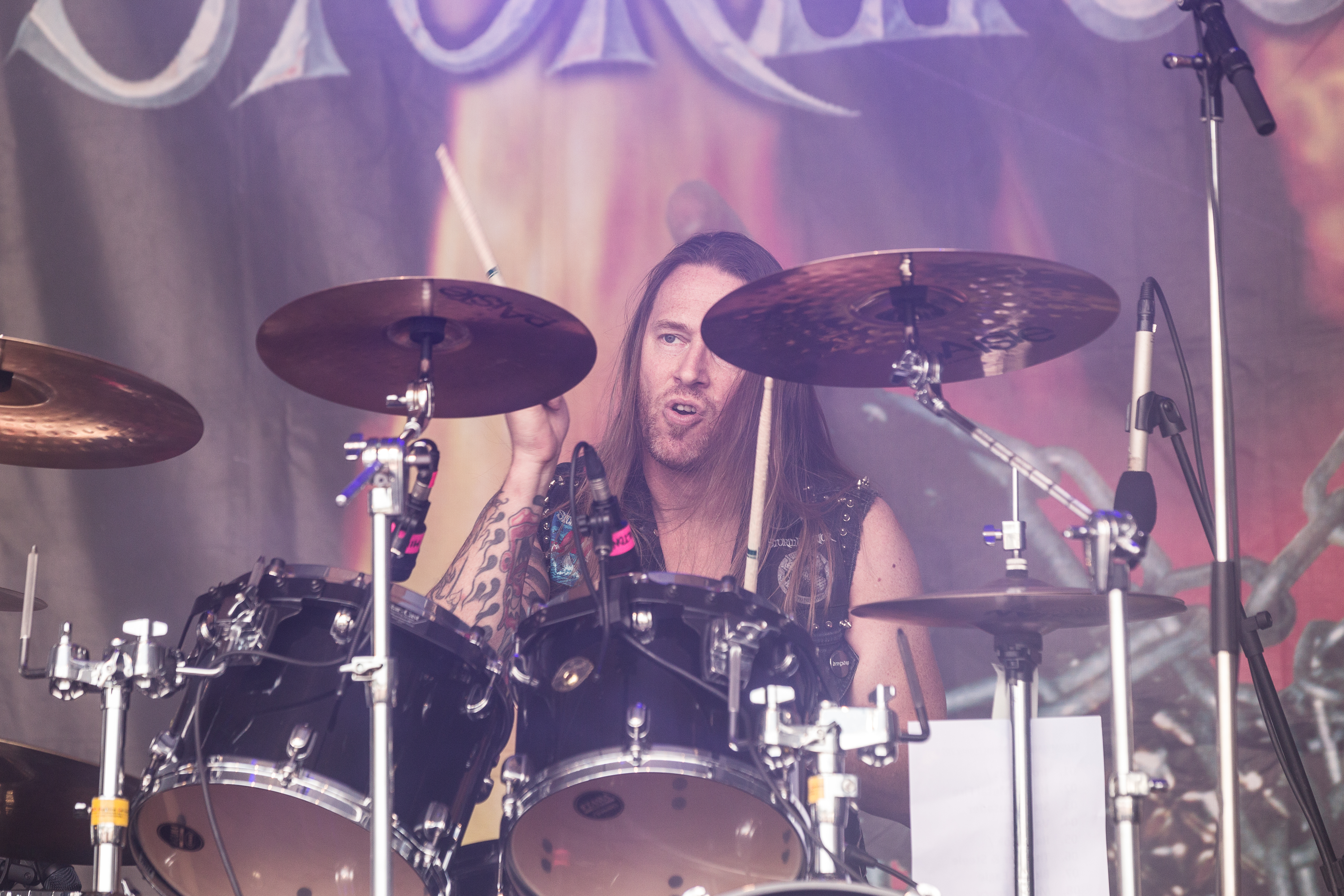
Jörg Uken

== Discography ==
=== Albums ===
- Stormwarrior (2002)
- Northern Rage (2004)
- Heading Northe (2008)
- Heathen Warrior (2011)
- Thunder & Steele (2014)
- Norsemen (2019)

=== Demos / EPs ===
- Metal Victory (1998)
- Barbaric Steel (1999)
- Possessed by Metal (2001)
- Spikes and Leather (2002)
- Heavy Metal Fire (2003)
- Odens Krigare (2004)

=== Live ===
- At Foreign Shores (2006)

== See also ==
- List of power metal bands
- Viking metal
