= Preachers of the Night =

Studio album by Powerwolf
- Released: 19 July 2013
- Recorded: December 2012 – March 2013
- Studios: Studio Fredman, Gothenburg, Sweden
- Genres: Power metal; heavy metal
- Length: 45:32
- Languages: English; Latin; German
- Label: Napalm Records
- Producer: Fredrik Nordström

Powerwolf studio album chronology
Blood of the Saints (2011)	Preachers of the Night (2013)	Blessed & Possessed (2015)

Singles from Preachers of the Night
- 1. "Amen & Attack" Released: 28 June 2013

Professional ratings
Review scores
Source	Rating
Danger Dog	3.5/5 stars
Metal.de	9/10 stars
Metal Hammer	6/7 stars
Metal Hammer Norway	4/10 stars
Metal Storm	7.8/10 stars

Preachers of the Night is the fifth studio album by German power metal band Powerwolf. It was released on 19 July 2013. The band wrote it during 2012 and began recording it in December of the same year at the Studio Fredman in Gothenburg, Sweden.

Critics reacted positively to the album, which became Powerwolf's first number one album on the German charts, while also charting in several other countries.

Much like Blood of the Saints, Preachers of the Night includes in its deluxe version a bonus orchestral CD, titled The Sacrilege Symphony II.

The album's single "Amen & Attack" was released on 28 June 2013.

== Background ==
Powerwolf began writing their fifth album in 2012. They finished in the November of the same year.

They recorded their album in December 2012 at the Studio Fredman in Gothenburg, and the process lasted until March 2013. The album's cover art, created by the band's guitarist Matthew Greywolf, was unveiled on 2 May 2013.

On 11 July 2013, Napalm Records released audio samples of all the tracks from the album on their YouTube channel.

== Critical reception ==
Metal.de commented: "Powerwolf are once again damned in love with detail, the new album is full of majestic opulence and pomp, epic grandeur, sing-along choruses and a healthy dose of self-irony. Effective, resounding, rousing". Metal Hammer wrote: "To be honest: who occupies such a good, reliable and original drawer, must not be accused, in this to persist". The magazine pointed out that the new songs live among other things, because of their "unrestrained speed as extremely effective".

== Track listing ==
All tracks are written by Matthew Greywolf.

No.	Title	Length
1.	"Amen & Attack"	3:54
2.	"Secrets of the Sacristy"	4:07
3.	"Coleus Sanctus"	3:45
4.	"Sacred & Wild"	3:40
5.	"Kreuzfeuer"	3:47
6.	"Cardinal Sin"	3:47
7.	"In the Name of God (Deus Vult)"	3:15
8.	"Nochnoi Dozor"	3:45
9.	"Lust for Blood"	3:54
10.	"Extatum et Oratum"	3:56
11.	"Last of the Living Dead"	7:42
Total length:		45:32

Deluxe edition bonus CD (The Sacrilege Symphony II)
No.	Title	Length
1.	"Amen & Attack (Orchestral Version)"	4:55
2.	"Coleus Sanctus (Orchestral Version)"	5:08
3.	"Kreuzfeuer (Orchestral Version)"	6:03
4.	"Cardinal Sin (Orchestral Version)"	5:21
Total length:		21:27

== Personnel ==
Powerwolf

- Attila Dorn – vocals
- Matthew Greywolf – lead and rhythm guitar
- Charles Greywolf – bass, rhythm guitar
- Roel van Helden – drums, percussion
- Falk Maria Schlegel – organ, keyboards

Additional musicians

- Patrick Staub – vocals (choir)
- Jörg Zimmer – vocals (choir)
- Frank Beck – vocals (choir)
- Philipp Allar – vocals (choir)
- Andreas Schröder – vocals (choir)
- Hans-Peter Kirsch – vocals (choir; bass)
- Peter Kargerer – vocals (choir; bass)
- Edgar Weiß – vocals (choir; bass)
- Helen Vogt – vocals (choir; alto, soprano)
- Annick Tabari – vocals (choir; alto, soprano)
- Anne Diemer – vocals (choir; alto, soprano)
- Christine Kruchten – vocals (choir; alto, soprano)
- Simone Theobald – vocals (choir; alto, soprano)
- Silvana Bergwanger – vocals (choir; alto, soprano)
- Andrea Witting – vocals (choir; alto, soprano)
- Almut Hellwig – vocals (choir; alto, soprano)

Technical personnel

- Kai Stahlenberg – recording, engineer
- Kristian Kohlmannslehner – recording, engineer
- David Buballa – engineer, editing
- Charles Greywolf – bass recording
- Fredrik Nordström – mixer
- Henrik Udd – mixer
- Svante Forsbäck – mastering
- Francesco Cottone – choir conductor

Other personnel

- Manuela Meyer – photography
- Matthew Greywolf – artwork, layout

== Charts ==
Chart (2013)	Peak position
Austrian Albums (Ö3 Austria)	24
Belgian Albums (Ultratop Flanders)	105
Belgian Albums (Ultratop Wallonia)	97
Finnish Albums (Suomen virallinen lista)	49
German Albums (Offizielle Top 100)	1
Swedish Albums (Sverigetopplistan)	50
Swiss Albums (Schweizer Hitparade)	23
