= Call of the Wild (Powerwolf album) =

Studio album by Powerwolf
- Released: 16 July 2021
- Recorded: January–March 2021
- Studio: Fascination Street, Örebro, Sweden
- Genre: Power metal; heavy metal; symphonic metal
- Length: 40:28
- Language: English; Latin; German
- Label: Napalm Records
- Producer: Jens Bogren

Powerwolf studio album chronology
The Sacrament of Sin (2018)	Call of the Wild (2021)	Interludium (2023)

Singles from Call of the Wild
- 1. "Beast of Gévaudan" Released: 20 May 2021; 2. "Dancing with the Dead" Released: 24 June 2021

Call of the Wild is the eighth studio album by German power metal band Powerwolf. Released on 16 July 2021, the work was published through Napalm Records.

== Critical reception ==
Call of the Wild received positive reviews from critics, who praised its direction and production. Paul Travers of Kerrang stated that "The symphonic elements that were really pushed forward on The Sacrament Of Sin carry on where they left off and only serve to make the band even more bombastic". Holly Wright of Louder stated that "Call Of The Wild points at Powerwolf's growing aspirations for domination", going on to state that "The production is shinier and there's a distinct lack of willy jokes, although their heretical romp, "Undress To Confess", preserves the twinkle in their eye".

== Track listing ==
Call of the Wild
No.	Title	Length
1.	"Faster Than the Flame"	4:08
2.	"Beast of Gévaudan"	3:31
3.	"Dancing with the Dead"	4:01
4.	"Varcolac"	3:52
5.	"Alive or Undead"	4:23
6.	"Blood for Blood (Faoladh)"	3:11
7.	"Glaubenskraft" (Power of Faith)	3:56
8.	"Call of the Wild"	3:39
9.	"Sermon of Swords"	3:18
10.	"Undress to Confess"	3:31
11.	"Reverent of Rats"	2:54
Total length:		40:28

Missa Cantorem (Earbook bonus disc)
No.	Title	Length
1.	"Sanctified with Dynamite" (featuring Ralf Scheepers from Primal Fear)	4:29
2.	"Demons Are a Girl's Best Friend" (featuring Alissa White-Gluz from Arch Enemy)	3:42
3.	"Nightside of Siberia" (featuring Johan Hegg from Amon Amarth)	3:57
4.	"Where the Wild Wolves Have Gone" (featuring Doro Pesch)	4:16
5.	"Fist by Fist (Sacralize or Strike)" (featuring Matt Heafy from Trivium)	3:34
6.	"Killers with the Cross" (featuring Björn Strid from Soilwork)	4:14
7.	"Kiss of the Cobra King" (featuring Chris Harms from Lord of the Lost)	3:52
8.	"We Drink Your Blood" (featuring Johannes Eckerström from Avatar)	3:53
9.	"Resurrection by Erection" (featuring Christopher Bowes from Alestorm)	4:07
10.	"Saturday Satan" (featuring Jari Mäenpää from Wintersun)	5:22
Total length:		41:26

== Personnel ==
- Attila Dorn – vocals
- Matthew Greywolf – lead and rhythm guitar
- Charles Greywolf – bass, rhythm guitar
- Roel van Helden – drums, percussion
- Falk Maria Schlegel – organ, keyboards

== Charts ==
Chart (2021)	Peak position
German Albums (Offizielle Top 100)	2
Swiss Albums (Schweizer Hitparade)	5
