= Blood of the Saints =

Studio album by Powerwolf
- Released: 29 July 2011; 17 December 2021 (10th Anniversary Edition)
- Recorded: December 2010 – February 2011
- Studio: Studio Fredman, Gothenburg, Sweden
- Genre: Power metal; heavy metal
- Length: 41:46
- Language: English; Latin; German
- Label: Metal Blade Records
- Producer: Fredrik Nordström

Powerwolf studio album chronology
Bible of the Beast (2009)	Blood of the Saints (2011)	Preachers of the Night (2013)

Singles from Blood of the Saints
- 1. "Sanctified with Dynamite" Released: 24 May 2011; 2. "We Drink Your Blood" Released: 5 July 2011

Professional ratings
Review scores
Source	Rating
Metal.de	9/10 stars
Metal Hammer	6/7 stars

Blood of the Saints is the fourth studio album by German power metal band Powerwolf, released in 2011. It is the band's first album with songs that had music videos, made for We Drink Your Blood and Sanctified with Dynamite. In addition to recording at Studio Fredman, Sweden, the band recorded some parts of the album in the 12th-century Deutschherrenkapelle chapel in Saarbrücken.

A limited edition of Blood of the Saints included a bonus CD titled The Sacrilege Symphony (And Still the Orchestra Plays), which contained orchestral versions of Powerwolf songs. It was arranged by Dominic G. Joutsen, who previously worked for the metal band Heavenwood.

== Critical reception ==
The record reached position number 23 in the German charts and 75 in the Swiss charts.

Metal.de wrote about the album: "This is a very melodic power metal sounding from the speakers, which impresses above all through catchiness and a powerful sing along factor. At least after the second run everyone will be able to sing along at least the choruses. Of course this is again due to the powerful yet clear voice of Attila Dorn, who has now finally given up his accent. He sings even more aggressively. The Metal Hammer judged: "Certainly: Powerwolf let their musical influences always open through, and if you listen well, the trained ear recognizes very quickly riff quotes from bands like Iron Maiden, Judas Priest or Accept. But how can you blame the wolves for creating excellent songwriting?"

The album won the Metal Hammer "Power metal album of the year" award.

== Track listing ==
All tracks are written by Matthew Greywolf, Charles Greywolf, Attila Dorn and Falk Maria Schlegel.

No.	Title	Length
1.	"Opening: Agnus Dei"	0:48
2.	"Sanctified with Dynamite"	4:25
3.	"We Drink Your Blood"	3:42
4.	"Murder at Midnight"	4:47
5.	"All We Need Is Blood"	3:38
6.	"Dead Boys Don't Cry"	3:25
7.	"Son of a Wolf"	3:59
8.	"Night of the Werewolves"	4:30
9.	"Phantom of the Funeral"	3:09
10.	"Die, Die, Crucify"	3:00
11.	"Ira Sancti (When the Saints Are Going Wild)"	6:25
Total length:		41:46

Limited edition bonus CD (The Sacrilege Symphony)
No.	Title	Length
1.	"Raise Your Fist, Evangelist (Orchestral Version)"	4:30
2.	"In Blood We Trust (Orchestral Version)"	4:50
3.	"Sanctified With Dynamite (Orchestral Version)"	5:26
4.	"Ira Sancti (When the Saints Are Going Wild) (Orchestral Version)"	5:28
5.	"Moscow After Dark (Orchestral Version)"	5:31
Total length:		25:45

== Personnel ==
Powerwolf

- Attila Dorn – vocals
- Matthew Greywolf – lead and rhythm guitar
- Charles Greywolf – bass, rhythm guitar
- Falk Maria Schlegel – organ, keyboards

Additional musicians

- Roel van Helden – drums, percussion
- Marcel Sude – spoken words
- Gerhard Dilk – vocals (choir; bass)
- Bardo Stahl – vocals (choir; bass)
- Till Gros – vocals (choir; bass)
- Peter Kargerer – vocals (choir; bass)
- Thorsten Peeß – vocals (choir; bass)
- Ulrich Hinterberg – vocals (choir; tenor)
- Marin Traue – vocals (choir; tenor)
- Sebastian Koch – vocals (choir; tenor)
- Florian Keller – vocals (choir; tenor)
- Marco Korz – vocals (choir; tenor)
- Heinz Seger – vocals (choir; tenor)
- Christian Kuhn – vocals (choir; tenor)
- Jens Fried – vocals (choir; tenor)
- Rouven Bitz – vocals (choir; tenor)
- Dirk Reichel – vocals (choir; tenor)
- Frank Beck – vocals (choir; tenor)
- Christoph Höbel – vocals (choir; tenor)
- Ute Gapp – vocals (choir; alto)
- Britta Bethscheider – vocals (choir; alto)
- Bianca Bethscheider – vocals (choir; alto)
- Julia Sharon Harz – vocals (choir; alto)
- Charlotte Hess – vocals (choir; alto)
- Helen Vogt – vocals (choir; soprano)
- Karin Trautwein – vocals (choir; soprano)
- Christine Kruchten – vocals (choir; soprano)
- Anne Diemer – vocals (choir; soprano)
- Angela Streit – vocals (choir; soprano)
- Eva Gehring – vocals (choir; soprano)
- Maria Speicher – vocals (choir; soprano)
- Bianca-Patricia Wegner – vocals (choir; soprano)
- Emily Schmitz – vocals (choir; soprano)

Technical personnel

- Kristian Kohlmannslehner – engineer, recording, editing
- Fredrik Nordström – mixer
- Henrik Udd – mixer
- Peter In de Betou – mastering
- Kai Stahlenberg – recording, editing
- David Buballa – engineer, editing
- Francesco Cottone – choir conductor
- Charles Greywolf – bass engineer
- Rouven Bitz – choir conductor

Other personnel

- Manuela Meyer – photography
- Matthew Greywolf – artwork, layout

== Charts ==
Chart (2011)	Peak position
German Albums (Offizielle Top 100)	23
Swiss Albums (Schweizer Hitparade)	75

Chart (2021)	Peak position
German Albums (Offizielle Top 100)	18
