= Roel van Helden =

Dutch drummer

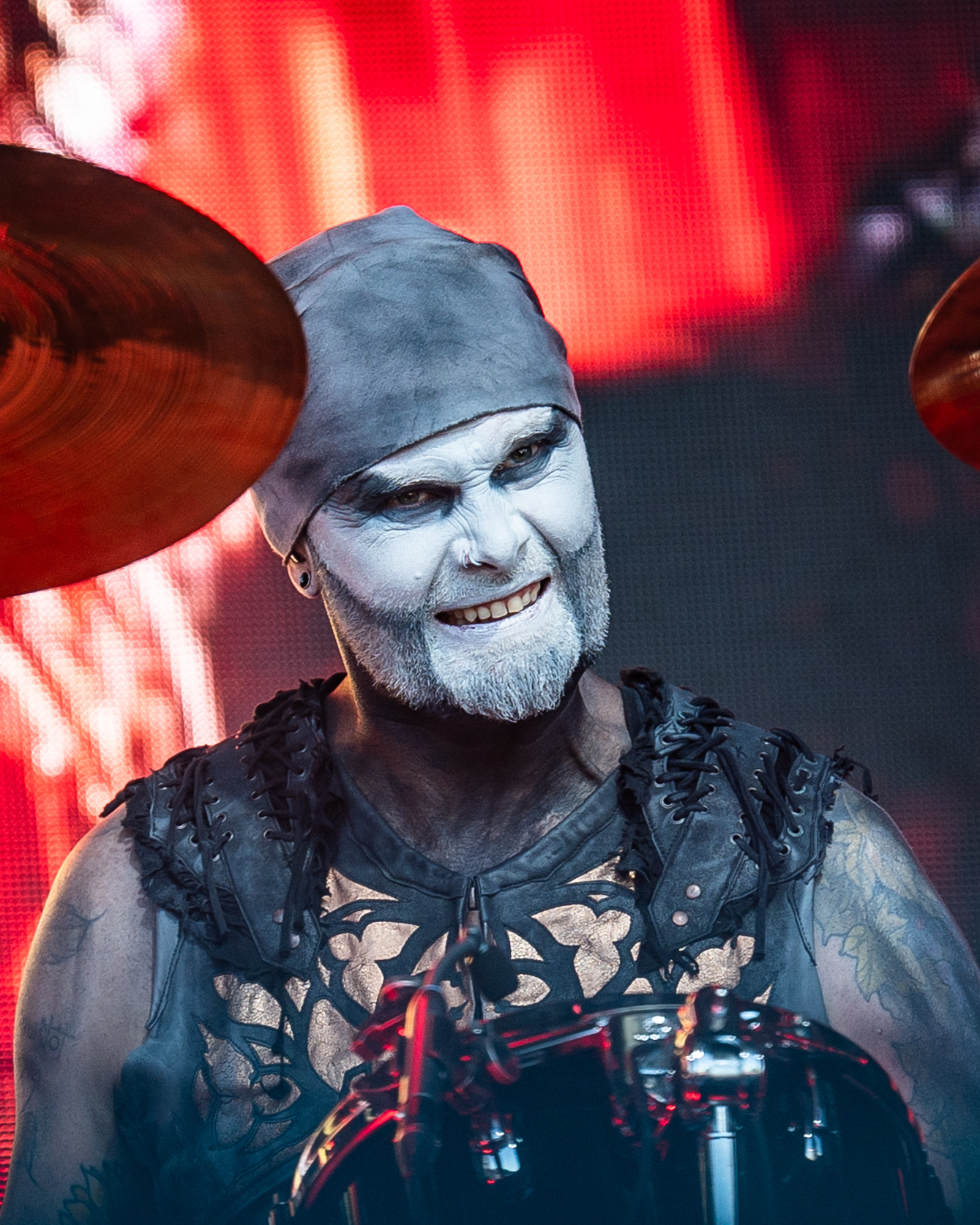
- Van Helden with Powerwolf at Tons of Rock 2025

Background information
- Born: 2 September 1980 (age 45); Lottum, Limburg, Netherlands
- Genres: Heavy metal; power metal; progressive metal; gothic metal; death metal; progressive rock; punk rock
- Occupations: Drummer
- Years active: 1991–present

Roel van Helden (born 2 September 1980) is a Dutch musician known mostly for his work as a drummer for German power metal band Powerwolf.

== Career ==
He played in DVPLO, Gramoxone, Marcel Coenen, My Favorite Scar, Subsignal, and Sun Caged. He currently plays in Powerwolf, Delphian, Lites over Fenix and System Pilot.

He joined Powerwolf replacing Tom Diener in 2011.

On 25 October 2012 he released his debut solo album RvH.

== Discography ==
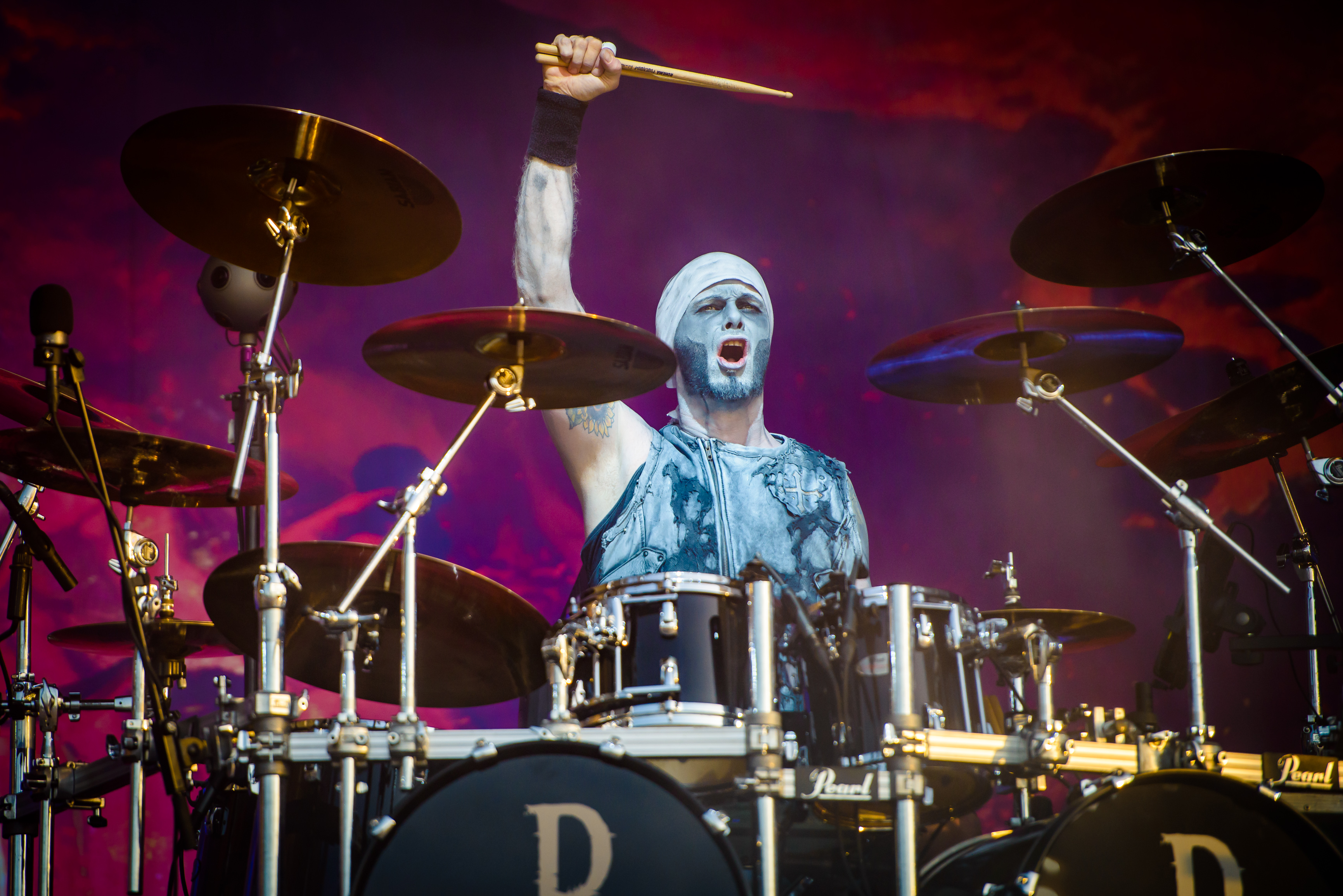
Van Helden performing in 2019

- RvH (2012)

=== With Powerwolf ===
- Blood of the Saints (2011)
- Preachers of the Night (2013)
- Blessed & Possessed (2015)
- The Sacrament of Sin (2018)
- Call of the Wild (2021)
- Interludium (2023)
- Wake Up the Wicked (2024)

=== With Delphian ===
- Demo (2004)
- Oracle (2005)
- Unravel (2007)

=== With Lites over Fenix ===
- From Dust E.P. (2008)

=== With DVPLO ===
- Demo #1 (1998)
- Promo '98 (1998)
- Demo #2 (1999)
- Peaceful Easy End (2000)

=== With Subsignal ===
- Beautiful & Monstrous (2009)
- Touchstones (2011)

=== With Sun Caged ===
- Artemisia (2007)
- The Lotus Effect (2011)
