= Wolfsnächte Tour 2015 =

2015 concert tour by Powerwolf

- Tour by Powerwolf
- Promotional image for the tour, with tour dates
- Location: Europe
- Associated album: Blessed & Possessed
- Start date: 3 September 2015
- End date: 7 November 2015
- No. of shows: 23
- Supporting acts: Orden Ogan, Xandria, Civil War

Powerwolf concert chronology
- Wolfsnächte Tour 2013 (2013); Wolfsnächte Tour 2015 (2015); Blessed & Possessed Tour (2016)

The Wolfsnächte Tour 2015 was a European concert tour by German power metal band Powerwolf. Supporting the release of their sixth studio album Blessed & Possessed, the tour ran from 3 September 2015 to 7 November 2015, taking place in Switzerland, Germany, Netherlands, United Kingdom, France, Hungary, Austria, Czech Republic and Belgium.

== Background ==
Powerwolf's sixth album Blessed & Possessed was released on 17 July 2015. The tour was announced shortly after the release of the album. Orden Ogan, Xandria and Civil War were selected to serve a series of opening acts for Powerwolf during the tour. The tour was set to begin on 3 September 2015 at the Z7 in Pratteln, Switzerland. It was set to end on 7 November 2015 at the Garage in the band's hometown Saarbrücken.

Powerwolf released the Wolfsnächte 2015 Tour EP, a split EP with Orden Ogan, Xandria, and Civil War. This EP featured a previously unreleased Powerwolf track, "Stronger than the Sacrament". Copies of this EP were originally distributed along with the purchase of tickets to the tour.

== Set list ==
This setlist is representative of the show on 25 October 2015 in Budapest, Hungary, at the Barba Negra Music Club. It does not represent all dates throughout the tour.

1. "Lupus Daemonis" (Note: Song played from tape.)
2. "Blessed & Possessed"
3. "Coleus Sanctus"
4. "Amen & Attack"
5. "Cardinal Sin"
6. "Army of the Night"
7. "Resurrection by Erection"
8. "Armata Strigoi"
9. Drum solo
10. "Dead Boys Don't Cry"
11. "Let There Be Night"
12. "Werewolves of Armenia"
13. "In the Name of God (Deus Vult)"
14. "We Drink Your Blood"
15. "Lupus Dei"
16. "Opening: Prelude to Purgatory" (Note: Song played from tape.)
17. "Opening: Agnus Dei' (Note: Song played from tape.)
18. "Sanctified With Dynamite"
19. "Kreuzfeuer"
20. "All We Need Is Blood"
21. "Wolves Against the World" (Note: Song played from tape.)

== Tour dates ==
List of concerts, showing date, city, and country
Date	City	Country
3 September 2015	Pratteln	Switzerland
4 September 2015	Speyer	Germany
5 September 2015	Cologne	Germany
6 September 2015	Leiden	Netherlands
9 September 2015	London	United Kingdom
10 September 2015	Paris	France
11 September 2015	Vevey	Switzerland
12 September 2015	Strasbourg	France
1 October 2015	Bremen	Germany
2 October 2015	Oberhausen	Germany
3 October 2015	Hamburg	Germany
4 October 2015	Nijmegen	Netherlands
22 October 2015	Berlin	Germany
23 October 2015	Leipzig	Germany
24 October 2015	Munich	Germany
25 October 2015	Budapest	Hungary
26 October 2015	Vienna	Austria
27 October 2015	Prague	Czech Republic
29 October 2015	Ravensburg	Germany
30 October 2015	Geiselwind	Germany
31 October 2015	Stuttgart	Germany
1 November 2015	Antwerp	Belgium
7 November 2015	Saarbrücken	Germany
