= Menara =

Menara (Arabic: المنارة) is the Arabic term for lighthouse tower, other words are derived from this term including the Islamic Minaret.

The term Menara can also refer to:

== Places ==
=== Indonesia ===
- Jakarta Tower, a tower located in Jakarta, Indonesia

=== Israel ===
- Menara, Israel, a kibbutz in Israel

=== Malaysia ===
- Menara Warisan Merdeka, a megatall skyscraper in Kuala Lumpur
- Menara Petronas, a twin skyscrapers in Kuala Lumpur
- Menara TRX, an office skyscraper in Kuala Lumpur
- Menara KL, a tower building in Kuala Lumpur
- Menara Telekom, the headquarters of Telekom Malaysia in Kuala Lumpur
- Menara Mesiniaga, a futuristic building in Malaysia
- Menara Alor Star, a telecommunication tower located in Kedah
- Menara Taming Sari, a gyro tower in Malacca City

=== Morocco ===
- Menara, Maroc Telecom, a Moroccan internet access provider; a subsidiary of Maroc Telecom
- Menara gardens, gardens located at Marrakech
- Marrakesh Menara Airport, the international airport of Marrakech

=== Spain ===
- Almenara is a municipality located in the province of Castellón, Valencian Community, Spain.

=== Tunisia ===
- Bab Menara (Arabic: باب منارة) is one of the gates of the medina of Tunis.

== Plant ==
- Menara (tree), the name of a Shorea faguetiana, the tallest documented angiosperm.
