= Gods and Generals =

Gods and Generals may refer to:

- Gods and Generals (novel), a 1996 novel by Jeff Shaara
- Gods and Generals (film), a film adaptation released in 2003
- Gods and Generals (video game), a 2003 video game published alongside the film
- Gods and Generals (soundtrack), the soundtrack to the 2003 film, includes an otherwise unreleased song by Bob Dylan
- Gods and Generals (album), a 2015 studio album by Civil War
