= Freizeit-Land Geiselwind =

Amusement park near Geiselwind, Germany

- Previously known as Vogel-Pony-Märchenpark
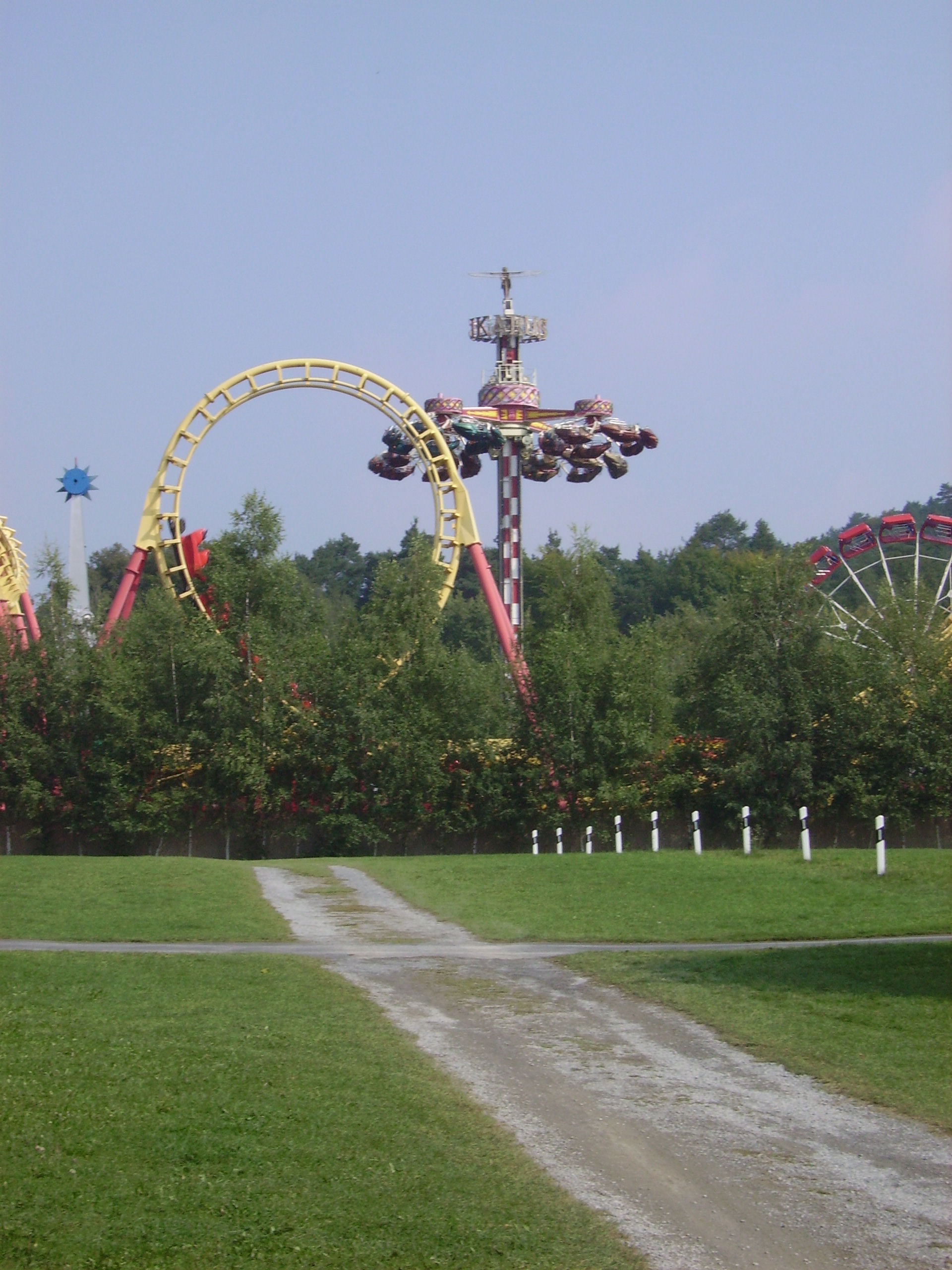
- Interactive map of Freizeit-Land Geiselwind
- Coordinates: 49°46′49″N 10°27′27″E
- Status: Operating
- Opened: June 29, 1969; 57 years ago
- Owner: Matthias Mölter
- Attendance: >250000 (2019)
- Area: 55 ha (140 acres)

Freizeit-Land Geiselwind is an amusement park near Geiselwind, Germany. Covering 55 hectares, the park offers over 100 attractions, including 6 roller coasters.

== History ==
The park was founded in 1969 by Ernst Mensinger under the name "Vogel-Pony-Märchenpark" (fairy tale park with birds and ponies). It was opened next to a newly built section of the Federal Motorway A3. In the beginning, the park had a focus on animals. Later, more and more amusement rides were added. For several decades Acapulco divers entertained the visitors.

The new owner after the death of Mensinger in 2017 is Matthias Mölter.

== Roller Coasters ==
Ride Name	Opened	Manufacturer	Model/Type	Max. Height	Length
Boomerang	2000	Vekoma	Boomerang	35.5 m	285 m
Cobra	2018	Interpark	Wild Wind	10.1 m	200 m
Blauer Enzian	1989	Mack Rides	Blauer Enzian		234 m
Piraten Spinner	1994	Zierer	Spinning Coaster		100 m
Doggy Dog	2017	SBF Visa Group	Family Coaster		
Drachen Höhle	2019	Zierer	Hell Diver	6.9 m	384 m

The last four roller coasters don't have an inversion. Cobra has one inversion and Boomerang three (six per ride).

== Further attractions ==
Name	Picture	Type	Opened	Manufacturer
Flugmaschine		Condor	1994	Huss
Piraten Schleuder		Breakdance	1994	Huss
Top of the World		Gyro tower	1998/1999	Nauta-Bussink
Tower of Fear		Drop tower	2017	Rodlsberger
Volcano		Shot'N Drop	2003/2018	Huss
Wildwasserbahn		Log flume	2017	Reverchon Industries
Auge des Drachen		Dance Party	2019	SBF Visa Group
Merlin and the Magic Circle		Sling Shot	2021	Funtime

This list of attractions is incomplete.

== Gallery ==
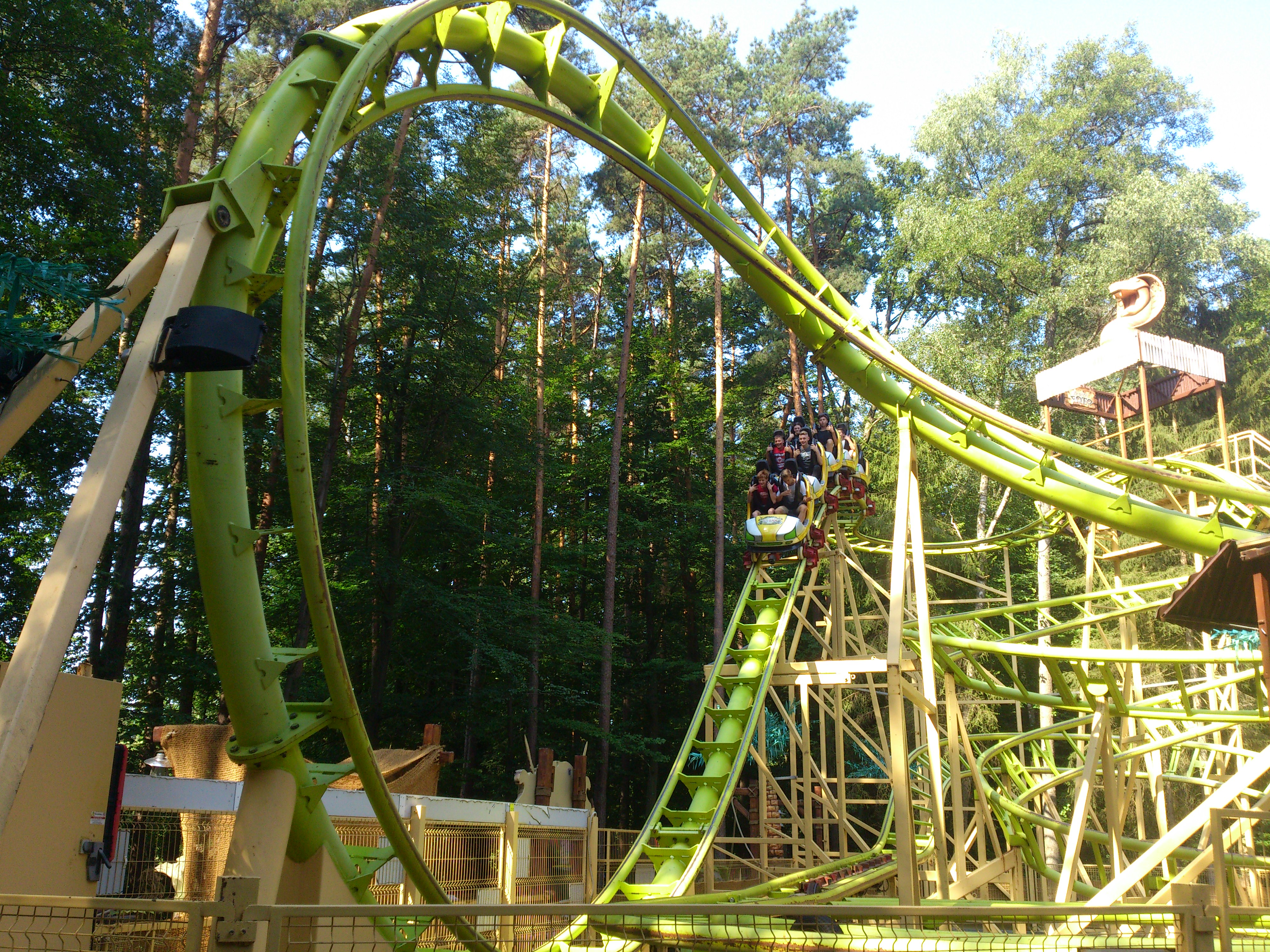
Cobra

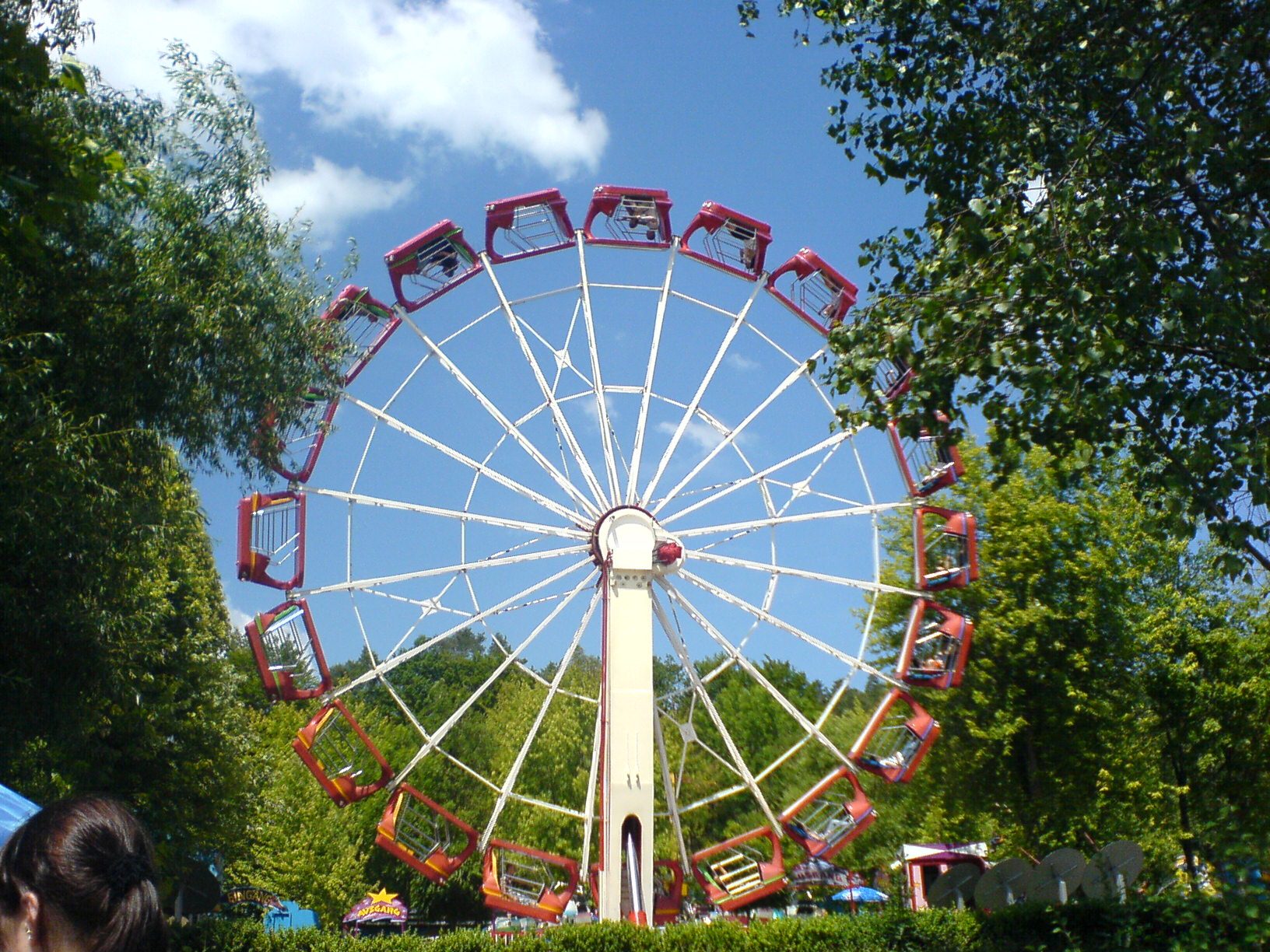
Enterprise (1992–2019)

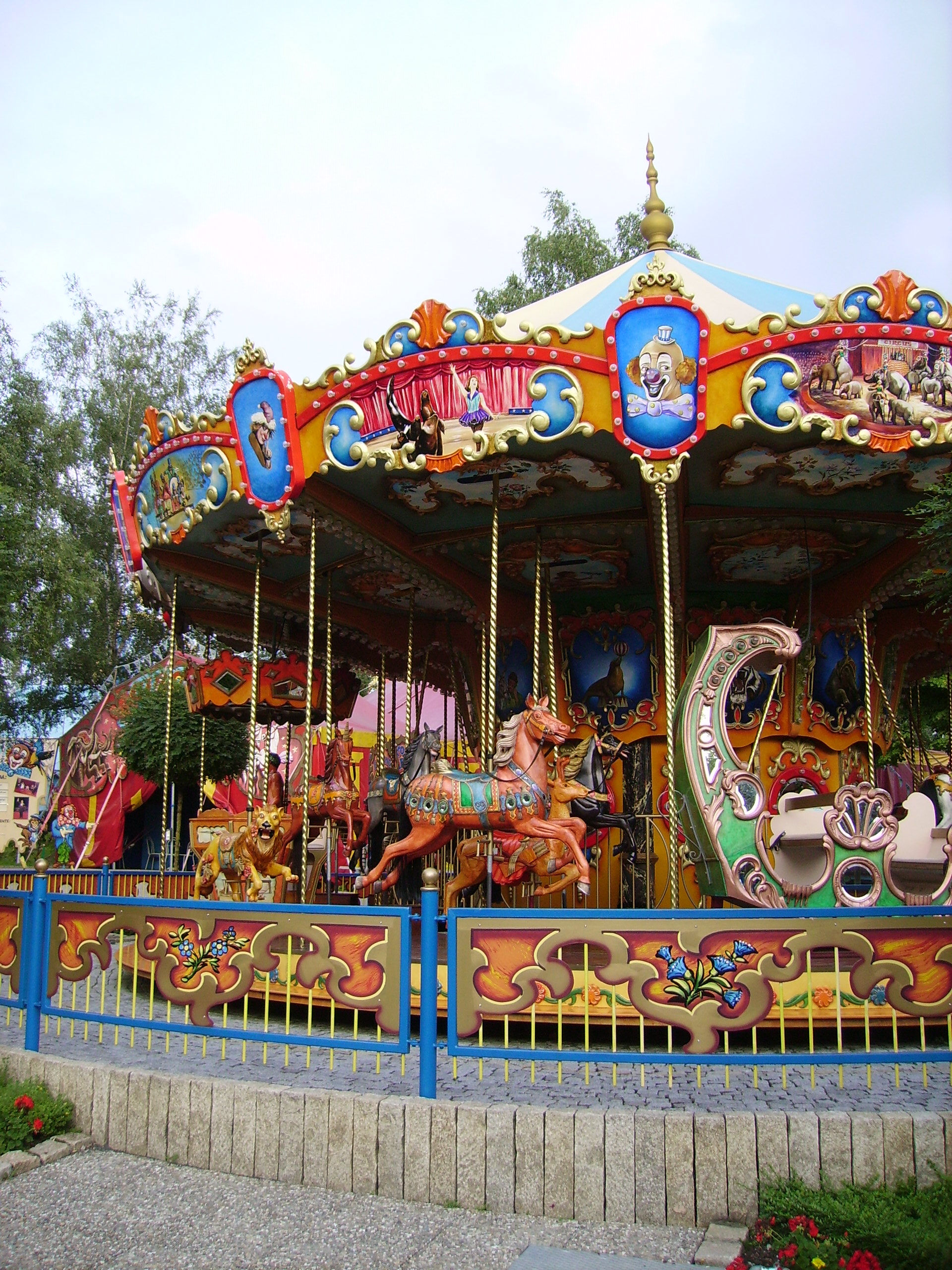
Carousel

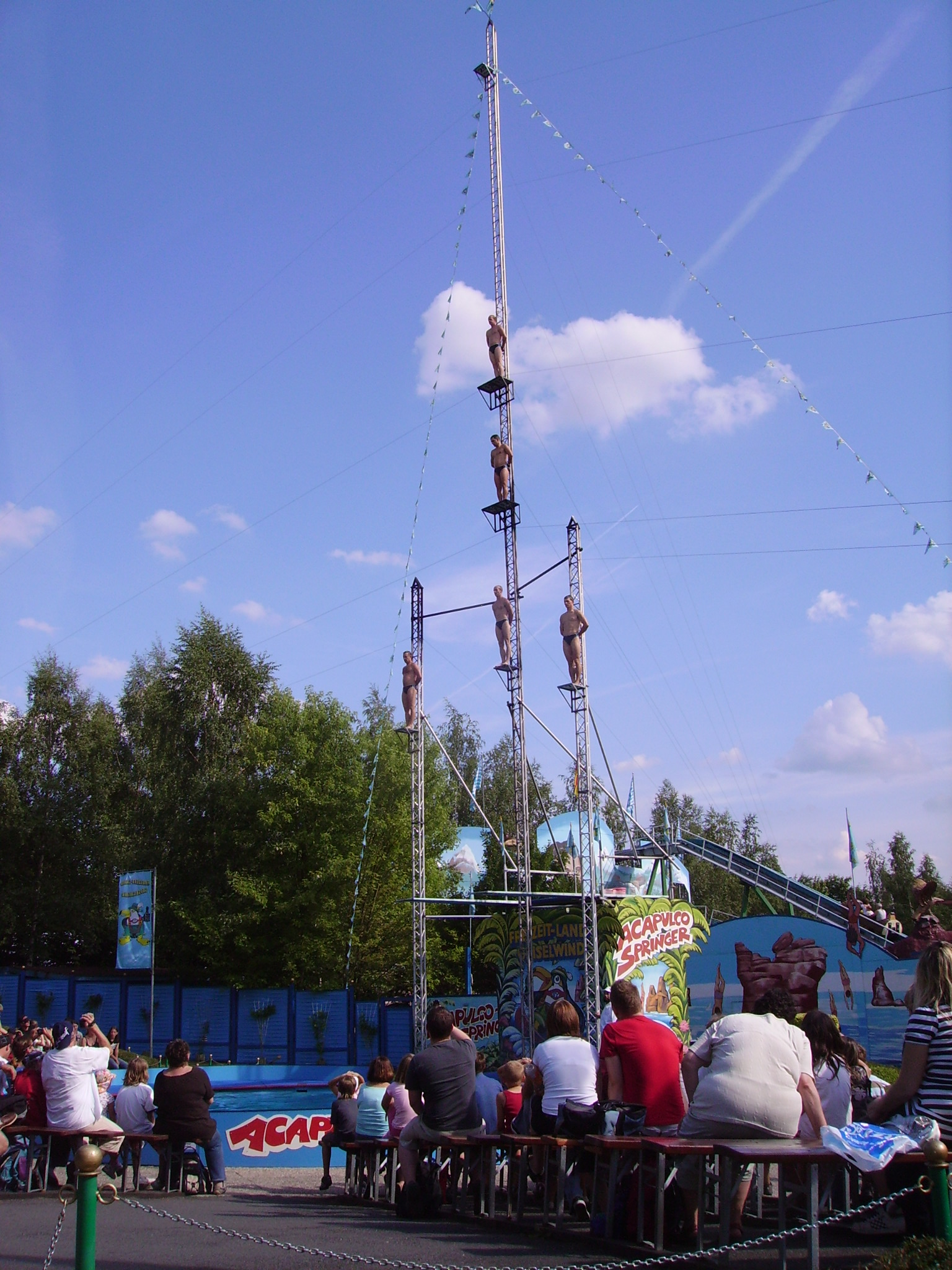
Acapulco divers
