= Holstein Tower =

Observational gyro tower at Hansa-Park

Coordinates: 54°04′27″N 10°46′45″E

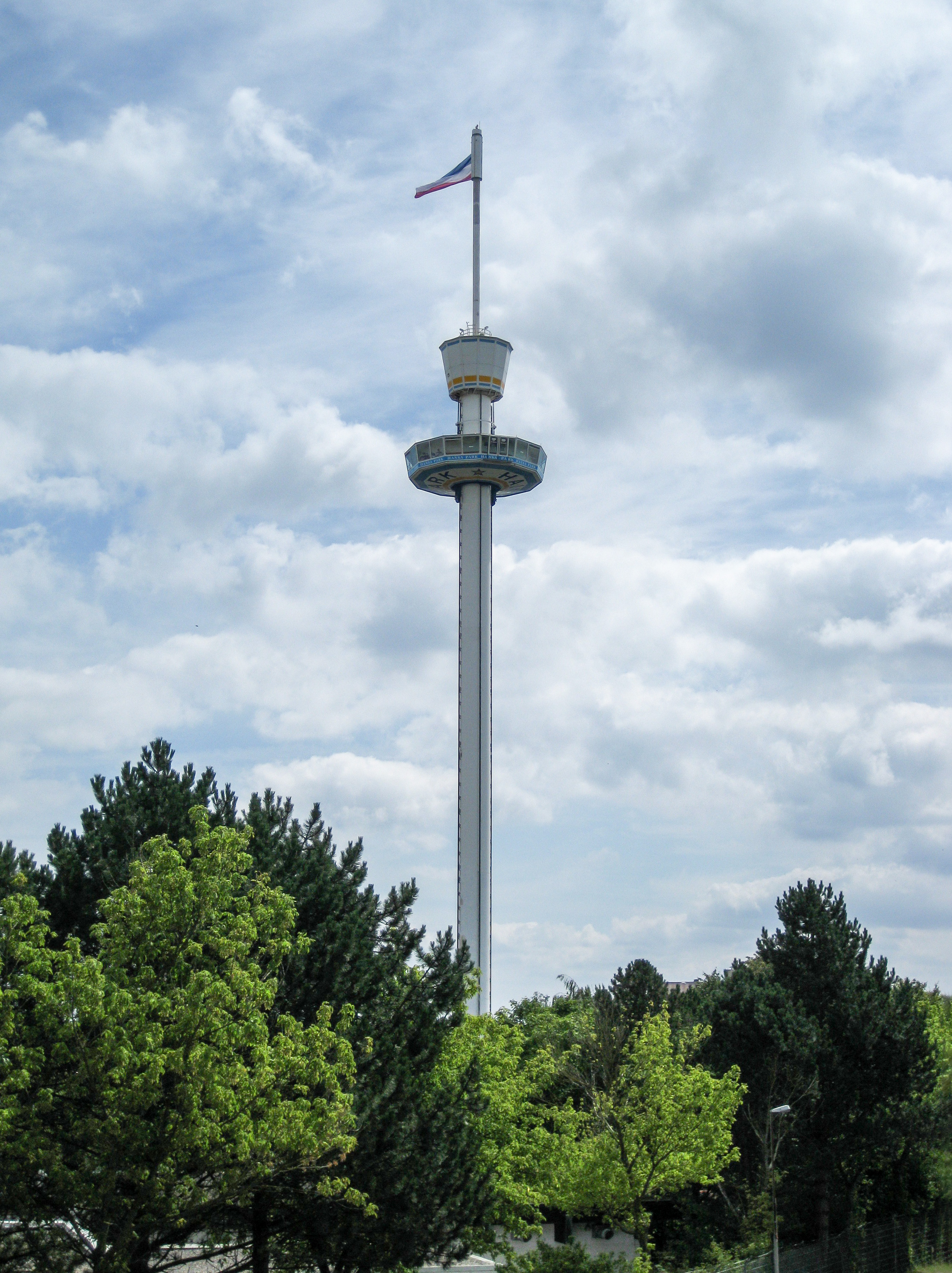
Holstein Tower.

The Holstein Tower (German: Holsteinturm) was a 100 metres (330 ft) high gyro tower that serves as a landmark for the Bay of Lübeck and Neustadt. It was located at Hansa Park in Sierksdorf, Schleswig-Holstein, Germany and was built in 1988, opposite many other similar structures additionally guyed at the machine unit.

== Technical information ==
The glazed gondola rotated clockwise at a speed of approx. 1.2 metres per second (3.9 ft/s) to a height of approx. 70 metres (230 ft), so that one had a view over the entire Bay of Neustadt and, in good weather, even as far as Lübeck. The tower diameter measured 2.5 metres (8.2 ft).

The gondola could accommodate up to 72 guests. The ride had an hourly capacity of around 900 people.

== Particularities ==
The entire tower resembles a traditional ship's mast. On the machine house at the top of the tower there was a large flagpole with the flag of Schleswig-Holstein in a size of approx. 30 square metres (320 sq ft), which was however retracted in the visible protective cover during the closed winter season and in bad weather. For technical reasons, the passenger gondola remained positioned at the highest point during the closed winter season, and overnight in the middle of the tower during the open season.

The Holstein Tower was the highest attraction in Hansa Park from its opening until the 2019 season, but was then replaced by the Highlander gyro drop tower with a total height of 120 meters.

== See also ==
- List of towers
