= Top of the World (ride) =

Coordinates: 49°46′47″N 10°27′36″E

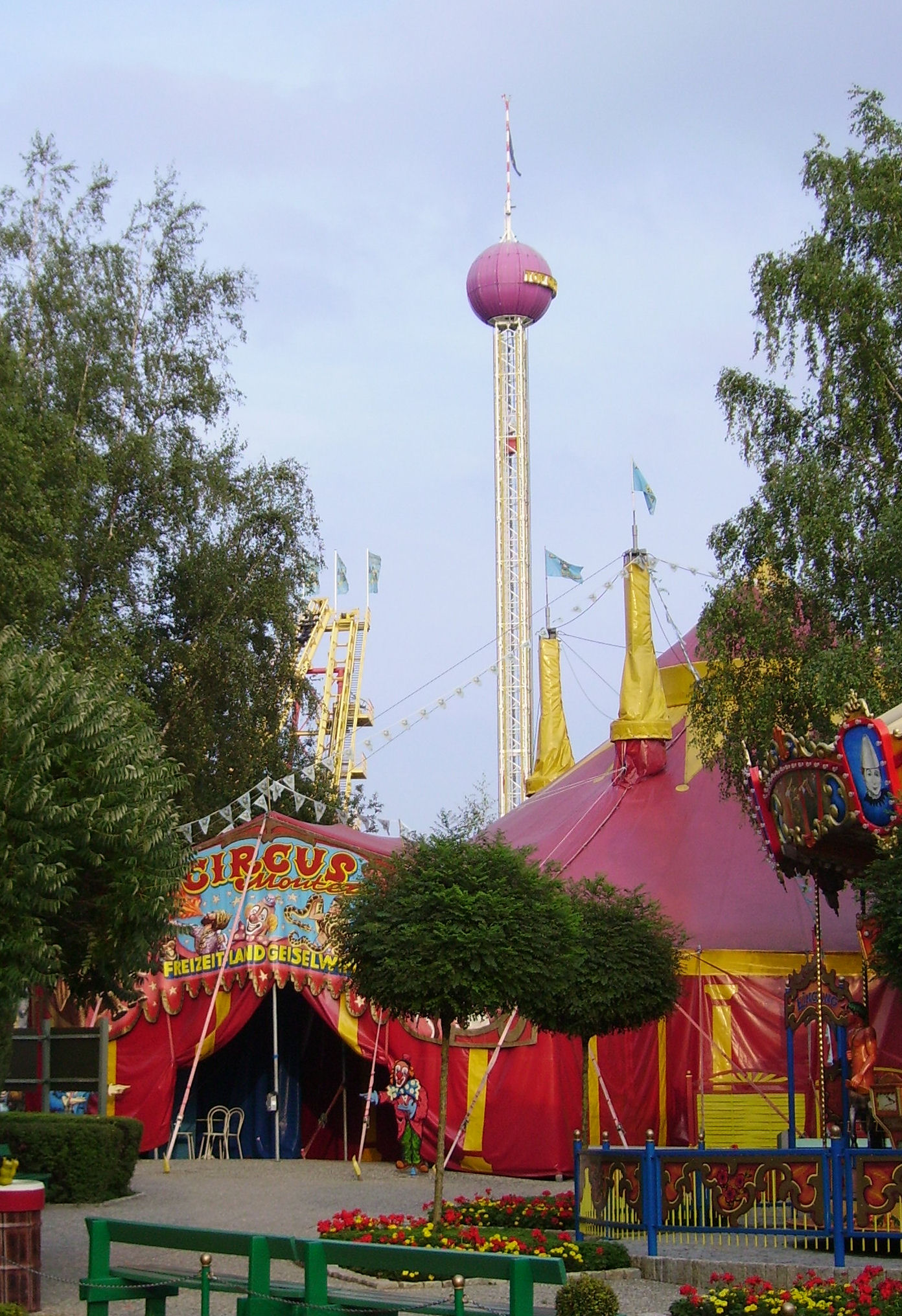
Top of the World in the background

Top of the World is the name of a fairground ride in Geiselwind, Germany.

The 95-meter-high (312-foot) gyro tower is the tallest transportable amusement ride in the world, as well as the highest transportable observation tower.

Top of the World is a so-called gyro tower, i.e. it has a circular gallery that is raised while rotating around the tower. The cabin can accommodate up to 132 people while being raised up to 72 meters. The tower was built for Finnendahl, a carny from Bremen, by the Dutch company Nauta-Bussink.

In 1995, during its premiere at the Christmas Market in Berlin-Friedrichshain the cold caused an incident. Due to the cold the engine of the tower and the emergency brakes prevented the automatic rise and descent of the gondola, which then had to be lowered manually with a special machine. This caused the rope to slip and, after falling for a few centimeters, the gondola crashed onto the podium. Several passengers were injured.

The ride was later sold to the amusement park Freizeit-Land Geiselwind, where it is operating to this day. On 3 September 2019 at about 4:30 pm the ride switched to emergency mode for unknown reasons, causing the observation platform to get stuck 60 meters above ground. Twenty-one people, including eleven children, were let down on ropes with the help of the army, an air rescue service and the police. During the rescue one child was slightly injured.
