= Shadow Cabinet of Italy =

Shadow Cabinet of Italy may refer to:

- Shadow Cabinet of Italy (1989), launched by Alessandro Natta after the 1987 Italian general election
- Shadow Cabinet of Italy (2008), announced by Walter Veltroni after the 2008 Italian general election

== See also ==
- Shadow Cabinet (disambiguation)
