= Far from the Madding Crowd (album) =

Studio album by Wuthering Heights
- Released: January 19, 2004
- Recorded: 2003
- Genre: Progressive metal, folk metal, speed metal, Viking metal, power metal
- Length: 61:25, 67:06 (Japanese edition)
- Label: Sensory
- Producer: Tommy Hansen

Wuthering Heights chronology
To Travel for Evermore (2002)	Far from the Madding Crowd (2004)	The Shadow Cabinet (2006)

Professional ratings
Review scores
Source	Rating
Roadie Metal	8/10

Far from the Madding Crowd is the third full-length album by Danish band Wuthering Heights, their first with current lead vocalist Nils Patrik Johansson. It has been received with great reviews, though "Only subtle approaches remain from the former neoclassical Speed Metal; instead, the quintet serves us a very high proportion of folk on the third album, which easily brings the band on a par with the audience favorites from FALCONER.

"Well, the comparison lags a bit at first glance, as WUTHERING HEIGHTS are still rooted in progressive Melodic Metal, but the guys around Erik Ravn manage to bridge the gap from melodic Speed Metal to Viking Metal and are convincing across the board."

== Track listing ==
All songs written by Erik Ravn.

1. Gather Ye Wild - 01:46
2. The Road Goes Ever On - 07:52
3. Tree - 05:06
4. Longing for the Woods (Part 1: The Wild Children) - 05:37
5. Highland Winds - 06:58
6. Longing for the Woods (Part 2: The Ring of Fire) - 06:17
7. The Bollard (The McGalster Clan cover) - 03:32
8. Bad Hobbits Die Hard - 03:23
9. Longing for the Woods (Part 3: Herne's Prophecy) - 08:41
10. Land of Olden Glory - 06:21
11. Lament for Lórien - 05:52

Japanese edition bonus track:
12. Memory Within a Memory - 05:41

== Personnel ==
- Erik Ravn – guitar, keyboards, bass, backing vocals
- Rune S. Brink – keyboards
- Henrik Flyman – guitar
- Morten Sørensen – drums
- Nils Patrik Johansson – vocals
