= Shadow Cabinet (disambiguation) =

A shadow cabinet is a senior group of opposition spokespeople in the Westminster system of government, also known as a shadow ministry.

Shadow Cabinet or shadow cabinet may also refer to:

- The Shadow Cabinet (album), a 2006 album by Wuthering Heights
- "Shadow Cabinet", a song on the album Remote Luxury by the Australian band The Church
- Shadow Cabinet (comics), a team of superheroes
- The Shadow Cabinet, a 2015 novel by Maureen Johnson
