= Civil War (band) =

Swedish power metal band

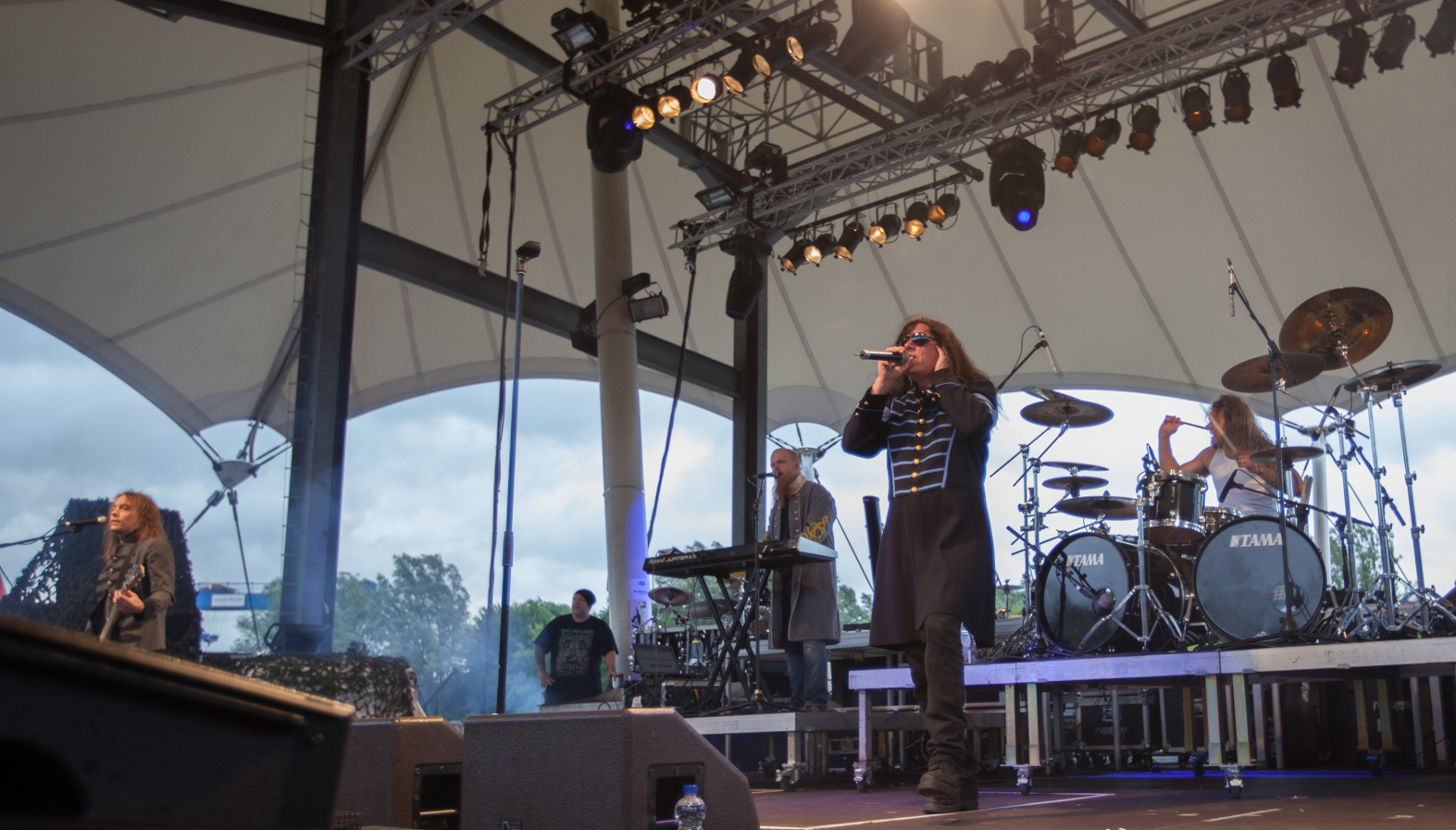
- Civil War performing in 2015

Background information
- Origin: Falun, Sweden
- Genres: Power metal, heavy metal
- Years active: 2012–present
- Labels: Despotz, Napalm
- Spinoff of: Sabaton
- Members: Daniel Mullback; Daniel Mÿhr; Petrus Granar; Thorbjörn (Thobbe) Englund
- Past members: Nils Patrik Johansson; Oskar Montelius; Stefan Eriksson; Rikard Sundén; Kelly Sundown Carpenter
- Website: www.civilwar.se

Civil War is a Swedish power metal band from Falun, formed in 2012 by several former members of Sabaton. The band adopted the same lyrical themes of war and historical battles that were characteristic of Sabaton. However, unlike Sabaton, many of Civil War's songs focus on American history and conflicts, whereas Sabaton's songs are primarily about European history and conflicts.

== History ==
=== Formation and The Killer Angels (2012–2014) ===
In April 2012, guitarists Rikard Sundén and Oskar Montelius, drummer Daniel Mullback, and keyboardist Daniel Mÿhr left the band Sabaton, of which they had been the founding members. They soon teamed up with Astral Doors vocalist Nils Patrik Johansson and soon bassist Stefan 'Pizza' Eriksson was recruited to form the band's lineup.

Initially signed to Despotz Records, the band released a self-titled EP in October 2012, and then immediately began working on their full-length debut album. The Killer Angels was released in June 2013, and reached Gold status in Sweden only two months later. At the same time, the band began playing live shows at various festivals in Sweden, and went on their first tour of Europe in February 2014. Guitarist Petrus Granar was added to the lineup as a seventh full-time member.

=== Gods and Generals (2015) ===
The band then signed a deal with Napalm Records and began working on their second studio album, titled Gods and Generals, which was released in May 2015. Shortly before the release of the first single from the album, Bay of Pigs, the band announced that Oskar Montelius and Stefan Eriksson had both left Civil War. Rather than search for replacements, the band decided to continue as a five-piece.

=== The Last Full Measure and new vocalist (2016–2018) ===
The band later released their third album, titled The Last Full Measure which was released in November 2016. Vocalist Nils Patrik Johansson departed the band a month later. The rest of the band members held open auditions for a new vocalist, finally settling on Kelly Sundown Carpenter, who was announced as the band's new vocalist on 9 February 2017.

=== Sabaton 20th-anniversary concert and Invaders (2019–present) ===
On 1 August 2019, Mullback, Mÿhr and Sundén rejoined Sabaton for the band's 20th-anniversary show at Wacken Open Air. For the show, the band headlined both main stages at the same time, with the current Sabaton lineup taking the "Faster" stage, while Mullback, Mÿhr, and Sundén taking the "Harder" stage with Thobbe Englund. On 2 August 2019, the band released the first song with Carpenter on vocals, "Dead Man's Glory". The single featured fellow ex-Sabaton guitarist, Thobbe Englund on lead guitar. They later announced on their website that they will soon start recording their fourth album.

On 12 March 2021, the band announced that Englund had replaced Sunden, who had been charged and convicted in a Swedish court of sexual abuse of an eight-year-old girl, as well as of possession of child pornography. Sundén, who changed his legal name to Johan Andersson, has separated from his wife, Sigrid.

On 24 May 2021, it was revealed in the band's Instagram page that Oskar Montelius would be making a guest appearance on backing vocals. This was Montelius' 1st recording with the band since leaving in 2015.

On 7 April 2022, the band's fourth studio album Invaders was announced to be released on 17 June, with the title track released as a single on the same day.

On 9 February 2024, it was announced that Thobbe Englund had rejoined Sabaton after guitarist Tommy Johansson announced he left the group. Englund posted on Civil War's Instagram page that he would still be active with the band, making him the only member to be in both Sabaton and Civil War.

On 2 April 2024, the band announced the departure of vocalist Kelly Sundown Carpenter. On 13 May 2026, it was announced on social media that Civil War would be announcing the identity of their new singer at Rocknytt Indoor festival in January 2027.

== Band members ==
Current

- Daniel Mullback — drums, backing vocals (2012–present)
- Daniel Mÿhr — keyboards, backing vocals (2012–present)
- Petrus Granar — guitars, backing vocals (2014–present), bass (2015–present)
- Thobbe Englund — guitars (2021–present)

Former

- Kelly Sundown Carpenter — lead vocals (2017–2024)
- Rikard Sundén — guitars, backing vocals (2012–2021)
- Nils Patrik Johansson — lead vocals (2012–2016)
- Oskar Montelius — guitars, backing vocals (2012–2015)
- Stefan 'Pizza' Eriksson — bass (2012–2015)

== Discography ==
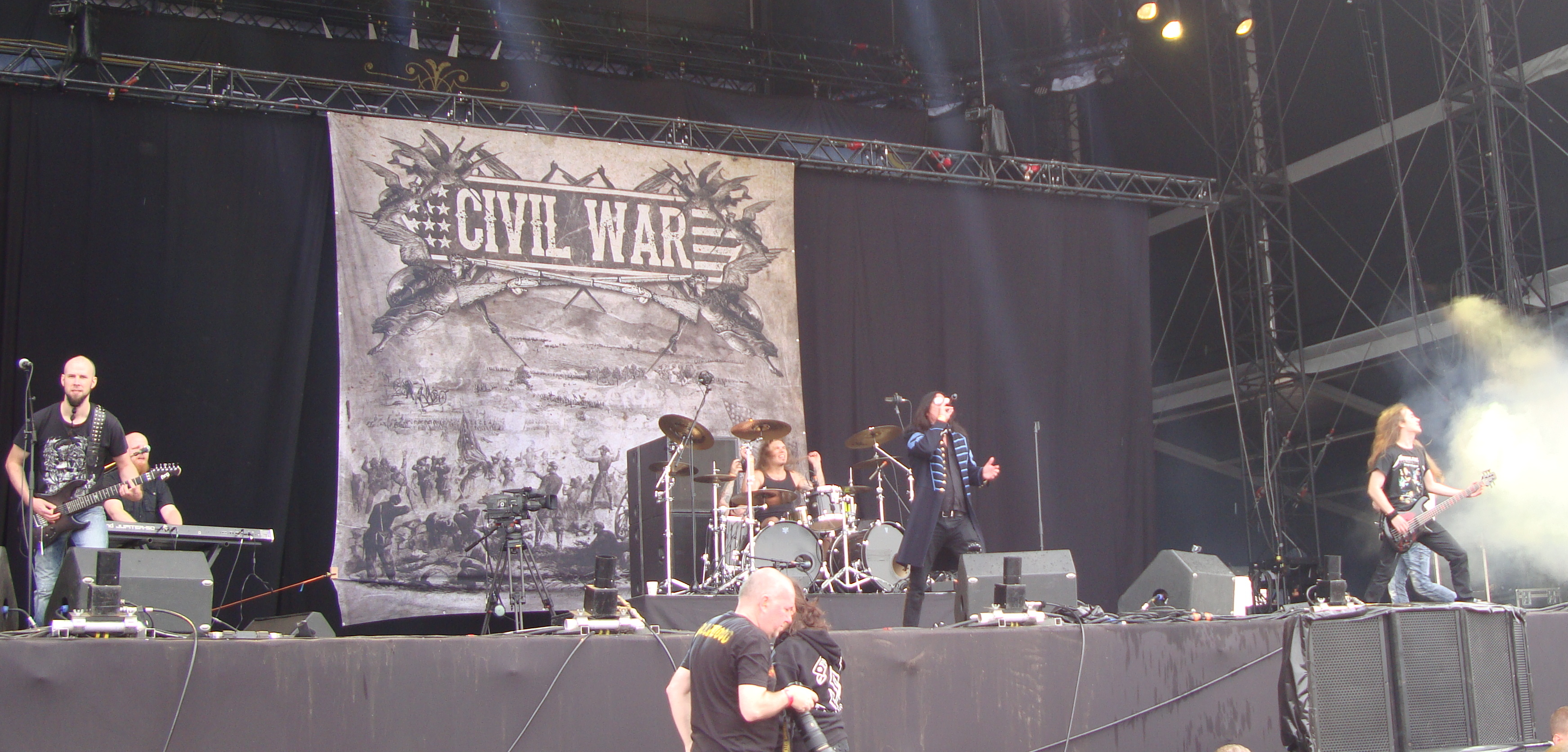
Civil War at Graspop Metal Meeting 2014

Extended plays

- 2012: Civil War (EP)

Studio albums

- 2013: The Killer Angels
- 2015: Gods and Generals
- 2016: The Last Full Measure
- 2022: Invaders
- 2027: TBA

Singles

- 2019: "Dead Man's Glory"
