= Salt (Wuthering Heights album) =

Studio album by Wuthering Heights
- Released: 5 January 2010
- Genre: Power metal, progressive metal, folk metal
- Length: 59:38
- Label: Sensory
- Producer: Tommy Hansen

Wuthering Heights chronology
The Shadow Cabinet (2006)	Salt (2010)

Professional ratings
Review scores
Source	Rating
AllMusic	3.5/5 stars

Salt is the fifth full-length album by Danish heavy metal band Wuthering Heights. The album takes themes that involve the sea, and other myths and tales from the sailor's culture.

As usual in Wuthering Height's albums, the mixture between genres like power metal, progressive metal and folk metal can be noticed clearly. In this specific album, it can be noticed a heavier but still melodic sound.

== Track listing ==
All songs written by Erik Ravn.

1. Away! - 01:27
2. The Desperate Poet - 06:28
3. The Mad Sailor - 06:19
4. The Last Tribe (Mother Earth) – 07:54
5. Tears - 05:55
6. Weather the Storm - 06:53
7. The Field - 05:58
8. Water of Life - 02:06
9. Lost at Sea - 16:38

== Personnel ==
- Erik Ravn – guitar, keyboards, vocals
- Andreas Lindahl – keyboards
- Martin Arendal – guitar
- Morten Sørensen – drums
- Nils Patrik Johansson – vocals
- Teddy Möller – bass
