= Lion's Share (band) =

Swedish heavy metal band

Lion's Share are a heavy metal band, formed in Sundsvall, Sweden in 1987 and later relocated to Stockholm, by guitarist Lars Chriss, and keyboardist Kay Backlund. The band has since experienced multiple line-up changes, with Lars Chriss the only constant presence in the band through the years. Some of the past members are now or have been featured in bands such as King Diamond, HammerFall, Treat, Sorcerer, Therion, Glenn Hughes, The Poodles, and 220 Volt.

== Members ==
Current members

- Lars Chriss – guitars
- Nils Patrik Johansson – vocals

Former members

- Anders Engberg – vocals
- Andy Loos – bass
- Kay Backlund – keyboard
- Pontus Egberg – bass
- Johan Koleberg – drums
- Tony Niva – vocals
- Sampo Axelsson – bass
- Magnus Ulfstedt – drums (live only)

== Discography ==
=== Studio albums ===
- Lion's Share (1995)
- Two (1997)
- Fall from Grace (1999)
- Entrance (2001)
- Emotional Coma (2007)
- Dark Hours (2009)
- Inferno (2026)

=== Singles ===
- Ghost Town Queen (1988)
- Flash in the Night (1997)
- Sins of a Father (re-recording) (2018)
- We Are What We Are (2019)
- Aim Higher (2020)
- Killed by Death (Motörhead cover) (2020)
- Shotgun Messiah (re-recording) (2020)
- Under Attack (2021)
- Youphoria (2021)
- Knock on Wood (Amy Stewart cover) (2021)
- City of the Night (2022)
- Infernal Soul (2022)
- Throne of Steel (2022)
- United (2023)
- Life on Mars (David Bowie cover) (2024)

=== Demos ===
- Demo 1988 (1988)
- Demo 1990 (1990)
- Demo 1991 (1991)
- Sins of a Father (1995)

=== Live and official tribute albums ===
- Magic Circle Festival Vol.1 Manowar DVD - Lion’s Share 2 songs live (2008)
- A tribute to Judas Priest legends of metal - Lion's Share "A Touch of Evil" Century Media (1996)
