= Wuthering Heights (band) =

Danish heavy metal band

- Also known as: Angelica (1989–1992); Minas Tirith (1992–1995); Vergelmir (1995–1997)
- Origin: Copenhagen, Denmark
- Genres: Power metal; progressive metal; folk metal
- Years active: 1989–present (hiatus since 2011)
- Labels: Locomotive, Sensory, Scarlet
- Members: Erik Ravn; Morten Gade Sørensen; Nils Patrik Johansson; Teddy Möller; Andreas Lindhal; Martin Arendal
- Past members: See below
- Website: wuthering-heights.dk

Wuthering Heights is a Danish-Swedish heavy metal band formed in 1989. Their musical style falls in somewhere between progressive metal, folk metal and power metal.

== History ==
The group formed in 1989 under the name Angelica. They recorded nothing under this name, changing the name to Minas Tirith for the release of a demo cassette, entitled Tales From the Woods in late 1992. By the release of their second demo in 1995 the band had changed their name to Vergelmir. One track from this demo was included in 1996 on the Danish sampler Extremity Rising Vol.2 (on the Serious Entertainment label).

In 1997, the band recorded their first album for German label Prophecy Productions, but the deal fell through and this version of the album has never been officially released. The band re-recorded the entire album in 1998 for their new American label The Laser’s Edge/Sensory and as the debut album Within it was finally released in 1999. The band began a long-lasting relationship with producer Tommy Hansen and his Jailhouse Studios for their follow-up album To Travel for Evermore in 2002. The band discovered then-unknown singer Nils Patrik Johansson whose huge voice (somewhat reminiscent of Ronnie James Dio) boosted the band’s sound, and they released Far from the Madding Crowd in 2004, which has received some critical acclaim amid the underground power metal and folk metal communities.

In the summer of 2004 the band played outside Europe for the first time. The gig took place at the ProgPower festival in Atlanta, Georgia. The show was filmed and was supposed to feature as a bonus DVD on the fourth album, but it was later changed to a bonus audio recording on their fourth release The Shadow Cabinet from 2006. Their band released their fifth studio album, Salt, in 2010.

The band's line-up has changed a great deal over the years, and Erik Ravn is the only founding member remaining in the group today. They are currently signed to independent Danish label Nagelfest Music. However, the band has been on hold since March 2011 due to Erik Ravn's serious back-pain problems.

In November 2018, Erik Ravn announced he was working on a new project called Beltane Born. He describes the music as celtic hard rock, but advises that the music is still in the demo stage and may not have found its final style yet. Also, it is uncertain who exactly is going to participate in the project.

== Band members ==
=== Current members ===
- Erik Ravn – guitar, bass, keyboards, vocals (1989–present)
- Morten Gade Sørensen – drums, percussion (2002–present)
- Nils Patrik Johansson – vocals (2003–present)
- Teddy Möller – bass, vocals (2004–present)
- Andreas Lindhal – keyboards (2004–present)
- Martin Arendal – guitar (2004–present)

=== Former members ===
- John Sønder – guitar (1989–1990)
- Morten Birch – bass (1989–1994)
- Kenneth Saandvig – drums (1990–1998)
- Martin Røpcke – guitar (1991–1992)
- Jannik B. Larsen – guitar (1992–1994)
- Troels Liebgott – vocals (1993–1996)
- Tim Christensen – keyboards (1993–1996)
- Tim Mogensen – bass (1994–1995)
- Louise – violin (1994–1995)
- Rune S. Brink – keyboards (1996–2004)
- Morten Nødgaard – vocals (1996–1997), drums (1998–2000)
- Kasper Gram – bass (1996–2000)
- Kristian Andrén – vocals (1998–2002)
- Peter Jensen – guitar (1999)
- Henrik Flyman – guitar (2002–2004)

== Discography ==
Studio albums

- 1999: Within
- 2002: To Travel for Evermore
- 2004: Far from the Madding Crowd
- 2006: The Shadow Cabinet
- 2010: Salt

Demos

- 1997: Within
