= Sky Cabin =

Ride at Knott's Berry Farm

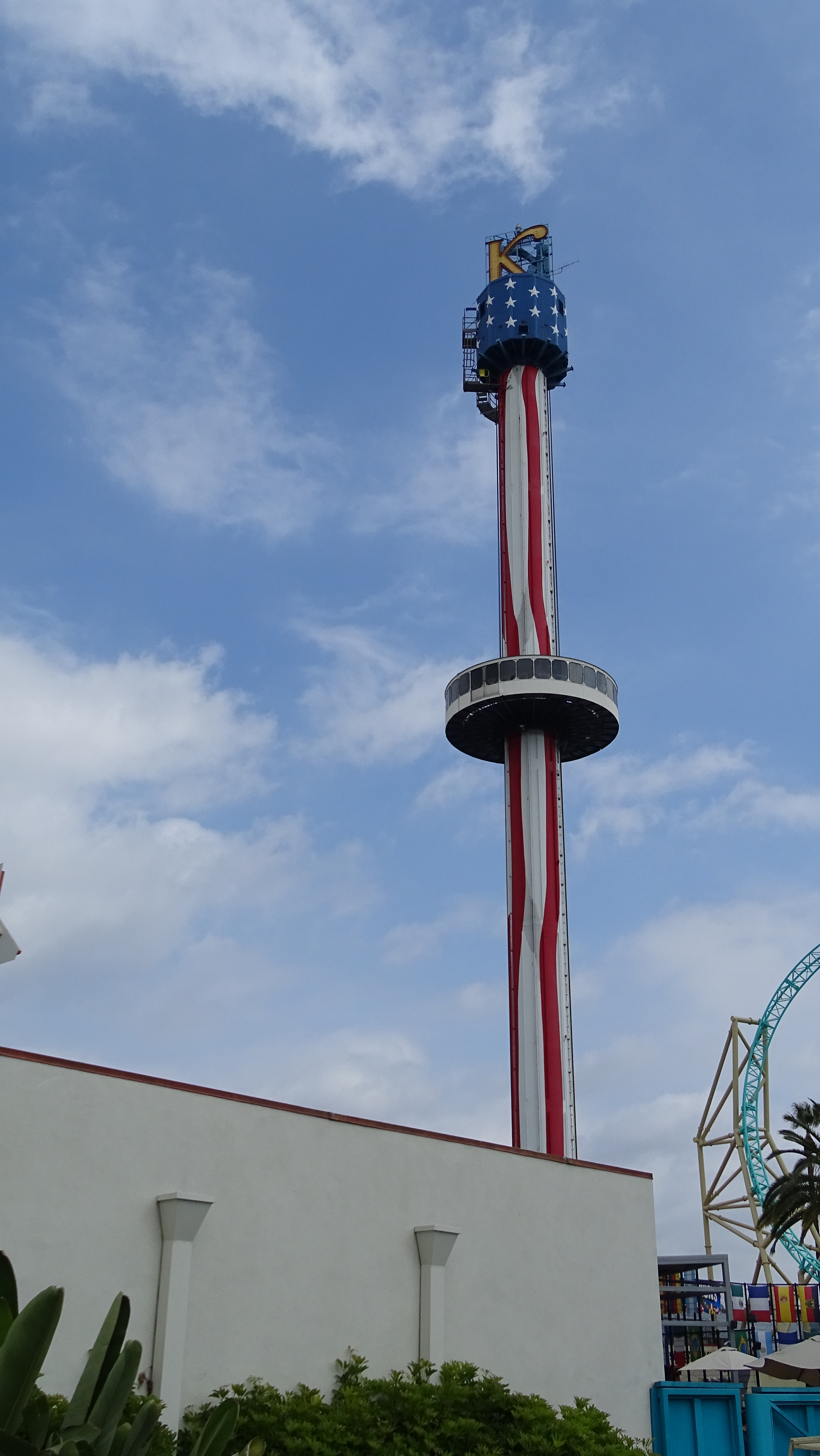
- View of Sky Cabin in April 2018

Knott's Berry Farm
- Area: The Boardwalk
- Status: Operating
- Opening date: 1976
- Closing date: 1999 (Sky Jump)

Ride statistics
- Attraction type: Gyro Tower
- Manufacturer: Intamin
- Model: Parachute Gyro 1200
- Height: 180 ft (55 m)
- Vehicles: 1
- Riders per vehicle: Cabin holds approximately 35-55 guests
- Duration: Around 4 mins
- Height restriction: 46 in (117 cm)
- Wheelchair accessible
- Must transfer from wheelchair

Sky Cabin is a 180-foot-tall gyro tower designed by Intamin, located at Knott's Berry Farm in Buena Park, California, USA. It is a slowly revolving viewing cabin, offering a panoramic view of Knott's Berry Farm and the surrounding land outside the park. On a clear day, Downtown Los Angeles can be viewed directly from the tower. The skyline of Disneyland and Disney California Adventure can also be viewed. Before the announcement of the park's former Windseeker ride, Sky Cabin was a possible location to become replaced by Windseeker. Windseeker ended up opening in Fiesta Village and was later relocated to Worlds of Fun. It is one of the many existing attractions at the park operating before Cedar Fair took ownership of the park. It opened to the general public in 1976 as part of the former roaring 20's expansion area.

== History ==
Sky Cabin opened in 1976 as part of the former Roaring 20s area. Originally, the ride was once the tallest structure in all of Orange County. On December 30, 2016, Sky Cabin was involved in an incident. Sky Cabin became stuck mid way causing riders to become stranded in the air for 8 hours. After being closed for over a year and undergoing months of a detailed inspection, review and minor operating adjustments to the ride, Sky Cabin reopened Feb 10, 2018. The ride received a new ride control system along with a hidden emergency toilet, new speakers, new air conditioning and window covers. The tower is topped by a giant neon-lit "K" sign with an incandescent aircraft warning light, in the style of Knott's Berry Farm's logotype. The original 1970s-era neon sign was replaced with an identical LED sign in June 2020, during the park's extended closure due to the COVID-19 pandemic.

Originally painted in a red and white checkerboard scheme, the tower received a new paint-job in 1997 with a combination of aqua blue, red, blue, yellow and green. The tower was repainted once again with an American Flag paint scheme in 2002.

== Sky Jump ==
Originally sharing its space with the Sky Cabin's opening in 1976, Sky Jump was a Parachute drop ride combined with the Sky Cabin that operated from 1976 to 1999. This dual/combo attraction combined the Intamin Gyro 1200 model and the Intamin Parachute 1200 models onto a single tower. Sky Jump riders were given 12 individual stand-up cages equipped with parachutes each that would ascend up, and drop 150 feet below.

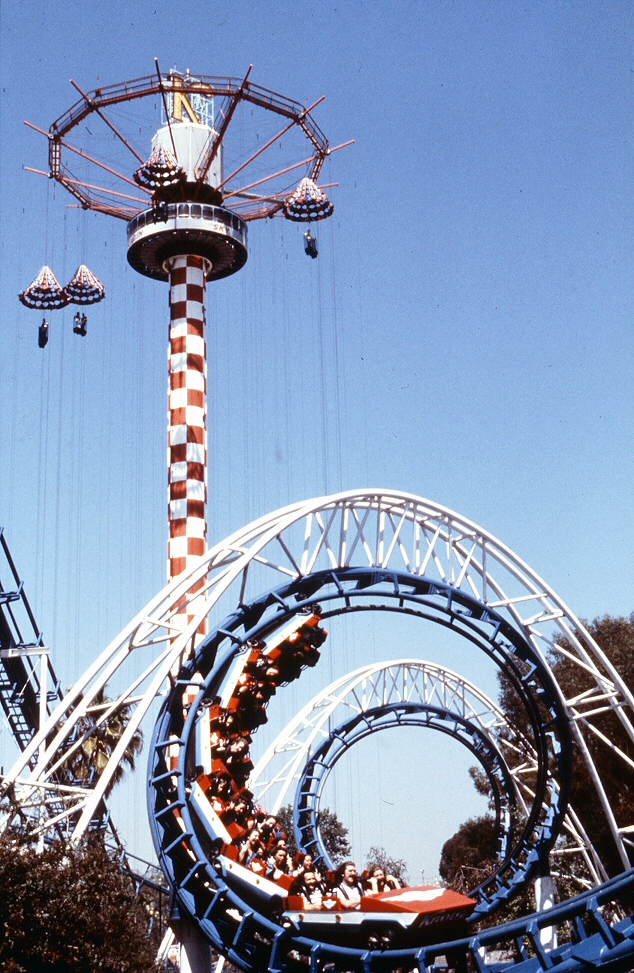
Sky Cabin/Sky Jump in operation circa 1980 with its original red/white checkerboard paint scheme.

Sky Cabin riders were also able to ascend up in the slow-viewing cabin while also witnessing the Sky Jump parachutes ascending and dropping 150 feet in the air.

Sky Jump closed in 1999, and the parachute support structure was removed from the tower in spring 2002.

== Incidents ==
On October 30, 1983, an 18-year-old young man jumped to his death from the Sky Jump attraction. The death was ruled a suicide.

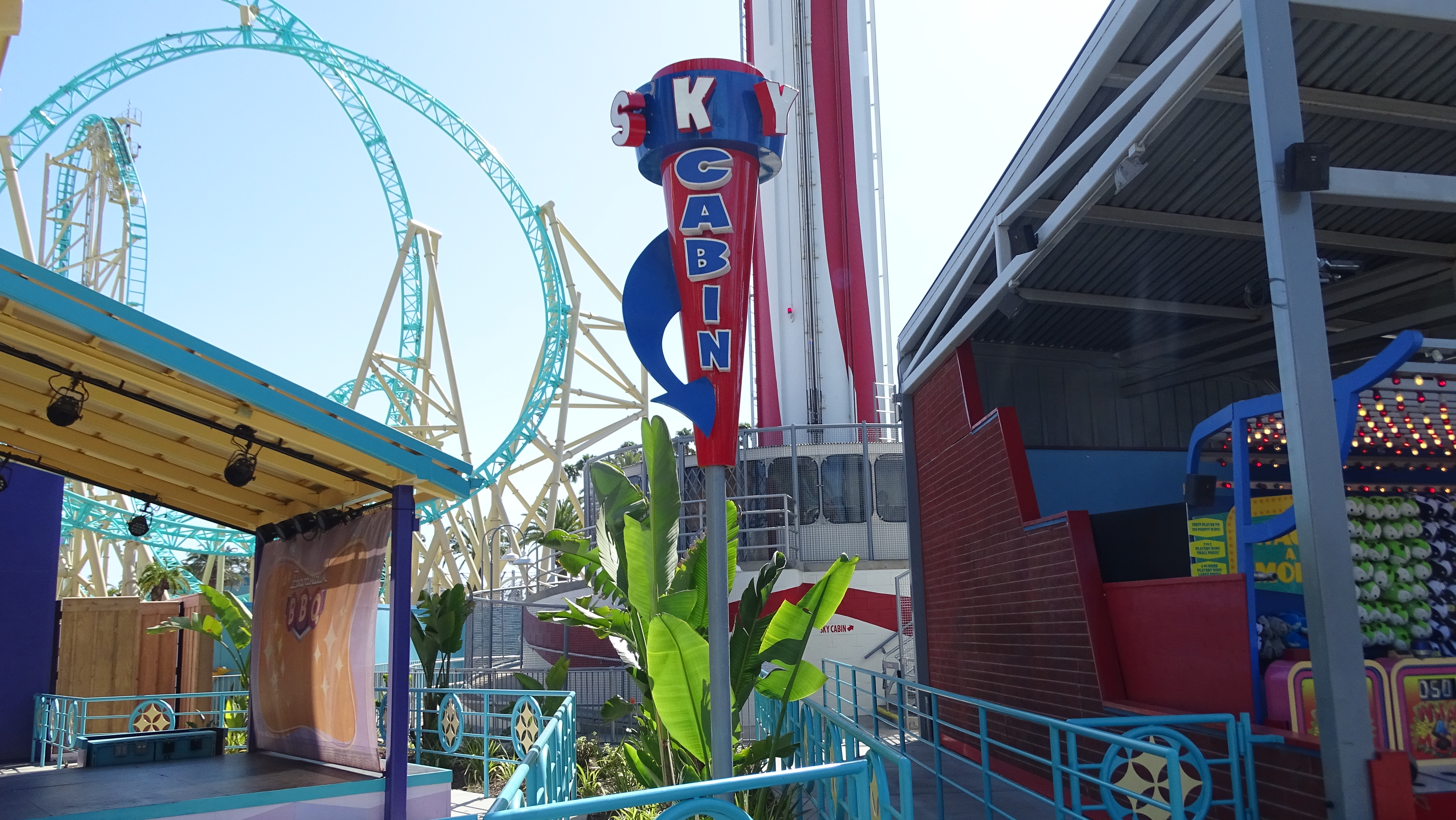
Sky Cabin's entrance is located next to the Boardwalk BBQ.

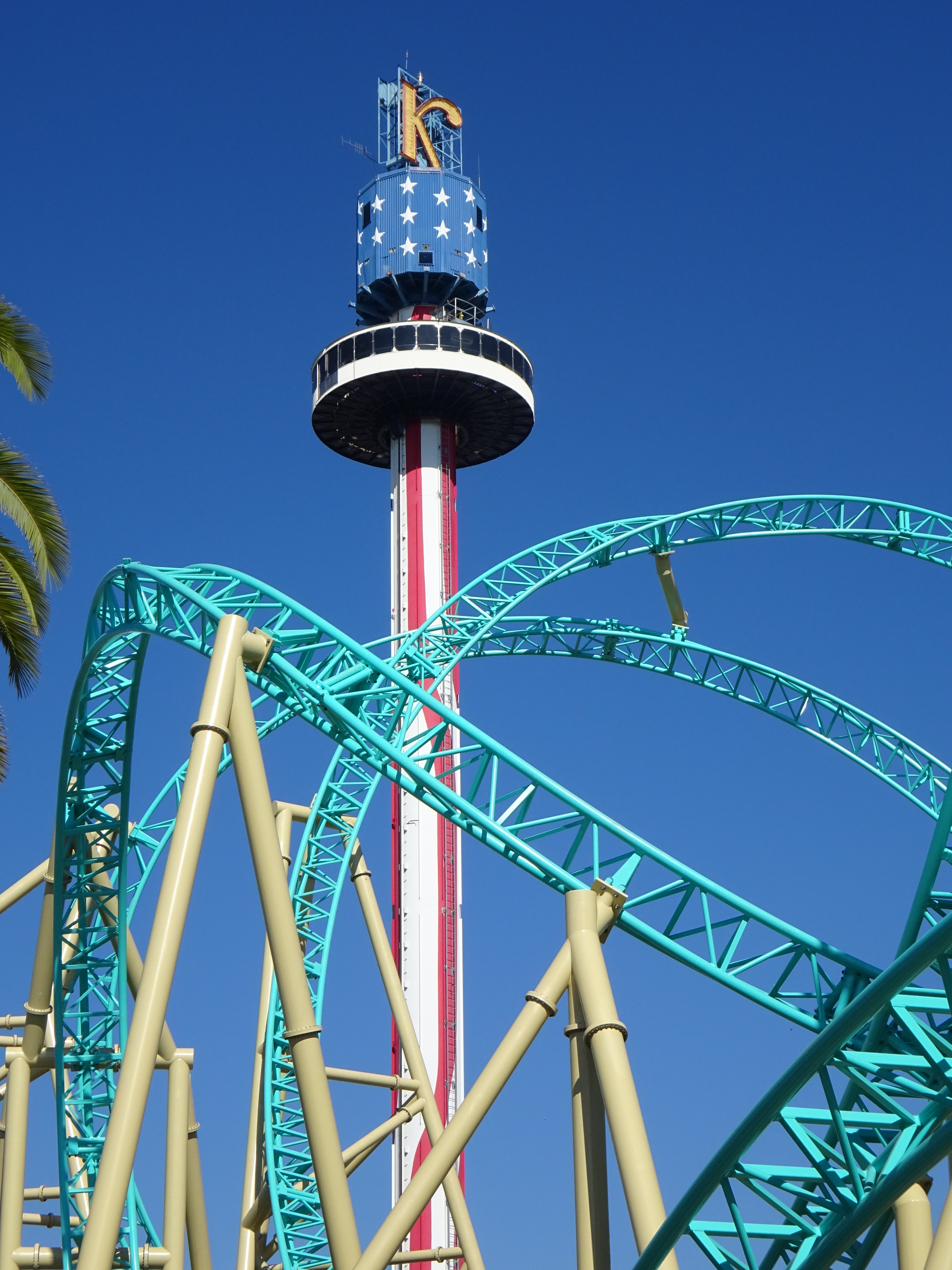
Sky Cabin's Tower

== Photo gallery ==
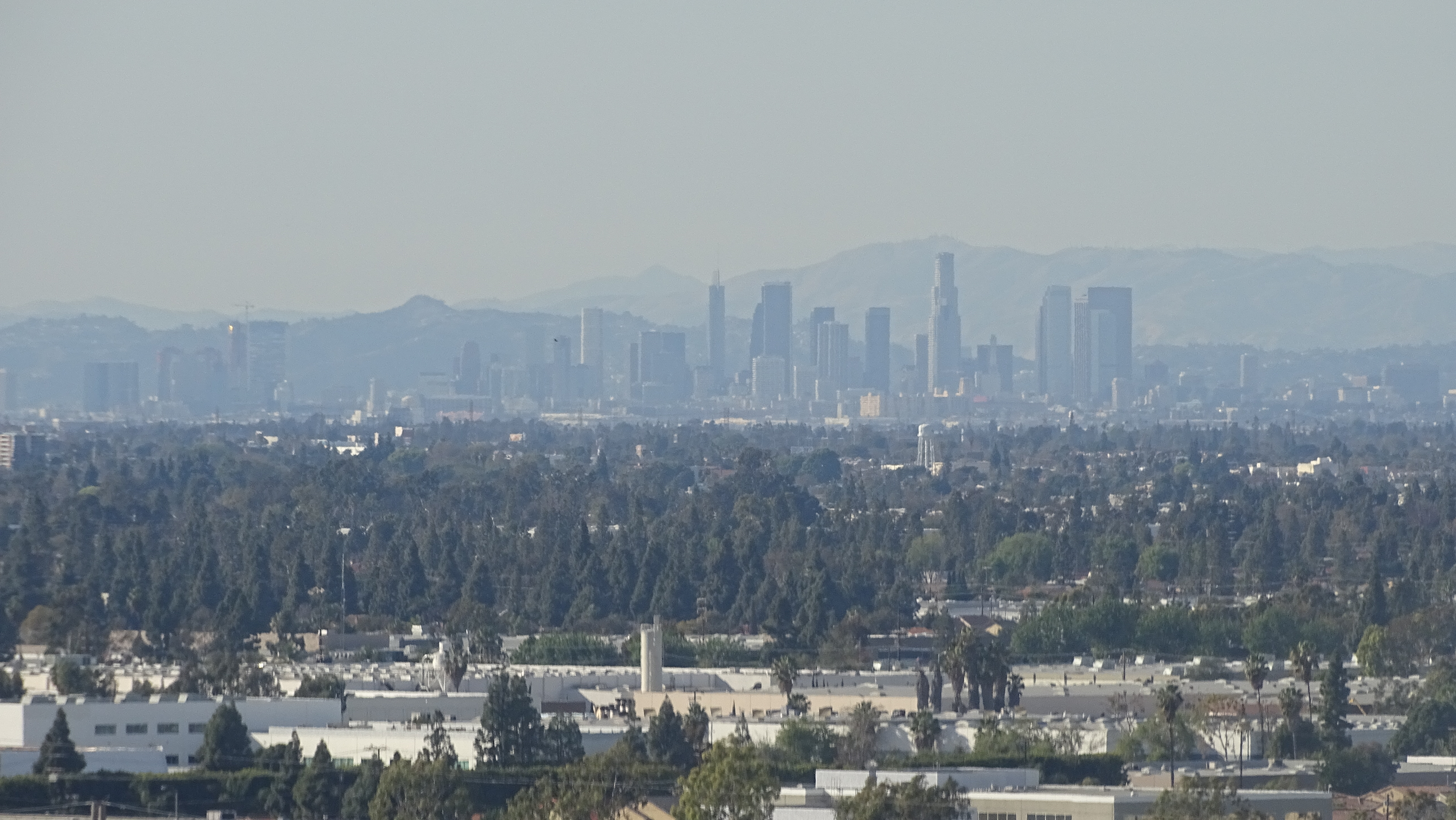
Downtown Los Angeles as viewed from the Sky Cabin.

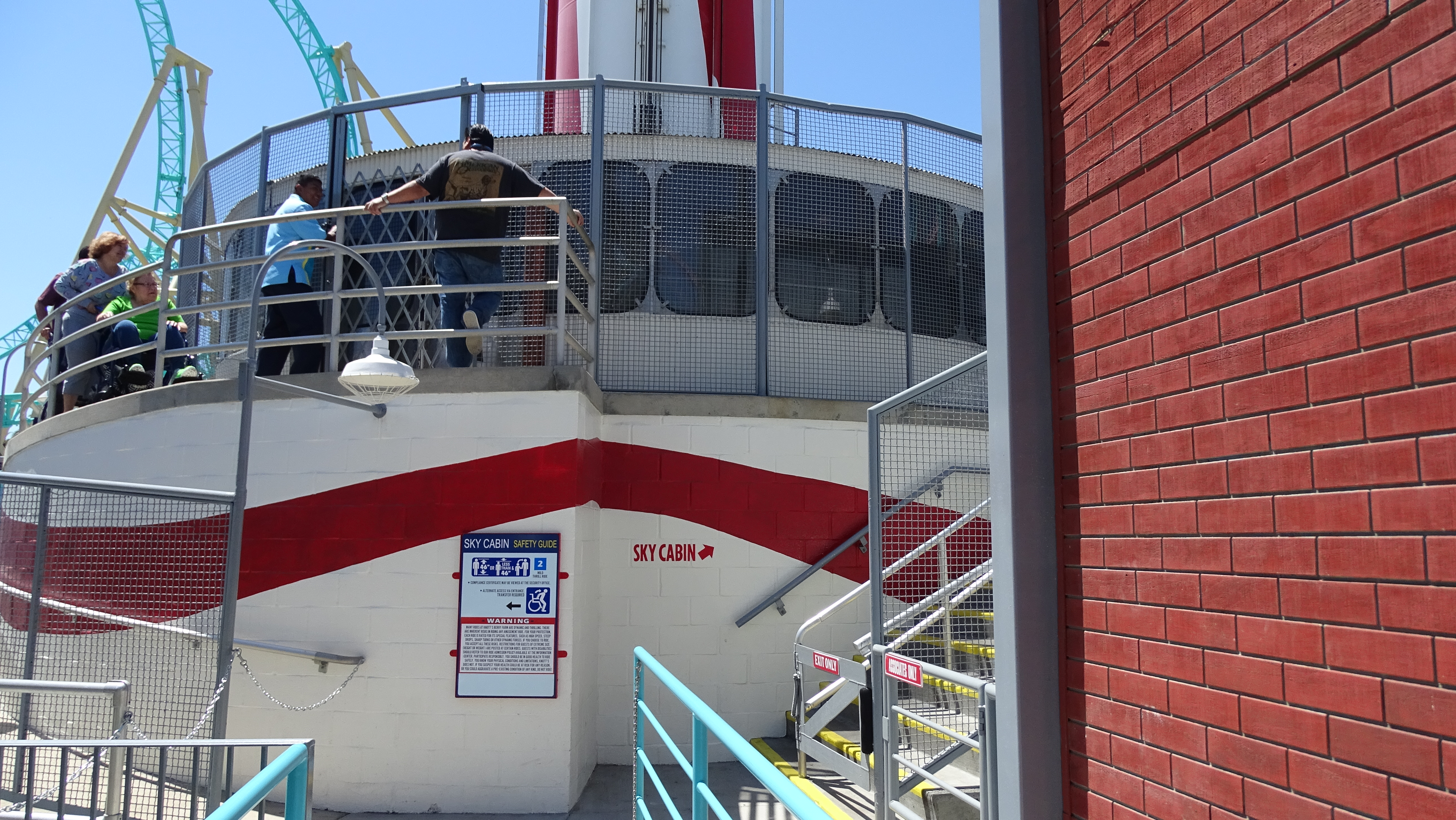
Sky Cabin's walkway entrance. ADA and wheelchair access entrance is located to the left side.

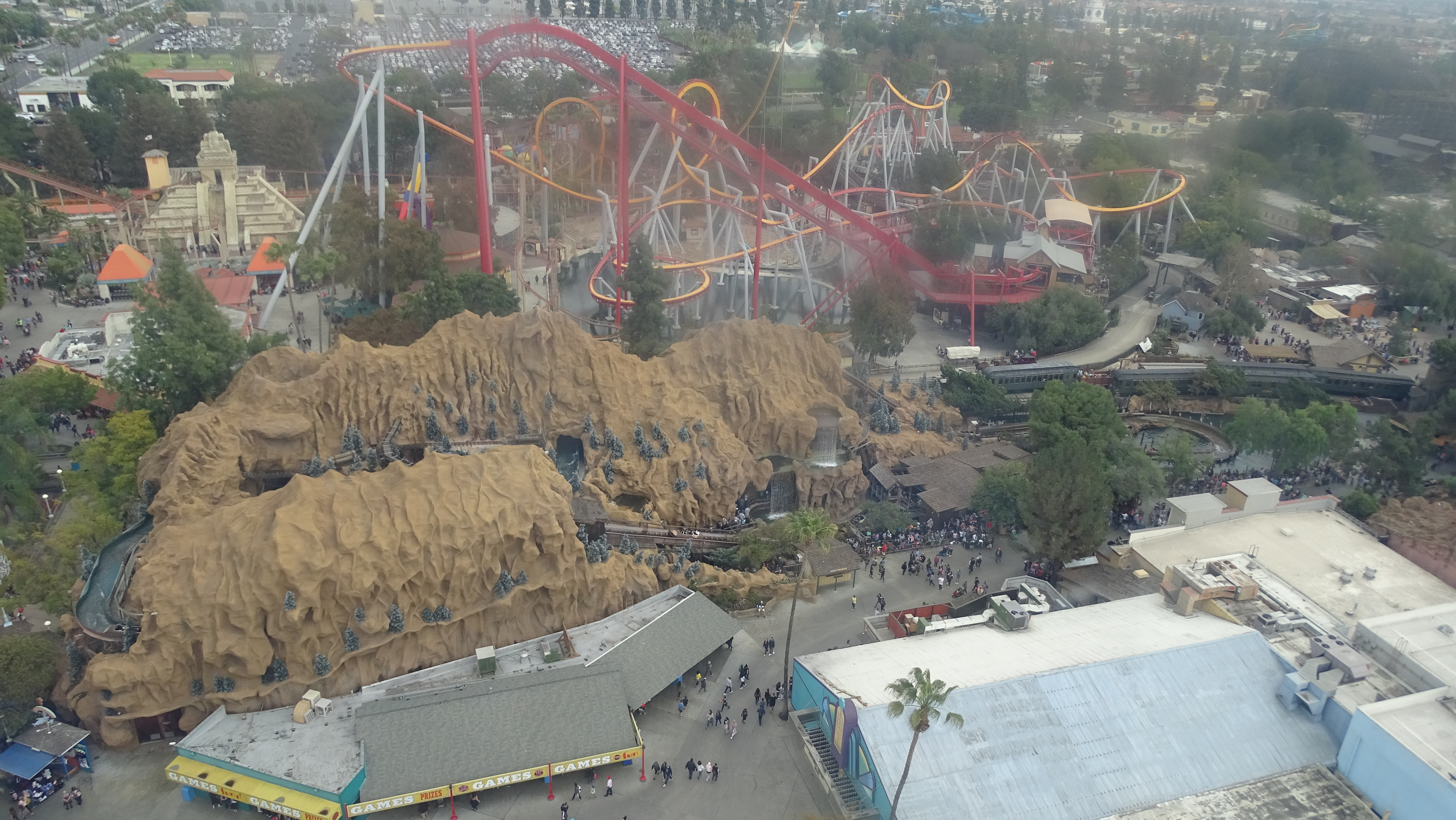
Timber Mountain Log Ride, Montezooma's Revenge, and Silver Bullet as viewed from the Sky Cabin.

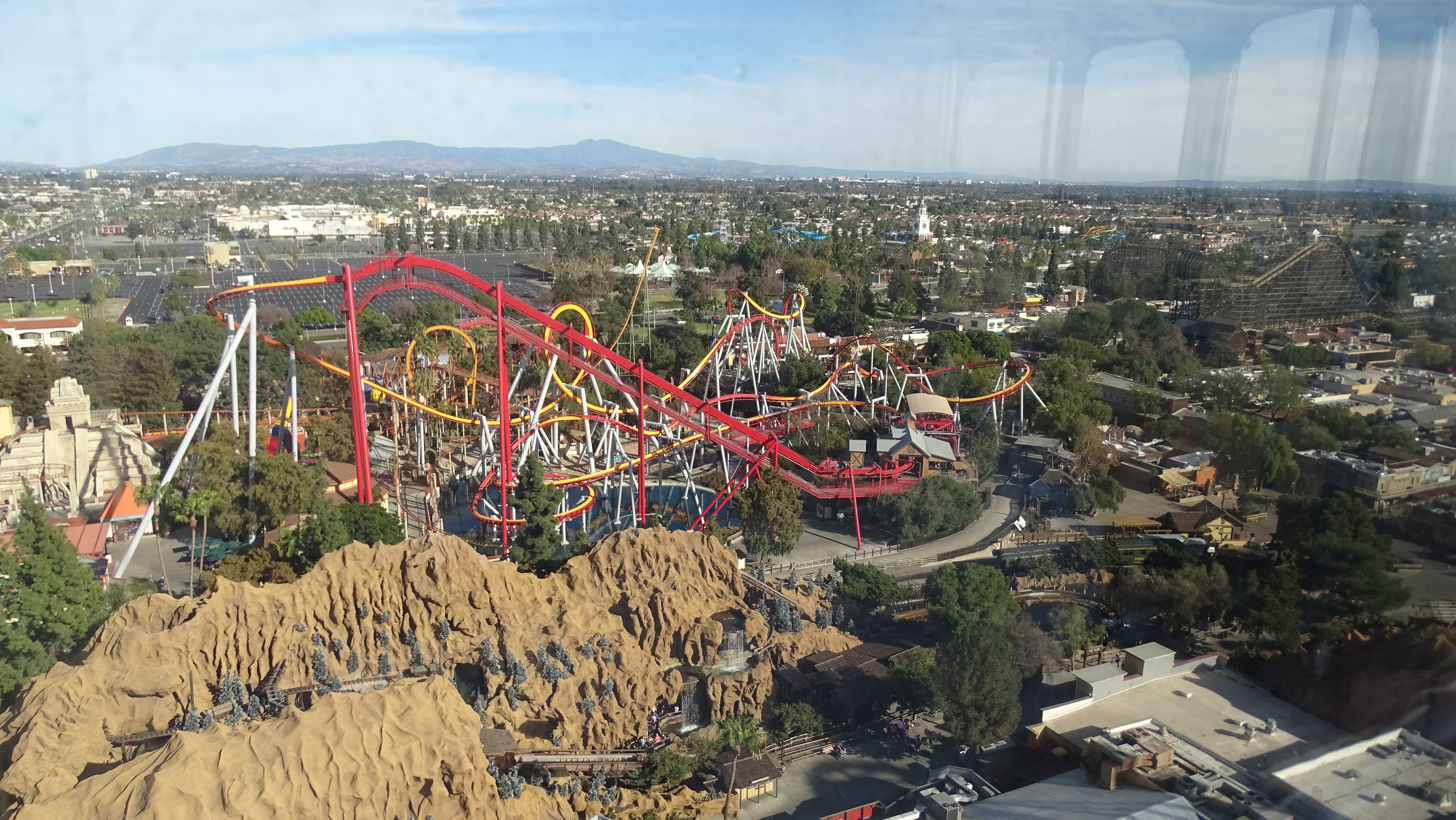
Viewing the east lot from Sky Cabin.

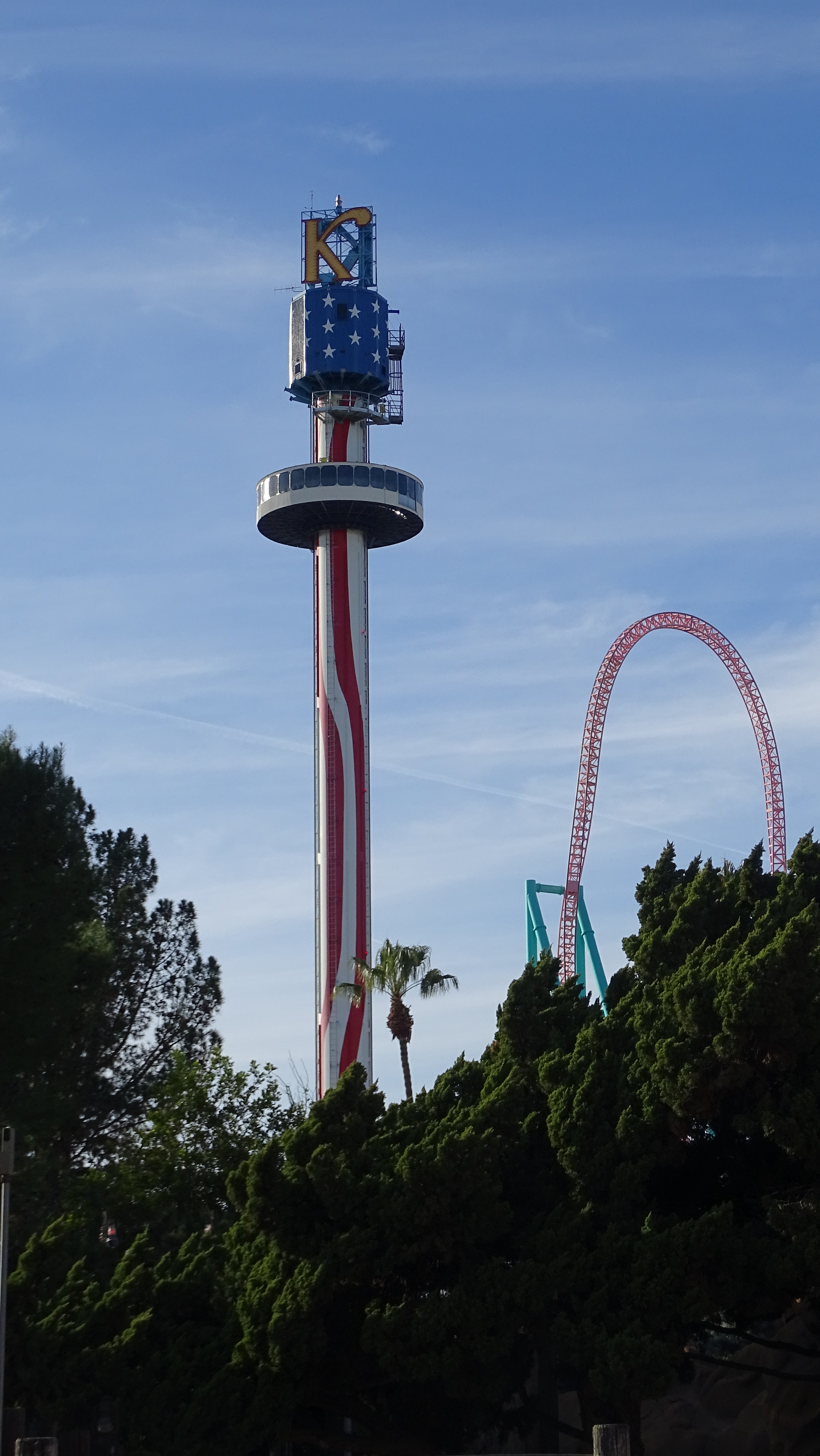
Sky Cabin and Xcelerator.

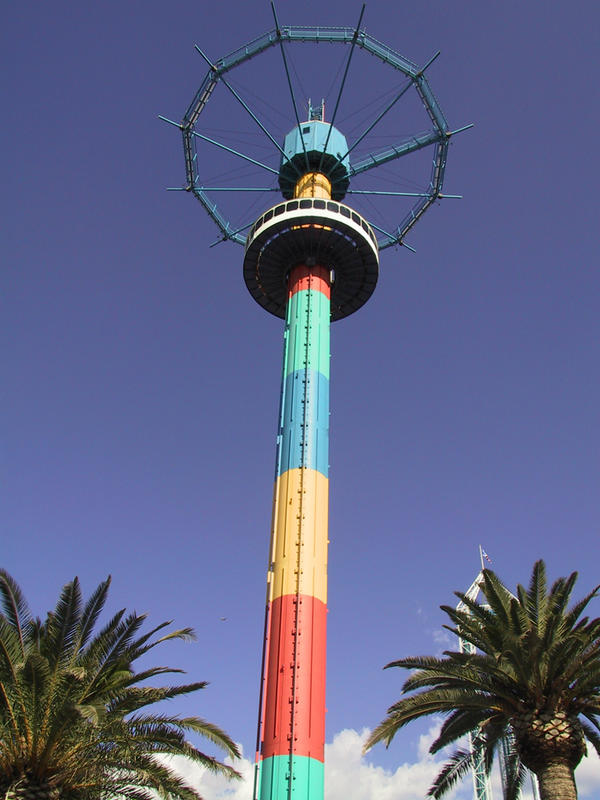
Sky Cabin when it still had Sky Jump combined with the tower, before it was removed.
