= The Last Full Measure (album) =

Studio album by Civil War
- Released: November 4, 2016
- Recorded: 2015
- Genre: Power metal, Heavy metal
- Length: 56:09
- Label: Napalm Records
- Producer: Civil War

Civil War chronology
| Gods and Generals (2015) | The Last Full Measure (2016) | Invaders (2022) |

Singles from The Last Full Measure
- 1. "Road to Victory" Released: September 30, 2016; 2. "Tombstone" Released: November 2, 2016

The Last Full Measure is the third studio album by Swedish power metal band Civil War, released in 2016.

== Track list ==
| No. | Title | Length |
|---|---|---|
| 1. | "Road to Victory" | 4:44 |
| 2. | "Deliverance" | 5:26 |
| 3. | "Savannah" | 4:10 |
| 4. | "Tombstone" | 3:15 |
| 5. | "America" | 5:26 |
| 6. | "A Tale That Never Should Be Told" | 6:06 |
| 7. | "Gangs of New York" | 4:07 |
| 8. | "Gladiator" | 3:22 |
| 9. | "People of the Abyss" | 4:07 |
| 10. | "The Last Full Measure" | 6:27 |
| 11. | "Strike Hard Strike Sure" | 3:57 |
| 12. | "Aftermath" | 5:02 |
| Total length: | | 56:09 |

== Personnel ==
- Nils Patrik Johansson – vocals
- Rikard Sundén – guitar
- Petrus Granar – guitar
- Daniel Mÿhr – keyboards
- Daniel Mullback – drums

== Charts ==
| Chart (2016) | Peak position |
|---|---|
| Belgian Albums (Ultratop Flanders) | 162 |
| Belgian Albums (Ultratop Wallonia) | 147 |
| German Albums (Offizielle Top 100) | 95 |
| Swedish Albums (Sverigetopplistan) | 47 |
