= Nils Patrik Johansson =

Swedish heavy metal singer

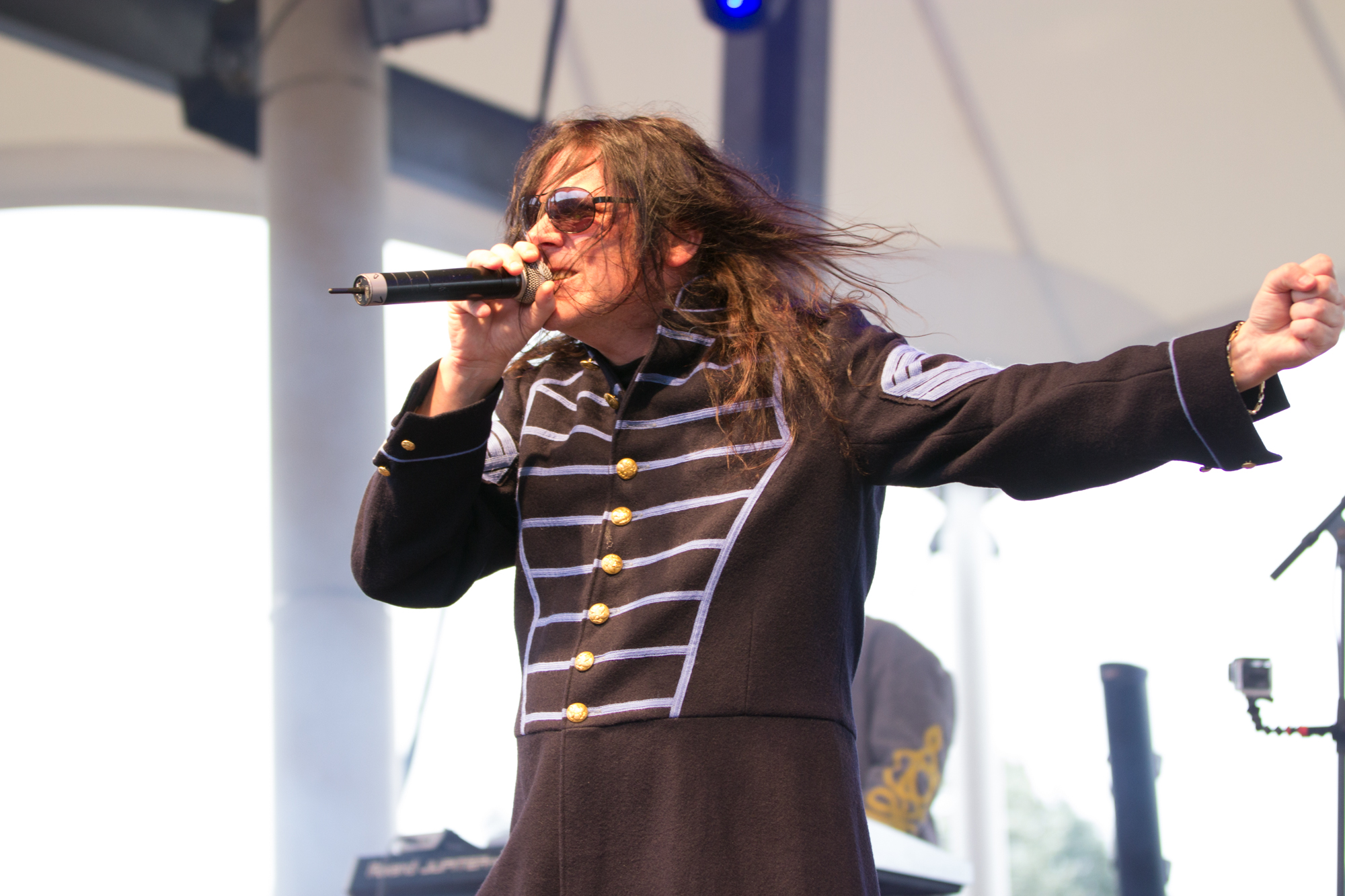
- Johansson in 2015

Background information
- Born: 14 October 1967 (age 57); Borlänge, Sweden
- Genres: Power metal, heavy metal
- Occupation: Singer
- Years active: 2002–present
- Member of: Astral Doors, Lion's Share, Wuthering Heights
- Formerly of: Civil War

Nils Patrik Johansson (born 14 October 1967) is a Swedish heavy metal singer who has been the lead singer of Astral Doors since 2002 and was the lead vocalist of Civil War from 2012 to 2016. He is also a member of the bands Lion's Share and Wuthering Heights, as well as an eponymous solo project, Nils Patrik Johansson.

== Biography ==
Born in Borlänge, Johansson began his career in music as a drummer in the 1980s, but soon realized he wanted to sing instead. In 2003, Johansson founded Astral Doors with Joachim Nordlund and Johan Lindstedt. He writes lyrics and vocal melodies for the band. He has been the lead vocalist of Lion's Share since 2003, and joined Wuthering Heights the same year. When guitarists Rikard Sundén and Oskar Montelius, as well as drummer Daniel Mullback and keyboardist Daniel Mÿhr separated from Sabaton in 2012, Johansson contacted them to found Civil War with Stefan "Pizza" Eriksson playing bass. Johansson came up with the name for the band, and also wrote all of the lyrics and most of the music. In 2016, Johansson left the group, citing a desire to spend more time with his family.

Johansson is married. His son, Nils Fredrik Johansson, plays drums in a band called Tuck from Hell. He also played drums on Johansson's solo album, Evil Deluxe, released in 2018. He also has a daughter, as well as a grandson from his son. His voice has often been compared to that of Ronnie James Dio or Rod Stewart.
