= Bay of Neustadt =

Bay in the Baltic Sea

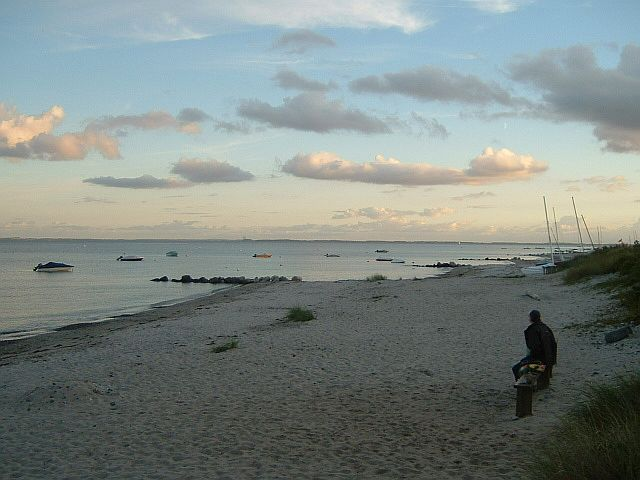
Dusk over the bay

The Bay of Neustadt or Neustadt Bay (German: Neustädter Bucht) is a sub-bay within the Bay of Lübeck which, in turn, is part of the Bay of Mecklenburg in the Baltic Sea.

The only harbour on the Bay of Neustadt, which can be defined by an imaginary line between Sierksdorf and Pelzerhaken off the coast of Wagria, is Neustadt in Holstein. In 1843 the Pelzerhaken Lighthouse was built by the Danes as a navigation aid in the Bay of Neustadt. It was rebuilt in 1936 and is still in operation.

The Bay of Neustadt achieved tragic fame in 1945 when a ship carrying concentration camp inmates, the SS Cap Arcona, sank when the Royal Air Force bombed her, killing about 5,000 people. This was one of the greatest disasters at sea and one of the largest single-incident maritime loss of life in the Second World War. In Neustadt there is a Cap Arcona Museum.

Since January 2007 a speed limit has been introduced for pleasure boats in order to improve the safety of swimmers and sailors. According to the regulation issued by the Waterways and Shipping Navigation Division North (Wasser- und Schifffahrtsdirektion Nord), the speed of motor boats and water scooters may not exceed 15 km/h within a 2-kilometre-wide strip along the coast from Travemünde to Neustadt.

Since May 2012 there has also been a specific ban on certain craft using the Bay of Neustadt. It stipulates a noise limit on motor boats and jet skis.
