= The Shadow Cabinet (album) =

Studio album by Wuthering Heights
- Released: October 13, 2006
- Recorded: 2006
- Genre: Progressive metal, folk metal, power metal, symphonic metal
- Length: 55:36
- Label: Sensory
- Producer: Tommy Hansen

Wuthering Heights chronology
Far from the Madding Crowd (2004)	The Shadow Cabinet (2006)	Salt (2010)

Professional ratings
Review scores
Source	Rating
Allmusic	3.5/5 stars
Hard Rock Magazine	10/10
Metal Storm	9/10

The Shadow Cabinet is the fourth full-length album by Danish band Wuthering Heights. It has been received with great reviews, and is considered "the best symphonic metal record of 2006".

== Track listing ==
All songs written by Erik Ravn.

1. Demon Desire - 05:18
2. Beautifool - 05:02
3. The Raven - 04:47
4. Apathy Divine (Part 1: Faith) - 08:19
5. Envy - 06:41
6. Apathy Divine (Part 2: Snow) - 05:55
7. Sleep - 04:45
8. I Shall Not Yield - 06:40
9. Reason...? - 00:31
10. Carpe Noctem - Seize the Night - 07:38

== Personnel ==
- Erik Ravn – guitar, keyboards, vocals
- Andreas Lindahl – keyboards
- Martin Arendal – guitar
- Morten Sørensen – drums
- Nils Patrik Johansson – vocals
- Teddy Möller - bass
