= Taming Sari Tower =

Gyro tower in Malacca City, Malacca, Malaysia

- Menara Taming Sari
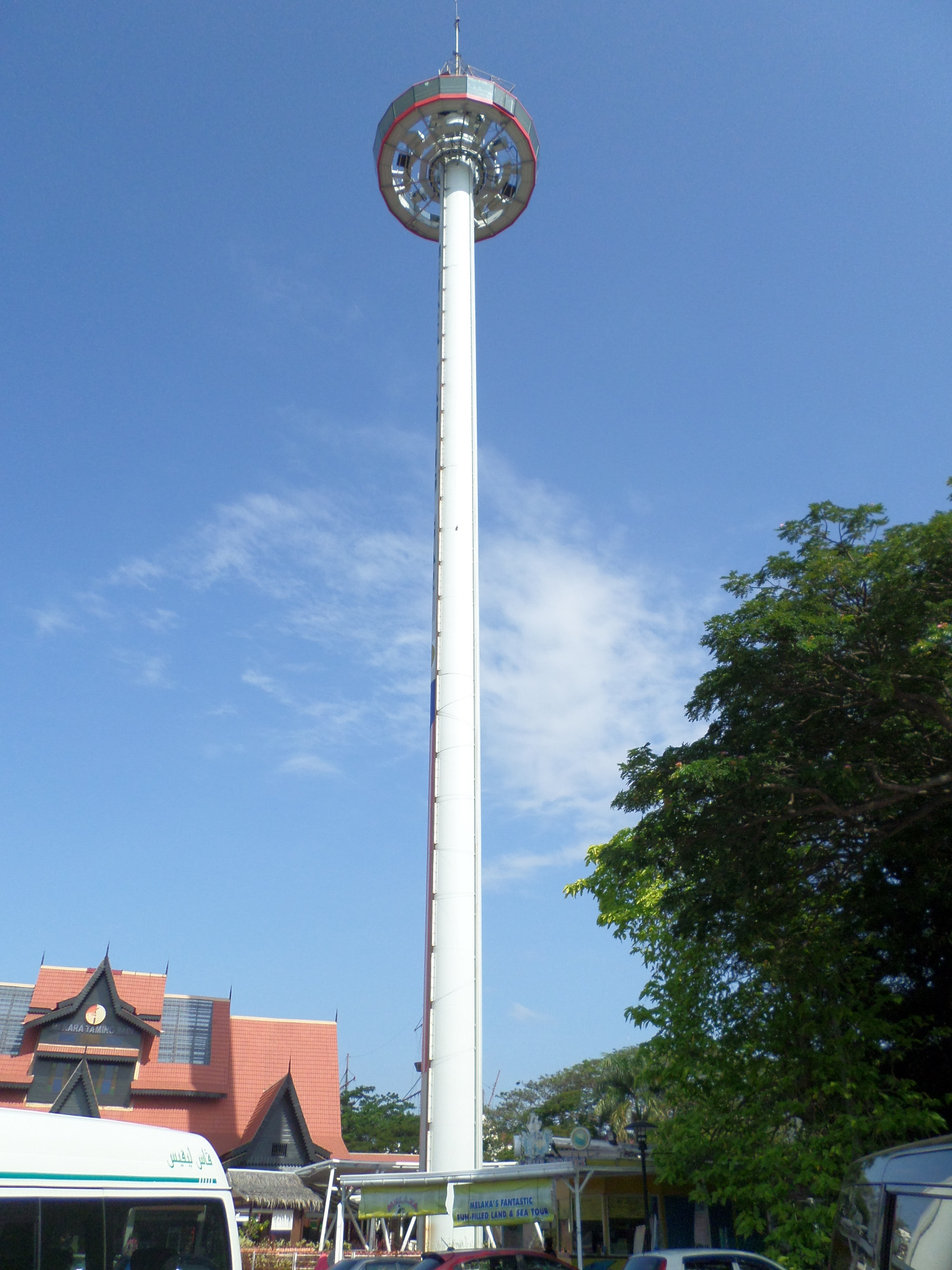
- Interactive map of the Taming Sari Tower area

Record height
- Tallest in Malacca from 2008 to 2014^{[I]}
- Preceded by: Emperor Hotel
- Surpassed by: The Shore Sky Tower Malacca

General information
- Type: Gyro tower
- Location: Malacca City, Malaysia
- Coordinates: 2°11′27.0″N 102°14′49.6″E
- Construction started: August 2006
- Completed: March 2008
- Opened: 18 April 2008
- Inaugurated: 17 May 2008
- Cost: MYR 2 million
- Owner: Melaka Taming Sari Berhad (subsidiary of Kumpulan Melaka Berhad, itself the subsidiary of Malacca Chief Minister Incorporated)

Height
- Antenna spire: 110 m (360 ft)
- Roof: 100 m (330 ft)
- Observatory: 80 m (260 ft)

Technical details
- Structural system: Concrete
- Floor count: 24

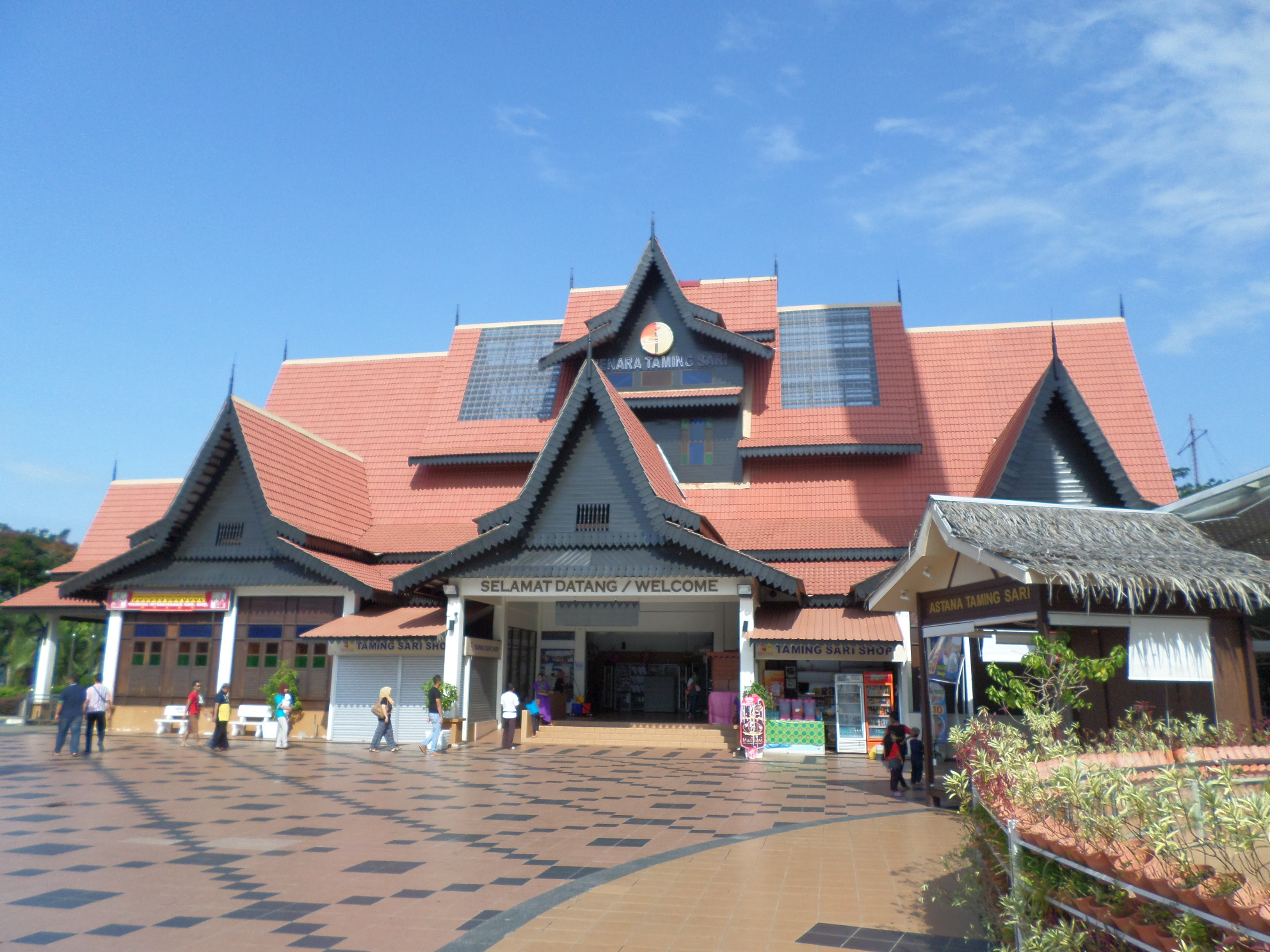
Ticketing counter building

Taming Sari Tower is a 24-story, 110-meter-tall gyro tower in Malacca City, Malacca, Malaysia. It is the first and tallest gyro tower in Malaysia. The tower was opened to the public on 18 April 2008 and officiated by then Chief Minister of Malacca, Mohd Ali Rustam on 17 May 2008. Its design was taken from the eponymous legendary keris which belonged to Hang Tuah. The tower offers a 360-degree panoramic view of Malacca City and beyond, and is able to accommodate 80 people per viewing session, which lasts about 7 minutes.
