= Astral Doors =

Swedish heavy metal band

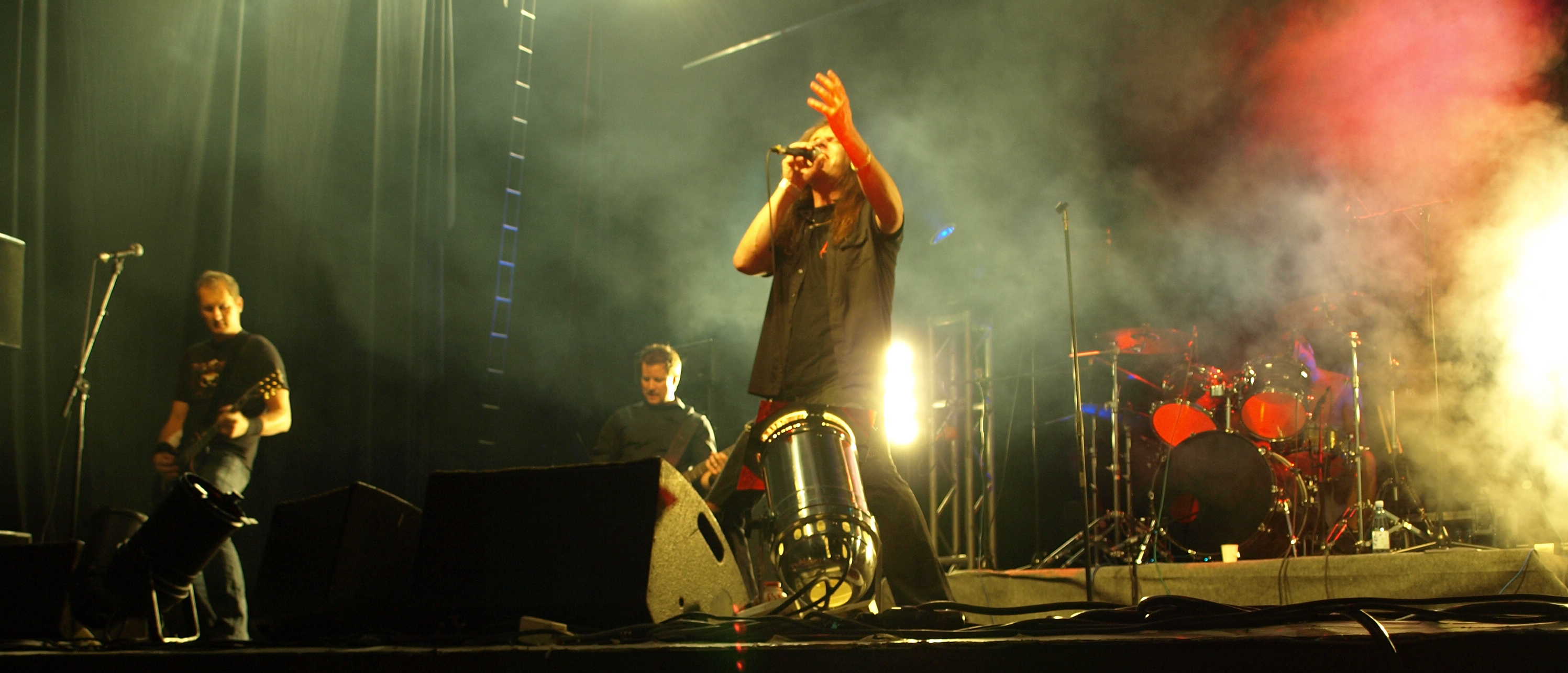
- Jalometalli 2008

Background information
- Origin: Borlänge, Sweden
- Genres: Heavy metal; hard rock; power metal
- Years active: 2002–present
- Label: Locomotive Music
- Members: Nils Patrik Johansson; Joakim Roberg; Joachim Nordlund; Johan Lindstedt; Ulf Lagerstrom
- Past members: Martin Haglund; Mika Itaranta
- Website: astraldoors.com

Astral Doors is a Swedish heavy metal band formed in Borlänge in 2002. They have released nine studio albums and an EP. Their latest work is Worship or Die, released in 2019.

== History ==
Nils Patrik Johansson, Joachim Nordlund and Martin Haglund all inhabited the Swedish town of Borlänge, where they all practiced with their respective bands at a club called the Rock House. Nordlund and Johansson barely knew each other, and neither were aware of Martin Haglund. Johansson's melodic metal band, Staircase, lost its drummer in 1991, and their search for a replacement led them to Johan Lindstedt, who was a drummer for a techno thrash metal band. Lindsedt played briefly for Staircase before moving on to a rap metal group, Buckshot OD.

In 1998, Johansson and Lindsedt were in another band together: Barfly. Influenced by Black Sabbath and Deep Purple, the band went on until 2002, when it broke up following a musical decline during their fourth demo recording. The engineer for the demo recording was another Rock House regular, Nordlund, frontman for the band Erina. A lot of Johansson's trademark Dio-esque sound was developed during this time.

Soon after, Nordlund and Lindstedt began writing together, and they contacted Johansson. The songs that came out of their collaboration dealt with "dark, cosmic" material, the best example of this was "Far Beyond the Astral Doors". They named themselves "Astral Doors" shortly after writing the song. They hired Joakim Roberg, whom they had collaborated with on some of the songs, and Martin Haglund of the band earflog, as members, and began the project.

The band reached a temporary climax when they were a support act on Blind Guardian's 2006 tour for the album A Twist in the Myth.

=== Of the Son and the Father ===
Their sound was allegedly born through their song "Of the Son and the Father", about the clergy sex abuse scandal in the United States. Haglund, who had begun the project as the bassist, soon switched to guitar, and Mika Itäranta was hired to play bass. All six members were now in place. Of the Son and the Father was released in 2003, and shot to No. 5 in Rock Hard, a well known German |metal magazine.

The cover chosen for OSF depicted priests being crucified for their crimes. The cover did not encounter any problems in the west, but was challenged by the Japanese distributor, who felt it was too offensive. As a result, the Japanese cover features a spaceship, and is called Cloudbreaker, after the first song on the album.

=== Evil Is Forever and Astralism ===
Evil Is Forever was a critical release for the band. They toured non-stop following its release, as the album landed them spots in several tours. Evil Is Forever is actually a James Bond reference, to the song "Diamonds Are Forever".

Astralism, released in 2006, continues the band's aggressive style, but the lyrics, according to the band, are those of "the thinking man... a quest for peace". This shines through in songs like "Black Rain", which is a song about the Atomic bomb dropped at Hiroshima, and "London Caves", which is about the terrorist attack on the London underground. Its cover has not faced criticism, but features a nun praying in front of a stone face, crying blood.

=== New Revelation and Requiem of Time ===
New Revelation was released in 2007. This album took on a more Power Metal influence and even contains some prog elements. This change in sound resulted in a mixed reception from fans.

Requiem of Time was released in early 2010. This was Martin Haglund's last album with Astral Doors; after mixing the record and he retired to spend more time with his family. Mika Itaranta also retired from roadlife to have kids. The album has 14 songs with two more songs for the Japanese edition on King Records. Ulf Lagerstrom was hired to replace Itaranta. Ulf had played in both Barfly and Lunatic Parade with Nils Patrik Johansson.

== Members ==
Current members

- Nils Patrik Johansson – vocals (2002-present)
- Johan Lindstedt – drums (2002-present)
- Joakim Roberg – keyboard, organ (2002-present)
- Joachim Nordlund – guitar (2002-present)
- Ulf Lagerström – bass (2009-present)
- Mats Gesar – guitar (2014-present)

Former members

- Mika Itäranta – bass (2002–2009)
- Martin Haglund – guitar (2002–2010)

Timeline

== Discography ==
- Of the Son and the Father (2003) – Cloudbreaker in Japan
- Evil Is Forever (2005)
- Raiders of the Ark (EP, 2005)
- Astralism (2006)
- New Revelation (2007)
- Requiem of Time (2010)
- Testament of Rock (compilation, 2010)
- Jerusalem (2011)
- Notes from the Shadows (2014)
- Black Eyed Children (2017)
- Worship or Die (2019)
- The End of It All (2024)
