= Gods and Generals (album) =

Studio album by Civil War
- Released: May 6, 2015
- Recorded: 2014
- Genre: Power metal, Heavy metal
- Length: 56:01
- Label: Napalm Records
- Producer: Civil War

Civil War chronology
The Killer Angels (2013)	Gods and Generals (2015)	The Last Full Measure (2016)

Gods and Generals is the second studio album by Swedish power metal band Civil War, released in 2015. The album's name is a reference to the 1966 novel of the same title, Gods and Generals.

== Track listing ==
No.	Title	Length
1.	"War of the World"	5:14
2.	"Bay of Pigs"	5:34
3.	"Braveheart"	3:24
4.	"The Mad Piper"	4:58
5.	"USS Monitor"	3:42
6.	"Tears from the North"	4:19
7.	"Admiral Over the Oceans"	4:50
8.	"Back to Iwo Jima"	5:13
9.	"Schindler's Ark"	5:32
10.	"Gods and Generals"	5:22
11.	"Knights of Dalecarlia"	4:32
12.	"Colours on My Shield"	3:21
Total length:		56:01

== Personnel ==
- Nils Patrik Johansson – vocals
- Rikard Sundén – guitar
- Petrus Granar – guitar
- Daniel Mÿhr – keyboards
- Daniel Mullback – drums

== Charts ==
Chart (2015)	Peak position
Belgian Albums (Ultratop Flanders)	186
Belgian Albums (Ultratop Wallonia)	184
German Albums (Offizielle Top 100)	74
Hungarian Albums (MAHASZ)	37
Swedish Albums (Sverigetopplistan)	38
