= Geiselwind =

- Municipality
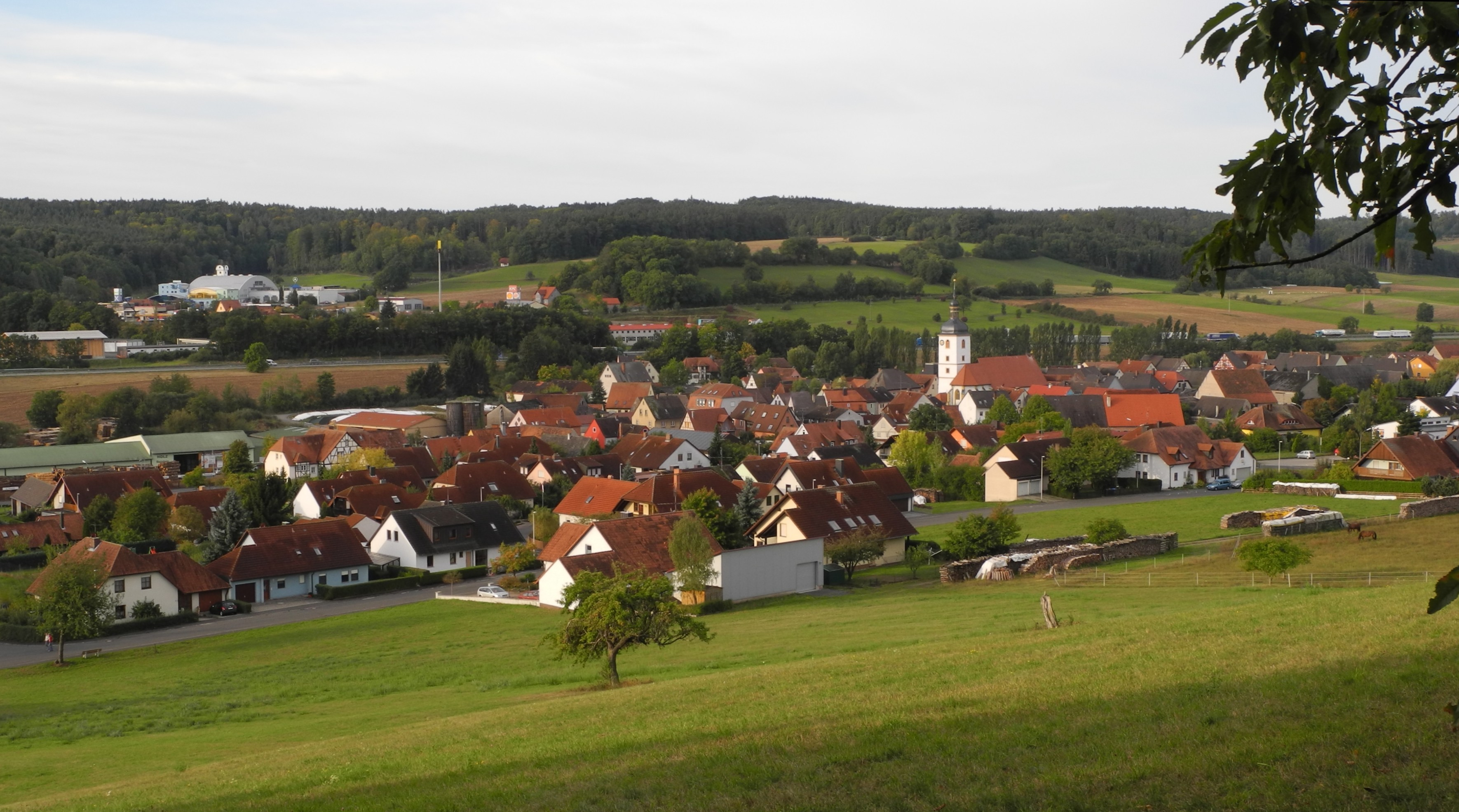
- Geiselwind seen from the north

- Coat of arms

- Location of Geiselwind within Kitzingen district
- Interactive map of Geiselwind
- Location within Germany Location within Bavaria
- Coordinates: 49°46′N 10°28′E
- Country: Germany
- State: Bavaria
- Admin. region: Unterfranken
- District: Kitzingen

Government
  - Mayor (2020–26): Ernst Nickel (FW)

Area
  - Total: 48.77 km^{2} (18.83 sq mi)
- Elevation: 345–442 m (1,132–1,450 ft)

Population (2025-12-31)
  - Total: 2,672
  - Density: 54.79/km^{2} (141.9/sq mi)
- Time zone: UTC+01:00 (CET)
  - Summer (DST): UTC+02:00 (CEST)
- Postal codes: 96160
- Dialling codes: 09556 /09555
- Vehicle registration: KT
- Website: www.geiselwind.de

Geiselwind is a market town in Lower Franconia (Bavaria) in the district of Kitzingen in Germany. It has a population of around 2,300.

== Geography ==
=== Location ===
Geiselwind is today in the region of Lower Franconia (Würzburg). Until administrative reform Geiselwind belonged to the region of Middle Franconia. On the edge of the municipal area is the Dreifrankenstein ("Three Franconia Stone"), where the regions of Lower Franconia and Middle Franconia and Upper Franconia meet.

=== Subdivision ===
Geiselwind has the following Ortsteile: Burggrub, Dürrnbuch, Ebersbrunn, Füttersee, Geiselwind, Gräfenneuses, Holzberndorf, Ilmenau, Langenberg, Rehweiler, Wasserberndorf and Freihaslach.

== History ==
The name Geiselwind can be dated to the 8th century AD. At this time by decree of the German emperor, Wends were settled in the Frankish area.

Geiselwind market in today's Lower Franconia belonged to the sovereign Grafschaft von Schwarzenberg. With the Rheinbundakte in 1806 the place came to Bavaria. In the course of the administrative reforms of Bavaria, today's municipality was created with the municipality edict of 1818.

== Demographics ==
In the area of the municipality, in 1970 2,125, in 1987 2,016 and in 2000 2,323, inhabitants were counted.

== Governance ==
The mayor is Ernst Nickel (free voter/land community). In 2002 he succeeded Gottfried Schaller (free voter/land community).

== Economy ==
The local rate incomes amounted in the year 1999 to 997000 euro, of which the trade tax incomes (net) amounted to 303000 euros.

In 1998 the number of employees on the social welfare contribution rolls was:

- On the land and forestry and in the producing trade: 0
- In the region, in trade and traffic: 203
- In other economic sectors: 243
- Working at home: 802.

In the processing trade there were 6 enterprises, in the building main trade 8 enterprises.

In 1999 there were 109 agricultural enterprises with a farmed area of 21.07 square kilometres, of which 12.92 km² were arable and 8.09 km² of continuously grass. The largest employers are:

- Freizeit-Land Geiselwind (Leisure park Geiselwind)
- Lorry and truck terminal Strohofer
- Reinlein Parkett

== Education ==
In the year 1999 the following schools existed:

- Kindergartens: 100 kindergarten places with 102 children
- Elementary schools: 1 with 16 teachers and 278 pupils
- Six-form high schools: None
- High Schools: None
