= Gyro tower =

Observation tower with moving platform

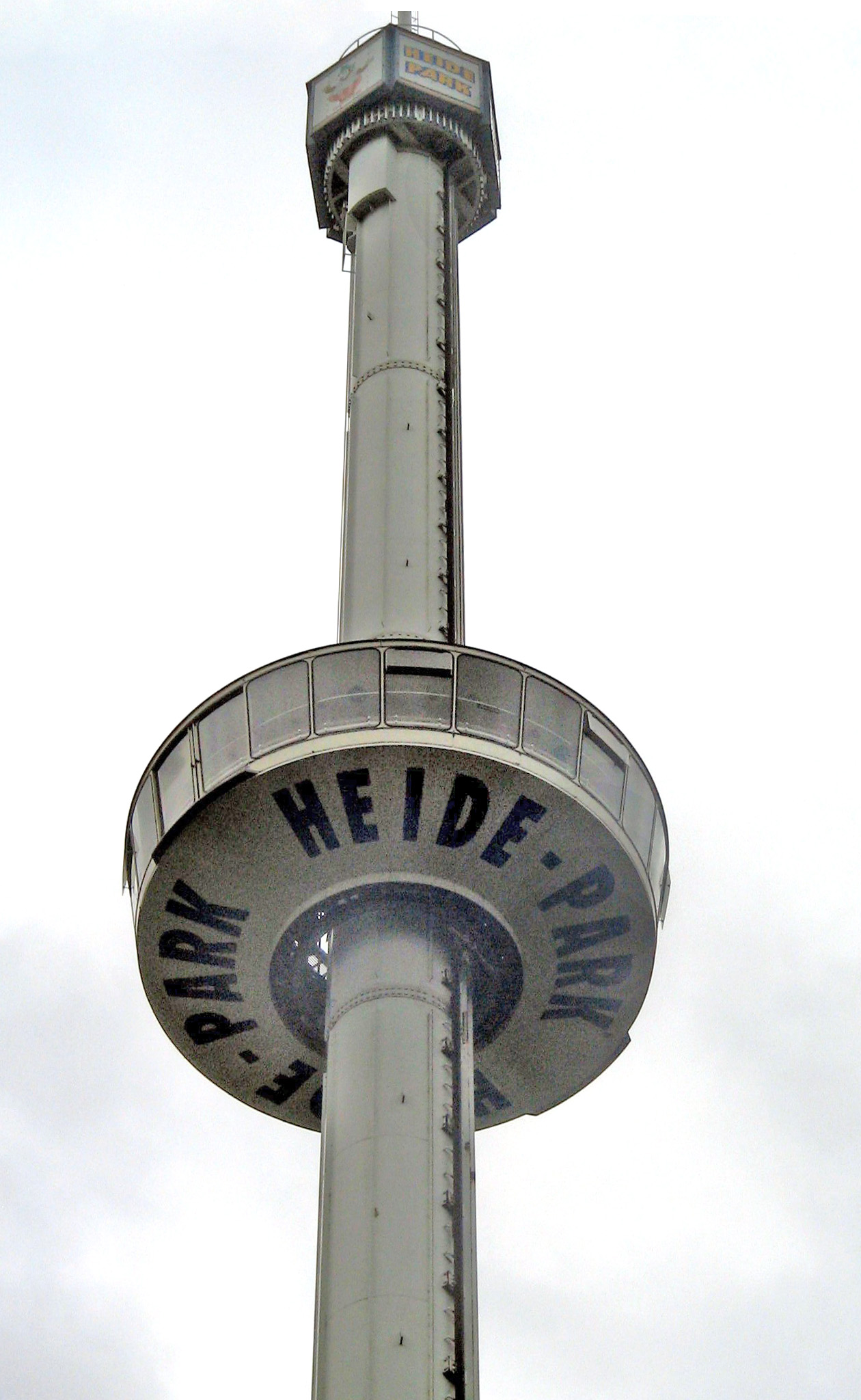
Gyro tower in the Heide Park

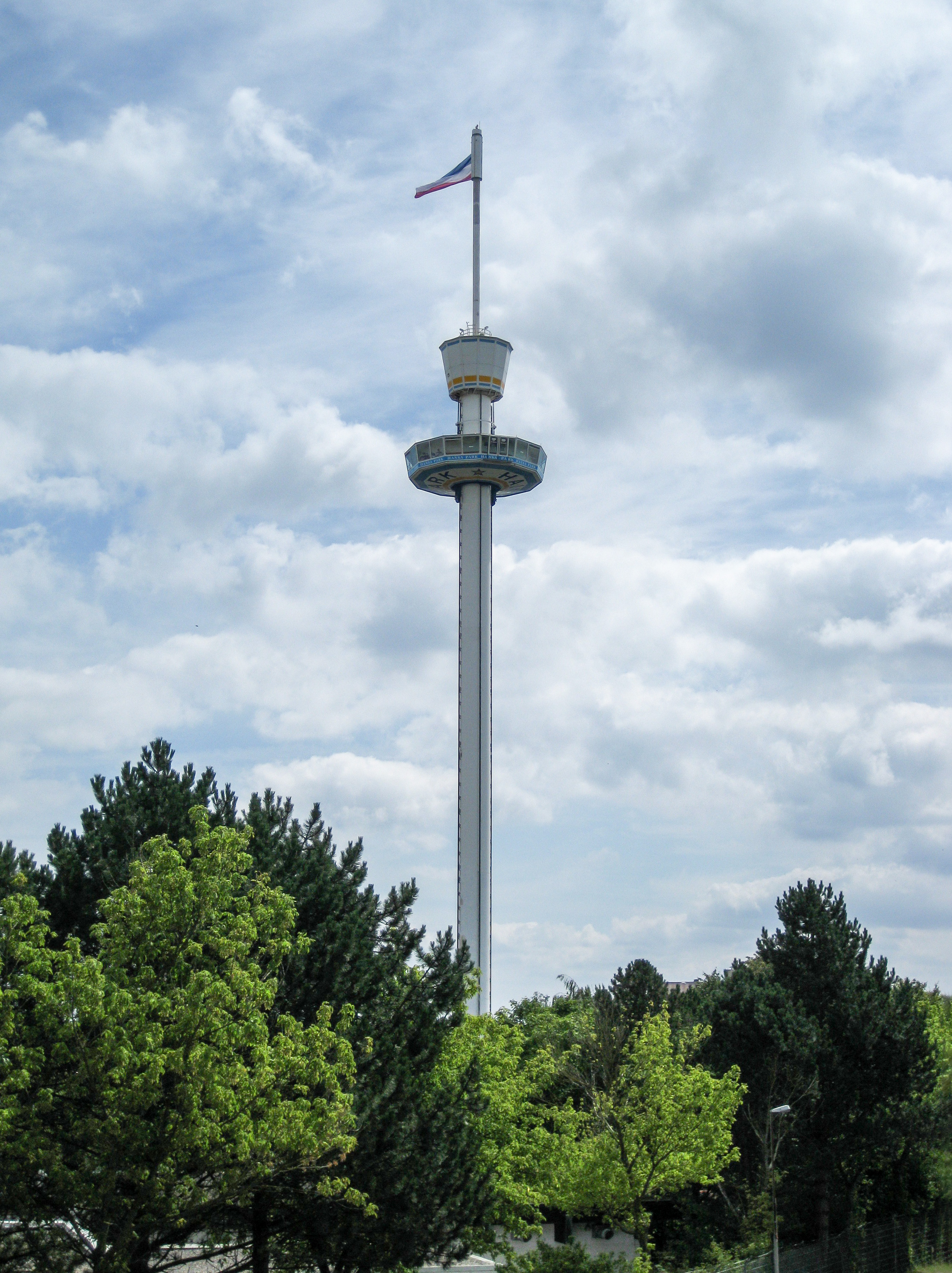
Gyro tower Holsteinturm in Hansa-Park, Sierksdorf, Schleswig-Holstein

A gyro tower, or panoramic tower, is a revolving observation tower with a vertically moving platform. A gyro tower's observation deck is not simply raised to provide its passengers a spectacular view, it is also rotated around the supporting mast, either once in the raised position or while traveling up and down the center mast.

Gyro towers are rarely part of funfairs, but can be found more often in permanent amusement parks. A well-known American gyro tower is the Kissing Tower at Hersheypark.

A unique gyro tower is the Space Tower, which sits atop the Euromast in Rotterdam.

== Notable gyro towers ==
- Carolina Skytower, Carowinds, North Carolina, U.S.
- Euro-Tower, Europa-Park, Germany
- Sky Cabin, Knott's Berry Farm, Buena Park, California U.S.
- Kissing Tower, Hersheypark, Hershey, Pennsylvania, U.S.
- Star Tower, California's Great America, Santa Clara, California U.S.
- Sky Tower, SeaWorld San Diego, San Diego, California U.S.
- Sky Tower, SeaWorld Orlando, Orlando, Florida U.S.
- Sky Trek Tower, Six Flags Great America, Gurnee, Illinois, U.S.
- Space Needle, Seattle Center, Seattle, Washington, U.S.
- Panorama Tower, Heide-Park, Germany
- Space Tower, Minnesota State Fair, Falcon Heights, Minnesota, U.S.
- Infinito, Terra Mitica, Spain
- Taming Sari Tower, Malacca, Malaysia (First gyro tower in Malaysia)
- Panoraama, Linnanmäki, Helsinki, Finland
- La Gyrotour, Futuroscope, France
- Observation Tower, Hangzhou Paradise, Hangzhou, Zhejiang, China
- Top o' Texas Tower, State Fair of Texas, Dallas, Texas U.S.
- Sky Tower, Fuli Ocean Happy World, China
- Eagle's Eye, Sun World Hon Thom Nature Park, Vietnam
- Observation Tower, Legoland Malaysia Resort, Johor Bahru, Malaysia

=== Defunct ===
- Space Spiral, Cedar Point, Sandusky, Ohio, U.S. (Demolished September 12, 2012)
- Skyscraper, Geauga Lake, Aurora, Ohio, U.S. (Dismantled in July 2009, turned to scrap)
- Polo Tower, Morecambe, United Kingdom (Disused from 1999, passenger car removed in 2008. Demolished June 2017)
- Sky Spiral, Aquarena Springs, San Marcos, Texas U.S. (Closed in 1995, Demolished in 2012.)
- Observation Tower, Kingdoms 3 (Originally Lion's King Safari), Atlanta, Georgia U.S. (Closed in 1970s)
- Space Needle, Main Street Pier, Daytona Beach, Florida U.S. (On the beach, dismantled September 2012)
- Unknown, Seville Expo '92, Sevilla, Spain. (Built for 1992 Sevilla's World Fair, and then the Cartuja Island city park. Dismantled in 1996).
- Astro Needle, Myrtle Beach, South Carolina, U.S. (dismantled mid-1980s)
- Falls Tower, Niagara Falls, Clifton Hills, Canada (dismantled November 2006)
- Fun Pier Sky Tower Wildwood, New Jersey, U.S. (dismantled 2009)
- Sky Tower, Atlantic City, New Jersey, Central Pier (demolished November 1989)
- Astroneedle, Six Flags AstroWorld, Houston, Texas U.S. (Dismantled in 2000)
- Panoramic, Meli Park, Belgium (Closed 2009)
- Sky Tower, Marineland of the Pacific, Palos Verdes, California U.S. (closed 1987, dismantled September 1995)
- Astrotower, Astroland, New York, U.S. (disused from 2010, shortened due to structural concerns, dismantled June 2013)
- Space Needle State Fair Park, Oklahoma City, Oklahoma, U.S. (closed 2010 after flood damaged electrical system, dismantled 2018)
- Totem Tower, Fort Dells later Dells Crossroads, Wisconsin Dells, Wisconsin (opened June 1, 1966, 4th ride of this kind in US, 7th in the world, 335 ft tall. Park closed permanently in 1990, tower auctioned sometime before 1997 to a private party)
- Sky Tower, Rhyl, United Kingdom. Passenger car removed in 2017. Tower still standing. Used as a Light pole
- Spirale, La Ronde, Montreal, Quebec, Canada (Opened in 1967 double cabin. Closed in 2018, demolished in November 2025)
- Holstein Tower, Hansa-Park, Sierksdorf, Schleswig-Holstein, Germany (Opened in 1987. Closed in 2024, demolished in January 2025)
- Tiger Sky Tower, Imbiah Lookout, Sentosa, Singapore, Asia (Closed December 28, 2018. To be relocated)
- Jurassic Skyline, Weymouth Pier, United Kingdom (Closed in 2019. Dismantled)
- Lisebergstornet, Liseberg, Gothenburg, Sweden (Closed in 2010. Converted into drop tower. Reopened as AtmosFear in April 2011)

== See also ==
- List of Intamin observation towers
- Top of the World – once the tallest transportable gyro tower in the world
- Astroland, Coney Island (New York City)
