= Preaching at the Breeze =

Live album by Powerwolf
- Released: 6 January 2017
- Recorded: 14 August 2015
- Genre: Power metal; heavy metal; speed metal
- Language: English; Latin; German
- Label: Napalm Records

Powerwolf chronology
The Metal Mass – Live (2016)	Preaching at the Breeze (2017)	The Sacrament of Sin (2018)

Preaching at the Breeze is the third live album by German power metal band Powerwolf. It was released on 6 January 2017.

== Track listing ==
No.	Title	Length
1.	"Lupus Daemonis (Intro)"
2.	"Sanctified with Dynamite"
3.	"Coleus Sanctus"
4.	"Army of the Night"
5.	"Amen & Attack"
6.	"Resurrection by Erection"
7.	"Armata Strigoi"
8.	"Kreuzfeuer"
9.	"Werewolves of Armenia"
10.	"In the Name of God (Deus Vult)"
11.	"Blessed & Possessed"
12.	"All We Need Is Blood"
13.	"Dead Boys Don't Cry"
14.	"We Drink Your Blood"
15.	"Lupus Dei"

== Personnel ==
- Attila Dorn – vocals
- Matthew Greywolf – lead guitar
- Charles Greywolf – rhythm guitar
- Roel van Helden – drums, percussion
- Falk Maria Schlegel – keyboards
