= Fire & Forgive =

Song by Powerwolf

Single by Powerwolf

from the album The Sacrament of Sin
- Language: English; Latin
- Released: 22 June 2018
- Recorded: 2018
- Studio: Fascination Street Studios (Gothenburg, Sweden)
- Genre: Power metal; heavy metal
- Length: 4:30
- Label: Napalm Records
- Songwriter(s): Attila Dorn; Charles Greywolf; Matthew Greywolf; Falk Maria Schlegel; Roel van Helden
- Producer(s): Jens Bogren

Powerwolf singles chronology
"Demons Are a Girl's Best Friend" (2018)	"Fire & Forgive" (2018)	"Kiss of the Cobra King" (2019)

Audio sample
- file; help

Music video
- "Fire & Forgive" on YouTube

"Fire & Forgive" is a song by German power metal band Powerwolf. It was a second single released from their 2018 album The Sacrament of Sin.

== Music video ==
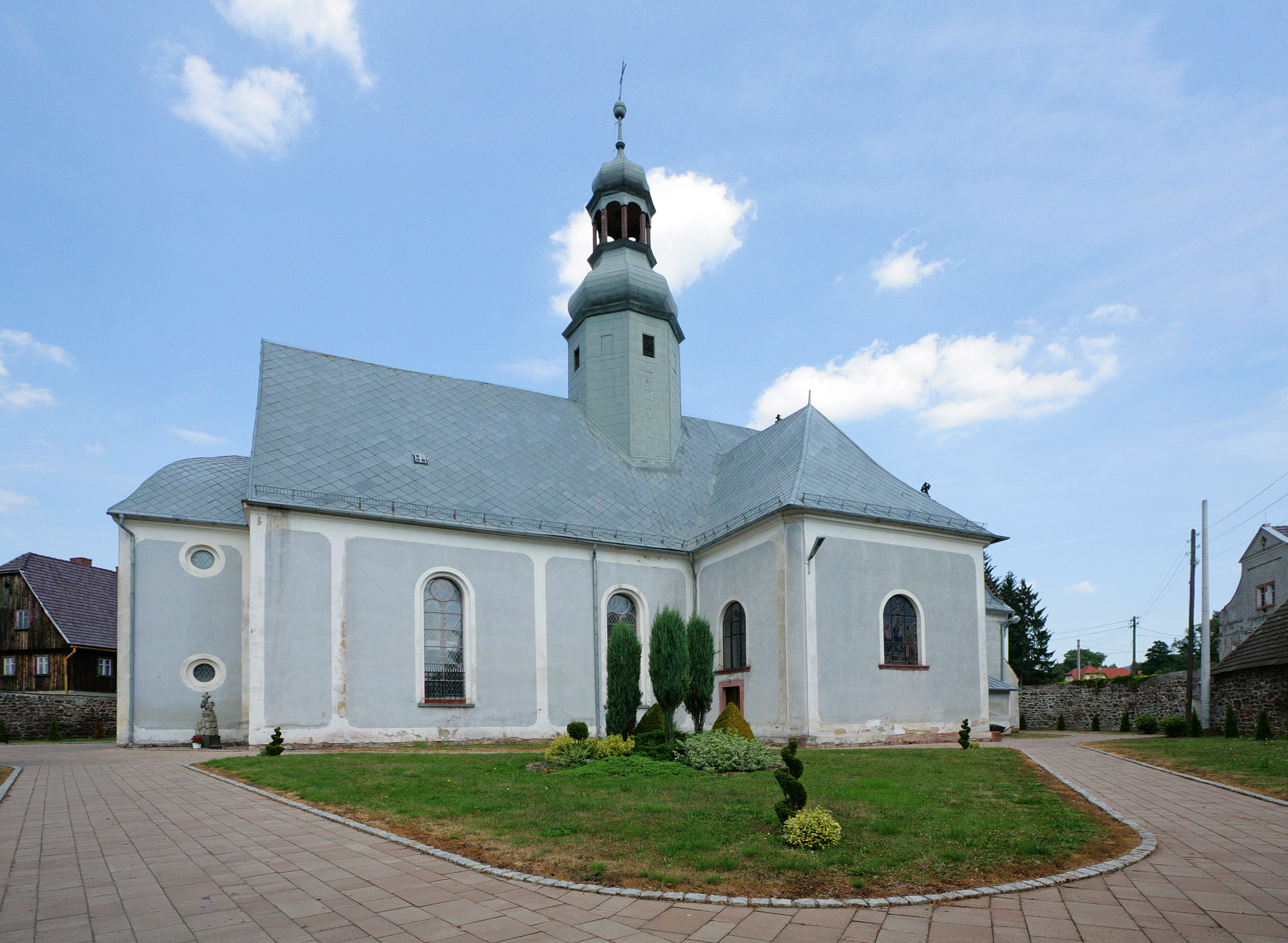
The music video for "Fire & Forgive" was filmed in the Church of Saint Mary Magdalene in Ścinawka Średnia, Poland.

The video tells a story of a girl in a church, who becomes possessed as the result of receiving the Blessed Sacrament from the priest. Powerwolf's vocalist Attila Dorn along with keyboardist Falk Maria Schlegel and a few nuns perform an exorcism on the girl. The video also references the Index Librorum Prohibitorum by showing monks burning confiscated books.

Video's story takes place "somewhere in southern Europe" in 1931, although throughout the video, the viewer can see signs of it taking place in Poland (ex. a religious songbook written in Polish, or the date 966–1966, which is a memorial to the Millennium of Poland), where the video was recorded.

=== Controversy ===
The video was recorded in the Church of Saint Mary Magdalene in Ścinawka Średnia, Poland. After releasing it on YouTube on 22 June 2018, Powerwolf was accused by the local curia that the video "overstepped limits with regard both to the sacredness of the church as well as to the trust shown by the parish priest in charge of that holy place".

Many Polish newspapers wrote about this controversy. Most of them said that the band is satanic and anti-church.

== Live performances ==
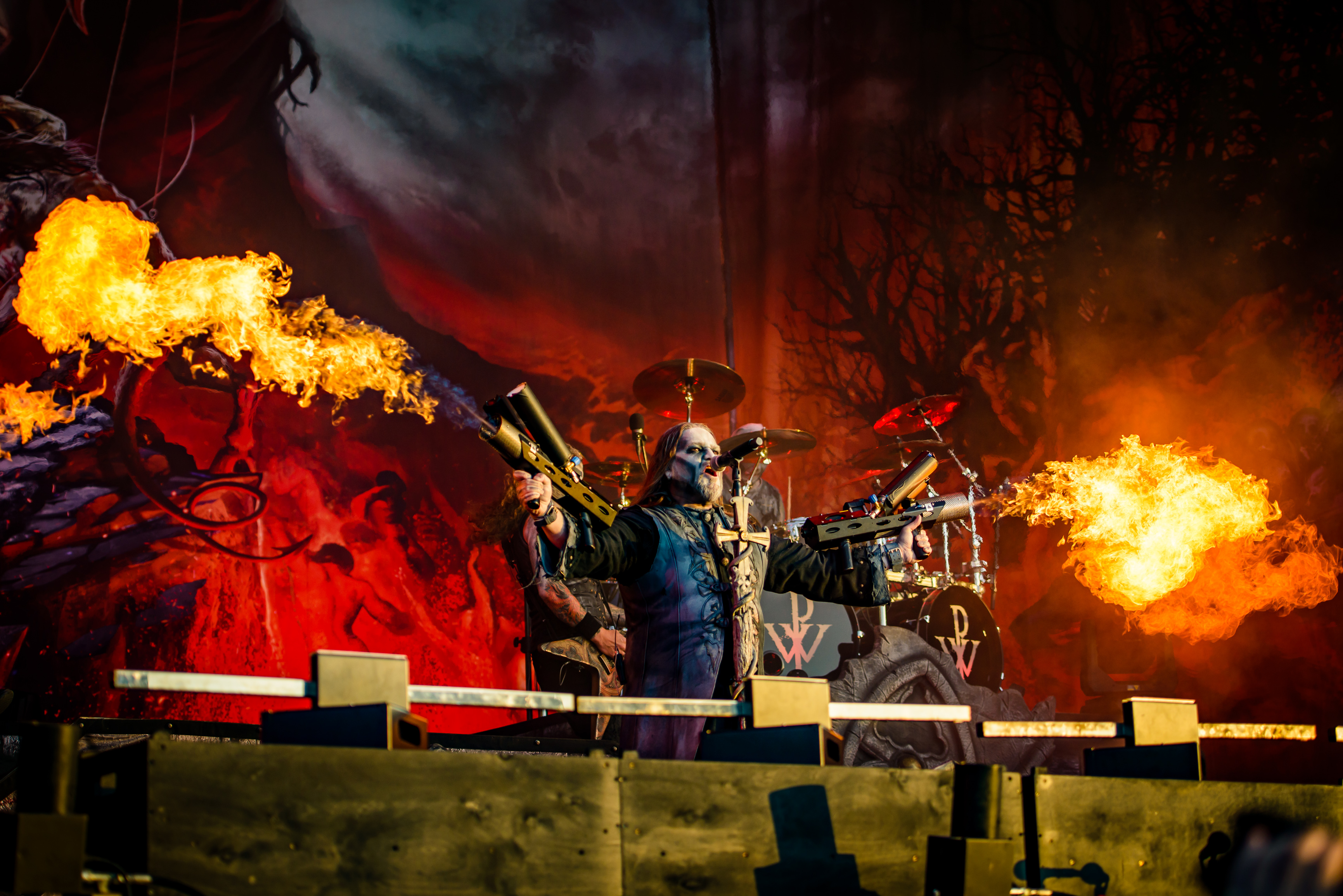
Attila Dorn wearing dual arm mounted flamethrowers while performing "Fire & Forgive"

"Fire & Forgive" is played in a fast, typical Powerwolf style. While performing the song, the band uses a big amount of pyrotechnics. The vocalist Attila Dorn usually wears dual arm mounted flame throwers after the song's guitar solo.

== Personnel ==
Powerwolf

- Attila Dorn – vocals
- Matthew Greywolf – lead and rhythm guitar
- Charles Greywolf – bass and rhythm guitar
- Roel van Helden – drums, percussion
- Falk Maria Schlegel – organ, keyboards

Additional musicians

- Dianne van Giersbergen – vocals (additional)
- Marcela Bovio – vocals (additional)
- John Cuijpers – vocals (additional)
- Jacobus van Bakel – vocals (additional)
- Dirk Bersweiler – vocals (choir, additional)
- James Boyle – vocals (choir, additional)
- Manfred Flick – vocals (choir, additional)
- Titan Fox – vocals (choir, additional)
- Tom Kurt Germann – vocals (choir, additional)
- Björn Hacket – vocals (choir, additional)
- Daniel Herzmann – vocals (choir, additional)
- Toni Hilbert – vocals (choir, additional)
- Fritz Körber – vocals (choir, additional)
- Dirk Reichel – vocals (choir, additional)
- PA'dam Chamber Choir – vocals (choir)

Technical personnel

- Jens Bogren – producer, mixer, recording, engineer
- David Buballa – recording, editing
- Joost van den Broek – arrangements (orchestral, choir), recording (choir), programming, score (choir)
- Maria van Nieukerken – PA'dam Chamber Choir conductor
- Tony Lindgren – mastering
- Jos Driessen – engineer (choir)
- Linus Corneliusson – mixer, editing

Other personnel

- Zsofia Dankova – cover art, illustrations
- Matthew Greywolf – layout
- Tim Tronckoe – photography
- Matteo Vdiva – photography
