= The Metal Mass – Live =

Video by Powerwolf
- Released: 27 July 2016 (Japan); 29 July 2016 (Europe)
- Recorded: 11 July 2015 (Masters of Rock); 14 August 2015 (Summer Breeze Open Air); 2 October 2015 (Turbinenhalle Oberhausen)
- Genre: Power metal; heavy metal; speed metal
- Label: Napalm Records (Europe); Soyuz Music (Russia); Chaos Reigns (Japan)
- Director: Ville Lipiänen

Powerwolf chronology
Blessed & Possessed (2015)	The Metal Mass – Live (2016)	Preaching at the Breeze (2017)

The Metal Mass – Live is the second video album by German power metal band Powerwolf. The album contains live footage of three shows: Masters of Rock 2015, Summer Breeze 2015, Oberhausen Turbinenhalle, music videos to "Amen & Attack", "Army of the Night", "We Drink Your Blood" and "Sanctified with Dynamite", a festival documentation "A Day at Summer Breeze" and a tour documentation movie "Kreuzweg – Of Wolves and Men".

The album was announced on 30 May 2016.

== Track listing ==
DVD/Blu-Ray 1: Masters of Rock 2015 Show
No.	Title	Length
1.	"Sanctified with Dynamite"
2.	"Coleus Sanctus"
3.	"Army of the Night"
4.	"Amen & Attack"
5.	"Resurrection by Erection"
6.	"Armata Strigoi"
7.	"Sacred & Wild"
8.	"All We Need Is Blood"
9.	"Drumsolo"
10.	"Kreuzfeuer"
11.	"Werewolves of Armenia"
12.	"We Drink Your Blood"
13.	"Lupus Dei"
14.	"Raise Your Fist, Evangelist"
15.	"In The Name of God (Deus Vult)"

DVD 2/Blu-Ray 1: Summer Breeze 2015 Show
No.	Title	Length
1.	"Sanctified with Dynamite"
2.	"Coleus Sanctus"
3.	"Army of the Night"
4.	"Amen & Attack"
5.	"Resurrection by Erection"
6.	"Armata Strigoi"
7.	"Kreuzfeuer"
8.	"Werewolves of Armenia"
9.	"In the Name of God (Deus Vult)"
10.	"Blessed & Possessed"
11.	"All We Need Is Blood"
12.	"Dead Boys Don't Cry"
13.	"We Drink Your Blood"
14.	"Lupus Dei"

DVD 3/Blu-Ray 2: Wolfsnächte Tour 2015 Show
No.	Title	Length
1.	"Blessed & Possessed"
2.	"Coleus Sanctus"
3.	"Amen & Attack"
4.	"Cardinal Sin"
5.	"Army of the Night"
6.	"Resurrection by Erection"
7.	"Armata Strigoi"
8.	"Drumsolo"
9.	"Dead Boys Don't Cry"
10.	"Let There Be Night"
11.	"Werewolves of Armenia"
12.	"In the Name of God (Deus Vult"
13.	"We Drink Your Blood"
14.	"Lupus Dei"
15.	"Sanctified with Dynamite"
16.	"Kreuzfeuer"

CD
No.	Title	Length
1.	"Blessed & Possessed"
2.	"Coleus Sanctus"
3.	"Amen & Attack"
4.	"Cardinal Sin"
5.	"Army of the Night"
6.	"Resurrection by Erection"
7.	"Armata Strigoi"
8.	"Dead Boys Don't Cry"
9.	"Let There Be Night"
10.	"Werewolves of Armenia"
11.	"In the Name of God (Deus Vult)"
12.	"We Drink Your Blood"
13.	"Lupus Dei"
14.	"Sanctified with Dynamite"
15.	"Kreuzfeuer"
16.	"All We Need Is Blood"

== Personnel ==
- Attila Dorn – vocals
- Matthew Greywolf – lead guitar
- Charles Greywolf – rhythm guitar
- Roel van Helden – percussion
- Falk Maria Schlegel – keyboards

== Charts ==
=== DVD ===
Chart (2019)	Peak position
Austrian Albums (Ö3 Austria)	5
Dutch Albums (Album Top 100)	16
Belgian Albums (Ultratop Wallonia)	2
Belgian Albums (Ultratop Flanders)	5

=== CD ===
Chart (2019)	Peak position
German Albums (Offizielle Top 100)	4
Swiss Albums (Schweizer Hitparade)	30
Belgian Albums (Ultratop Flanders)	159
Belgian Albums (Ultratop Wallonia)	79

== Release history ==
Region	Date	Format	Label	Edition(s)	Catalog
Japan	27 July 2016	2 Blu-rays	Chaos Reigns	Limited edition, Japan	GQXS-90136-7
Japan	27 July 2016	2 DVD	Chaos Reigns	Limited edition, Japan	GQXS-90136-7
Japan	27 July 2016	CD + 2 DVD	Chaos Reigns	Limited edition, Japan	GQBS-90153-5
Japan	27 July 2016	CD + 2 Blu-rays	Chaos Reigns	Limited edition, Japan	GQBS-90153-5
Japan	27 July 2016	CD	Chaos Reigns	Japan	GQCS-90179
Russia	2016 (unofficial)	2 Blu-rays	Eagle Rock	Russia	52357 / 52358
Russia	29 July 2016	CD	Soyuz Music	Digipak	SZCD 9994-18
Worldwide	29 July 2016	CD + 2 Blu-rays	Napalm Records	Mediabook	NPR 672 BM
Worldwide	29 July 2016	CD	Napalm Records	Digipak	NPR 672 DP
