= Flowing Tears =

German gothic metal band

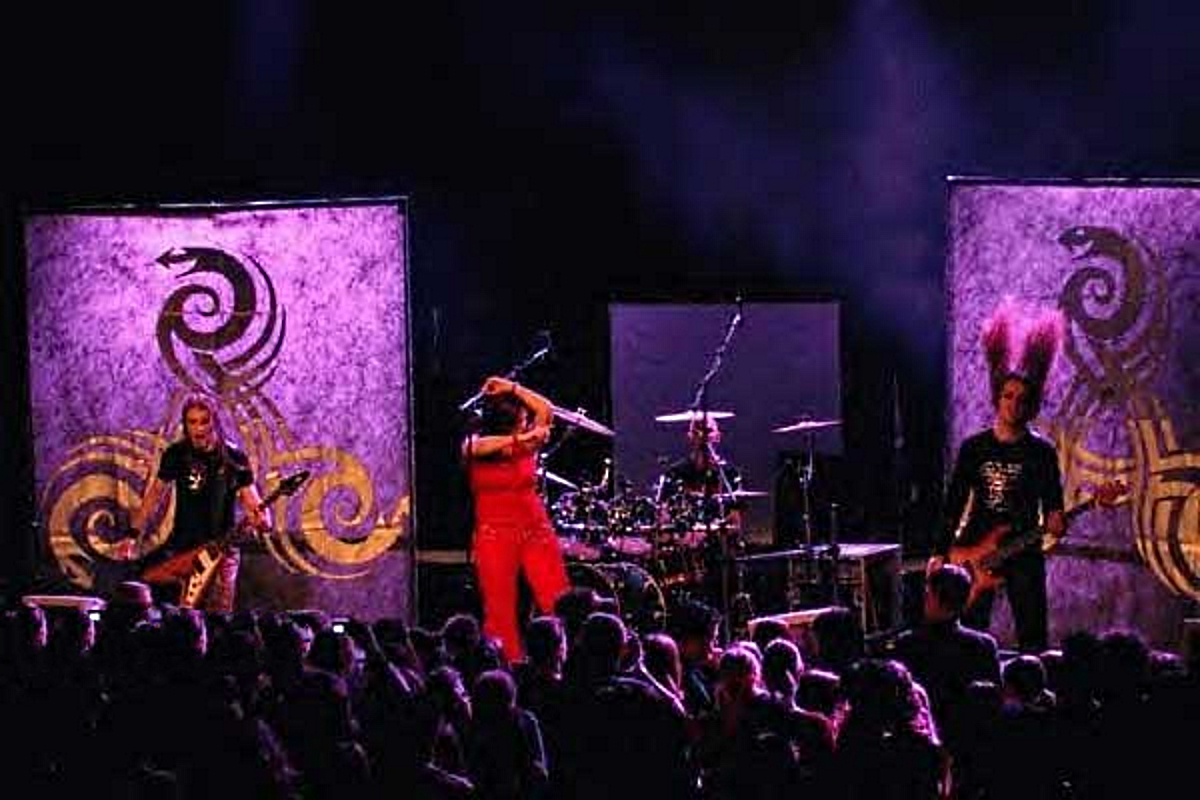
- Flowing Tears performing live in 2004. From left to right: Benjamin Buss, Helen Vogt, Stefan Gemballa, Frédéric Lesny.

Background information
- Also known as: Flowing Tears & Withered Flowers
- Origin: Wadgassen, Germany
- Genres: Gothic metal
- Years active: 1994–2014
- Labels: Seven Art; Century Media; Ascendance
- Members: Helen Vogt; Benjamin Buss; David Vogt; Stefan Gemballa
- Past members: Manfred Bersin; Cristian Zimmer; Stefanie Duchêne; Eric Hilt; Mike Voltz; Frédéric Lesny

Flowing Tears' typeface

Flowing Tears was a German gothic metal band founded in 1993 in Wadgassen. Their original name was Flowing Tears & Withered Flowers, which they used for their first several releases. The band's final lineup consisted of vocalist Helen Vogt, guitarist/keyboardist Benjamin Buss, bassist David Vogt and drummer Stefan Gemballa.

== History ==
=== 1994–1999: Formation and first albums ===
The band formed in 1994 under the moniker Flowing Tears & Withered Flowers. Under the first name, they released a demo called Bijou in 1995, two full-length albums: Swansongs in 1996 and Joy Parade in 1998, and an EP named Swallow in 1999. On Swansongs, Manfred Bersin contributed the male vocals. After the EP's release, the band abridged their name to "Flowing Tears".

=== 2002–2004: Serpentine and vocalist change ===
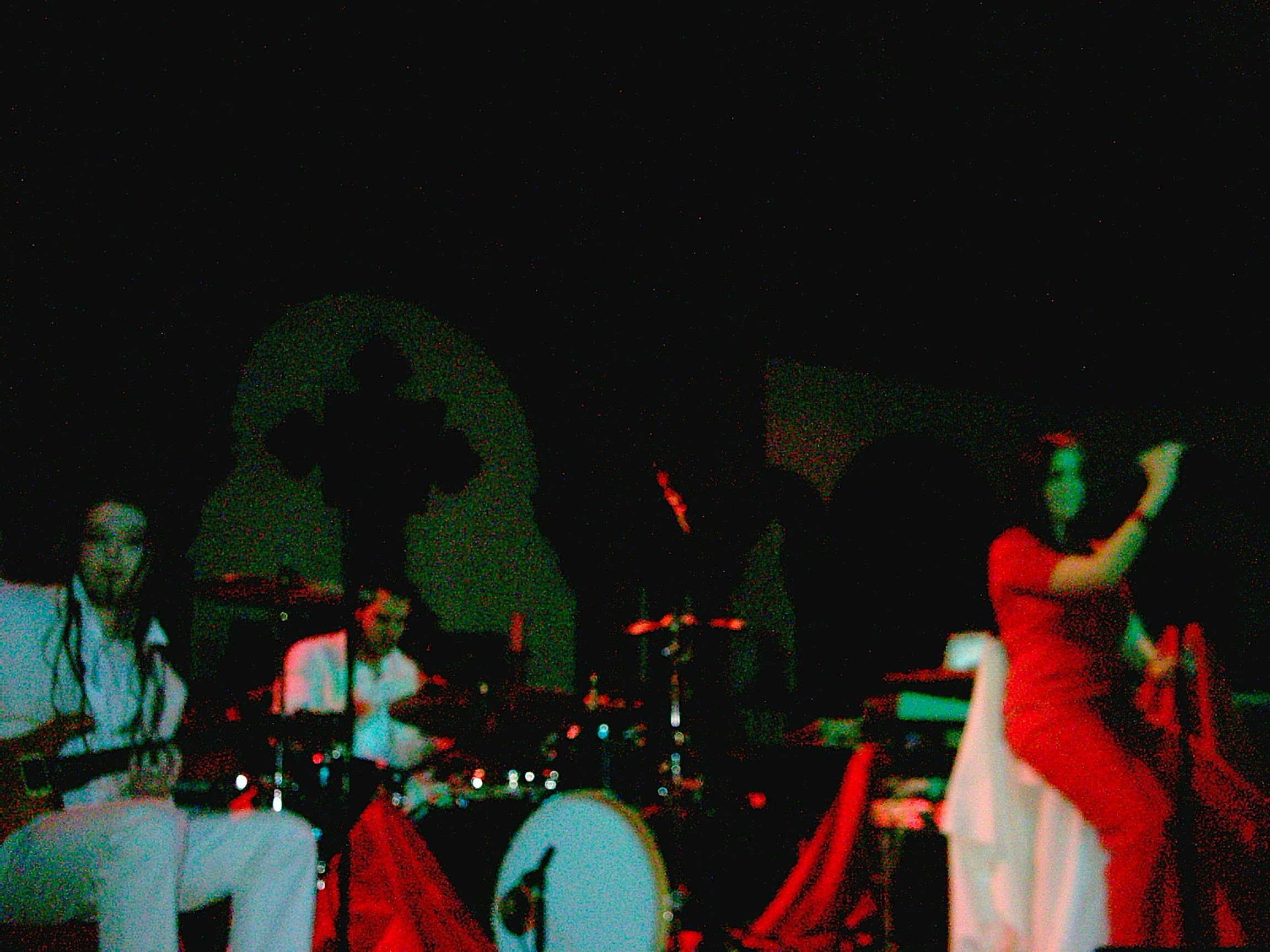
Flowing Tears concert during Sleepy Buildings Tour (Berlin, 10 March 2004)

With the release of Serpentine in 2002, the band would build on the work they did with Jade, adding a slightly more up tempo and a less melancholy sound. After the release of Serpentine, Stefanie Duchêne left the band for personal reasons. The replacement vocalist became Helen Vogt. With a sound similar to that of Serpentine, and Vogt's vocal similarities with Stefanie Duchêne's vocals, the band released their fifth studio album, Razorbliss.

The band toured with After Forever in April and May 2004. On 20 October 2004, just seven months after the release of Razorbliss, two founding members of Flowing Tears, Björn Lorson and Cristian Zimmer (the first of whom was still in the band's lineup at the time), died in a car accident.

=== 2008–2014: Thy Kingdom Gone and a hiatus ===
October 2008 saw the release of Flowing Tears' sixth full-length album, Thy Kingdom Gone. It is a concept album containing 12 songs, along with artwork made by Seth Siro Anton, an artist who has done work for Moonspell, Soilwork, and Paradise Lost.

The band is on hiatus according to a Facebook status update in January 2013 by Helen Vogt, she expressed that she does wish to record a new album someday. However, she announced in March 2014 that Thy Kingdom Gone would be the band's final album.

== Members ==
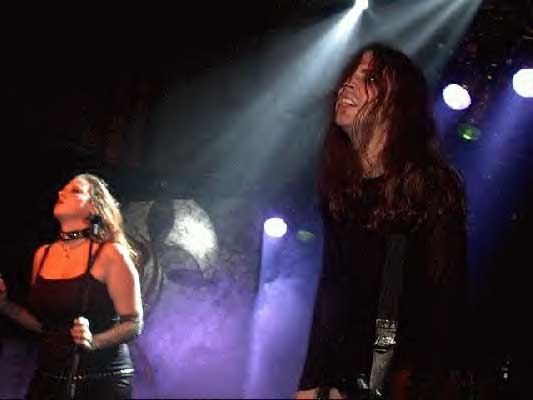
Helen Vogt and Frédéric Lesny (2004)

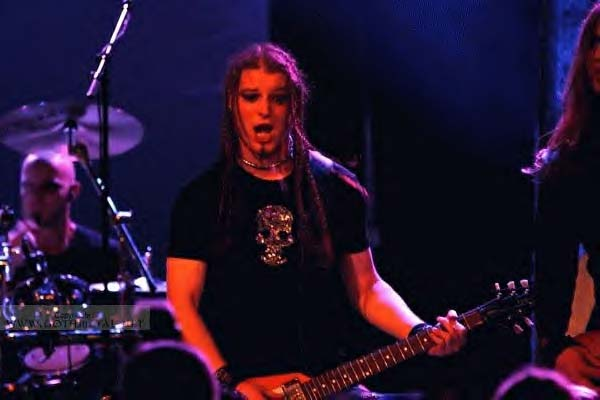
Stefan Gemballa and Benjamin Buss (2004)

=== Final lineup ===
- Helen Vogt – vocals (2003–2014)
- Benjamin Buss – guitars, programming, keyboards (1994–2014)
- David Vogt – bass guitar (2007–2014)
- Stefan Gemballa – drums (2002–2014)

=== Former members ===
- Lena Fischer – keyboards (1994–1995)
- Björn Lorson – guitar (1994–1995) (deceased)
- Manfred Bersin – vocals (1994–1998); guitar (1996–1999)
- Christian Zimmer – drums (1994–1997) (deceased)
- Stefanie Duchêne – vocals (1998–2003)
- Eric Hilt – drums (1998–2000)
- Mike Voltz – keyboards (2000)
- Frédéric Lesny – bass (1994–2007)

== Discography ==
=== As Flowing Tears & Withered Flowers ===
- Bijou (demo; 1995)
- Swansongs (1996)
- Joy Parade (1998)
- Swallow (EP; 1999)

=== As Flowing Tears ===
- Jade (2000)
- Serpentine (2002)
- Razorbliss (2004)
- Invanity – Live in Berlin (2007)
- Thy Kingdom Gone (2008)
