= Lupus Dei =

Studio album by Powerwolf
- Released: 7 May 2007
- Recorded: January 2007
- Studio: SU2 Studio in Illingen, Germany
- Genre: Power metal; heavy metal
- Length: 43:31
- Language: English; Latin
- Label: Metal Blade Records (Europe)
- Producer: Fredrik Nordström

Powerwolf studio album chronology
Return in Bloodred (2005)	Lupus Dei (2007)	Bible of the Beast (2009)

Singles from Lupus Dei
- 1. "In Blood We Trust" Released: 2007

Professional ratings
Review scores
Source	Rating
Metal.de	8/10 stars
Musikreviews.de	11/15 stars

Lupus Dei (Latin for Wolf of God) is the second studio album by German power metal band Powerwolf. In addition to recording at Woodhouse Studios, Germany, the band recorded some parts of the album in the 12th-century Deutschherrenkapelle chapel in Saarbrücken. The band also used a 30-piece choir on the songs "In Blood We Trust" and "Lupus Dei". In a May 2007 interview with Lords of Metal, Matthew Greywolf talked about the story in Lupus Dei:

Well, generally 'Lupus Dei' is focussed on parables taken out of the Bible and set in context to our passion for metal. Finally it had turned out being a real concept album with the wolf himself as the protagonist. In the Introduction to the album he loses faith in good and descends to the evil. He doesn't believe in anything but blood anymore ("In blood we trust") – but during the album he realizes the light of God step by step and finally in the title track he experiences God.

The title of the album may be a reference to the story of Thiess of Kaltenbrun, a Livonian man who lived in Jürgensburg, Swedish Livonia, in 1692 and publicly admitted being a werewolf, referring to himself as "The Hound of God", boldly claiming that he and other werewolves went to Hell to fight the Devil.

== Track listing ==
All tracks are written by Matthew Greywolf, Charles Greywolf, Attila Dorn, Falk Maria Schlegel and Stéfane Funèbre

No.	Title	Length
1.	"Lupus Daemonis (Intro)"	1:17
2.	"We Take It from the Living"	4:04
3.	"Prayer in the Dark"	4:20
4.	"Saturday Satan"	5:18
5.	"In Blood We Trust"	3:03
6.	"Behind the Leathermask"	4:35
7.	"Vampires Don't Die"	3:09
8.	"When the Moon Shines Red"	4:25
9.	"Mother Mary Is a Bird of Prey"	3:16
10.	"Tiger of Sabrod"	3:53
11.	"Lupus Dei"	6:08
Total length:		43:31

The History of Heresy I (2014 bonus tracks)
No.	Title	Length
12.	"We Take It from the Living (Live)"	4:03
13.	"Prayer in the Dark (Live)"	4:31
14.	"Saturday Satan (Live)"	5:34
15.	"In Blood We Trust (Live)"	3:06
16.	"Mother Mary Is a Bird of Prey (Live)"	3:15
17.	"Lupus Dei (Live)"	6:21
Total length:		70:16

The Lupus Dei Demos (15th Anniversary Edition bonus tracks)
No.	Title	Length
12.	"Lupus Daemonis (Demo)"	1:33
13.	"We Take It from the Living (Demo)"	4:02
14.	"Saturday Satan (Demo)"	4:56
15.	"Behind the Leathermask (Demo)"	4:26
16.	"Vampires Don't Die (Demo)"	3:05
17.	"Tiger of Sabrod (Demo)"	3:58
Total length:		64:11

== Personnel ==
Powerwolf

- Attila Dorn – vocals
- Matthew Greywolf – lead and rhythm guitar
- Charles Greywolf – bass, rhythm guitar
- Stéfane Funèbre – drums, percussion
- Falk Maria Schlegel – organ, keyboards

Additional musicians

- Marcel Sude – spoken words
- Reverend Morschett – spoken words

Technical personnel

- Fredrik Nordström – engineer, mixer
- Patrik Jerksten – engineer
- David Buballa – engineer, orchestra conductor
- Francesco Cottone – choir conductor
- Peter In de Betou – mastering
- Phil Hillen – engineer

Other personnel

- Manuela Meyer – photography
- Matthew Greywolf – art concept, layout
- Niklas Sundin – cover art

== See also ==
Tiger of Sabrodt
