= Thy Kingdom Gone =

Studio album by Flowing Tears
- Released: 20 October 2008
- Studio: Kohlekeller Studio, Seeheim-Jugenheim
- Genre: Gothic metal
- Length: 48:22
- Label: Ascendance Records
- Producer: Benjamin Buss

Flowing Tears chronology
| Invanity – Live in Berlin (2007) | Thy Kingdom Gone (2008) |

Professional ratings
Review scores
| Source | Rating |
|---|---|
| BW&BK | (7/10) |
| Lords of Metal | (89/100) |
| Metal 1 | (9.5/10) |

Thy Kingdom Gone is a concept album and the sixth full-length album by the German gothic metal band Flowing Tears. The cover art was made by Seth Siro Anton, who has previously worked with bands such as Moonspell, Soilwork, and Paradise Lost. The song "Thy Kingdom Gone" features male vocals of Vorph from Samael.

== Track listing ==
All tracks are written by Benjamin Buss, Helen Vogt, David Vogt and Stefan Gemballa

Thy Kingdom Gone track listing
| No. | Title | Length |
|---|---|---|
| 1. | "Orchidfire" | 4:07 |
| 2. | "Pain Has Taken Over" | 5:16 |
| 3. | "Rain of a Thousand Years" | 4:29 |
| 4. | "Grey" | 4:47 |
| 5. | "Thy Kingdom Gone" | 4:22 |
| 6. | "Words Before You Leave" | 3:50 |
| 7. | "Miss Fortune" | 5:22 |
| 8. | "Colossal Shaped Despair" | 5:32 |
| 9. | "Kismet" | 4:16 |
| 10. | "For My Enemies" | 3:48 |
| 11. | "Souls of the Neon Reign" | 4:12 |
| 12. | "The War We Left Behind" | 4:32 |
| Total length: | | 48:22 |

== Personnel ==
Flowing Tears

- Helen Vogt – vocals
- Benjamin Buss – guitars, keyboards
- David Vogt – bass
- Stefan Gemballa – drums, percussion

Additional musicians

- Vorph – vocals (track 5)
- Sascha Blach – vocals (track 11)
- Tom Diener – drums, percussion
- David Buballa – keyboards

Technical personnel

- Benjamin Buss – producer
- David Buballa – producer, engineer
- Kristian Kohlmannslehner – engineer, mixer
- Johi – recording (vocals)

Other personnel

- Seth Siro Anton – artwork, layout
- Manuela Meyer – photography
