= The Sacrament of Sin =

Studio album by Powerwolf
- Released: 20 July 2018
- Recorded: January–March 2018
- Studios: Fascination Street, Örebro, Sweden
- Genres: Power metal; heavy metal; symphonic metal
- Length: 42:42
- Languages: English; Latin; German
- Label: Napalm Records
- Producer: Jens Bogren

Powerwolf studio album chronology
| Blessed & Possessed (2015) | The Sacrament of Sin (2018) | Call of the Wild (2021) |

Singles from The Sacrament of Sin
- 1. "Demons Are a Girl's Best Friend" Released: 25 May 2018; 2. "Midnight Madonna" Released: 25 May 2018; 3. "Fire & Forgive" Released: 22 June 2018; 4. "Incense & Iron" Released: 12 July 2018

The Sacrament of Sin is the seventh studio album by German power metal band Powerwolf, released on 20 July 2018 by Napalm Records. The band wrote it during 2017 and began recording it in January 2018 at the Fascination Street Studios in Örebro, Sweden. It was Jens Bogren's first production work for Powerwolf. Joost van den Broek assisted the band with orchestras. Musically, the album is different than previous recordings. The expression of the organ has changed, the orchestra has been added and unusual elements such as bagpipes or flute and the band recorded a ballad accompanied by the piano for the first time in its history. The main theme of the album from the point of view of lyrics is sin, but it is not a concept album.

The album was rated positively by the critics, highlighting mainly the new elements that Powerwolf put in the music. The album also flourished commercially, ranked first in the German charts, and also ranked in several other countries. In support of the album, the band performed in Europe during 2018 and 2019.

Official videos were released for "Demons Are a Girl's Best Friend", "Fire & Forgive", "Incense & Iron", "Killers with the Cross", "The Sacrament of Sin", "Stossgebet", "Where the Wild Wolves Have Gone" and "Nightside of Siberia".

In September 2018, the album won a German Metal Hammer Award for Best Album.

A limited edition mediabook version also features a second disc named Communio Lupatum, which features Powerwolf songs covered by other artists selected by the band members.

== Background ==
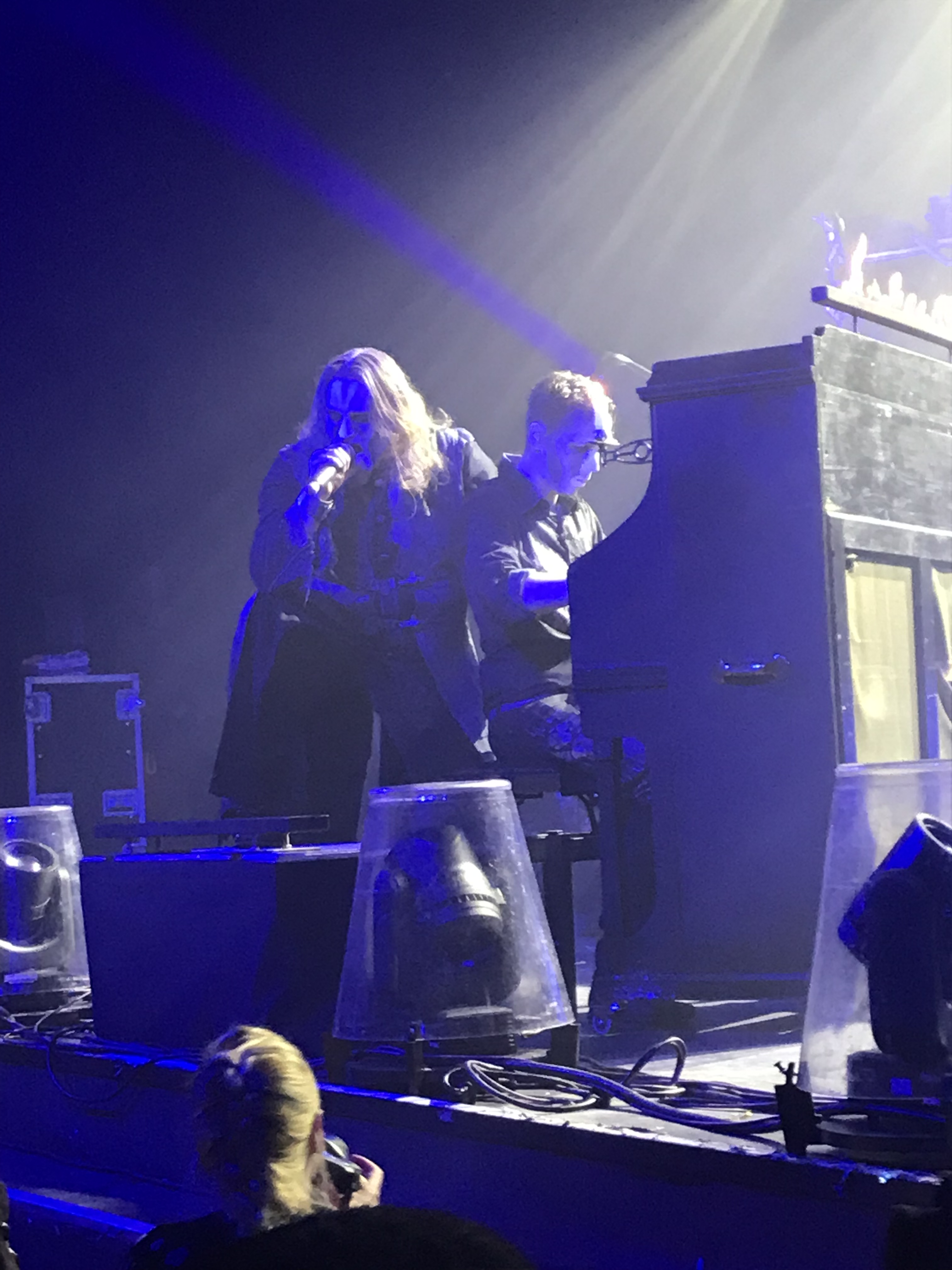
Attila Dorn and Falk Maria Schlegel while performing "Where the Wild Wolves Have Gone"

Powerwolf began working on the seventh studio album after the European tour, which took place in the winter of 2017 until October of the same year. The musical expression of the songs was influenced by the CD Metallum Nostrum, on which the band recorded cover versions of songs by various artists and which was released as a bonus to the previous album Blessed & Possessed (2015). This, according to guitarist Matthew Greywolf, showed the band that "they can play a lot more variations than they did in the past, and it will still sound like Powerwolf." For example, for the first time in history, bagpipes or flute were introduced to the Powerwolf music, a much wider index was used for the organ, and the band also recorded a piano-ballad for the first time in their career. Another major influence on the sound of the album was the replacement of the producer with Jens Bogren.

They began recording the album in January 2018 at the Swedish Fascination Street Studios in Örebro, and the process lasted until March of the same year. The band decided to change the production team because they did not want to stagnate in one place but wanted to move musically. All six of the band's previous albums were recorded with Fredrik Nordström. The collaboration with Bogren was preceded by a discussion of the band's sound, which, according to Greywolf, also helped the group understand themselves. According to Falk Maria Schlegel, the new production benefited the songs, as many instruments were recorded in the studio in one piece, not in parts. As a result, the songs "breathe more". Some of the compositions also feature a large number of orchestrations by Bogren and Joost van den Broek.

The theme of sin appears in some of the songs that deal with "what sin is and how man becomes a sinner." Before the album was released, the group released four singles; "Demons Are a Girl's Best Friend",: Midnight Madonna", "Fire & Forgive", and "Incense & Iron". All of them were first released only in digital form, the first of them later also physically as a special edition available only at the Czech Masters of Rock festival. In this way, the band wanted to thank Czech fans for the gold record they had received for Blessed & Possessed.

== Composition ==
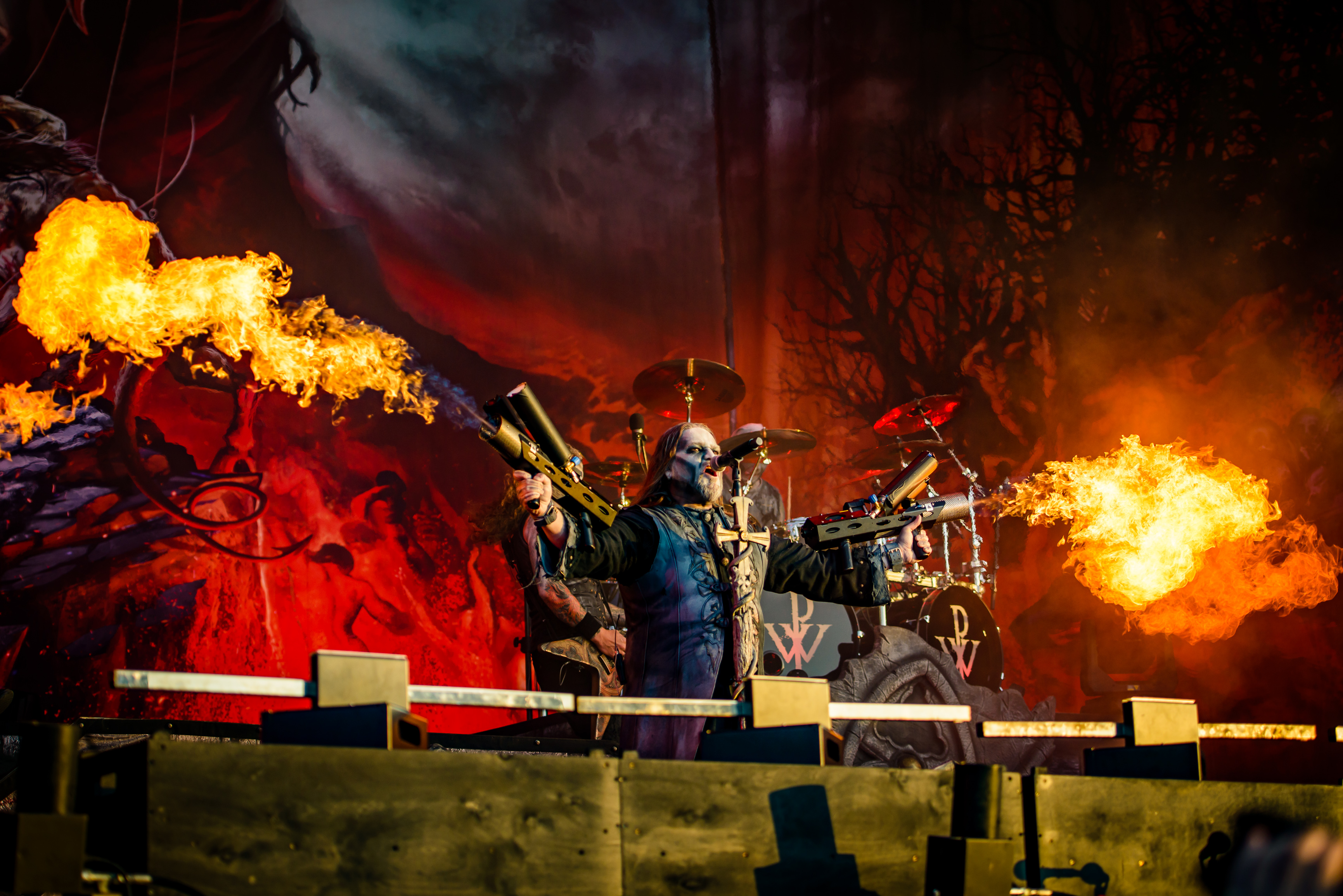
Attila Dorn wearing dual arm mounted flame throwers while performing "Fire & Forgive"

The album features the fast track "Fire & Forgive", which was also released as a single. The text deals with forgiveness. It is followed by the first single, "Demons Are a Girl's Best Friend", which gives preference to organs. The song is textually concerned with temptation and sin. While the first two songs are played by the classic Powerwolf style, the third "Killers with the Cross" is more glorious and Sabaton-like. The text tells of hunting vampires. Positively tuned is also another song "Incense & Iron", which unusually presents bagpipes. This song was released as the third single. This is followed by "Where the Wild Wolves Have Gone", the first ballad in the band's history. While the chorus is accompanied by orchestral elements in addition to guitars; strings and breaths, individual stanzas have piano accompaniment. The first half of the album ends with the song "Stossgebet", which is the second in the history of the band sung in German. The title could be translated into English as "short prayer" and it is in this song that Bogren's work is evident, especially the combination of guitars, strings and organs.

The other half of the album continues with "Nightside of Siberia", which is built on similar guitar riffs to Amon Amarth. Another song is the title "The Sacrament of Sin", which, like the opening "Fire & Forgive", is played in a typical Powerwolf style. The eighth "Venom of Venus" begins with Attila Dorn's classic vocals and is accompanied by speed changes; while the chorus is played faster, the individual stanzas are rather slow. "Nighttime Rebel", the slowest song on the album, features an organ, but guitars are also preferred. In previous albums Powerwolf usually ended with a slower and longer song, but for The Sacrament of Sin they chose the fast and short "Fist by Fist (Sacralize or Strike)" as the final track.

== Release ==
The album was released on 20 July 2018 via Napalm Records. In addition to the basic edition featuring CDs with songs from The Sacrament of Sin, an extended version has also been released with the bonus album Communio Lupatum, featuring remodeled Powerwolf songs by various other artists selected by the band members. These two albums were also released in a limited "Priest Edition" containing in addition to orchestral versions of songs also various complementary gifts, such as a cross or a scarf. In the orders via Napalm Records and the EMP Merchandising music store, the song "Midnight Madonna" was added as a bonus.

The cover of the album was made by the artist Zsofia Danková from Slovakia. The cover depicts a hooded wolf holding a priest and a devil as puppets. According to Matthew Greywolf, this shows that "the role of evil and goodness can be attributed to individual figures with something greater that has the power to control them." After the release of the cover, the Internet began to discuss a possible allusion to the cover of the album The Number of the Beast by Iron Maiden released in 1982, on which the band's mascot Eddie holds the puppet of the devil. According to Danková and Greywolf, this is only a coincidence.

== Promotion ==
=== Wolfsnächte Tour 2018 ===
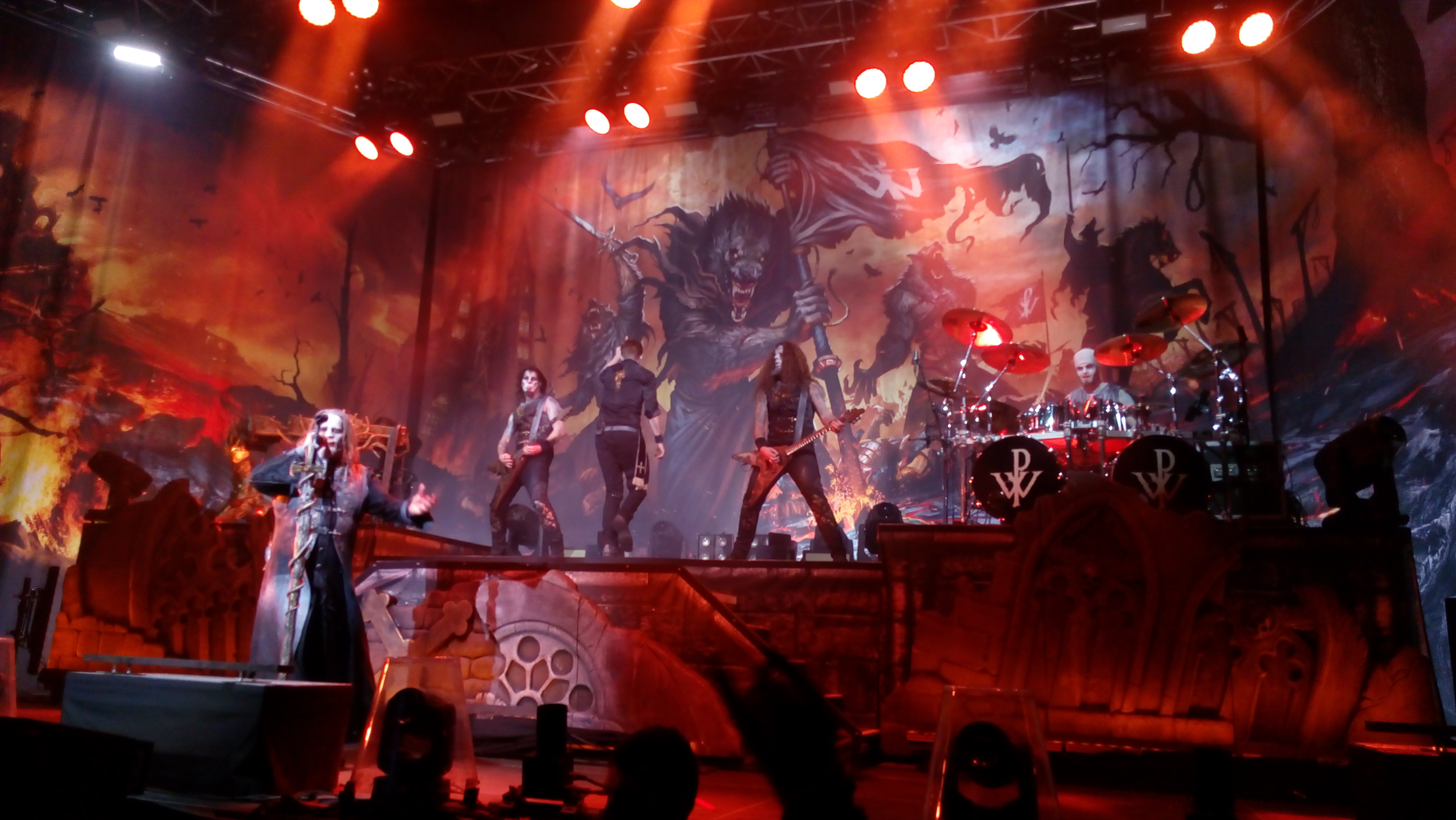
Powerwolf performing in Prague during Wolfsnächte Tour 2018

The band announced their tour supporting The Sacrament of Sin on YouTube on 27 February 2018. Amaranthe and Kissin' Dynamite were selected to serve a series of opening acts for Powerwolf during the tour. The tour was set to begin on 25 October 2018 at the Bataclan theatre in Paris, France. It was set to end on 17 November 2018 at the Saarlandhalle in the band's hometown Saarbrücken.

=== The Sacrament of Sin Tour 2019 ===
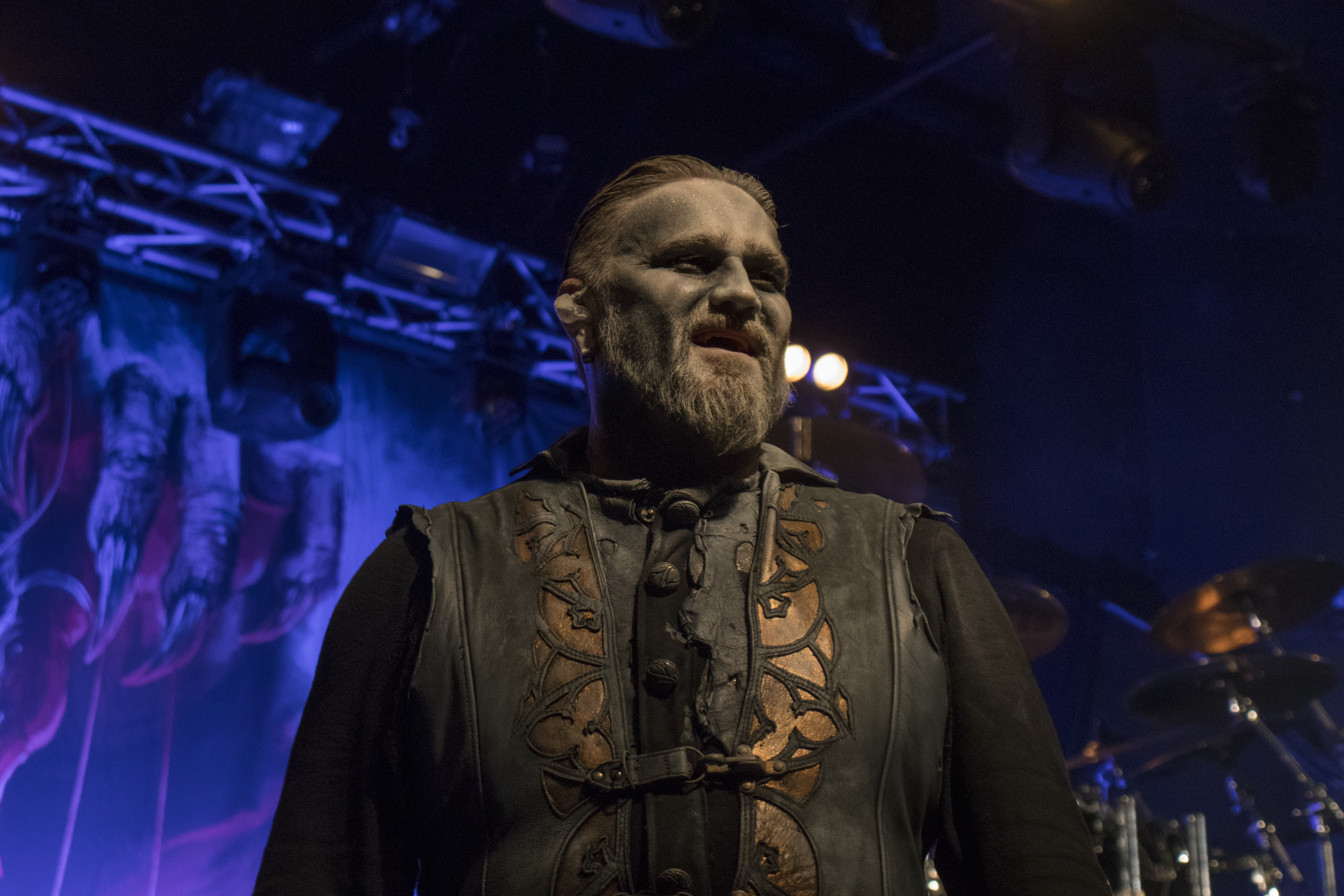
Attila Dorn in Helsinki during The Sacrament of Sin Tour 2019

Their second tour associated with the album was set to begin on 8 November 2019 in Esch-sur-Alzette, Luxembourg and was set to end on 7 December 2019 in Bern, Switzerland. This time, Gloryhammer was selected to serve a series of opening acts for Powerwolf.

=== Latin America 2020 ===
The band engaged in their first tour of South America and Mexico Between February and March 2020 as direct support for Amon Amarth. However, due to the COVID-19 pandemic across Latin America, the remainder of the tour was canceled on 15 March. Of, 15 announced dates, only 12 were played starting in Brasília on 28 February and ending at the Hell & Heaven Metal Fest in Mexico City on 14 March.

== Critical reception ==
Professional ratings
Review scores
| Source | Rating |
|---|---|
| Antyradio | 10/10 stars |
| Bravewords | 8/10 stars |
| Distorted Sound Magazine | 8/10 stars |
| Metal Hammer | 6/7 stars |
| Metal Storm | 8.3/10 stars |
| Metal.de | 8/10 stars |
| MetalWani | 8.8/10 stars |
| Rock 'N' Load | 9/10 stars |
| Sonic Perspectives | 8.5/10 stars |
| Spark Rock Magazine | 4.3/5 stars |

The Metal Hammer noticed "fine details that complement the sound but perfectly match the given idiosyncrasies" and asked "how much change a band would make with such well-defined trademarks. Behind the eternal accusation hides the highest art: Powerwolf develop so inconspicuously in small steps and subtle nuances that it seems as if they have not changed anything, but "just" delivered another great album". Metal.de stated that the band was "mostly faithful to their long-established style", and concluded: "Powerwolf prove with The Sacrament of Sin that they have not lost any of their untameable passion over the years. Album number seven offers eleven sinfully beautiful hymns to all power metal apostles, who sometimes provide with a lot of emotion, sometimes with relentless speed for a varied heavy metal worship".

David Havlena, editor of the Czech magazine Spark, wrote that "The Sacrament of Sin is an album of many faces". He pointed out that it would not hurt if Powerwolf involved more creativity in their work. In the case of The Sacrament of Sin, according to Havlena, they have fulfilled the potential of "about fifty percent". Havlena's colleague Robert Čapek highlighted the ballad "Where the Wild Wolves Have Gone", which, according to him, looks on the album from the perspective of emotions "real". Havlena rated the album with five stars out of six, and Čapek gave half a star more. In the rating of all Spark editors, the album got 4.3 points and placed third in the July album ranking. According to reviewer Mattie Jensen of Metal Wani, The Sacrament of Sin is "exactly what you can expect from Powerwolf, and it's not a bad thing at all." Jensen gave the album 8.8 out of ten.

== Controversies ==
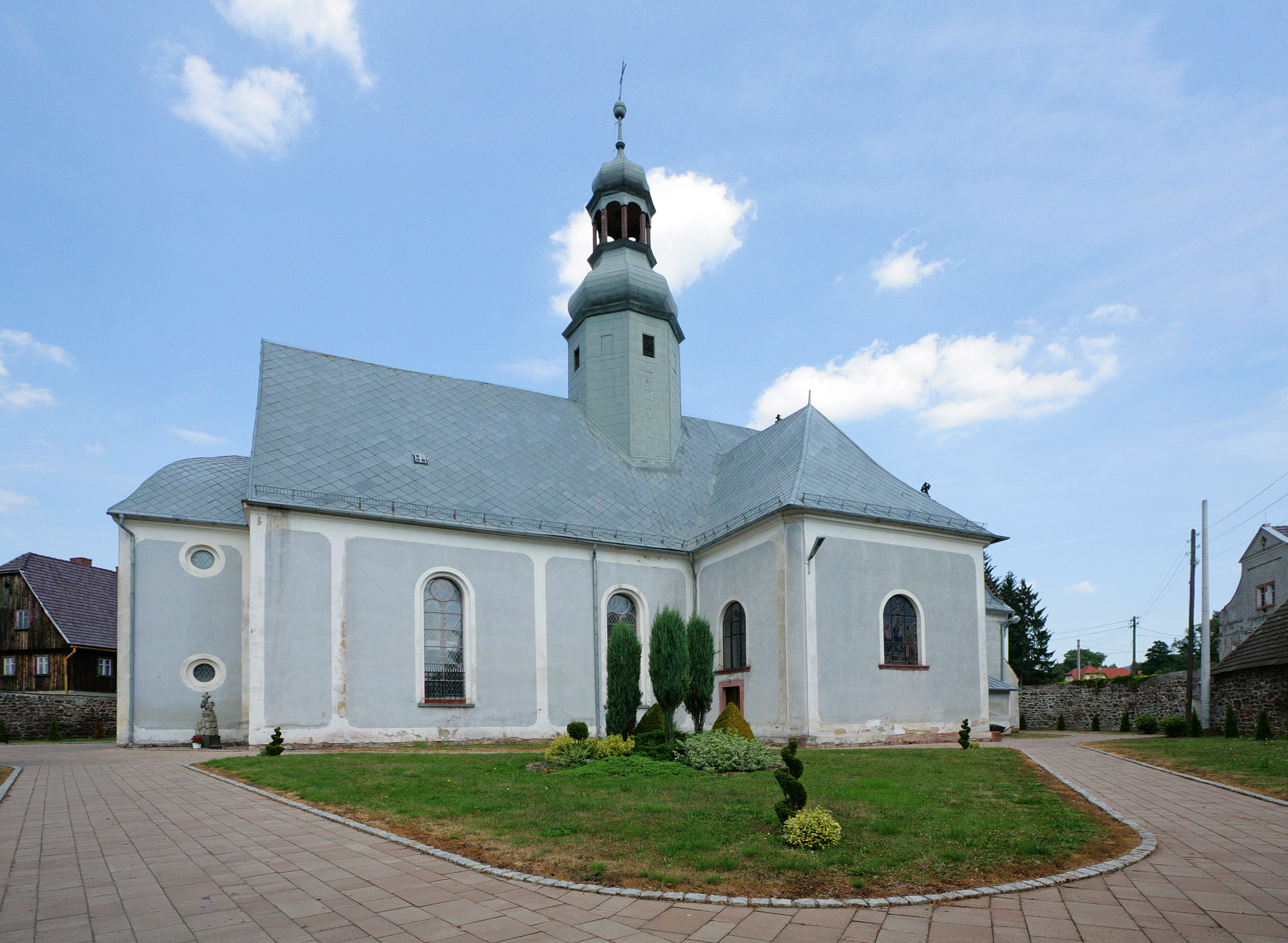
The Church of Saint Mary Magdalene in Ścinawka Średnia, Poland

The music video for "Fire & Forgive" was recorded in the Church of Saint Mary Magdalene in Ścinawka Średnia, Poland. After releasing it on YouTube on 22 June 2018, Powerwolf was accused by the local curia of Świdnica that the video "overstepped limits with regard both to the sacredness of the church as well as to the trust shown by the parish priest in charge of that holy place".

Many Polish newspapers wrote about this controversy. Most of them said that the band is satanic and anti-church.

== Awards and nominations ==
| Year | Ceremony | Award | Result |
|---|---|---|---|
| 2018 | Metal Hammer | Best Album of the Year | Won |

== Track listing ==
All tracks are written by Matthew Greywolf, Charles Greywolf, Attila Dorn, Falk Maria Schlegel and Roel van Helden.

| No. | Title | Length |
|---|---|---|
| 1. | "Fire & Forgive" | 4:30 |
| 2. | "Demons Are a Girl's Best Friend" | 3:38 |
| 3. | "Killers with the Cross" | 4:09 |
| 4. | "Incense & Iron" | 3:57 |
| 5. | "Where the Wild Wolves Have Gone" | 4:13 |
| 6. | "Stossgebet" (Short Prayer) | 3:53 |
| 7. | "Nightside of Siberia" | 3:53 |
| 8. | "The Sacrament of Sin" | 3:26 |
| 9. | "Venom of Venus" | 3:28 |
| 10. | "Nighttime Rebel" | 4:03 |
| 11. | "Fist by Fist (Sacralize or Strike)" | 3:32 |
| Total length: | | 42:42 |

Earbook edition bonus tracks
| No. | Title | Length |
|---|---|---|
| 12. | "Midnight Madonna" | 3:34 |
| Total length: | | 46:16 |

Communio Lupatum
| No. | Title | Artist | Length |
|---|---|---|---|
| 1. | "Sacred & Wild" (Originally released on Preachers of the Night) | Epica | 4:47 |
| 2. | "We Drink Your Blood" (Originally released on Blood of the Saints) | Saltatio Mortis | 3:40 |
| 3. | "Kiss of the Cobra King" (Originally released on Return in Bloodred) | Caliban | 4:17 |
| 4. | "Resurrection by Erection" (Originally released on Bible of the Beast) | Battle Beast | 3:47 |
| 5. | "Night of the Werewolves" (Originally released on Blood of the Saints) | Heaven Shall Burn | 5:15 |
| 6. | "The Evil Made Me Do It" (Originally released on Return in Bloodred) | Kadavar | 5:29 |
| 7. | "Let There Be Night" (Originally released on Blessed & Possessed) | Kissin' Dynamite | 4:16 |
| 8. | "Amen & Attack" (Originally released on Preachers of the Night) | Mille Petrozza with Marc Görtz | 3:56 |
| 9. | "Army of the Night" (Originally released on Blessed & Possessed) | Amaranthe | 3:02 |
| 10. | "When the Saints Are Going Wild" (Originally released on Blood of the Saints) | Eluveitie | 3:44 |
| Total length: | | | 42:13 |

The Symphony of Sin (earbook bonus CD)
| No. | Title | Length |
|---|---|---|
| 1. | "Fire & Forgive" (Orchestral Version) | 4:32 |
| 2. | "Demons Are a Girl's Best Friend" (Orchestral Version) | 3:39 |
| 3. | "Killers with the Cross" (Orchestral Version) | 4:06 |
| 4. | "Incense & Iron" (Orchestral Version) | 3:58 |
| 5. | "Where the Wild Wolves Have Gone" (Orchestral Version) | 4:14 |
| 6. | "Stossgebet" (Orchestral Version) | 3:55 |
| 7. | "Nightside of Siberia" (Orchestral Version) | 3:54 |
| 8. | "The Sacrament of Sin" (Orchestral Version) | 3:29 |
| 9. | "Venom of Venus" (Orchestral Version) | 3:31 |
| 10. | "Nighttime Rebel" (Orchestral Version) | 4:05 |
| 11. | "Fist by Fist (Sacralize or Strike)" (Orchestral Version) | 3:30 |
| 12. | "Midnight Madonna" (Orchestral Version) | 3:30 |
| Total length: | | 46:23 |

== Personnel ==
Powerwolf

- Attila Dorn – vocals
- Matthew Greywolf – lead and rhythm guitar
- Charles Greywolf – bass, rhythm guitar
- Roel van Helden – drums, percussion
- Falk Maria Schlegel – organ, keyboards

Additional musicians

- Dianne van Giersbergen – vocals (additional)
- Marcela Bovio – vocals (additional)
- John "Jaycee" Cuijpers – vocals (additional)
- Jacobus van Bakel – vocals (additional)
- Dirk Bersweiler – vocals (choir, additional)
- James Boyle – vocals (choir, additional)
- Manfred Flick – vocals (choir, additional)
- Titan Fox – vocals (choir, additional)
- Tom Kurt Germann – vocals (choir, additional)
- Björn Hacket – vocals (choir, additional)
- Daniel Herzmann – vocals (choir, additional)
- Toni Hilbert – vocals (choir, additional)
- Fritz Körber – vocals (choir, additional)
- Dirk Reichel – vocals (choir, additional)
- PA'dam Chamber Choir – vocals (choir)

Technical personnel

- Jens Bogren – producer, mixer, recording, engineer
- David Buballa – recording, editing
- Joost van den Broek – arrangements (orchestral, choir), recording (choir), programming, score (choir)
- Maria van Nieukerken – PA'dam Chamber Choir conductor
- Tony Lindgren – mastering
- Jos Driessen – engineer (choir)
- Linus Corneliusson – mixer, editing

Other personnel

- Zsofia Dankova – cover art, illustrations
- Matthew Greywolf – layout
- Tim Tronckoe – photography
- Matteo Vdiva – photography

== Charts ==
=== Weekly charts ===
| Chart (2018) | Peak position |
|---|---|
| Austrian Albums (Ö3 Austria) | 9 |
| Belgian Albums (Ultratop Flanders) | 8 |
| Belgian Albums (Ultratop Wallonia) | 16 |
| Czech Albums (ČNS IFPI) | 17 |
| Dutch Albums (Album Top 100) | 94 |
| Finnish Albums (Suomen virallinen lista) | 16 |
| German Albums (Offizielle Top 100) | 1 |
| Hungarian Albums (MAHASZ) | 17 |
| Polish Albums (ZPAV) | 34 |
| Scottish Albums (Official Charts) | 44 |
| Spanish Albums (PROMUSICAE) | 97 |
| Swiss Albums (Schweizer Hitparade) | 4 |
| US Top Album Sales (Billboard) | 61 |
| US Heatseekers Albums (Billboard) | 3 |
| US Independent Albums (Billboard) | 11 |

=== Year-end charts ===
| Chart (2018) | Position |
|---|---|
| German Albums (Offizielle Top 100) | 57 |

== Release history ==
| Region | Date | Format | Label | Edition(s) | Catalog | Ref. |
|---|---|---|---|---|---|---|
| United States & Europe | 20 July 2018 | CD | Napalm Records | Standard | NPR 783 JC | |
| Germany, Austria, Switzerland | 20 July 2018 | CD | Napalm Records | Standard | NPR 783 JC | |
| Austria | 20 July 2018 | CD, LP | Napalm Records | Deluxe | NPR 783 DELUXE | |
| Europe | 20 July 2018 | CD, LP | Napalm Records | Deluxe | NPR 783 DELUXE | |
| Germany | 20 July 2018 | CD | Napalm Records | Limited | NPR 783 MSG | |
| Russia | 20 July 2018 | CD | Soyuz Music | Standard | SZCD 9991-18 | |
| Japan | 20 July 2018 | CD | Chaos Reigns; Ward Records | Standard | GQCS-90607 | |
| Japan | 20 July 2018 | CD | Chaos Reigns; Ward Records | Limited | GQCS-90605~6 | |
| Austria | 20 July 2018 | CD | Napalm Records | Deluxe | NPR 783 EB | |
| Europe | 20 July 2018 | CD | Napalm Records | Limited | NPR 783 SC | |
| United States & Europe | 20 July 2018 | CD | Napalm Records | Standard | NPR 783 | |
| Germany | 20 July 2018 | Cassette | Napalm Records | Limited | NPR 783 MC | |
| United States & Europe | 20 July 2018 | LP | Napalm Records | Standard | NPR 783 VINYL | |
| Austria | 20 July 2018 | LP | Napalm Records | Limited | NPR 783 VINYL | |
| Germany | 20 July 2018 | LP | Napalm Records | Limited | NPR 783 VINYL | |
| Germany | 13 April 2019 | LP | Napalm Records | Standard | NPR 783 PIC | |
