= Serpentine (Flowing Tears album) =

Studio album by Flowing Tears
- Released: 21 January 2002
- Genre: Gothic metal
- Length: 42:46
- Label: Century Media Records
- Producer: Waldemar Sorychta

Flowing Tears chronology
Jade (2000)	Serpentine (2002)	Razorbliss (2004)

Professional ratings
Review scores
Source	Rating
AllMusic	4.5/5 stars

Serpentine is the fourth album by the German gothic metal band Flowing Tears, the second under the moniker Flowing Tears. This album would also be the last album to include Stefanie Duchêne on lead vocals, as she had to leave the band in 2004 to tend to her pregnancy at the time.

== Track listing ==
No.	Title	Length
1.	"Intro"	1:14
2.	"Starfish Ride (For a Million Dollar Handshake)"	4:20
3.	"Serpentine"	3:51
4.	"Children of the Sun"	4:01
5.	"The Marching Sane"	3:16
6.	"Breach"	5:24
7.	"Portsall (Departure Song)"	3:12
8.	"Justine"	3:40
9.	"The Carnage People"	3:01
10.	"Merlin"	3:23
11.	"Cupid of the Carrion Kind"	3:33
12.	"For Tonight"	3:51
Total length:		42:46

== Personnel ==
- Stefanie Duchêne – vocals
- Benjamin Buss – guitars, programming
- Frederic Lesny – bass guitar
- Stefan Gemballa – drums
