= Flesh for Fantasy (album) =

Studio album by Red Aim
- Released: 6 May 2002
- Genre: Stoner rock; raga rock; heavy metal; punk rock; hard rock
- Length: 50:01
- Label: Metal Blade Records

Red Aim chronology
Saartanic Cluttydogs (2001)	Flesh for Fantasy (2002)	Niagara (2003)

Professional ratings
Review scores
Source	Rating
Metal.de	9/10 stars

Flesh for Fantasy is the third studio album by the German stoner rock band Red Aim, released on 6 May 2002 by Metal Blade Records.

== Track listing ==
All tracks are written by B.B. Foxworth, El Davide, Dr. Don Rogers, Ray Kitzler and Mitch Buchanan.

No.	Title	Length
1.	"The Golden Nonstop"	4:09
2.	"El Gonzo Mondial"	3:36
3.	"My Lovely Mr. Singingclub"	4:15
4.	"Highway Crucifix"	4:47
5.	"Aroma"	2:50
6.	"Goodbye Sam. Hello Samantha"	3:50
7.	"Snokeshooter"	3:07
8.	"Tombola"	4:18
9.	"Kneel Down and Blow for Forgiveness"	4:05
10.	"Rock You Like a Hurricane" (Scorpions cover)	4:15
11.	"Aprilfuckers"	10:54
Total length:		50:01

== Personnel ==
- Dr. Don Rogers – vocals
- B.B. Foxworth – guitar, hammond organ
- El Davide – bass guitar
- Mitch Buchanan – drums, percussion
