= Razorbliss =

Studio album by Flowing Tears
- Released: 22 March 2004
- Genre: Gothic metal
- Length: 44:48
- Label: Century Media
- Producer: Waldemar Sorychta

Flowing Tears chronology
| Serpentine (2002) | Razorbliss (2004) | Invanity – Live in Berlin (2007) |

Professional ratings
Review scores
| Source | Rating |
|---|---|
| AllMusic | 4/5 stars |
| Scream Magazine | 4/6 stars |

Razorbliss is the fifth studio album by German gothic metal band Flowing Tears, the third under the moniker of Flowing Tears. It is the band's first album with vocalist Helen Vogt.

== Track listing ==
| No. | Title | Length |
|---|---|---|
| 1. | "Razorbliss" | 3:18 |
| 2. | "Believe" | 3:49 |
| 3. | "Virago" | 3:58 |
| 4. | "Undying" | 3:44 |
| 5. | "Radium Angel" | 3:32 |
| 6. | "Firedream" | 3:35 |
| 7. | "Ballad of a Lonely God" | 3:35 |
| 8. | "Snakes of Grey" | 3:33 |
| 9. | "Mine is the Ocean" | 3:46 |
| 10. | "Maladine" | 3:11 |
| 11. | "Unspoken" | 3:57 |
| 12. | "Pitch Black Water" | 4:54 |
| Total length: | | 44:48 |

== Lineup ==
- Helen Vogt – vocals
- Benjamin Buss – guitars, keyboards, programming
- Frederic Lesny – bass
- Stefan Gemballa – drums
