= Niagara (album) =

Studio album by Red Aim
- Released: 20 October 2003
- Recorded: 2003
- Genres: Stoner rock; raga rock; heavy metal; punk rock; hard rock
- Length: 49:16
- Label: Metal Blade Records

Red Aim chronology
Flesh for Fantasy (2002)	Niagara (2003)

Professional ratings
Review scores
Source	Rating
Metal.de	7/10 stars
Rock Hard	8.5/10 stars
Rate Your Music	3.51/5 stars
Scream Magazine	3/6 stars

Niagara is the fourth studio album by the German stoner rock band Red Aim, released on 20 October 2003 by Metal Blade Records.

== Track listing ==
All tracks are written by B.B. Foxworth, El Davide, Dr. Don Rogers, Ray Kitzler and Mitch Buchanan.

No.	Title	Length
1.	"Saputra"	0:17
2.	"Salamander"	3:59
3.	"Almost Night Train"	3:30
4.	"Ghost of Beluga"	3:02
5.	"The Stupidity of Going East"	3:51
6.	"Sisal Sister"	4:45
7.	"The Invisible Ray"	2:06
8.	"Niagara"	3:31
9.	"Hard 16"	3:22
10.	"Matula"	2:33
11.	"Matador"	3:54
12.	"Rivolta"	1:41
13.	"Parachute"	4:07
14.	"Crying Is Blackmail"	4:24
15.	"Burnout in Israel"	4:05
Total length:		49:16
