= Jade (Flowing Tears album) =

Studio album by Flowing Tears
- Released: 17 February 2000
- Recorded: Woodhouse Studios
- Genre: Gothic metal
- Length: 44:44
- Label: Century Media
- Producer: Waldemar Sorychta

Flowing Tears chronology
Swallow (EP) (1999)	Jade (2000)	Serpentine (2002)

Jade is the third album by the German gothic metal band Flowing Tears. It is their first album after changing their name from Flowing Tears & Withered Flowers.

== Track listing ==
No.	Title	Length
1.	"Godless"	3:25
2.	"Sistersun"	4:12
3.	"Swallow"	4:27
4.	"Lovesong for a Dead Child"	5:49
5.	"Under the Red"	4:54
6.	"Turpentine"	1:51
7.	"The One I Drowned"	5:18
8.	"Vanity"	1:30
9.	"Radio Heroine"	3:37
10.	"Coma Garden"	2:29
11.	"Jade"	3:32
12.	"White Horses"	3:36
Total length:		44:44

== Line-up ==
- Stefanie Duchêne – vocals
- Benjamin Buss – guitars, programming
- Manfred Bersin – guitars
- Frederic Lesny – bass
- Mike Volz – keyboards
- Eric Hilt – drums
