= Return in Bloodred =

Studio album by Powerwolf
- Released: 4 April 2005
- Recorded: September 2004
- Studio: Studio Fredman, Gothenburg, Sweden
- Genre: Power metal; heavy metal
- Length: 40:02
- Label: Metal Blade Records (Europe)
- Producer: Fredrik Nordström

Powerwolf studio album chronology
Return in Bloodred (2005)	Lupus Dei (2007)

Return in Bloodred is the debut studio album by German power metal band Powerwolf, released in 2005.

== History ==
First songs for the album, such as "Mr. Sinister" and "We Came to Take Your Souls", which were completed in the first session, were written in June 2004.

The album was recorded within eight days in September 2004 at Studio Fredman. The drummer Stéfane Funèbre had to be temporarily replaced by Tom Diener during the recording due to a tendonitis.

The album was re-released in 2014 as part of the box set The History of Heresy I along with the album Lupus Dei and a DVD of a performance at the Wacken Open Air 2008.

== Themes ==
"Mr. Sinister" was the first song Powerwolf had ever written; this served as a guide for the style they appropriated. The text is about Vlad II Dracul, the father of Dracula.

"We Came to Take Your Souls" tells about a war between Romania and the Ottoman Empire under Vlad III Dracula.

"Kiss of the Cobra King" tells a story about a wolf, which fights against a snake. The story is about the war between Romania and the Ottoman Empire that was already being dealt with in We Came to Take Your Souls. According to older interviews, this is an old Romanian legend; the biography of The History of Heresy I, on the other hand, claims that the idea arose during a rehearsal session when Attila Dorn ordered a pop-up pop group to be quiet, otherwise they would be "bitten by the Cobra King."

"Demons & Diamonds" criticizes the impact of the pursuit of power and wealth.

"Montecore" is about the white tiger, who in 2003 had seriously injured the magician Roy Horn.

"The Evil Made Me Do It" and "Lucifer in Starlight" have strong influences of doom metal and are a tribute to Black Sabbath. "Lucifer in Starlight" deals with the fascination for the devil.

"Son of the Morning Star" does not include guitar, drums or bass unlike the rest of the album. In addition to Attila's singing only organ sounds are used. Lyrically, the song describes the biblical apocalypse.

== Track listing ==
All tracks are written by Matthew Greywolf, Charles Greywolf, Attila Dorn, Falk Maria Schlegel and Stéfane Funèbre.

No.	Title	Length
1.	"Mr. Sinister"	4:39
2.	"We Came to Take Your Souls"	4:01
3.	"Kiss of the Cobra King"	4:32
4.	"Black Mass Hysteria"	4:12
5.	"Demons & Diamonds"	3:39
6.	"Montecore"	5:19
7.	"The Evil Made Me Do It"	3:39
8.	"Lucifer in Starlight"	4:49
9.	"Son of the Morning Star"	5:12
Total length:		40:02

The History of Heresy I (2014 bonus tracks)
No.	Title	Length
10.	"Mr. Sinister (Live)"	5:38
11.	"We Came to Take Your Souls (Live)"	4:08
12.	"Kiss of the Cobra King (Live)"	5:26
Total length:		54:02

Note: In the original edition, after the last track, "Son of the Morning Star", there is roughly a minute of silence.

== Personnel ==
Powerwolf

- Attila Dorn – vocals
- Matthew Greywolf – lead and rhythm guitar
- Charles Greywolf – bass, rhythm guitar
- Stéfane Funèbre – drums, percussion
- Falk Maria Schlegel – organ, keyboards

Additional musicians

- Tom Diener – drums, percussion
- Marcel Sude – spoken words
- Mellika Meskine – female vocals (track 9)

Technical personnel

- Fredrik Nordström – engineer, mixer
- Patrik Jerksten – engineer
- David Buballa – engineer, orchestra conductor
- Göran Finnberg – mastering

Other personnel

- Manuela Meyer – photography
- Matthew Greywolf – artwork
