= Wadgassen =

- Municipality
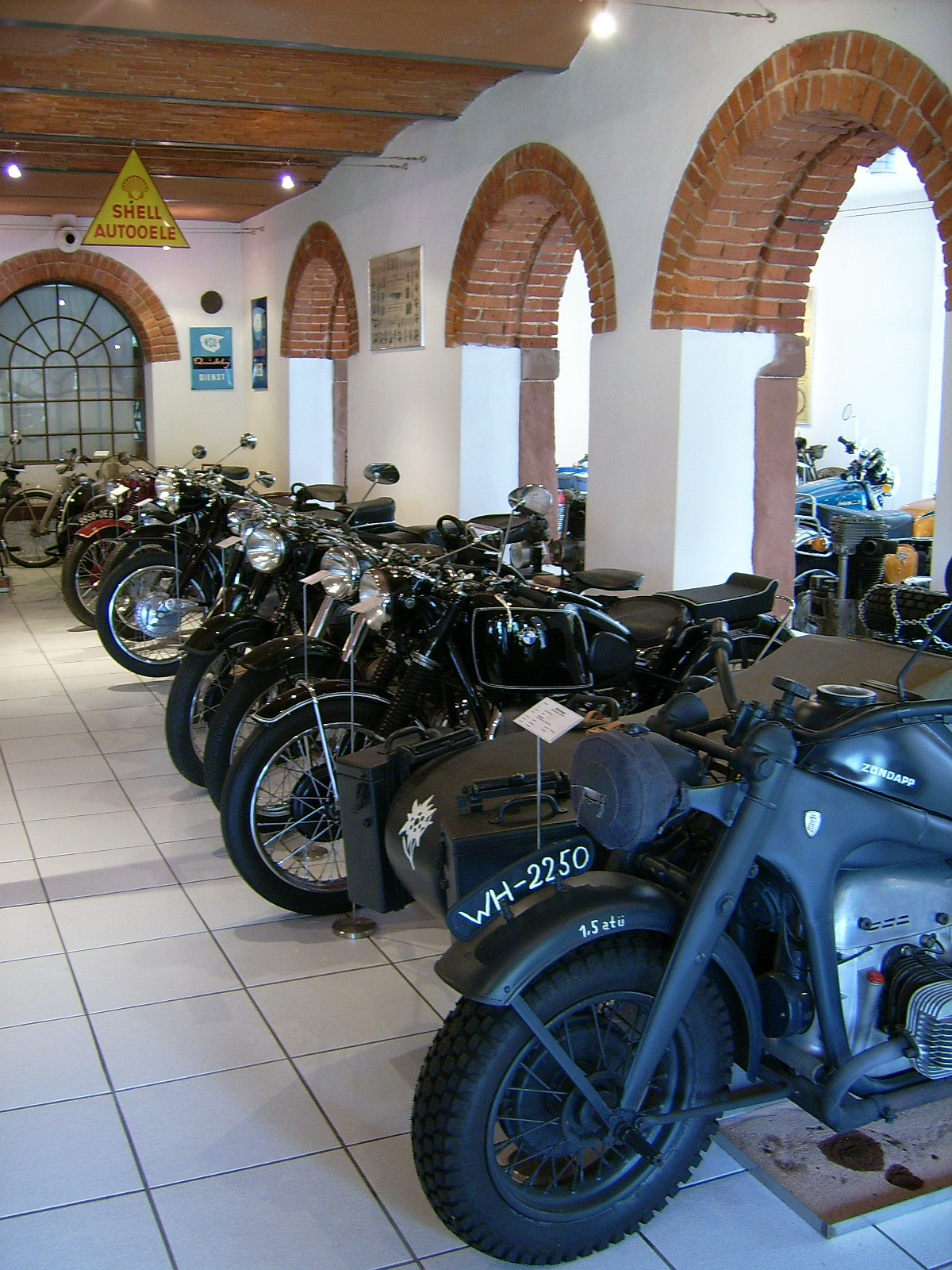
- Zweiradmuseum

- Flag Coat of arms

- Location of Wadgassen within Saarlouis district
- Interactive map of Wadgassen
- Location within Germany Location within Saarland
- Coordinates: 49°16′N 6°46′E
- Country: Germany
- State: Saarland
- District: Saarlouis

Government
  - Mayor (2019–29): Sebastian Greiber (SPD)

Area
  - Total: 25.93 km^{2} (10.01 sq mi)
- Elevation: 187 m (614 ft)

Population (2025-12-31)
  - Total: 17,987
  - Density: 693.7/km^{2} (1,797/sq mi)
- Time zone: UTC+01:00 (CET)
  - Summer (DST): UTC+02:00 (CEST)
- Postal codes: 66787
- Dialling codes: 06834
- Vehicle registration: SLS
- Website: www.wadgassen.de

Wadgassen (German pronunciation: [ˈvaːdˌɡasn̩]) is a municipality in the district of Saarlouis, in Saarland, Germany. It is situated on the river Saar, approximately 6 km (3.7 mi) southeast of Saarlouis, and 15 km (9.3 mi) west of Saarbrücken.

== Religion ==
Between 1135 and 1792 the Premonstratensian Wadgassen Abbey (German: Prämonstratenser-Chorherrenstift Wadgassen) was located here.

== Fusion ==
- 1974: Differten, Friedrichweiler, Hostenbach, Schaffhausen (Saar), Wadgassen (village), Werbeln

== Politics ==
=== Local council ===
Party	2014	2009	2004
CDU	11	12	16
SPD	15	13	14
Linke	2	4	0
FDP	2	2	0
Grüne	2	1	0
FWG	1	1	2
Independent	0	0	1

(as at 24 May 2014)

=== Mayor ===
- From 1 May 2014 – today: Sebastian Greiber
- 1 May 1988 – 30 April 2014: Harald Braun, SPD
- 1974–1988: Dr. Friedrich Mouty, CDU

=== Twin town ===
- Arques (Pas-de-Calais), France, since 1979

== Economy ==
- Glass industry (Villeroy & Boch).
- Mechanical engineering (Firma Koch; since 2007 FL SMIDTH KOCH MVT)
- Startup: Factory-Outlet-Center

=== Museums ===
- Deutsches Zeitungsmuseum (DZM) in the Abteihof (part of the former Premonstratensian abbey)
- Glashütte Museum: Villeroy & Boch
- Museum Academia Wadegotia – local history and living history of Wadgassen: Treppenstrasse 13 (csw Neubau), Wadgassen. Founded as institute museum.
- Saarländisches Zweiradmuseum on the site of the Cristallerie Wadgassen (closed on 30 September 2007)

== Famous people ==
- Daniel Braun, author and journalist
- Johannes Kirschweng, poet
- Matthew Greywolf, guitarist of Powerwolf

== Sources and external links ==
- Official website (in German)
- museum.academia-wadegotia.de (History and living history of Wadgassen) (in German)
