= Attila Dorn =

German heavy metal singer

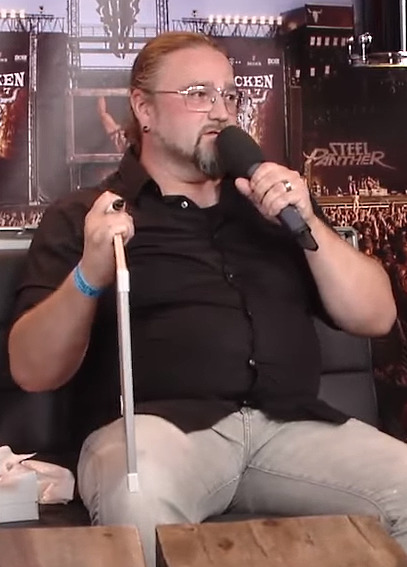
- Attila Dorn in 2015

Background information
- Also known as: Dr. Don Rogers
- Born: Karsten Brill; 27 October 1970 (age 55); Bous, Saarland, West Germany
- Genres: Power metal; heavy metal; symphonic metal; speed metal; doom metal; thrash metal; stoner rock; raga rock; punk rock; grunge; comedy rock
- Occupation: Singer
- Years active: 1991–present

Karsten Brill (pronounced [ˈkarstən ˈbʁɪl]; born 27 October 1970), best known professionally as Attila Dorn, is a German singer. He has been the lead vocalist of the power metal band Powerwolf since 2003.

== Career ==
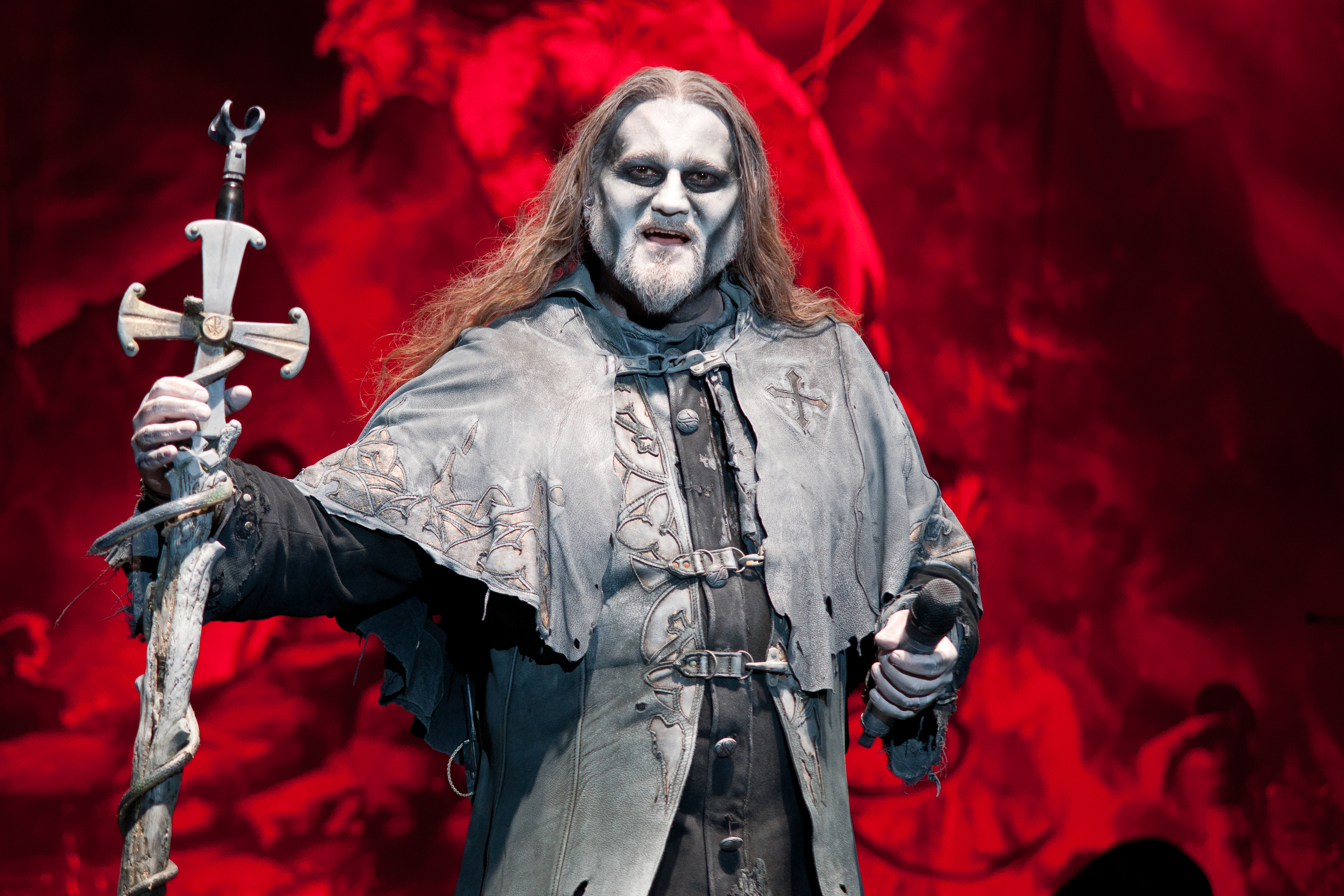
Attila Dorn with Powerwolf at Masters of Rock 2018, Vizovice, Czech Republic

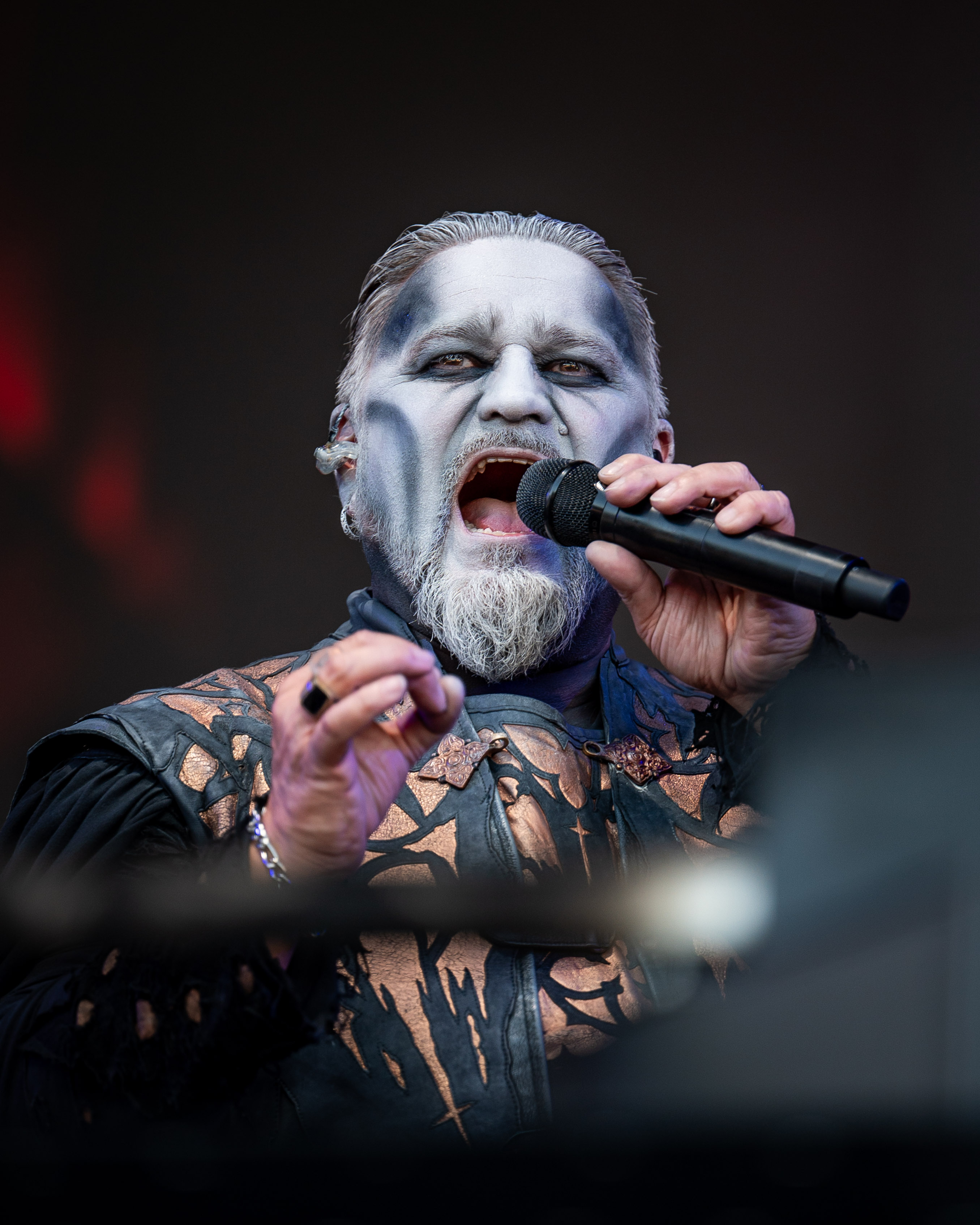
Dorn performing with Powerwolf at Tons of Rock, Oslo Norway, 2025

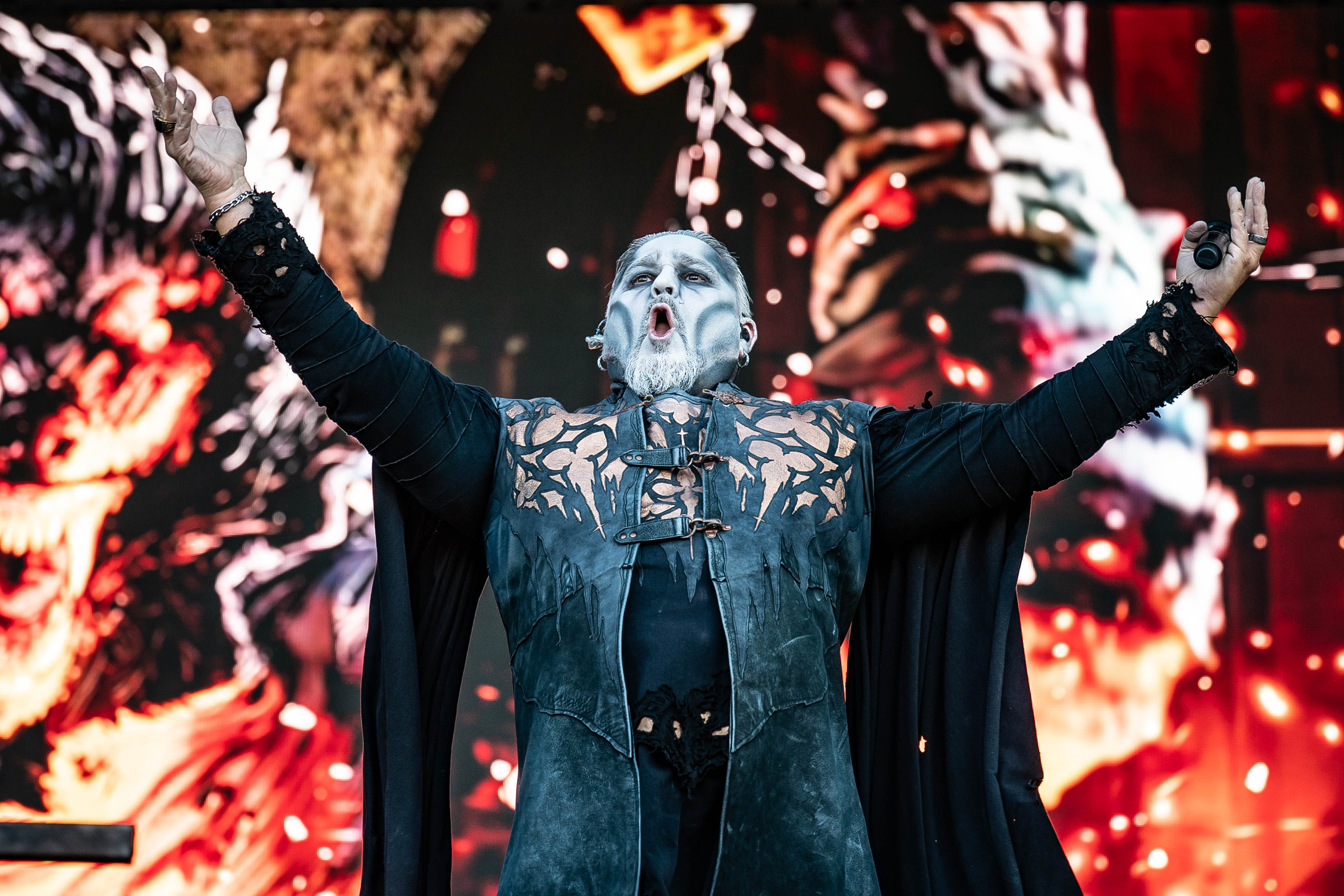
Dorn performing with Powerwolf at Tons of Rock, Oslo Norway, 2025

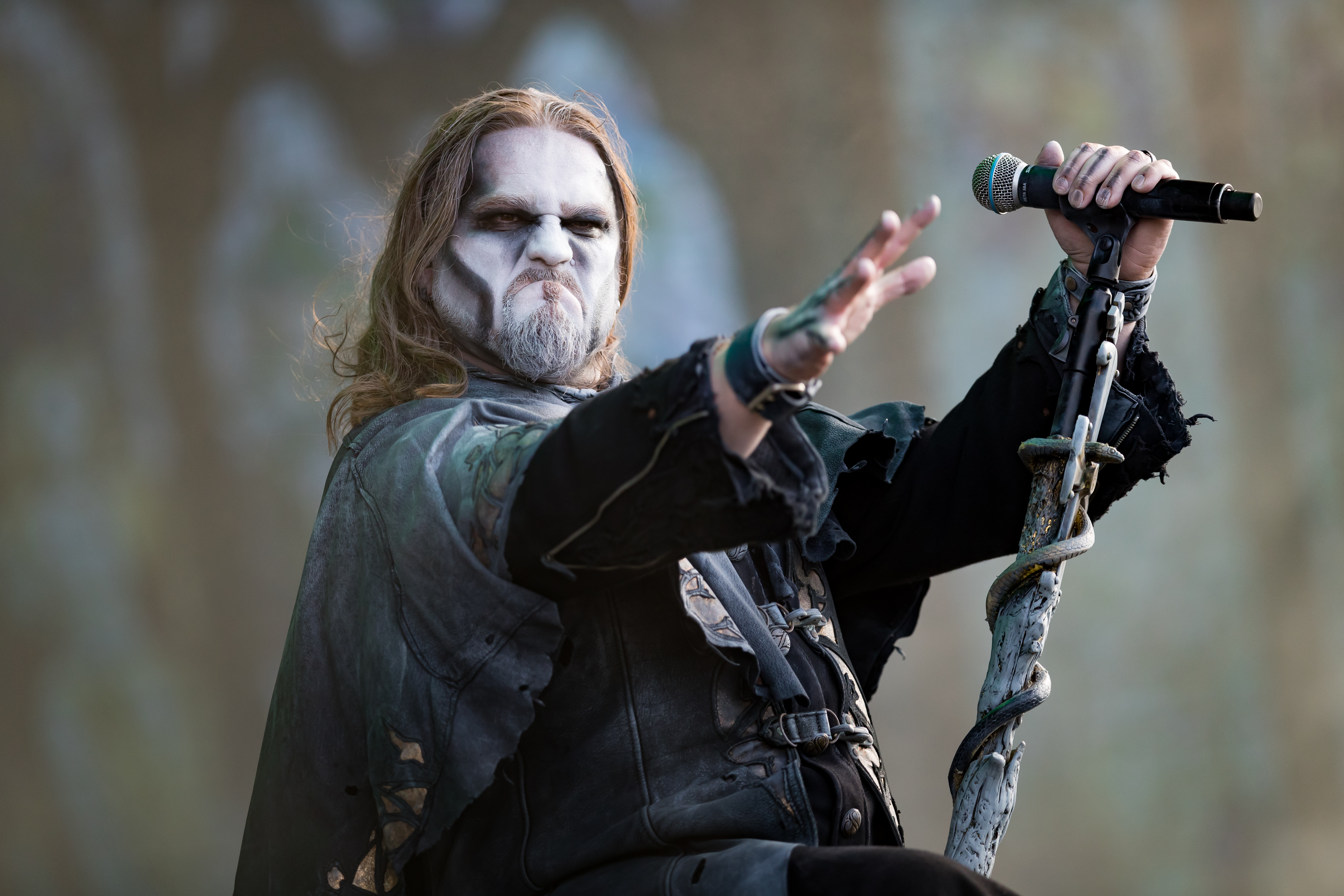
Dorn performing with Powerwolf at Wacken Open Air 2017

=== Dragon's Tongue and Meskalin (1991–1998) ===
In 1991, Brill along with Derek Butsch (drums), Markus Görg (bass), Thorsten Neu (lead guitar) and Stefan Reile (rhythm guitar) created Dragon's Tongue, the first grunge band in Saarland. They quickly earned a very good reputation. They changed their name to Meskalin in 1996. The band was dissolved after the death of Derek Butsch in 1998.

=== Red Aim (1999–2006) ===
Brill joined Red Aim replacing Pascal Flach in 1999 under the stage name Dr. Don Rogers. After he joined the band, their music started to go more into the direction of punk rock and heavy metal. They also re-recorded their first studio album titled Call Me Tiger in 2000 with him.

=== Powerwolf (2003–present) ===
He joined Powerwolf along with other Red Aim members in 2003. Similar to other band members, he decided to take on pseudonym Attila Dorn and build up a backstory around it. According to it, Attila is half Romanian and half Hungarian. Charles and Matthew Greywolf met him in a pub in Sighișoara on their holidays in Romania and invited him to join their band. Soon after that, Attila moved to the Powerwolf's hometown Saarbrücken, and became the frontman of the band.

On 22 October 2005 he performed live in Kaufbeuren with Gamma Ray during their song "Blood Religion".

He was a guest during Sabaton's concert in Oberhausen on 17 September 2011.

In an interview with the Rock Hard magazine in 2013, Matthew Greywolf confirmed that Dorn is not from Romania.

The Neue Osnabrücker Zeitung compared Brill's Attila Dorn character with Count Dracula, the Hannoversche Allgemeine Zeitung described him as a "mix of a monk and a crusader" and Die Welt as a "mix of Hunnic ruler and an Orthodox priest".

== Personal life ==
Karsten Brill was born on 27 October 1970 in Bous (then in West Germany) as a son of Albert Brill.

On 16 May 2015, he married Powerwolf's photographer Jenny Brill.

He currently lives in Saarbrücken.

== Singing style ==
Brill can sing from operatic to belting and raspy vocals like screaming. He is a baritone. He has a vocal range of C_{2}–B♭_{5}.

He received classical vocal training by vocal coach Francesco Cottone in Saarbrücken.

== Discography ==
=== With Powerwolf ===
- Return in Bloodred (2005)
- Lupus Dei (2007)
- Bible of the Beast (2009)
- Blood of the Saints (2011)
- Preachers of the Night (2013)
- Blessed & Possessed (2015)
- The Sacrament of Sin (2018)
- Call of the Wild (2021)
- Interludium (2023)
- Wake Up the Wicked (2024)

=== With Red Aim ===
- Call Me Tiger (2000)
- Saartanic Cluttydogs (2001)
- Flesh for Fantasy (2002)
- Niagara (2003)

=== With Meskalin ===
- Meskalin (1997)

=== With Dragon's Tongue ===
- Fake (1994)
- Love but Lies (1996)
- Bored Beyond Belief (1996)
