= Charles Greywolf =

German musician and record producer

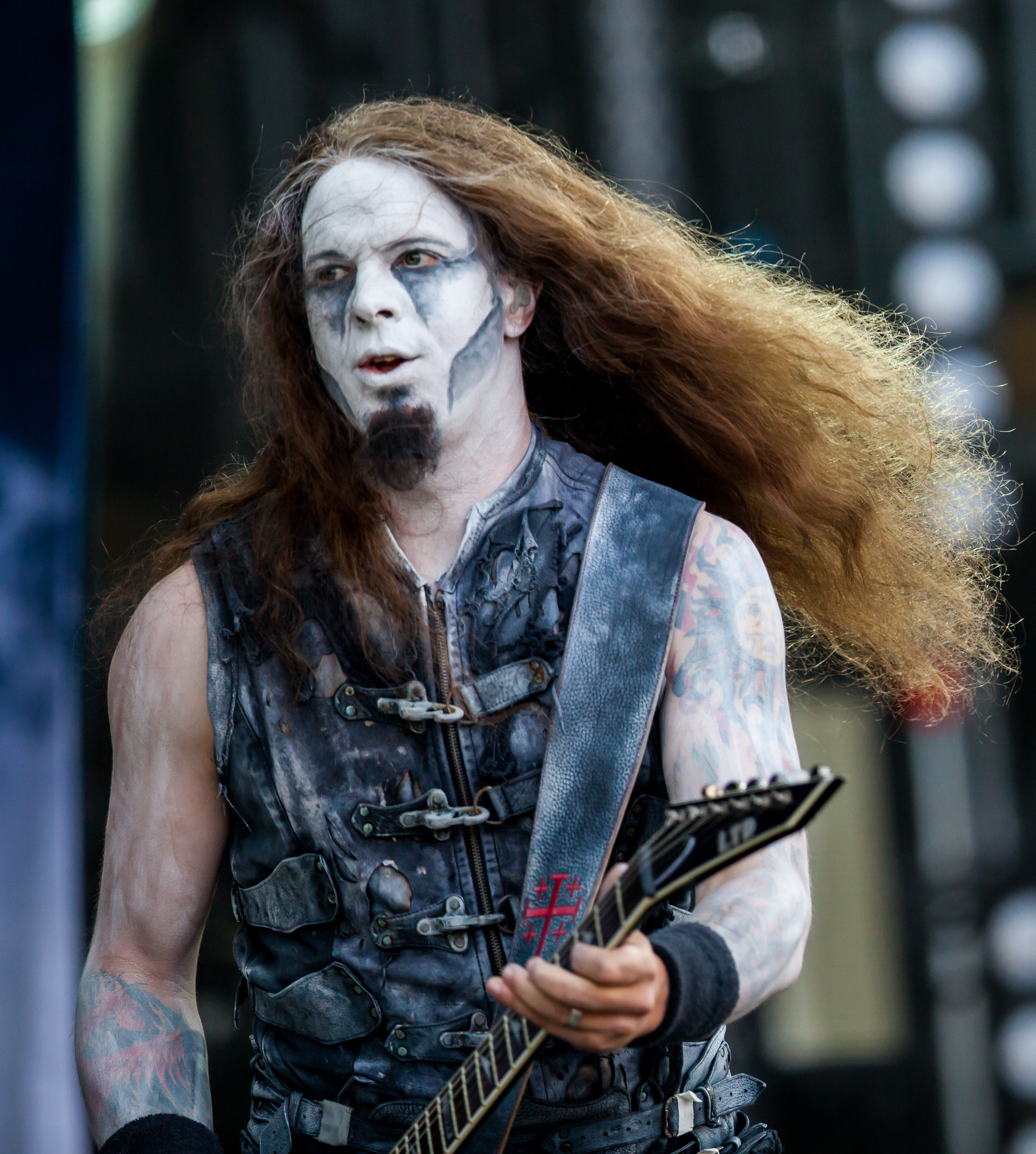
- Greywolf performing with Powerwolf at Wacken Open Air 2015

Background information
- Birth name: David Vogt
- Also known as: Charles Greywolf; El Davide
- Born: 5 September 1975 (age 49); Berus, Saarland, West Germany
- Genres: Heavy metal; power metal; gothic metal; stoner rock; raga rock; punk rock
- Occupations: Musician; record producer
- Instruments: Guitar; bass
- Years active: 2002–present
- Member of: Powerwolf
- Formerly of: Flowing Tears; Red Aim; Heavatar

David Vogt (pronounced [ˈdaːvɪt ˈfoːkt]; born 5 September 1975), best known by his stage name Charles Greywolf, is a German musician, record producer, mixer and recording engineer. He is best known as the rhythm guitarist of the power metal band Powerwolf.

He runs a recording studio in Berus, called "Studio Greywolf". He is married to Helen Vogt, vocalist of Lighthouse in Darkness and formerly from Flowing Tears.

== Career ==
In 2002, David Vogt joined Red Aim as a bassist under a stage name "El Davide". In 2003, along with Benjamin Buss he created Powerwolf. They decided to take on pseudonyms and build up backstories around those (David Vogt – Charles Greywolf, Benjamin Buss – Matthew Greywolf). Soon, they were joined by the rest of Red Aim. He joined Flowing Tears in 2007.

As a record producer he has worked on albums by Autumnblaze, Demon Incarnate, Dying Gorgeous Lies, Gloryful, Godslave, Hammer King, Hatred, InfiNight, Kambrium, Lonewolf, Messenger, No Hope, Noctura, Powerwolf, The Last Supper, Tortuga, Turin Horse, Unchained and Vintundra.

== Associated acts ==
- Red Aim (2002–2006)
- Powerwolf (2003—present)
- Flowing Tears (2007–2014)
- Heavatar (2012–2014)

== Discography ==
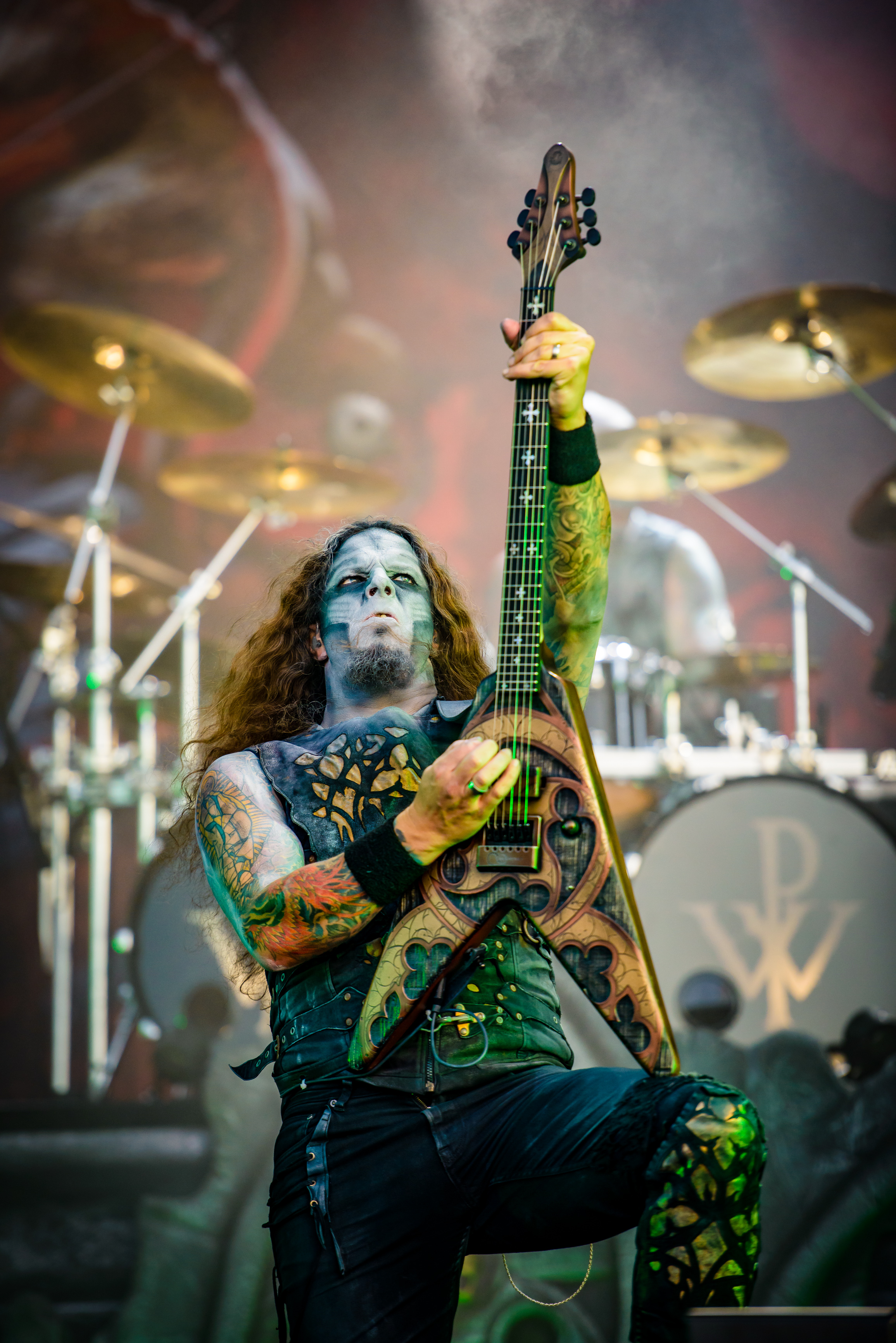
Greywolf at Wacken Open Air 2019

=== With Powerwolf ===
- Return in Bloodred (2005)
- Lupus Dei (2007)
- Bible of the Beast (2009)
- Blood of the Saints (2011)
- Preachers of the Night (2013)
- Blessed & Possessed (2015)
- The Sacrament of Sin (2018)
- Call of the Wild (2021)
- Interludium (2023)
- Wake Up the Wicked (2024)

=== With Flowing Tears ===
- Thy Kingdom Gone (2008)

=== With Red Aim ===
- Flesh for Fantasy (2002)
- Niagara (2003)

=== With Heavatar ===
- All My Kingdoms (2013)

=== As a producer ===
- Autumnblaze – Every Sun Is Fragile (2013)
- Demon Incarnate – Demon Incarnate (2015)
- Demon Incarnate – Darvaza (2016)
- Dying Gorgeous Lies – The Hunter and the Prey (2019)
- Gloryful – Ocean Blade (2014)
- Gloryful – End of the Night (2016)
- Godslave – Thrashed Volume III (2012)
- Hammer King – Kingdom of the Hammer King (2015)
- Hatred – War of Words (2015)
- Infinight – Like Puppets (2011)
- Kambrium – The Elders' Realm (2016)
- Lonewolf – The Fourth and Final Horseman (2013)
- Lonewolf – Cult of Steel (2014)
- Lonewolf – The Heathen Dawn (2016)
- Lonewolf – Raised on Metal (2017)
- Messenger – Captain's Loot (2015)
- Messenger – Starwolf – Pt. 2: Novastorm (2015)
- No Hope – Beware (2017)
- Noctura – Requiem (2016)
- Noctura – Als Dornröschen mich betrog (2018)
- Powerwolf – Blood of the Saints (2011)
- Powerwolf – Alive in the Night (2012)
- Powerwolf – Preachers of the Night (2013)
- Powerwolf – Blessed & Possessed (2015)
- Powerwolf – The Metal Mass – Live (2016)
- Powerwolf – Metallum Nostrum (2019)
- The Last Supper – Solstice (2013)
- Tortuga – Pirate's Bride (2015)
- Turin Horse – Prohodna (2019)
- Unchained – Code of Persistence (2011)
- Vintundra – Isländskasagor (2012)
