= Falk Maria Schlegel =

German keyboardist

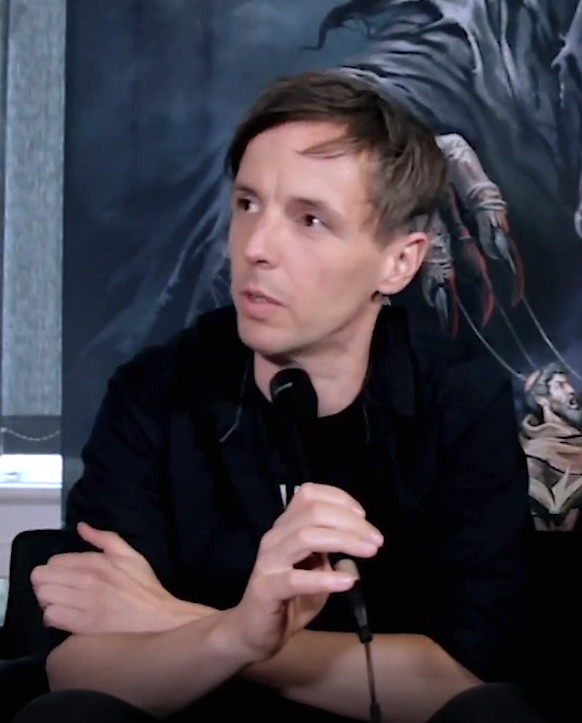
- Jost during an interview, 2018

Background information
- Birth name: Christian Jost
- Also known as: Falk Maria Schlegel; Ray Kitzler
- Born: 29 September 1975 (age 49); Saarbrücken, Saarland, West Germany
- Genres: Heavy metal; power metal; stoner rock; raga rock; punk rock; progressive metal; thrash metal
- Occupations: Musician
- Instruments: Keyboards, hammond organ, pipe organ
- Years active: 1993–present
- Formerly of: Powerwolf, Red Aim, The Experience

Christian Jost (born 29 September 1975), best known by his stage name Falk Maria Schlegel, is a German musician. He is best known as the keyboardist of power metal band Powerwolf.

== Career ==
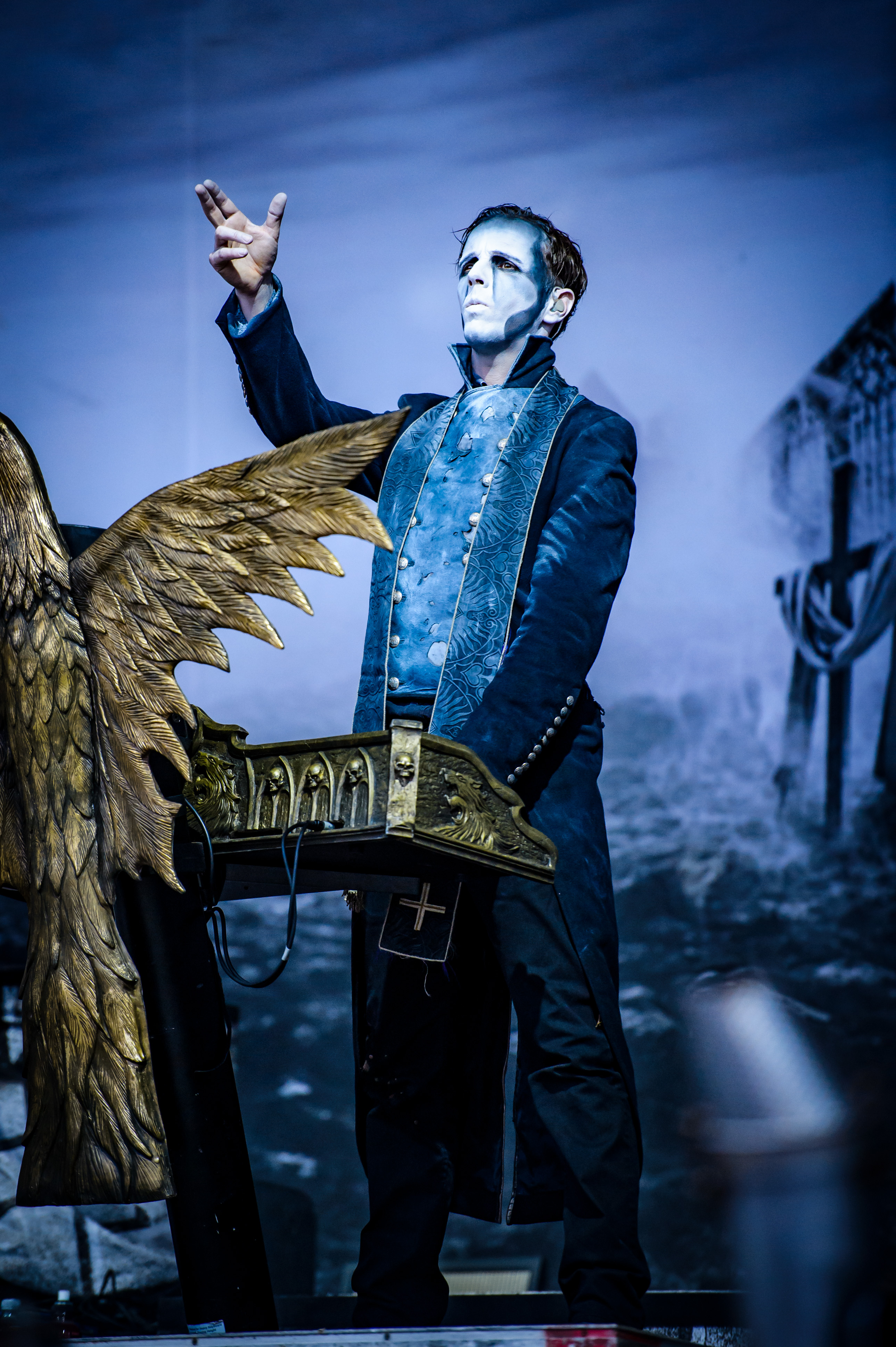
Falk Maria Schlegel performing with Powerwolf in 2017

Jost started as a keyboardist of the progressive thrash metal band The Experience in 1993. He created layout for their Insight album. He joined Red Aim in 2002 under the stage names Ray Kitzler and Ray Volver. In 2003, along with other Red Aim members he joined Powerwolf. He takes care of all the organizational matters of the band and is the link between management, record label and booking agency. He also takes care of the most important aspects of the tour planning, the logistic implementation of the various stage designs and all other applicable planning and implementation.

== Personal life ==
Jost lives in the Sankt Johann district of Saarbrücken. He claims that his main musical influences are Iron Maiden, Black Sabbath, Candlemass, Forbidden, Nevermore and Glen Hansard. He supports 1. FC Saarbrücken.

== Discography ==
=== With Powerwolf ===
- Return in Bloodred (2005)
- Lupus Dei (2007)
- Bible of the Beast (2009)
- Blood of the Saints (2011)
- Preachers of the Night (2013)
- Blessed & Possessed (2015)
- The Sacrament of Sin (2018)
- Call of the Wild (2021)
- Interludium (2023)
- Wake Up the Wicked (2024)

=== With Red Aim ===
- Flesh for Fantasy (2002)
- Niagara (2003)

=== With The Experience ===
- Mental Solitude (1995)
- Realusion (1996)
- Insight (1999)
- Cid: Reflections of a Blue Mind (2001)
