= Matthew Greywolf =

German guitarist (born 1977)

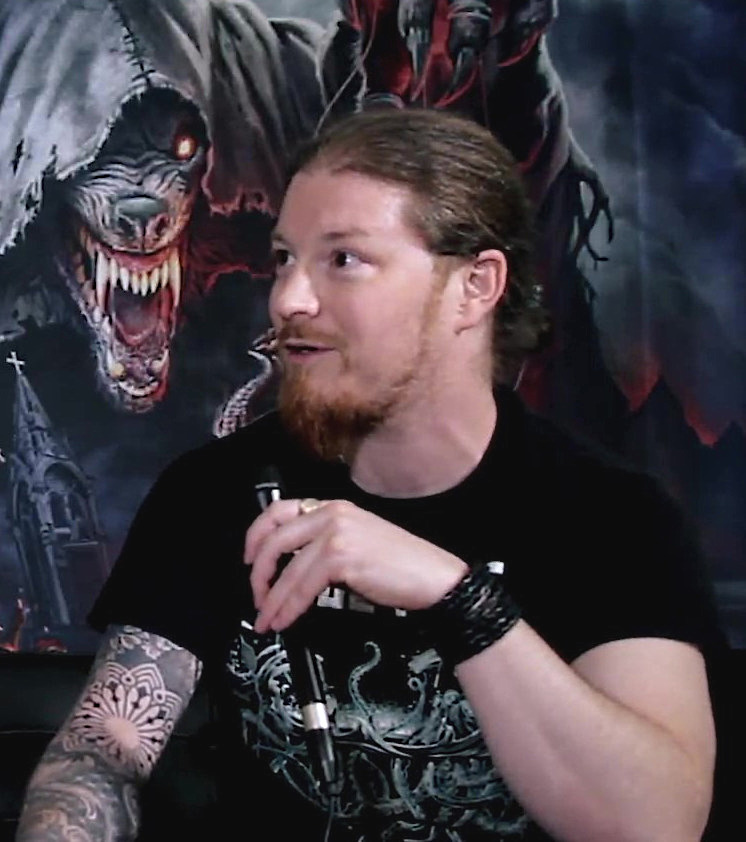
- Matthew Greywolf during an interview in 2018

Background information
- Also known as: Matthew Greywolf; B.B. Foxworth
- Born: Benjamin Buss; 7 October 1977 (age 48); Wadgassen, Saarland, West Germany
- Genres: Heavy metal; power metal; gothic metal; doom metal; stoner rock; raga rock; punk rock
- Occupations: Musician; songwriter
- Instruments: Guitar; keyboards
- Years active: 1994–present
- Member of: Powerwolf
- Formerly of: Flowing Tears, Red Aim

Benjamin Buss (pronounced [ˈbɛnjaˌmiːn bʊs]; born 7 October 1977), best known by his stage name Matthew Greywolf, is a German musician, best known as the lead guitarist and a main songwriter in the power metal band Powerwolf.

He's married to a photographer Janine Buss.

== Biography ==
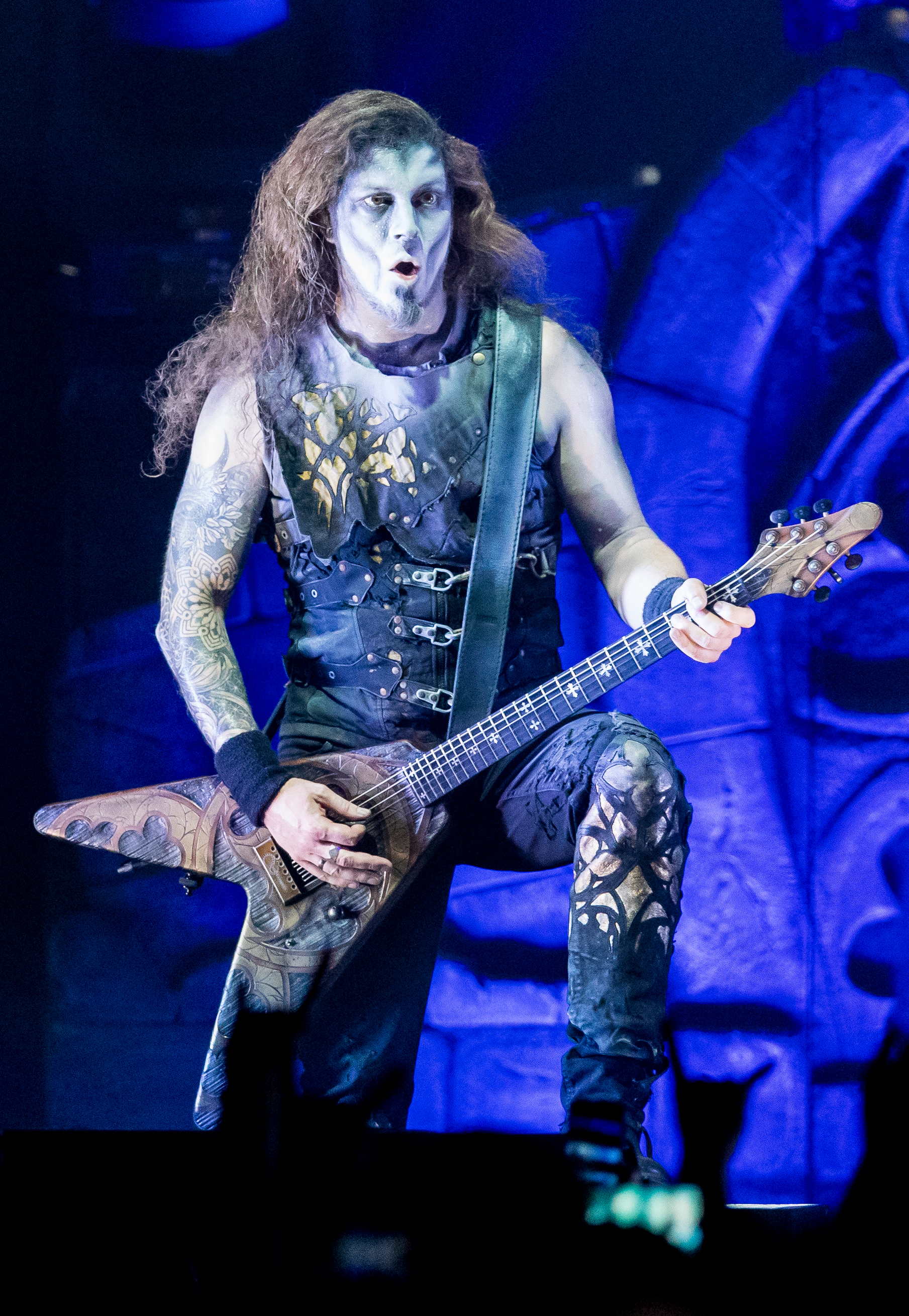
Greywolf performing with Powerwolf at Zeltfestival Rhein-Neckar in 2019

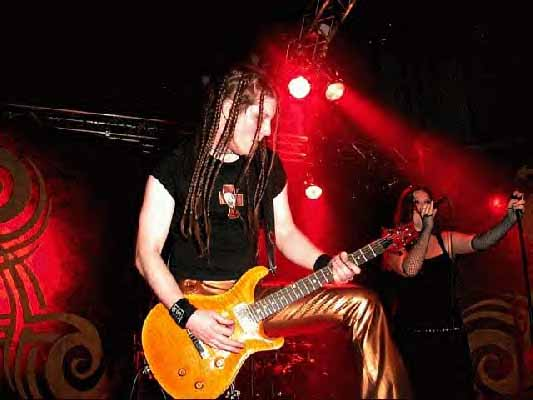
Greywolf performing with Flowing Tears in 2004

Buss comes from Wadgassen. He was raised in a Catholic family. He became interested in heavy metal music when he was 11 years old.

In 1994, along with other people he started a band Flowing Tears & Withered Flowers. He was a guitarist and a keyboardist of the band. They changed their name to Flowing Tears in 1999. In 1995 along with his schoolmate Pascal Flach he founded Red Aim.

He started Powerwolf along with Charles Greywolf (David Vogt) in 2003. He's the main songwriter of the band and a member that appears in most of the interviews with the group. He also designed the stage setup, merchandise, artwork and layout for most of their albums.

When asked if he was a Christian or a Satanist, Matthew Greywolf answered: "I am a metalist, a metal fan. Metal is my religion. Look at all these people, what unites them? I can tell you, it's the fucking metal".

He claims that his main musical influences are Iron Maiden, Black Sabbath, Scorpions, Michael Schenker Group, Mercyful Fate, Paradise Lost, Tiamat, New Model Army, Dead Can Dance and countless others.

== Discography ==
=== With Powerwolf ===
- Return in Bloodred (2005)
- Lupus Dei (2007)
- Bible of the Beast (2009)
- Blood of the Saints (2011)
- Preachers of the Night (2013)
- Blessed & Possessed (2015)
- The Sacrament of Sin (2018)
- Call of the Wild (2021)
- Interludium (2023)
- Wake Up the Wicked (2024)

=== With Flowing Tears ===
- Swansongs (1996)
- Joy Parade (1998)
- Jade (2000)
- Serpentine (2002)
- Razorbliss (2004)
- Thy Kingdom Gone (2008)

=== With Red Aim ===
- Call Me Tiger (1999)
- Saartanic Cluttydogs (2001)
- Flesh for Fantasy (2002)
- Niagara (2003)

=== Guest appearances ===
- Autumnblaze – Every Sun Is Fragile (2013; guitar on track 10 "Verglimmt")

== Equipment ==
Instruments used by Matthew Greywolf
Instrument	Years used
ESP LTD DV8-R	2003–2014
ESP LTD V-401	2014–2016
Dean Guitars custom signature V Guitar	2016–
