= Yogscast =

Entertainment company

Yogscast Ltd
- Trade name: The Yogscast
- Type: Private company limited by shares
- Industry: Entertainment
- Founded: Became active: 2008 (18 years ago); Incorporated: 3 May 2011 (15 years ago)
- Founders: Lewis Brindley; Simon Lane
- Headquarters: Bristol, England
- Key people: Lewis Brindley (director); Simon Lane (director); Richard Keith (director)
- Products: Live streaming; music; podcasts; video games; video production
- Website: yogscast.com yogscast.games pickaxe.uk jinglejam.co.uk

Yogscast Ltd, also known as The Yogscast, is a British entertainment company based in Bristol that primarily produces video gaming-related videos on YouTube and Twitch, and also operates the Yogscast multi-channel network for affiliated content creators. Initially a group of online content creators, the Yogscast began activity in 2008 and formally incorporated as a company in 2011.

The group had their roots in videos about the massively multiplayer online game World of Warcraft, but rose to popularity with their playthrough of the sandbox game Minecraft and their self-produced role-playing series Shadow of Israphel set in the same game. More recently, the group is known for playing the sandbox game Garry's Mod as well as producing a variety of live action videos.

In 2017, the group established Yogscast Games, a video game publishing label which has since published games such as Caveblazers, PlateUp!, Dungeons & Degenerate Gamblers, Brunch Club, and Trolley Problem, Inc.

They are also known for their annual Christmas live streaming charity drive named the Jingle Jam, which has cumulatively raised more than £30.8 million for various charities as of December 2025.

== History ==
=== Founding and establishment (2008–2011) ===
The group was founded in July 2008 by friends Lewis Brindley ("Xephos") and Simon Lane ("Honeydew"), with the creation of their YouTube channel named "BlueXephos" on 8 July 2008, and the publishing of their first YouTube video on 19 July 2008. Brindley and Lane first began by recording iTunes podcasts and YouTube video guides on World of Warcraft from their own homes and joined by friends from their guild, desiring to share Lane's quirky style of humour with other people around the world. The name of their fledgling channel, "Yogscast", was derived from the name of their World of Warcraft guild Ye Olde Goone Squade (YOGS), which itself originated from the forum community of Something Awful, the users of which commonly refer to themselves as "goons". In August 2010, they joined the multi-channel network TheGameStation, a sub-network of Maker Studios.

In December 2010, they recorded a Minecraft video series subsequently named Shadow of Israphel which amassed a large number of views and subscribers, and catapulted them to popularity. On 3 May 2011, Brindley and Lane officially incorporated The Yogscast as a registered company in Reading, Berkshire. They also moved into a house which they also shared with their friend Hannah Rutherford ("Lomadia") in Reading. They also started a secondary channel for showcasing dubbed-over trailers that they called "yogscast2". In October 2011, The Yogscast's main YouTube channel "YOGSCAST Lewis & Simon" hit one million subscribers, making them the biggest YouTube channel in the United Kingdom at that time.

Other members of Ye Olde Goone Squade subsequently joined Brindley and Lane in creating their own content under the Yogscast brand. Rutherford initially ran The Yogscast's secondary channel which later became her own channel to create her own content, while other early associates such as Duncan Jones ("Lalna"), Paul Sykes ("Sjin"), and Chris Lovasz ("Sips") created their own channels to record their own videos, marking the start of the Yogscast family.

=== Early difficulties (2011–2012) ===
The Yogscast team held their own panel at MineCon 2011, where they showcased some of the work of the Minecraft community. Following the event, the group came under fire from Minecraft creator Markus Persson, who stated that he would no longer work with the group, citing use of profanity and unprofessional behaviour. These claims were questioned by some MineCon attendees as well as game commentator TotalBiscuit. The Yogscast responded on Reddit and via a YouTube video, denying the accusations and expressing their disappointment and frustration with the organisation of MineCon, as well as their respect for Persson and the Minecraft community at large. Persson later apologised for the misunderstanding and retracted his accusations, attributing the statements to stress and miscommunication. To date, however, The Yogscast have not published further coverage of subsequent MineCons, nor have they ever worked professionally with Persson.

In 2012, indie games developer Winterkewl Games ran a Kickstarter campaign to develop a video game called Yogventures! based upon the intellectual property of The Yogscast featuring Brindley's and Lane's Shadow of Israphel avatars. The goal of $250,000 was quickly reached, with a full total of $567,000 eventually being raised by 13,647 donators. However, the project stalled after Winterkewl Games ran out of funds, and was eventually cancelled in July 2014. Brindley later clarified that the $150,000 the Yogscast had received from the Kickstarter "was spent directly fulfilling physical rewards for Kickstarter backers, packing and shipping the rewards, covering marketing expenses... and supporting the project over close to three years", and that The Yogscast spent "considerably more than any money [they] received on rewards" for backers. Backers were compensated with a copy of the game TUG developed by Nerd Kingdom, who also took hold of all developmental Yogventures! artwork and source code. Later in September of that year, backers were also given a copy of the game Landmark by Sony Online Entertainment.

=== Growth in popularity (2012–2016) ===
Despite the setbacks, The Yogscast continued to grow rapidly in scale and popularity. In January 2012, their main channel was the fourth most popular YouTube channel in the United Kingdom with 632 million views, ahead that of BBC Worldwide's YouTube channel, but by June 2012, The Yogscast's main channel became the first channel in the United Kingdom to reach one billion views, and by June 2013, they had acquired five million subscribers.

In 2012, Brindley and Lane moved their operations out of their bedrooms in Reading and set up their first office at New Bond House in Bond Street, Bristol, dubbing it "YogTowers". Bristol was chosen for its infrastructure and transport links to London and within South West England for ease of access by the other members of their team. Their team continued to expand as other members of The Yogscast also moved in to the office to consolidate their operations in the shared space, and by July 2012 The Yogscast had more than a dozen members and staff in their office. A variety of new friends and content creators such as Martyn Littlewood ("InTheLittleWood") and Hat Films also joined, marking the expansion of the Yogscast line-up beyond the original World of Warcraft group. As part of a collaboration with Sega and Humble Bundle, a playable character based on Lane was released as downloadable content for Sonic & All-Stars Racing Transformed on 6 December 2013, with all proceeds going to charity.

The channel began to release a series of music videos during this period, including a 4 Non Blondes' "What's Up?" parody named "HONEYDEWYEAYEA", "MoonQuest: An Epic Journey", "Screw the Nether", and "Diggy Diggy Hole", the latter of which received 54 million views and was later covered by power metal band Wind Rose.

The Yogscast also began to hold regular public appearances in exhibitions and events throughout the United Kingdom where they would perform live shows and organise signings at events like the Insomnia Gaming Festival and the London Comic Con. In 2014, Brindley was named by The Sunday Times as one of Britain's 500 most influential people.

=== Diversification and independence (2016–present) ===
Citing professional difficulties, The Yogscast left Maker Studios in 2016 and set up their own multi-channel network. The Yogscast also partnered with Microsoft to produce and manage the Xbox On channel on YouTube on behalf of Xbox UK. In addition, numerous content creators such as Matthew Meredith ("Caff"), BasicallyBea, GeestarGames, Overwatch Central, and Vidiots also joined as part of the larger Yogscast network.

In May 2017, The Yogscast announced their first published game, Caveblazers, developed by indie games developer Deadpan Games, as part of their foray into the game publishing business, marking the start of another new revenue stream for the company. Their second published game, Brunch Club was released in August 2019. In August 2022, they published PlateUp!, their most successful game to date which sold over 500,000 units as of October 2022.

In July 2017, The Yogscast left their old headquarters at Bond Street and shifted to larger offices elsewhere in Bristol at the King William House in Queen Square, furnishing it with new amenities and upgraded equipment. Their new dedicated recording suites were also made available for rental by content producers to record and stream content. These new headquarters were named The Yogscast Studios, abbreviated as "YogStudios". Old studio equipment that was previously used by The Yogscast in the old offices was also given to the National Science and Media Museum to be used as part of a new museum development.

In November 2017, The Yogscast spun off Fourth Floor Creative, a creative agency specialising in influencer marketing within the video game industry headed by The Yogscast's chief revenue officer Rich Keith. They were formed as a separate entity with the stated intention of drawing upon their experience gathered from being in The Yogscast to work with companies and influencers outside of The Yogscast. They began with a team of two, but within their first year they had grown to encompass eighteen staff and conduct 140 marketing campaigns, most of them for non-Yogscast influencers.

From July to August 2019, members Matthew "Caff" Meredith and Paul "Sjin" Sykes as well as CEO Mark Turpin were removed from The Yogscast or resigned following various allegations of inappropriate conduct. Turpin was accused of causing a woman "several breakdowns", "making suggestive comments", "discussing what he liked about [the woman's] body even when [she] showed a clear disinterest in it", and mentioning "sending nudes". He was suspended, and later resigned from Yogscast. Sykes was ousted from the company after being accused by community members of inappropriately messaging them in chatrooms between 2012 and 2015.

In August 2019, The Yogscast hosted their own convention named YogCon. The event was hosted in Motion in Bristol, and 800 tickets were made available for purchase. The event featured three stages, two of which were live-streamed on Twitch. These stages featured events including; live book reading, a live version of the Triforce! podcast, a live music session and a pub quiz which both attendees of YogCon and people following the livestream could take part in.

In 2021, The Yogscast made a six-figure investment in Chance & Counters, a board game café based in Bristol, to help fund further expansion plans.

Also in 2021, Yogscast launched a podcast division, Pickaxe. They promote a successful slate of shows, including Simon's Peculiar Portions, Hat Films' The Hat Chat Podcast, Chance & Counters, Zero Degrees and The Review of Death: A Doctor Who Podcast.

As of 6 July 2026, the main Yogscast YouTube channel has ~7,060,000 subscribers, 4,717,386,128 video views, and featured 30 other YouTube channels, while the Yogscast Twitch channel has ~948,000 followers and a total of 137,820,000 video views.

== Productions ==
=== Video series ===
==== World of Warcraft ====
The Yogscast's World of Warcraft videos were the first videos released by The Yogscast and largely took the form of parodic how-to videos. In July 2010, Brindley and Lane also began a series of play-through videos previewing the Cataclysm expansion pack's closed beta. Much of The Yogscast's initial popularity was due to media and blog coverage of these videos, with Joystiq (later becoming Engadget) regularly covering them as they were released.

==== Minecraft ====
One of the most popular video features of The Yogscast are their many Minecraft series. In December 2010, Brindley and Lane began an ongoing series of Let's Play-style Minecraft survival multiplayer videos. As the series progressed, it evolved into a semi-improvised comedy drama named Shadow of Israphel. This new series led to a boom in the number of the group's YouTube subscribers and was a major contributing factor in their rise to fame. The last installment, episode 42, was released in July 2012. The series has been put on hold since and has not been officially cancelled, although its indefinite hiatus remains a recurring joke amongst The Yogscast and their audience.

Since then, they have also produced other narrative-driven series set in Minecraft, often with the use of modpacks like Tekkit, such as Jaffa Factory, YogLabs, MoonQuest and Hole Diggers which have also attracted a large audience.

Another of Brindley and Lane's Minecraft series also involved them playing and bumbling through different player-made adventure maps, showcasing different maps made by the player community.

In June 2011, The Yogscast curated and released a collection of Minecraft mods which they named the "Yogbox".

==== Garry's Mod ====
Since 2014, the Yogscast have regularly published videos of members playing the Trouble in Terrorist Town (TTT) gamemode included as part of the game Garry's Mod. Over the years, the group have modified the gamemode repeatedly, introducing a variety of new roles, house rules and items.

==== Live action ====
The Yogscast have participated and produced their own large-scale live action series. The most common of these are the group's coverage of various gaming conventions, RPG sessions, video game-based "challenge" videos, and variations of television shows such as Taskbox (based on Taskmaster), The Cult (a version of The Traitors) and Murder in Bell End (a parody of Murder in Successville) .

Other notable live action productions include a discussion with television and radio presenter Jonathan Ross, a mockumentary-style interview with actor Warwick Davis, an interview with Sigourney Weaver, a promotional project with Peter Molyneux, and a series of promotional live action sketches with Ubisoft, EA, Microsoft, the BBC, Lucasfilm, Disney, Universal Studios, Blizzard Entertainment, Sony, and some smaller indie developers.

=== Podcasts ===
==== YoGPoD ====
YoGPoD
- Genre: Gaming, Comedy
- Language: English

Cast and voices
- Hosted by: Lewis Brindley; Simon Lane

Production
- Length: 15 – 120 minutes

Publication
- Original release: 5 February 2009; 17 years ago
- Provider: Yogscast Ltd.

The YoGPoD is the group's first podcast, first released on 5 February 2009, and was intended to run alongside the group's YouTube video releases. Along with hosts Brindley and Lane, it often featured other members of their World of Warcraft guild, and was initially released with a proposed weekly schedule. Releases became more sporadic over time, however, to the point that "YoGPoD 42: Strawnana" came out on 4 July 2012, 5 months after its predecessor. A Halloween-themed YoGPoD, "YoGPoD 44: Halloween Spack-2-cular" was released on 28 October 2012, followed by "YoGPoD 45: Halloween Spack-3-cular" on 30 October 2013. Following the 2013 Halloween YoGPoD, there was a short run of releases from October 2015 to January 2016, before the schedule paused again.

On 9 July 2018, a surprise Halloween-themed episode entitled "YoGPoD 51: Halloween Spack-10-cular" was released to celebrate a decade of Yogscast content. Despite the name, it was recorded and released far from Halloween.

The YoGPoD has no strict structure, but one of the more prominent features has Lane impersonate public figures that Brindley then "interviews". Brian Blessed, Warwick Davis and Queen Elizabeth II are often parodied in this fashion.

The podcast reached #1 on the iTunes UK Podcasts chart on 4 July 2012, following the release of "YoGPoD 42: Strawnana".

==== Triforce! ====
Triforce!
- Genre: Gaming, Chat
- Language: English

Cast and voices
- Hosted by: Lewis Brindley; Sips (Chris Lovasz); Pyrion Flax (Edward Forsyth)

Production
- Length: 30 – 120 minutes

Publication
- Original release: 23 March 2016; 10 years ago
- Provider: Yogscast Ltd.

Triforce! is a gaming and general discussion podcast hosted by Lewis Brindley, Sips (Chris Lovasz) and Pyrion Flax (Edward Forsyth). It was first released on 23 March 2016. The podcast is posted alongside The YoGPoD and features the trio talking about various ideas centred on gaming but also expand to current topics and sporadic thoughts. The structure of the podcast is fairly loose, with an introduction, miscellaneous topics, a gaming section, a reading from Pyrion Flax's homebrew fiction Bodega (Episode 19 to Episode 43) and in the early episodes, a Q and A from Twitter followers at the close of the podcast. Recent podcasts feature a current events segment, "Lew's News", and dedicated "Mailbag" episodes for reading and responding to fan mail.

In 2017, the official YoGPoD YouTube channel was rebranded for the Triforce! podcast. A spinoff audiobook style series, titled Bodega, was also debuted. The series features excerpts of the regular Triforce!, podcast where Pyrion Flax narrates his homebrew Science fiction. Bodega: Tales from the Bodegaverse was published in print and ebook formats in 2019.

==== Other podcasts ====
Hat Chat is a comedy variety podcast hosted by Chris Trott, Ross Hornby, and Alex Smith of Hat Films.

Simon's Peculiar Portions takes the form of hosts Simon Lane and Lewis Brindley discussing odd but true news stories Simon has found on the internet each week. The podcast is also published in video form to the main Yogscast YouTube channel.

Pitch, Please is hosted by Yogscast editors Tom Hazell and Alex Turner. Each episode, the hosts discuss wacky pitches for new video games with one or more of the developers from Yogscast Games, often guest starring another member or friend of the Yogscast.

High Rollers: Aerois is an RPG Dungeons & Dragons podcast hosted by a group of Yogscast members known as the High Rollers, led by Mara Holmes in the role of Dungeon Master.

=== Live broadcasts ===
The Yogscast Jingle Jam is a series of live streams that are shown over the course of December each year with the intention to raise money for charity.

High Rollers D&D is a live play Dungeons & Dragons series that was broadcast live on the Yogscast Twitch channel on Sundays from 5pm GMT. It is the largest Dungeons & Dragons livestream in Europe, and has partnered with Wizards of the Coast on several miniseries. High Rollers D&D left the Yogscast in 2023 to become an independently produced show.

The Yogscast Poker Nights is a series of poker games broadcast live on Twitch. In May 2018, The Yogscast signed a six-episode sponsorship deal with KamaGames to promote the latter's Pokerist app on the live stream.

=== Music ===
The Yogscast intermittently publishes music created by members and friends of the Yogscast. This initially consisted mostly of video game parodies of existing songs, later expanding to include more original productions. Many of the Yogscast's releases are produced by Tom Clarke of Area 11.

Initially music was released on Bandcamp under the Yogscast Studios label. Since late 2024, music credited to The Yogscast has been published by Clarke's production company, Deepforge Sound Labs. Hat Films typically publish their music separately on their own Bandcamp page.

In 2019, Wind Rose released a cover of "Diggy Diggy Hole", originally performed by the Yogscast. Since 2021, The Longest Johns have performed annually as part of the Yogscast's Jingle Jam and have covered multiple Yogscast tracks.

==== Studio albums ====
Title	Performers	Release date	Notes
Yogscast Christmas 2012	The Yogscast	December 2012	Compilation of Christmas themed original songs and parodies.
Hark! T'is What Thou Refers To As Yogsmas!	The Yogscast	20 December 2013	Compilation of Christmas themed original songs and parodies, includes all tracks from Yogscast Christmas 2012.
Population: You	Hat Films (as Pleasureville)	5 December 2015	
Destination Drumpf	Hat Films	13 December 2016	
Neon Musk	Hat Films	8 December 2017	
Secret Santa	Hat Films (as Mr. Sam & the Deadnutz)	16 December 2018	
Tuesday Night	Mr. Sam & the Deadnutz	18 December 2019	
YogLabs 2 (Official Soundtrack)	The Yogscast, Sparkles*	22 November 2025	

==== Remix and cover albums ====
Title	Performers	Release date	Notes
Population: US	Hat Films (as Pleasureville)	21 December 2015	Remixes of tracks from Population: You by James Dean Death Scene, Captain Sampy, Sinescape, BARx, SuperDuck, Mattokamus Does Stuff, and Alan Sutch.
Destination Drumpf: The Remixes	Hat Films	29 December 2016	Remixes of tracks from Destination Drumpf by BARx, Bad Habit, Sinescape, Mattokamus, Eat Cake, Magnus Erlandsen, 60 Hers, SuperDuck, SATALYT, and TokenMachine.
Neon Musk - Remix Collection	Hat Films	22 December 2017	Remixes of tracks from Neon Musk by Oliver Sherlock, Sinescape, VaultsOfExtoth, PvtFish, Eat Cake, Sam Pridige, Jacob Bathead, TokenMachine, tacocat, Mighty Humdinger, DenseMuffin, Ben Steer, Hipst3r, Teemu Sanio, Indefinity, and BARx.
Secret Santa - The Remixes	Hat Films (as Mr. Sam & the Deadnutz)	30 December 2018	Remixes of tracks from Secret Santa by BARx, Indefinity, Sinescape, August Stapput, Lizziefij, MilitantCow, Oliver Sherlock, Plaber, and Isaac Lewis.
Remixing on a Tuesday Night	Mr. Sam & the Deadnutz	31 December 2019	Remixes of tracks from Tuesday Night by Sinescape, BARx, Oliver Sherlock, MilitantCow, TokenMachine, Isaac Lewis, CasualDorayaki, and Larry Rouse.
christmas lofi beats to relax/dig holes to (volume 1)	The Yogscast	6 December 2024	Compilation of lo-fi covers of Yogscast Christmas singles.
lofi beats to relax/dig holes to (volume 1)	The Yogscast	14 May 2025	Compilation of lo-fi covers of previous Yogscast singles and other music associated with the group.
christmas lofi beats to relax/dig holes to (volume 2)	The Yogscast	8 December 2025	

==== Singles ====
Title	Performers	Release date	Notes
"M.I.L.K."	The Yogscast	1 November 2011	Parody of "Y.M.C.A." by Village People.
"Hey Yogscast"	Monica Prunier	15 February 2012	
"Screw the Nether"	InTheLittleWood	13 August 2012	Parody of "Moves Like Jagger" by Maroon 5.
"HONEYDEWYEAYEA"	The Yogscast	23 June 2013	Cover of "What's Up?" by 4 Non Blondes.
"How Do I Craft This Again?"	InTheLittleWood	11 October 2013	Parody of "When Can I See You Again?" by Owl City.
"Big Girl"	Sips	29 November 2013	Parody of "Rich Girl" by Hall & Oates.
"Diggy Diggy Hole"	The Yogscast	19 August 2014	
"Does Santa Claus (Visit Zombie Pig-Men Kids in the Nether in Minecraft at Christmas Time?)"	The Yogscast	6 December 2014	
"All Rise for Datlof"	The Yogscast	31 January 2015	
"Carrot for a Cock"/"Carrot for a Nose"	The Yogscast	13 December 2015	
"Welcome to Yoglabs"	The Yogscast	21 December 2015	
"Dwarves vs Leprechauns"	The Yogscast	12 April 2016	
"The World Needs Heroes"	The Yogscast	29 June 2016	About the Overwatch franchise.
"Get Fucked Up"	Knights of Neon ft. The Yogscast	6 December 2016	
"Brand New Friend at Christmas Time"	The Yogscast	14 December 2016	
"Pleasure Jam"	SuperDuck ft. The Yogscast	16 December 2016	Remix of streams from the 2015 Jingle Jam.
"Who's That? (Jingle Jam Remix)"	SuperDuck ft. The Yogscast	9 December 2017	Remix of streams from the 2016 Jingle Jam.
"Yogplague"	Hat Films	23 December 2019	
"The Best Christmas Song Ever"	The Yogscast	1 December 2020	
"The Most Christmassy Christmas Ever"	The Yogscast	14 December 2021	
"Diggy Diggy Hole (Community Version)"	The Longest Johns ft. The Yogscast	1 December 2023	
"Coffee Machine"	The Yogscast	23 October 2025	
"Sk8r Dad"	The Yogscast	30 October 2025	
"New Computer"	The Yogscast	10 November 2025	
"Diggy Diggy Hole 2: Coming Home"	The Yogscast	29 November 2025	B-side is a folk cover performed by The Longest Johns.

== Yogscast Games ==
The Yogscast formed a video game publishing division, Yogscast Games, in 2017. It has since published games such as Caveblazers, Brunch Club, Landlord's Super and Drink More Glurp, as well as Helheim Hassle, Startenders, Trolley Problem, Inc, Golfie, and PlateUp! In August 2020, it announced Tiny Teams, a week-long indie games festival broadcast on The Yogscast's Twitch channel and hosted by director of publishing at the time Ben Edgar. In August 2021, the label hired Simon Byron as director of publishing, who had previously worked in the same role at Curve Digital.

Drink More Glurp, a game in which players compete in alien olympics, was released in August 2020 on the Nintendo Switch.

Trolley Problem, Inc, released in April 2022, was a dark comedy game based on the trolley problem.

PlateUp!, a roguelike restaurant management game made by solo developer Alastair Janse van Rensburg, was released in August 2022. Within 12 days of its release, the game had grossed $1 million on Steam.

=== Games published ===
Year	Title	Developer	Platform	Publisher
2017	Caveblazers	Deadpan Games	Microsoft Windows, Nintendo Switch	Yogscast Games
2019	Brunch Club	Froggy Box Games	Microsoft Windows, Nintendo Switch, PlayStation 4, Xbox One	Yogscast Games
2020	Drink More Glurp	Catastrophic Overload	Microsoft Windows, macOS, Linux, Nintendo Switch	Yogscast Games
2020	Helheim Hassle	Perfectly Paranormal	Microsoft Windows, macOS, Linux, Nintendo Switch, PlayStation 4, Xbox One	Yogscast Games
2022	Trolley Problem, Inc.	Read Graves	Microsoft Windows	Yogscast Games
2022	PlateUp!	It's Happening	Microsoft Windows, Nintendo Switch, Xbox One, Xbox Series X/S, PlayStation 5	Yogscast Games, Gamersky Games
2022	Bots Are Stupid	Leander Edler-Golla	Microsoft Windows, macOS, Linux	Yogscast Games
2023	Golfie	Triheart Studio	Microsoft Windows	Yogscast Games
2023	Aces & Adventures	Triple.B.Titles	Microsoft Windows	Yogscast Games
2023	Beyond the Long Night	Noisy Head Games	Microsoft Windows, macOS	Yogscast Games
2023	Landlord's Super	Minskworks	Microsoft Windows	Yogscast Games
2023	Hexarchy	Main Tank Software	Microsoft Windows, macOS	Yogscast Games
2024	Startenders: Intergalactic Bartending	Froggy Box Games	Meta Quest, PlayStation VR, SteamVR	Yogscast Games
2024	Hexguardian	Split Second Games	Microsoft Windows	Yogscast Games
2024	Dungeons & Degenerate Gamblers	Purple Moss Collectors	Microsoft Windows, macOS, Linux	Yogscast Games
2024	Tales & Tactics	Table 9 Studio	Microsoft Windows	Yogscast Games
2024	The Holy Gosh Darn	Perfectly Paranormal	Microsoft Windows, Nintendo Switch, PlayStation 4, PlayStation 5, Xbox One, Xbox Series X/S	Yogscast Games
2025	Stray Path	chx Games	Microsoft Windows	Yogscast Games, Gamersky Games
2025	Border Pioneer	Yahzj Games	Microsoft Windows, macOS	Yogscast Games, Gamersky Games
2025	Time to Morp	Team HalfBeard	Microsoft Windows	Yogscast Games
2025	Kaya's Prophecy	Jérémie & Thibaut	Microsoft Windows	Yogscast Games
2025	Monster Mop Up	Terahard	Microsoft Windows	Yogscast Games
2025	Dicealot	Goodview Games	Microsoft Windows	Yogscast Games
2025	The Royal Writ	Save Sloth Games	Microsoft Windows	Yogscast Games
2026	Rhell: Warped Worlds & Troubled Times	SlugGlove	Microsoft Windows, Linux	Yogscast Games
2026	Infinity Sweeper	LongShot Studio	Microsoft Windows, macOS	Yogscast Games, Gamersky Games
2026	The Gate Must Stand	Senmu Studio	Microsoft Windows	Yogscast Games, Gamersky Games
2026	Dupery: A Game of Solo Deduction	Gilded Rune Games	Microsoft Windows, macOS	Yogscast Games, Gamersky Games

== Current members ==
Current active content creators
Creator	Alias(es)		Year joined
Lewis Brindley	Xephos, BlueXephos		2008
Simon Lane	Honeydew		2008
Duncan Jones	LividCoffee, Lalna		2009
Chris Lovasz	Sips		2009
Joakim Hellstrand	Rythian		2009
Martyn Littlewood	InTheLittleWood		2011
Liam Mackay	Nilesy		2012
Jonathan Whitten	Ravs		2012
Zoey	Zoeya, Proasheck		2012
Kim Richards	NanoSounds, NanoKim		2013
Rick Van Laanen	Zylus, Zylush		2013
Alex Smith	Alsmiffy	Hat Films	2013
Ross Hornby	Rossperu, Djh3max	Hat Films	2013
Chris Trott	Trottimus	Hat Films	2013
Tom Clark	Angory Tom		2013
Ben Edgar	Bedgar		2014
Ted Forsyth	Pyrion Flax		2014
Harry Marshall	Barry, VeteranHarry		2014
Mara Holmes	Sherlock Hulmes		2015
Bekki	Bekkiboom		2017
Georgia Dana	Gee, GeeStar		2017
Hanna Vaughn	Mousie, MousieMouse		2017

Current active content creators (cont.)
Creator	Alias(es)	Year joined
Ben Wilson	Wilsonator	2017
Peter Mann	Pedguin, Ped	2017
Nicholas Buccino	Daltos	2018
Joe Hickson		2018
Daff	DafnotDaff	2018
Ben Potter	Vidiots	2018
Peter Austin	Vidiots	2018
Michael Johnson	Vidiots	2018
Alex	Alex The Rambler	2018
Lydia Ellery	SquidGame, Lyds	2018
Sophie Rogerson	Bouphe	2018
Fionn Riches	Saberial	2019
Tom	The Spiffing Brit, Spiff	2019
M4ng0	Mango, 0r4nge_M4ng0	2020
Emmalee	Boba, BobaWitch	2020
Breeh		2020
Briony Turner	BrionyKay	2020
Xander	Drakon Astron	2020
Xenophyte		2020
Rosie Rogerson	Osiefish	2020
Sarah	Yogtok	2021
Shadowatnoon		2022
Kirsty		2022
Laura	Lolip, Lolipopgi	2022

== Charity initiatives ==
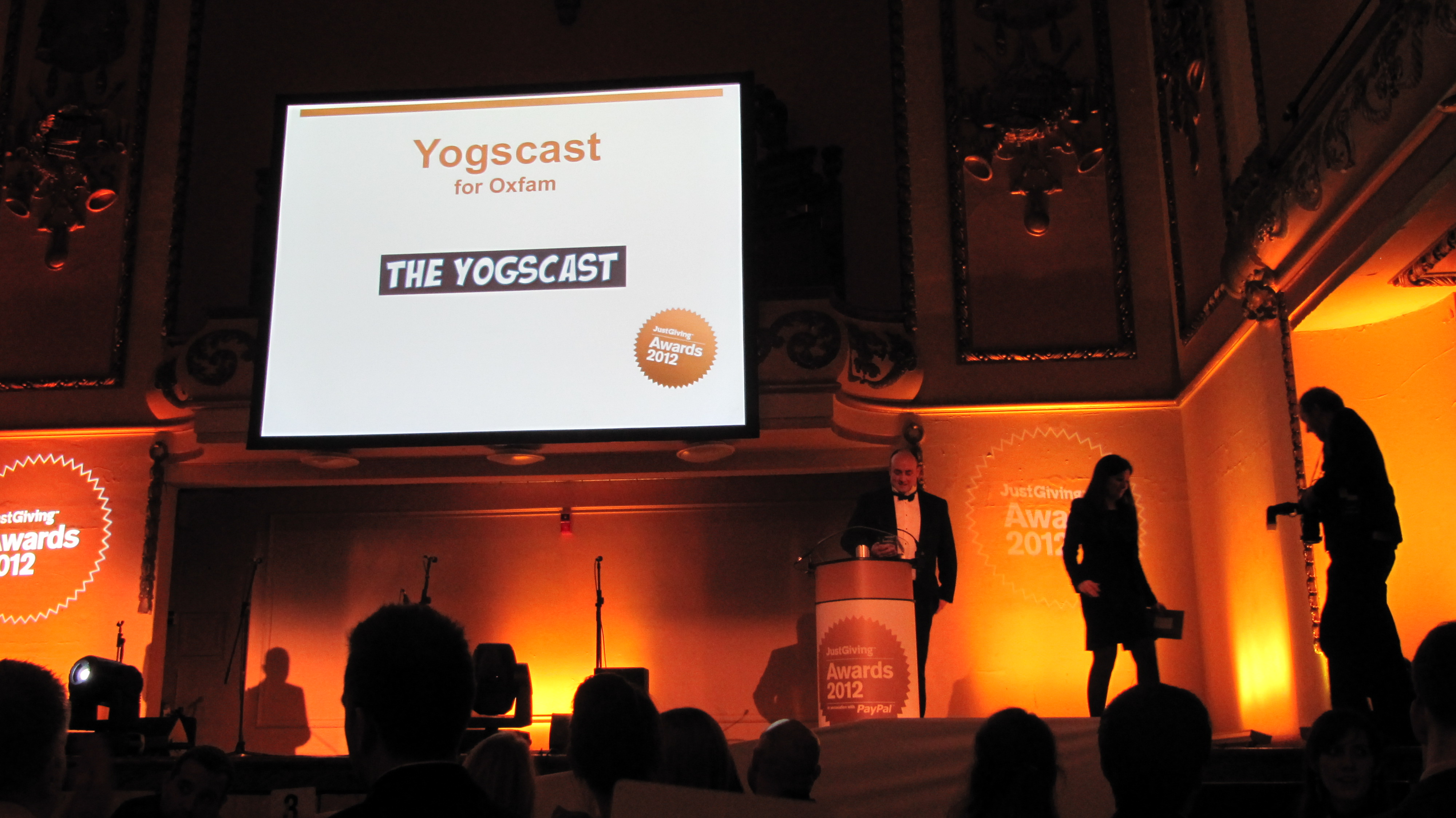
The Yogscast at JustGiving Awards 2012, accepting the award for Most Popular Fundraiser

Since 2011, The Yogscast have organised a series of live streams every year in December to benefit charity. The idea began when fans would send presents to Brindley and Lane during the Christmas season, but they would instead insist that the money be donated to charity.

The Yogscast started their first charity live stream in December 2011 with the intention to raise money for Oxfam's Give a Goat programme to "send locally-sourced and vaccinated goats to families living in poverty." As part of their charity drive, the group hosted a live stream on Twitch every day in December while viewers were encouraged to donate to the charity through the JustGiving fundraising portal. The live streams were broadcast out of the basement of the house which Brindley, Lane, and Rutherford shared at that time. A total of £66,040.30 was raised, exceeding the target goal of £60,000. For this achievement, The Yogscast was named JustGiving's Most Popular Fundraiser of 2012.

For the 2012 holiday season, the Yogscast team conducted another charity drive for Oxfam called Honeydew's Honey Drive, with a target of raising £60,000. Improvements over the previous year included upgrading to a dedicated streaming studio in their new offices in Bristol, as well as the participation of other YouTube content producers such as Hat Films, TotalBiscuit, and Athene. The charity drive was organised in aid of Oxfam's 'Plan Bee' to provide training and equipment for beekeeping in Ethiopia and '365 Emergency Fund' for the provision of urgent aid in emergencies. In addition to viewer donations through the JustGiving website, the team also raised additional proceeds through the sale of Twitch subscriptions, merchandise and Christmas songs to be donated to charity. As incentive to donate and at Lane's goading, Brindley agreed to cross-dress in a female bee costume should the charity drive reach their target goal. The goal was reached, and as promised, Brindley dressed up in the costume for Christmas Day. Honeydew's Honey Drive was successful in raising £240,568.25, more than triple that of the previous year. The group were again nominated for JustGiving's Most Popular Fundraiser of 2013, and received a Special Recognition Award at the JustGiving Awards ceremony.

In 2013, The Yogscast hosted the Dwarven Dairy Drive. Starting with this charity drive, donations were made through Humble Bundle instead of JustGiving, allowing donators to receive an assortment of games and in-game content as a token of appreciation. Donations were also distributed to benefit multiple charities rather than just one — in addition to Oxfam, the charity drive also supported GamesAid, Little People UK, Special Effect, and War Child. This charity drive attracted considerably more donators than previous livestreams, and raised a total of $1,159,746.33, triple that of the previous year.

The Yogscast Ukraine Fundraiser, held 9 August 2022, successfully raised £19,280.18 for War Child UK (humanitarian aid for children displaced during the 2022 Russian invasion of Ukraine).

=== Jingle Jam ===
Jingle Jam
- Founded: Became active: 2014 (12 years ago); Registered: 15 August 2022 (4 years ago)
- Type: Charitable organization
- Registration no.: 1200061
- Headquarters: Bristol
- Region served: UK
- Chair: Richard Keith
- Key people: Lewis Brindley (Trustee); Johanna Cooke (Trustee)
- Staff: 6
- Website: www.jinglejam.co.uk

In 2014, The Yogscast named their live stream charity drive the Yogscast Jingle Jam, which has remained the theme for every year's charity drive since then. The Yogscast Jingle Jam 2015 invited special guests to the live streams including fellow YouTube celebrities Adam Montoya ("SeaNanners"), Jordan Maron ("CaptainSparklez") and Toby Turner ("Tobuscus").

Subsequent years saw the charity drive break records in quick succession. The Yogscast Jingle Jam 2016 surpassed the previous year's total within the first week of the charity drive, and raised more than double their 2013 record, about $2.5 to 2.6 million. (Note: Depending on sources, the total number varies, with various figures given such as $2,577,801.17 according to The Yogscast's YouTube announcement (before AdSense revenue, merchandise sales, and chargebacks), $2,578,201.70 according to the Humble Bundle webpage, or more than $2.6 million according to TenEighty.) As with previous years, it featured a list of supported charities, but also enabled a new option for donators to pick another beneficiary from a list of thousands of charities.

The 2017 instalment was even more successful, raising $500,000 in the first hour, $1 million in the first day, and breaking the 2016 record within the first week. It drew a peak of 60,400 concurrent viewers in the first week of December, and by the end of the month they had broadcast more than 700 hours of live streaming and were watched by 2.5 million people, amounting to 6.8 million viewer-hours or 779 viewer-years watched, making the Yogscast the most-watched channel on Twitch that month by time watched. The charity drive raised a grand total of $5,245,772, again more than twice that of the previous year. For their work with Whale and Dolphin Conservation, The Yogscast was awarded the Celebrity Charity Champion for the Third Sector Awards in 2018.

In 2018, The Yogscast launched the Yogscast Jingle Jam 2018, adding Save the Children and Call of Duty Endowment to the list of featured charities. Again, The Yogscast became the most watched channel on Twitch by hours watched, with 2.62 million viewer-hours watched from 30 November to 6 December. In addition, the first two days produced the best-performing broadcasts of the year for the channel. The Yogscast raised $1 million within the first two days and $1.5 million within the first three. Some of the live streams included a live baking stream on 5 December in collaboration with The Great British Bake Off contestant Briony Williams, during which they also hit a milestone of raising $2 million, as well as a "Sex and Science" discussion panel on 22 December with YouTubers Hannah Witton and Simon Clark. By the end of the charity drive, the Jingle Jam 2018 had raised $3.3 million for charity, for a cumulative total of $14,939,930.53 after 2018.

The Jingle Jam 2019 raised $250,000 in the first 8 minutes and $1 million within the first 24 hours. It was the second-most watched channel on Twitch for the week of 2 to 8 December 2019, attracting 1.9 million viewer-hours, second only to ESL Pro League. Its events included the inaugural Yogscast Game Jam, a 48-hour game jam, with the theme of the year of 'GIVING!'. Eventually, it raised $2.7 million.

The Jingle Jam 2020 switched its fundraising platform to Tiltify after 7 years on Humble Bundle, while continuing to provide game bundles in return for donations. It featured a longer list of twelve charities, with limited numbers of game bundles being assigned to each charity. The duration of the charity livestream was also shortened to 2 weeks, owing due to social distancing requirements during the COVID-19 pandemic and difficulty in content generation toward the end of the fundraiser. The fundraiser raised a total of £2,120,590 ($2,841,000), bringing the cumulative total to $20 million.

The Jingle Jam 2021, in its tenth anniversary, was organised for the benefit of 14 charities, with the new additions of Autistica, End Violence and Racism Against ESEA Communities, Global's Make Some Noise, and Lifelites. In addition, other content creators were invited to create their own community fundraising live streams alongside the main campaign, with their donators also able to receive the game bundle as a reward. It again raised more than $1 million within the first 24 hours, and a total of £3,342,063. Of this, more than £480,000 were raised by 215 community fundraisers.

The Jingle Jam 2022 was announced to benefit 12 charities, with the new additions of the British Red Cross, Campaign Against Living Miserably, Dogs for Autism, Huntington's Disease Association, Kidscape, Mermaids, Movember, Reset Mental Health, and Special Olympics Great Britain. It also bundled its largest games collection to date with a donation of at least £35 being rewarded with 90 games with a retail value of more than £1,000. In August 2022, Jingle Jam was registered as a charity in England and Wales, with the Charity Commission, independent of The Yogscast.

The Jingle Jam 2023 also announced 12 charity partners: Autistica, Campaign Against Living Miserably, Comic Relief, CoppaFeel!, Galop, Hello World, Justdiggit, Movember, the Royal National Institute of Blind People, Wallace & Gromit's Grand Appeal, War Child UK, and Whale and Dolphin Conservation. In February 2023, Jingle Jam registered with the Fundraising Regulator.

The Jingle Jam 2024 was announced with 8 charities, some returning and some new: Autistica, Campaign Against Living Miserably, Cool Earth, Sarcoma UK, The Trevor Project, Wallace & Gromit's Grand Appeal, War Child, and Whale and Dolphin Conservation. Campaign Against Living Miserably and War Child were announced as strategic partners and will be regular fixtures for Jingle Jam over the next three years.

=== List of Christmas live streams ===
Year	Title	Platform	Featured charities	Funds raised in campaign (Note: Totals of fund raised are depicted in the currency that the campaign was conducted in: for 2011-2012 and since 2020, fundraising has been conducted in pound sterling, while for 2013-2019 it was conducted in United States dollars.)
2011	Yogscast Christmas Goat Giving Special	JustGiving	Oxfam's 'Give a Goat'	£66,040.30 ($102,514)
2012	Honeydew's Honey Drive	JustGiving	Oxfam's 'Plan Bee' and '365 Emergency Fund'	£240,568.25 ($391,145)
2013	Dwarven Dairy Drive	Humble Bundle	GamesAid; Little People UK; Oxfam; SpecialEffect; War Child	£708,587 ($1,159,813)
2014	Yogscast Jingle Jam	Humble Bundle	End Polio Now; Fauna and Flora International; Médecins Sans Frontières; Oxfam; SpecialEffect	£702,925 ($1,104,882)
2015	Yogscast Jingle Jam 2015	Humble Bundle	Cancer Research UK; Fauna and Flora International; GamesAid; Médecins Sans Frontières; Mental Health Foundation; Oxfam; SpecialEffect	£691,616 ($1,052,881)
2016	Yogscast Jingle Jam 2016	Humble Bundle	Cancer Research UK; GamesAid; International Lesbian, Gay, Bisexual, Trans and Intersex Association; Mental Health Foundation; SpecialEffect; Whale and Dolphin Conservation	£2,049,000 ($2,578,201)
2017	Yogscast Jingle Jam 2017	Humble Bundle	Cancer Research UK; International Lesbian, Gay, Bisexual, Trans and Intersex Association; Mental Health Foundation; SpecialEffect; Wallace & Gromit's Grand Appeal; Whale and Dolphin Conservation	£3,894,251 ($5,245,772)
2018	Yogscast Jingle Jam 2018	Humble Bundle	Cancer Research UK; Call of Duty Endowment; International Lesbian, Gay, Bisexual, Trans and Intersex Association; Mental Health Foundation; SpecialEffect; Save the Children; Wallace & Gromit's Grand Appeal; Whale and Dolphin Conservation	£2,594,961 ($3,307,959)
2019	Jingle Jam 2019	Humble Bundle	Access Sport; Call of Duty Endowment; Mental Health Foundation; SpecialEffect; Stand Up To Cancer; Wallace & Gromit's Grand Appeal; War Child; Whale and Dolphin Conservation	£2,111,250 ($2,739,251)
2020	Jingle Jam 2020	Tiltify	Access Sport; Call of Duty Endowment; ILGA; Mental Health Foundation; National Videogame Museum; One25; Open Bionics; Safe In Our World; SpecialEffect; Wallace & Gromit's Grand Appeal; War Child; Whale and Dolphin Conservation	£2,120,590 ($2,827,226)
2021	Jingle Jam 2021	Tiltify	Access Sport; Autistica; Call of Duty Endowment; Cancer Research UK; End Violence and Racism Against ESEA Communities; Global's Make Some Noise; ILGA; Lifelites; Mental Health Foundation; Open Bionics; SpecialEffect; The Grand Appeal; War Child; Whale and Dolphin Conservation	£3,345,156 ($4,435,933)
2022	Jingle Jam 2022	Tiltify	British Red Cross; Campaign Against Living Miserably (CALM); Dogs for Autism; Huntington's Disease Association; Kidscape; Mermaids; Movember; Reset Mental Health; SpecialEffect; Special Olympics Great Britain; Wallace & Gromit's Grand Appeal; Whale and Dolphin Conservation	£3,448,752 ($4,203,531)
2023	Jingle Jam 2023	Tiltify	Autistica; CALM; Comic Relief; CoppaFeel!; Galop; Movember; Hello World; Justdiggit; Royal National Institute of Blind People (RNIB); War Child; Wallace & Gromit's Grand Appeal; Whale and Dolphin Conservation	£2,702,088 ($3,422,213)
2024	Jingle Jam 2024	Tiltify	Autistica; CALM; Cool Earth; Sarcoma UK; The Trevor Project; Wallace & Gromit's Grand Appeal; War Child; Whale and Dolphin Conservation	£2,674,052 ($3,297,960)
Post-2024 cumulative subtotal				£27,351,445 ($33,728,707)
2025	Jingle Jam 2025	Tiltify	Autistica; Become; CALM; Make-A-Wish Foundation; The Trevor Project; Wallace & Gromit's Grand Appeal; War Child; World Wide Fund for Nature	£3,426,748 ($4,556,760)
Future Events
2026	Jingle Jam 2026	Tiltify	Become; CALM; GOSH; Make-A-Wish Foundation; SpecialEffect; The Trevor Project; Wallace & Gromit's Grand Appeal; War Child; World Wide Fund for Nature	TBA

== Awards and nominations ==
Year	Award ceremony	Award	Recipient	Result
2012	JustGiving Awards	Most Popular Fundraiser	The Yogscast	Won
2012	Golden Joystick Awards	YouTuber Gamer Award	The Yogscast	Won
2013	JustGiving Awards	Most Popular Fundraiser	The Yogscast	Nominated
2013	Golden Joystick Awards	YouTuber Gamer Award	The Yogscast	Won
2016	The Shorty Awards	Social Media Awards (Gaming)	The Yogscast	Nominated
2017	The Shorty Awards	Social Media Awards (Gaming)	Hannah Rutherford	Nominated
2018	Third Sector Awards	Celebrity Charity Champion	The Yogscast	Won

== See also ==
- Hat Films
- RTGame
