= Caveblazers =

2017 video game

- Steam version digital art
- Developer: Deadpan Games
- Publisher: Yogscast Games
- Platforms: Windows, Nintendo Switch
- Release: Windows; 24 May 2017; Nintendo Switch; 10 January 2019
- Genre: Platform
- Mode: Single-player

Caveblazers is a 2017 video game developed by Deadpan Games and published by Yogscast Games. Described as an "action-focused roguelike platformer", players in Caveblazers defeat enemies across runs of procedurally-generated dungeons to accumulate items, weapons, and potions with random effects. The developers described the design of the game as aiming to "move away from the simplistic combat systems" of other roguelike games to focus on "fast-paced combat". Upon release, the game received generally favorable reviews, with praise directed to the game's roguelike mechanics, customisation and challenging difficulty, and criticism for its lack of variety of environments and enemies. A port of the game for the Nintendo Switch was released in 2019.

== Gameplay ==
Gameplay screenshot

Caveblazers is a roguelike in which the player completes short runs by defeating enemies across a series of floors in procedurally-generated dungeons with randomized enemies, items, and bosses. The player progresses between runs by accumulating experience points based on their performance, including the number of enemies killed and the number of floors cleared. Experience allows the player to gain levels, providing them with access to new weapons, perks, and apparel when they start a successive run. Throughout levels, the player collects gold, which can be used to purchase items and restore health, and can find blessings, that provide random buffs to the player's stats. Potions discovered throughout the levels are also random and unidentified, providing unexpected effects that can help or harm the player. The game features several additional modes, with a Daily Challenge that challenges the player to complete the game with random items and stats, an arena mode to defeat as many enemies as possible. The game also features a Challenges tab for players to complete that provide additional rewards, and a local co-operative play mode.

== Reception ==
Reception

Aggregate score
Aggregator	Score
OpenCritic	60% recommend

Review scores
Publication	Score
Nintendo Life	6/10
PC Gamer (US)	84%

According to review aggregator OpenCritic, 60% of critics recommend the game, with several critics praising the game for its roguelike features and comparing it favorably to the 2008 platform game Spelunky. Destructoid praised the game for its controls, "excitingly difficult" gameplay, and "dramatically different" gameplay loop. Touch Arcade recommended the game for its difficulty, "faster tempo", and increased levels of loot. Rock Paper Shotgun highlighted the "cruel" difficulty of the game as a "wonderful challenge", finding the gameplay's "tug of war between control and chaos" to be adequately balanced, although desired more variety "in the areas and the enemies met" and found the boss battles to be "repetitive". Nintendo Life critiqued the "uninspired" design of the game, citing the "lack of storytelling" and "unremarkable visual style" leading to a "lack of memorable identity", although praising the "unpredictable" and "constantly rewarding" game loop.
