= RTGame =

Irish-Canadian YouTuber and streamer (born 1995)

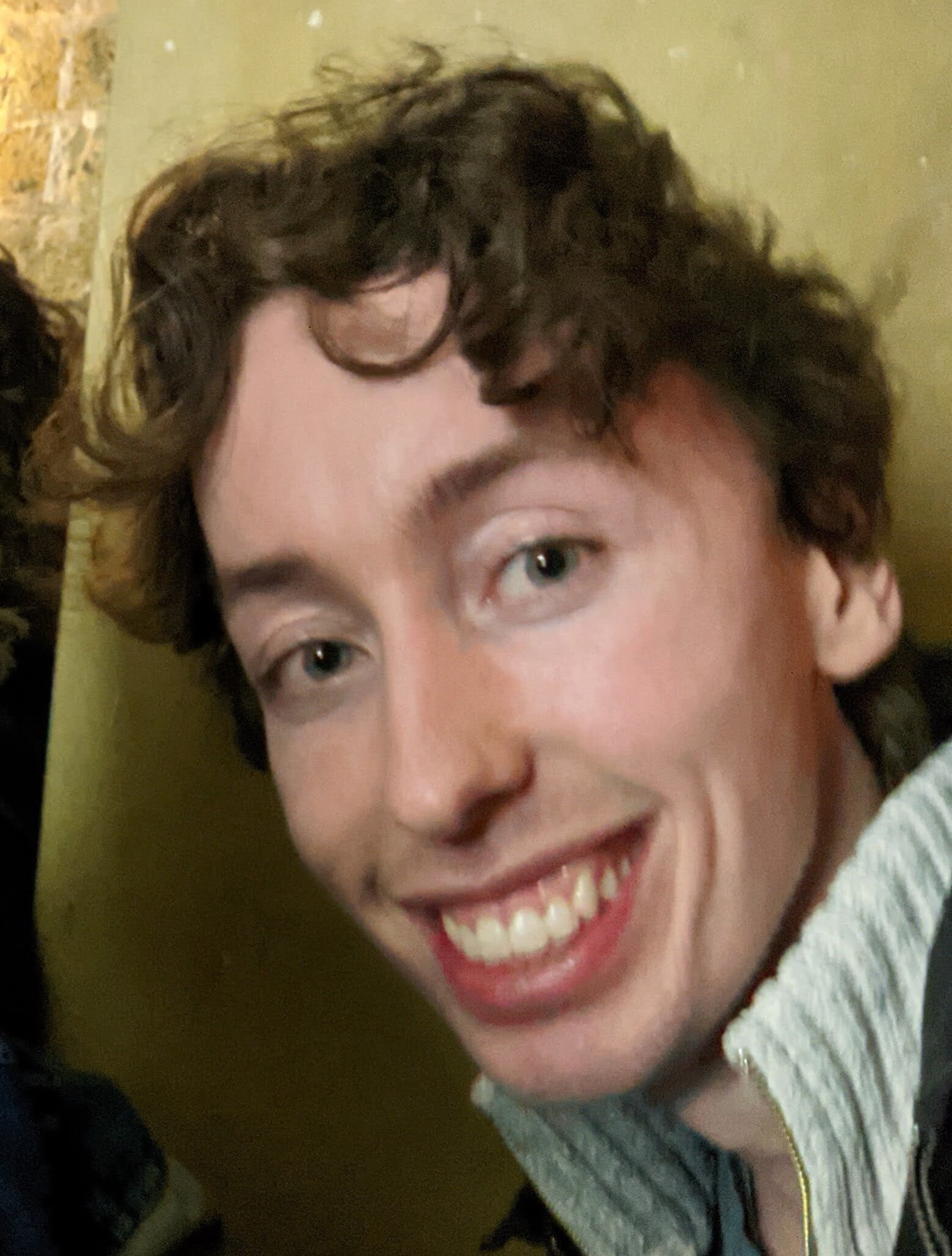
- Condren's YouTube icon Condren in 2022
- Born: Daniel Condren; 13 April 1995 (age 31); Ireland
- Occupations: YouTuber; live streamer

Twitch information
- Channel: RTGame
- Years active: 2015–present
- Genre: Gaming
- Followers: 1.2 million

YouTube information
- Channel: RTGame
- Years active: 2011–present
- Genre: Gaming
- Subscribers: 2.96 million
- Views: 1.51 billion
- Last updated: 27 June 2026

Daniel Condren (born 13 April 1995), better known as RTGame, is an Irish-Canadian YouTuber and live streamer. He is known for his humorous commentary during gameplay. He began making videos in 2011, began streaming in 2016, and experienced a surge in popularity in 2018. As of 24 December 2025, his YouTube channel has over 2.9 million subscribers, while his Twitch channel has over 1.2 million followers.

== Early life ==
Condren was born in Ireland on 13 April 1995, the son of an Irish father and Canadian mother. He holds dual Irish and Canadian citizenship. He studied at Trinity College in Dublin, where he earned a bachelor's degree in English literature in November 2017. It was during his time in college when he gained the title of 'The Drift King' after winning a college Mario Kart tournament on 3 December 2015.

== Career ==
Condren created his YouTube channel on 13 August 2011 and uploaded his first video, a Terraria Let's Play, five days later. In December 2018, he joined Yogscast's annual charity event Jingle Jam, where he helped raise $3.3 million.

His videos have included organising Minecraft building sessions for his Twitch subscribers, spending 13 days (and an in-game time of 2 days) searching for a shiny Wooloo in Pokémon Sword and Shield, and knocking out every NPC in the Hitman level of Sapienza in order to stuff them all into a meat freezer and kill the entire population with a single shot into an explosive canister (which ultimately failed when the bodies formed a "meat shield"). He was more successful in 2026, when he published a video where he attempted to crush the population of Hitman 3's Mendoza level using a large winepress, humorously dubbed in the thumbnail, "Vino Humano."

In December 2022, YouTube age-restricted some of his videos. Condren asserted that the platform was "retroactively restricting videos that violate recent policy changes." The updated guidelines gained visibility when he made a video on the topic, with YouTube set to revise the policy after being criticised for its poor communication regarding these changes.

== See also ==
- List of most-followed Twitch channels
