= The Royal Writ =

- Developer: Save Sloth Studios
- Publisher: Yogscast Games
- Platform: Windows
- Release: August 7, 2025
- Genre: Roguelike deck-builder
- Mode: Single-player

The Royal Writ is a 2025 roguelike deck-building video game developed by Save Sloth Studios and published by Yogscast Games. It was released for Windows on August 7, 2025. A darkly comedic game that combines a cartoon storybook art style with brutal combat, it follows the narcissistic King Mikolt the Second of the fantasy kingdom of Aranfold as he seeks to capture various ne'er-do-wells who threaten his kingdom. The game was praised by critics for its graphics, though they called its difficulty level punishing.

== Gameplay ==
The player starts on the game map, where they navigate between individual nodes signifying battles, events or shops. When the player enters battle, they are given a grid with 3 rows. Cards can be placed on the grid, with characters starting on the left and typically advancing one space per turn. Characters are split into attack and multiplier units, with the latter buffing the attack power of the former. Each turn, all the available characters attack the enemy's hit points. When they encounter an enemy on the field, whoever has the highest hit points survives, while the winner loses that amount in hit points. Finally, if characters reach the enemy fortifications, they take damage and can ultimately die. Both beneficial tiles and traps can appear randomly on the game field. Characters who are stopped, i.e. due to traps or the enemy fortification, can be trampled by units behind them and killed as well.

Act II introduces a new mechanic in the form of bullets, which are fired by the enemy and significantly lower the attack power of units they hit unless otherwise avoided.

== Plot ==
The game takes place in the kingdom of Aranfold, which is ruled by King Mikolt the Second, a narcissistic anthropomorphic bird. He has propagandized his own achievements, while imprisoning those who dissent with him. His royal advisers are a group of plague doctors known as the Cohort Council. At the start of Act I, Mikolt is convinced by the Council to find a bandit leader known as Robert Horka who is causing disorder and present him a royal summons. Mikolt does this by force, and the Council subsequently convince him to continue presenting summons to various other figures and institutions who are purportedly undermining his rule. Finally, they claim that his father, Mikhal the Fourth, is plotting to overthrow him. Mikolt invades Mikhal's castle and defeats him, but starts to question if he is doing the right thing. The Council reveal that they plan to usurp the kingdom themselves, kicking Mikolt off a cliff.

In Act II, Mikolt wakes up still alive and is urged by one of his last loyal subjects to fight back. Re-recruiting his subjects along the way, including Mikhal, Mikolt finally storms his castle to confront the Cohort Council. It is revealed that their plague doctor robes hide the fact that the Council are undead and are summoning demons to consume the land. Against all odds, Mikolt defeats the Council, destroying them. He retakes control of his kingdom and resolves to be a better ruler.

== Development ==
The game began as an entry for the game jam Ludum Dare before being expanded into a full, commercial game. Yogscast Games managing director Simon Byron said that the "entire team and right across the Yogscast network fell fast and hard for The Royal Writ when we first saw it", which led them to sign the game for publishing.

== Reception ==
Cosmin Vasile of Softpedia gave the game the maximum score of 5 stars, saying that he enjoyed the fantasy universe, its characters, and the game's music, while praising the gameplay as unique and calling the presentation impressive. However, he criticized the difficulty spikes during the game's bosses and the lack of voice acting, though he described it as "not a problem" given the game's non-story focus. Robin Valentine of PC Gamer said that he enjoyed the game's "scrappy underdog feel", causing players to never get complacent. However, he called some of the game's random aspects unfair, due to a "lack of clarity" in its explanations, forcing players to use trial and error. Edwin Evans-Thirlwell of Rock Paper Shotgun praised the game's visuals as "immensely jovial" and said that the game had an "interesting" set of mechanics. He described the gameplay as having "pervasive evilness", like trading characters' teeth for upgrades.
