= Wind Rose (band) =

Italian power metal band

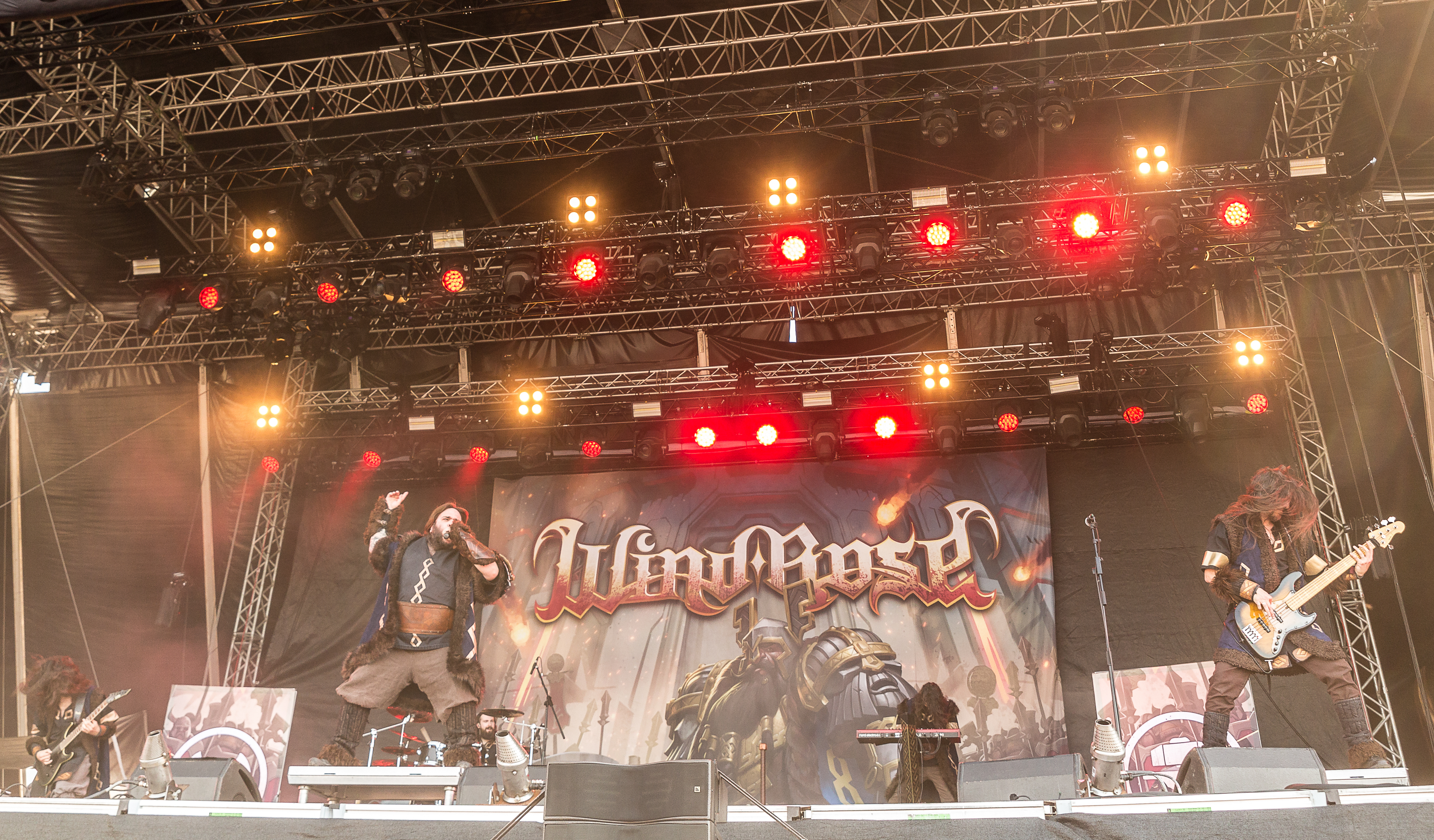
- Wind Rose at Rockharz Festival 2023

Background information
- Origin: Pisa, Tuscany, Italy
- Genres: Power metal; folk metal; symphonic metal
- Years active: 2009–present
- Label: Napalm Records
- Members: Francesco Cavalieri; Claudio Falconcini; Federico Meranda; Cristiano Bertocchi
- Past members: Alessio Consani; Daniele Visconti; Federico Gatti
- Website: www.windroseofficial.com

Wind Rose is an Italian power metal band founded in 2009 in Pisa, Tuscany, by singer Francesco Cavalieri, guitarist Claudio Falconcini and keyboardist Federico Meranda. They have released six studio albums, most recently Trollslayer in October 2024.

== History ==
In March 2010, a few months after their formation, Wind Rose released a CD called "Demo 2010" which was produced by Cristiano Bertocchi. On 28 August 2012 Wind Rose released their first full-length Shadows Over Lothadruin via Bakerteam Records (secondary division of Scarlet Records).

Between 2013 and 2014, they performed a number of promotional live shows in Europe directly supporting Wintersun, Finntroll and Epica. Cristiano Bertocchi joined the band as bass player during 2014 before the band went to the studio to record the second full-length album.

In February 2015, they took part in Eluveitie's Origins European tour and their second studio album Wardens of the West Wind was released by Scarlet Records. In October they also played as support for Ensiferum's Spanish shows during their One Man Army European tour. After these shows, Wind Rose dedicated the entire year 2016 to writing new material. In 2017, the band signed a deal with Inner Wound Recordings for their third album Stonehymn. It was released in May. The first video to be released was "The Wolves' Call" followed by "To Erebor" which expanded the band's popularity, reaching millions on Facebook and YouTube. Wind Rose was then invited to participate in large metal festivals such as Bloodstock (United Kingdom) and Masters of Rock (Czech Republic).

In January 2018, the band was asked to tour Japan with Ensiferum, and in April and May 2018 they joined the Path to Glory European tour with Ensiferum and Ex Deo. In December 2018, Wind Rose announced a deal with Napalm Records and the recording of a new album. On 6 June 2019 Wind Rose released the first single on Napalm: "Diggy Diggy Hole", a song originally written and performed by gaming YouTubers The Yogscast. The album Wintersaga was released on 27 September 2019.

On 8 March 2022, the band announced their fifth studio album, Warfront, which was released on 10 June 2022.

On 11 July 2024, the band announced their sixth studio album, Trollslayer, which was released on 4 October 2024.

== Musical style ==
Wind Rose plays a combination of primarily power metal and folk metal accompanied by orchestration and vocal harmonies, with lyrical themes inspired by the works of J. R. R. Tolkien, especially Tolkien's Dwarves, from which the band also gets their aesthetic. Because of this, the band's sound has been referred to as "dwarven metal".

== Band members ==
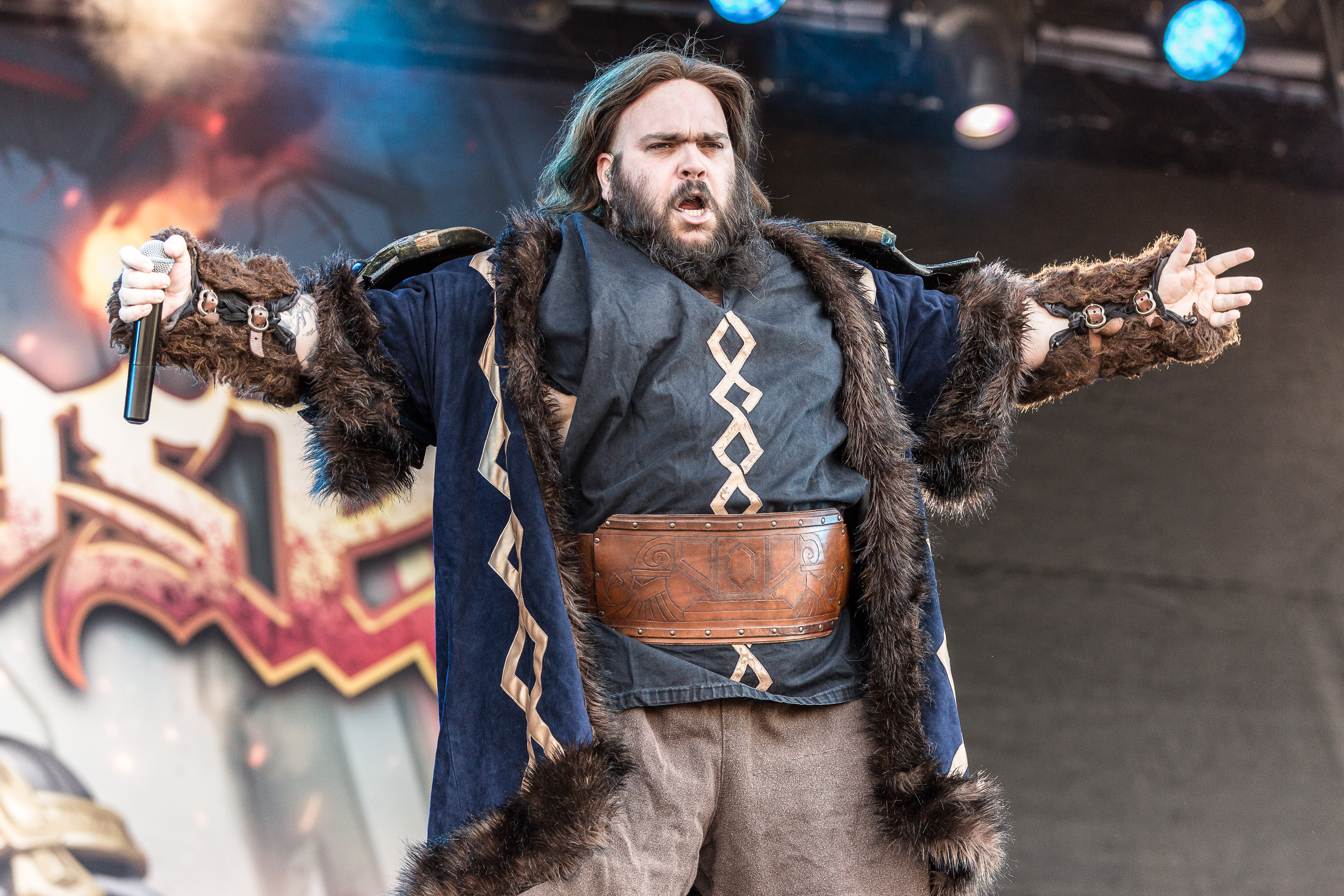
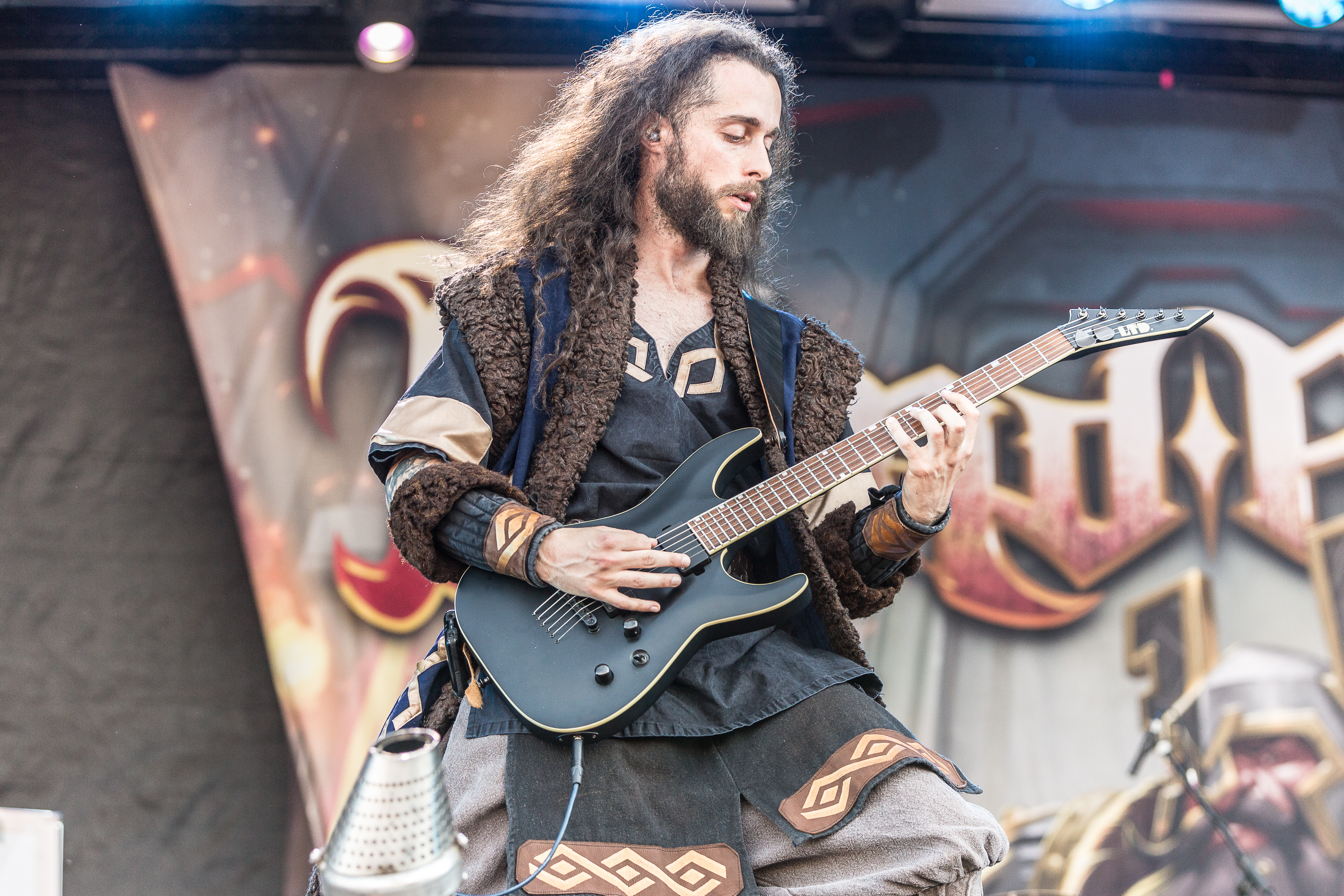
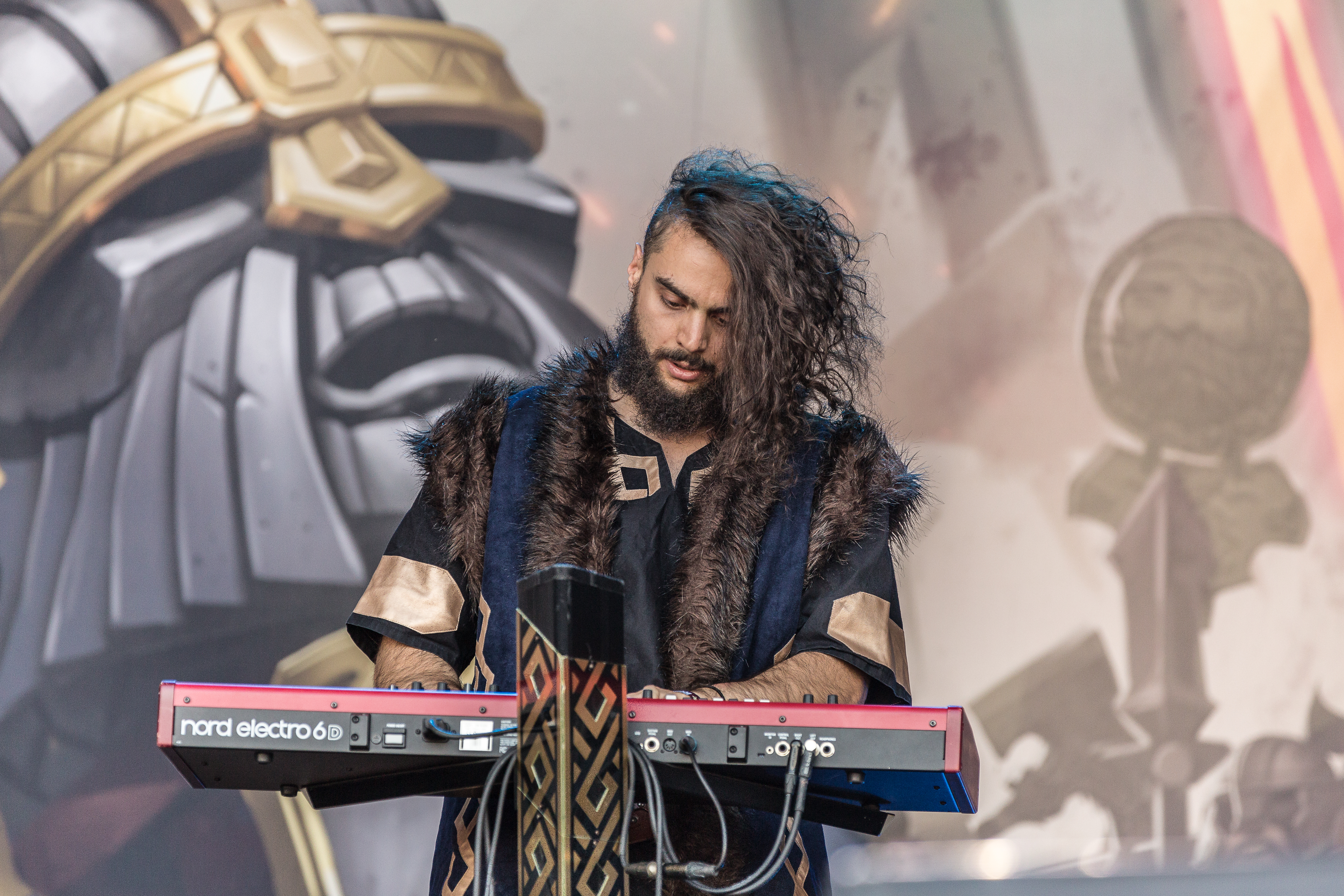
Francesco Cavalieri, Claudio Falconcini and Federico Meranda, the founding members of Wind Rose

=== Current ===
- Francesco Cavalieri – lead vocals (2009–present)
- Claudio Falconcini – guitars, backing vocals (2009–present)
- Federico Meranda – keyboards (2009–present)
- Cristiano Bertocchi – bass, backing vocals (2014–present)

=== Former ===
- Alessio Consani – bass (2009–2013)
- Daniele Visconti – drums, backing vocals (2009–2017)
- Federico Gatti – drums (2018–2026)

== Discography ==
=== Studio albums ===
- Shadows Over Lothadruin (2012)
- Wardens of the West Wind (2015)
- Stonehymn (2017)
- Wintersaga (2019)
- Warfront (2022)
- Trollslayer (2024)

=== Singles ===
- "The Returning Race" (2017)
- "To Erebor" (2017)
- "Diggy Diggy Hole" (2019)
- "Drunken Dwarves" (2019)
- "Wintersaga" (2019)
- "Diggy Diggy Hole (Dance Remix)" (2020)
- "We Were Warriors" (2020)
- "Gates of Ekrund" (2022)
- "Together We Rise" (2022)
- "Fellows of the Hammer" (2022)
- "Rock and Stone" (2024)
- "To Be a Dwarf" (2024)
- "The Great Feast Underground" (2024)
