= Hat Films =

English comedy and gaming YouTube channel

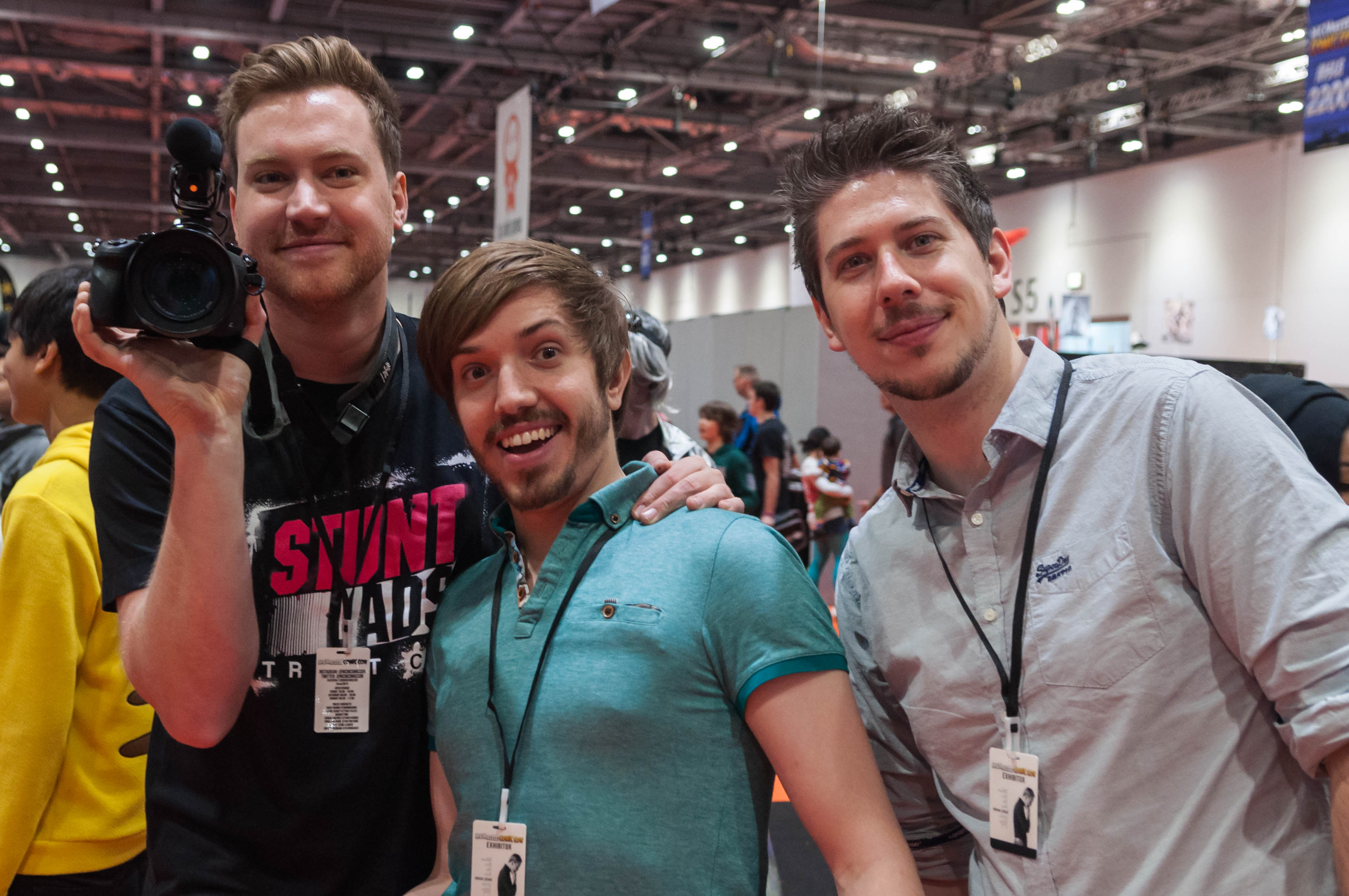
- Hat Films at Comic Con 2015. Left to right: Alex Smith, Chris Trott, Ross Hornby
- Other names: Haat Films (former); Pleasureville (former band name); Mr Sam & The Dednutz (current band name)

YouTube information
- Channel: Hat Films
- Years active: 2009–present
- Genres: Gaming; comedy; vlog; Let's Play
- Subscribers: 847k (Hat Films); 137k (Hat Gaming)
- Views: 575.5 million (Hat Films); 43.9 million (Hat Gaming)
- Last updated: 20th August 2026
- Website: hatfilms.co.uk

Hat Films is an English comedy and gaming YouTube channel comprising Ross Hornby, Alex Smith and Chris Trott. Since 2014, they have been part of The Yogscast network.

Whilst much of their early success came from the creation of several official Minecraft trailers, their gaming and vlog content makes up the majority of their channel, including games such as Grand Theft Auto, Minecraft and Rust. They are also film-makers and musicians, with their videos often including impromptu a cappella singing. They are also known for their music releases, such as their 2015 charity album Population: You, which peaked at #5 on the Billboard Comedy Albums chart.

They are the creators of the YouTube comedy series Stunt Lads, and were featured in the book Yogscast: The Diggy Diggy Book.

== Stunt Lads ==
Stunt Lads is a machinima series created in Grand Theft Auto V. While covering the work of Hat Films, Vice reported in April 2016 that Stunt Lads was created by Hat Films "entirely in the Rockstar Editor," a digital media editing software. The report further mentioned that the idea of Stunt Lads "came from a collective interest in light-hearted, slapstick fare and an inability to perform stunts to the same standard as some of the online scene's dedicated crews." Playground.ru, the Russian gaming information site, featured a review of Hat Films and their work on Stunt Lads in July 2015.

== Minecraft trailers ==
Hat Films have worked with Mojang and Microsoft Studios, among others, on the official Minecraft update trailers for console and PC editions of the game. They have also worked on the official opening videos for Minecon. Hat Films first came into contact with Mojang in the early stages of their career, while the group was asking for permission to record Let's Play content of the game.

== Music ==
Hat Films are also known for their music releases. They have independently released music alongside videos, and later released music through the Yogscast. Their independent releases include instrumentals they produced for Minecraft trailers, music from their Filfy' Animals series, and other releases.

More recently, they participate in the annual Yogscast Jingle Jam charity livestream event, where they produce and release a charity album. Their debut, Population: You, reached #5 on the Billboard Comedy Albums chart in 2015. Follow-ups to this album include Destination Drumpf in 2016, Neon Musk in 2017, and Secret Santa in 2018. In addition to this, a single from Destination Drumpf was released in 2017; a studio remaster of "Shipping and Receiving".

Hat Films have also released three albums containing their fans' remixes of songs from the charity albums; Population: US (2015), Destination Drumpf – The Remixes (2016), Neon Musk – Remix Collection (2017) and Secret Santa – The Remixes (2018).

As a band Hat Films have performed under the name Pleasureville, or more recently Mr Sam & The Dednutz, along with their editor Craig Frost, Yogscast audio engineer Sam Gibbs and artist Rhiannon Gower.

== Additional Channels ==
Hat Films also upload YouTube videos on additional channels, Hat Gaming and The Hat Chat Podcast which both host content from livestreams and podcasts respectively.

== Discography ==
=== Studio albums ===
- Hatventures Vol.1 - Filfy' Tunes (2011)
- Hat Films Presents: The Trailers Vol.1 (2012)

Charity albums

- Pleasureville – Population: You (2015) – US #5
- Destination Drumpf (2016)
- Neon Musk (2017)
- Secret Santa (2018)
- Mr Sam & The Dednutz – Tuesday Night (2019)

=== Remix albums ===
- Pleasureville – Population: US (2015)
- Destination Drumpf – The Remixes (2016)
- Neon Musk – Remix Collection (2017)
- Secret Santa – The Remixes (2018)
- Mr Sam & The Dednutz – Remixing on a Tuesday Night (2019)

=== EPs ===
- Filfy' Animals, Volume 1 (2012)
- Witch Hunt EP (2012)
- Holiday Bundle (2012)
- Hatventures – From Ashes (2013)
- Filfy Mods - Pixelmon EP (2013)

=== Singles ===
- 2012: "Pixel Dust"
- 2012: "Such a Filthy Day"
- 2013: "Evasion"
- 2013: "Sad For Good"
- 2014: "The Onesie Anthem"
- 2015: "The Stunt Lads Show Theme"
- 2016: "Flat!"
- 2017: "Shipping & Receiving"
- 2018: "I'm a Magical Butterfly"
- 2019: "Yogplague"
