= Call of Duty Endowment =

Military veterans support organization

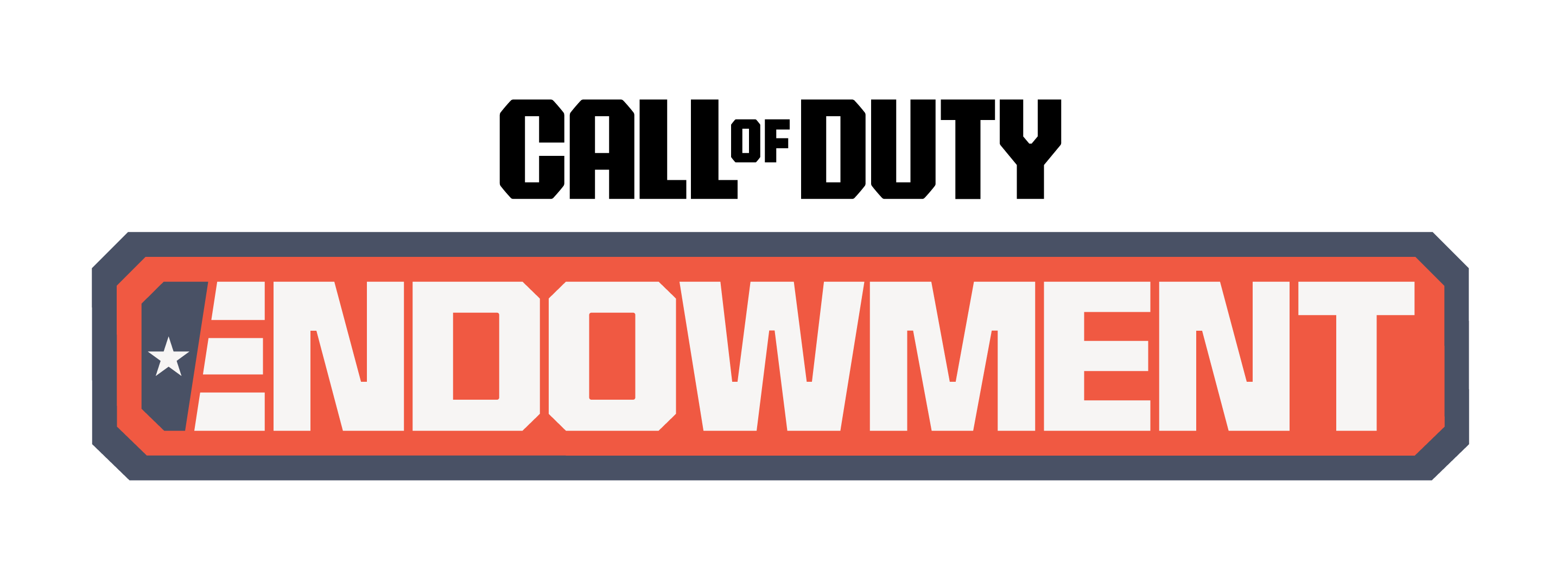
- Formation: 2009
- Type: 501(c)(3) non-profit organization
- Purpose: Veterans' affairs
- Headquarters: Santa Monica, California
- Region served: United States, United Kingdom
- Key people: Dan Goldenberg, executive director; Bobby Kotick, founder and co-chairman; General James L. Jones, USMC (Ret.), co-chairman
- Website: www.callofdutyendowment.org

The Call of Duty Endowment (C.O.D.E.) is a 501(c)(3) non-profit foundation co-created by Bobby Kotick, the former CEO of Activision Blizzard, and General James L. Jones, Jr., a retired United States Marine Corps four-star general, to help U.S., and later, U.K. military veterans find high-quality careers. The Endowment funds non-profit organizations that help former service members transition to high quality civilian careers after their military service and raises awareness of the value veterans bring to the workplace. The name of the Endowment is a reference to the video game series Call of Duty.

Primary partners receiving Endowment funding today include AMVETS (since 2011), Vet Jobs (since 2013), Hire Heroes USA (since 2010), JVS SoCal (since 2014), Operation: Job Ready Veterans (since 2015), The Forces Employment Charity (since 2017), Still Serving Veterans (since 2011), US VETS (since 2013), Veterans Inc. (since 2013), and Walking With The Wounded (since 2017).

== History ==
2009–2011

The Call of Duty Endowment was born in 2009 from a conversation between Activision Blizzard CEO, Bobby Kotick, and former VA Secretary, Jim Nicholson. Kotick mentioned that a philanthropic foundation was planning on building a performing arts center on the grounds of the VA facility in West Los Angeles, to which Secretary Nicholson replied: “That’s stupid. Our real priorities are finding jobs for veterans and improving their healthcare. I think if we could redirect people's energies and efforts for job creation, that would be a better use of capital and better for veterans.”

The conversation inspired Kotick to learn more about unemployment and underemployment among U.S. veterans, discovering that 50,000 of the 150,000 service members returning to civilian life at the time couldn't find jobs. Kotick co-founded the Call of Duty Endowment with General Jones on Veteran's Day in 2009, with the mission to place veterans into high-quality careers.

The Endowment made its first grant of $25,000 in 2010. From 2009 to 2011, the Endowment offered several small and medium-sized grants to nonprofit organizations, but the board became concerned that they could not measure the impact of the grants and slowed the organization's grant-making.

2012

In 2012, the Endowment funded the placement of its 1,000th veteran into a high-quality job and the organization grew to include several more distinguished military officials as part of its advisory board and General James L. Jones was formally introduced as co-founder of the Call of Duty Endowment. A former National Security Advisor to the President of the United States, European Command/NATO Commander, and Commandant of the United States Marine Corps, General Jones brought over 40 years of experience in military and government affairs to the Call of Duty Endowment.

2013

In 2013, CAPT Dan Goldenberg, US Navy(ret.) a veteran and experienced business executive, was hired as executive director. The Endowment changed its strategy to only support organizations with a proven track record of placing veterans into high-quality jobs. The same year, the Endowment started the "Seal of Distinction" grant program, which identifies and recognizes non-profit organizations that are successful in placing veterans in quality jobs. The Endowment worked with Deloitte to develop a rigorous assessment process to measure the effectiveness, efficiency and integrity of the nonprofits that apply. Organizations that earn the Seal of Distinction received a $30,000 unrestricted grant to use in their veteran job placement activities and are then eligible for future restricted funding, typically averaging more than $500,000 annually.

2014

The Endowment funds the placement of more than 20,000 veterans cumulatively and, for the first time, more than 10,000 in one year, due to the Seal of Distinction vetting model's effectiveness. The Endowment's first in-game fundraiser, the now iconic Badass George Washington Xbox Theme utilizing art by Jason Heuser, was launched in August.

2015

In partnership with Activision Publishing Studio Treyarch, the Endowment launched the “Be a Zombie in Call of Duty” campaign to raise funds and awareness and wins its first national recognition, Engage for Good's Halo Award. Treyarch further innovates by launching the first in-game personalization pack to benefit the Endowment, Call of Duty®: Black Ops III's C.O.D.E. Warriors Pack.

2016

In 2016, the Endowment funded the placement of more than 30,000 veterans cumulatively. Activision Publishing Studio Treyarch launched the Call of Duty®: Black Ops III –C.O.D.E. Valor Pack and Activision Publishing Studio Infinity Ward created the Call of Duty®: Infinite Warfare –C.O.D.E. Courage Pack.

2017

In 2017, the Endowment announced that it would expand its efforts to include ex-forces members in the United Kingdom. RFEA (now The Forces Employment Charity) and Walking With The Wounded were the first U.K. organizations to be awarded the Seal of Distinction and related grants.The Endowment also worked with ZipRecruiter on a policy paper entitled “Challenges on the Homefront: Underemployment Hits Veterans Hard,” and funded the placement of more than 40,000 veterans cumulatively.

For the first time, the Endowment participated in the NFL's My Cause, My Cleats program, partnering with two Pittsburgh Steelers players: former Army Ranger Alejandro Villenueva and Le'Veon Bell. Activision Publishing studio, Raven Software created the Call of Duty®: Modern Warfare Remastered –C.O.D.E. Brass Pack. Activision Publishing Studio Treyarch launched the Call of Duty®: Black Ops III –C.O.D.E. Double Duty Pack. Activision Publishing Studio Sledgehammer Games published the Call of Duty ®: WWII –C.O.D.E. Bravery Pack.

2018

In 2018, the Endowment officially launched in the United Kingdom to help Ex Forces find high-quality jobs while hitting the milestone of placing more than 50,000 veterans cumulatively. Activision Publishing studio, Sledgehammer Games launched the Call of Duty®: WWII –C.O.D.E. Fear Not Pack in partnership with artist Jason Heuser who returned to also create the Fear Not PlayStation Dynamic Theme. Activision Publishing studio Treyarch published the Call of Duty®: Black Ops 4 –C.O.D.E. Salute Pack. The Endowment partners with the Pittsburgh Steelers' wide receiver JuJu Smith-Schuster for the NFL's My Cause, My Cleats.

2019

In 2019, the Endowment funded the placement of more than 60,000 veterans cumulatively and partnered with the U.S. Army Esports team to launch the C.O.D.E. Bowl, an event that would grow to become the first-ever transatlantic military esports tournament to drive awareness of the veteran employment cause . It was the biggest year yet for in-game Endowment fundraisers. Activision Publishing studio Treyarch launched the Call of Duty®: Black Ops 4 (Blackout) –C.O.D.E. Jump Pack. Additionally, famed Marine Corps Veteran and artist Max Uriarte (who created Terminal Lance) developed the Night Raid PlayStation Theme. Activision Publishing Studio Infinity Ward also published the Call of Duty®: Modern Warfare –C.O.D.E. Defender Pack.

The Endowment launched the #HireHonor campaign to celebrate its 10th anniversary. The campaign featured a call to action video from former U.S. Secretary of Defense, General James Mattis. General Mattis urged the video's viewers to honor veterans by hiring them.

Additionally, in two firsts, Activision Publishing Studio Beenox created the first in-game item to benefit the Endowment outside of Call of Duty–the Crash™ Team Racing Nitro-Fueled –C.O.D.E. Firehawk Kart, and the brand new Call of Duty®: Mobile team got in on the action with their C.O.D.E. Honor Pack.

2020

In the midst of the COVID-19 Pandemic, great need surfaced and enormous progress was made. The Endowment funded the placement of more than 80,000 veterans cumulatively. Activision Publishing Studio Infinity Ward launched the Call of Duty®: Modern Warfare –C.O.D.E. Fearless Pack, inspired by the heroic actions of Medal of Honor Recipient CPT Florent “Flo” Groberg, U.S. Army(ret.). Call of Duty®: Mobile launched the C.O.D.E. Freedom Pack. Activision Publishing Studio Vicarious Visions created the Tony Hawk Pro Skater 1 and 2 –C.O.D.E. United Pack. Additionally, Activision Publishing studio Treyarch published the Call of Duty®: Black Ops Cold War –C.O.D.E. Challenger Pack. The Endowment also partnered with Arizona Cardinals quarterback Kyler Murray for My Cause, My Cleats.

2021

In 2021, the Endowment funded the placement of more than 90,000 veterans cumulatively. Helene Imperiale is appointed the Endowment's first marketing director. During Military Appreciation Month, the Endowment focused on chronic unemployment and underemployment amongst former military medics, and published a seminal policy paper. The Endowment also launched the C.O.D.E. Revival Challenge, and partnered with Activision Publishing studio Treyarch to create the Call of Duty®: Black Ops Cold War –C.O.D.E. Battle Doc Pack. Additionally, Sledgehammer Games published the Call of Duty®: Vanguard –C.O.D.E. Timeless Pack, and Call of Duty®: Mobile created their own version of the C.O.D.E. Timeless Pack. The brand new U.S. Space Force shocked an audience of more than 1 million by defeating eight other U.S. and U.K. military branches to win C.O.D.E. Bowl II.

2022

In 2022 the Endowment achieved its long-term goal of 100,000 placements and ended the year having funded the placement of more than 110,000 veterans cumulatively while publishing a policy paper on the lessons learned through its work, and winning six national awards. In partnership with the Call of Duty®: Warzone Team, the Endowment launched Call of Duty Veteruns, the first-ever in-game charity run to raise awareness and funds for veteran job placement–3.4 million players participated. The C.O.D.E. Bowl trophy was launched into space with a challenge from the U.S. Space Force to “Come and Get It!”—the Royal Air Force did just that, defeating all other U.S. and U.K. military branches to bring home the C.O.D.E. Bowl III trophy in front of more than 2 million viewers.

Call of Duty®: Mobile launched the C.O.D.E. Timeless Pack, and Infinity Ward published the Call of Duty®: Modern Warfare® II and Call of Duty®: Warzone™ 2.0 –C.O.D.E. Protector Pack. The Endowment partnered with the LA Ram's wide receiver Cooper Kupp for My Cause, My Cleats.

2023

In 2023, the Endowment won a record nine national awards, and announced that they had reached one million followers across its social media channels. During May's Military Appreciation Month, the Endowment published a policy paper on Women Veteran Employment, and also partnered with the Call of Duty team and country music duo War Hippies on the “Loot For Good” activation in Warzone 2.0. Infinity Ward launched the Call of Duty®: Modern Warfare® II –C.O.D.E. Perseverance Pack and the Call of Duty®: Modern Warfare® II and Call of Duty®: Warzone™ 2.0 –C.O.D.E. Valkyrie Pack that honors women veterans. Leading up to C.O.D.E. Bowl IV on October 5, the C.O.D.E. Bowl trophy went on a #RoyalRoadTrip of London with the C.O.D.E. Bowl III winners, the Royal Air Force. In their C.O.D.E. Bowl debut, the Royal Canadian Air Force, the first and only Canadian team to participate in the event, took home the C.O.D.E. Bowl trophy on October 5. The event followed Call of Duty® NEXT, the Call of Duty®: Modern Warfare III showcase event. During the event, the Endowment announced the Call of Duty Endowment (C.O.D.E.) Warrior Pack for Call of Duty® Modern Warfare III. The pack was inspired by and created in close collaboration with a retired U.S. Navy SEAL.

2024

Sledgehammer Games created the Call of Duty®: Modern Warfare® III - C.O.D.E. Knight Recon: Tracer Pack - the first Endowment tracer bundle and launched while also launching an in-game event challenge titled - “U Assist Veterans.” Call of Duty®: Mobile launched the C.O.D.E. Regulator Pack, the first Endowment pack on mobile to feature an operator. Activision and the Endowment celebrated its impact and ongoing commitment to veteran employment in the U.K. by signing the Armed Forces Covenant. Treyarch created and launched the Call of Duty®: Black Ops 6 - C.O.D.E. Endeavour: Tracer Pack designed in collaboration with the U.K. Special Operations veterans and ThruDark founders that pays homage to the Special Boat Service teams, along with another first, a co-branded merchandise line. The Endowment also received fundraising support from Pilot Company, USAA, Monster Energy, Little Caesars, Corsair, and Polaris, as well as operational support from Activision, Microsoft, and Sony.

== Impact ==
Veterans often face barriers to transitioning to civilian careers because their military experience does not transfer easily to civilian jobs. The Call of Duty Endowment funds organizations that help veterans with resume preparation, career coaching, mock interviews, and other skill-building to help them enter the civilian workforce. The Endowment also works with employers to show that hiring veterans makes good business sense and that veterans make valuable additions to the workplace.

In 2018, the Endowment announced that it reached its goal of funding the placement of 50,000 veterans into meaningful employment a year ahead of the 2019 deadline it had set. Then the Endowment set a new goal of placing 100,000 U.S. and U.K. veterans into jobs by 2024. The organization reached its goal to place 100,000 veterans in 2022, two years ahead of schedule. Now the Endowment is focused on placing the next 100,000 veterans.

In 2024, the Endowment placed 19,027 veterans into jobs, more than any previous year, making tremendous progress against their latest goal of getting 200,000 veterans back to work by 2030. To date, the Endowment has donated more than $90 million to the cause, funding the placement of more than 150,000 veterans into high-quality jobs. In 2025, the Endowment's Seal of Distinction model of veteran job placement cost 1/15 the amount per veteran placement that it costs the U.S. Department of Labor.[15] In 2025, the Endowment reported an average cost per placement of $628, and stated that 19% of the veterans placed were women, compared to 10% of the veteran population. The starting salary for veterans placed by the Endowment in 2024 was over $75,000, with a 89% 6-month retention rate.

== Funding ==
The Call of Duty Endowment is funded with donations from Activision Blizzard, gamers, corporate partners and individual donors. Activision Blizzard funds all of the operating costs for the Endowment, so 100% of donations go directly to grantees to fund veteran job placements.

The Endowment raises money through promotions and in-game merchandise in the Call of Duty game series. It also partners with retailers such as GameStop, which have historically donated a portion of games sold to the Endowment and raised funds through in-store donation programs, and through efforts with celebrities such as actor Josh Duhamel and Green Bay Packers running back Aaron Jones.

In 2019, the U.S. Army Esports team partnered with the Endowment to launch the CODE Bowl, an event where teams of popular streamers and members of the Army Esports team competed in Call of Duty: Modern Warfare to raise awareness about the value of military service. Streamers also used their channels to raise funds for the Endowment.

In May 2020, Activision Blizzard donated $2 million to the Call of Duty Endowment to help fund emerging needs during the COVID-19 pandemic.
