= U.S. Army Esports =

Esports team sponsored by the United States Army

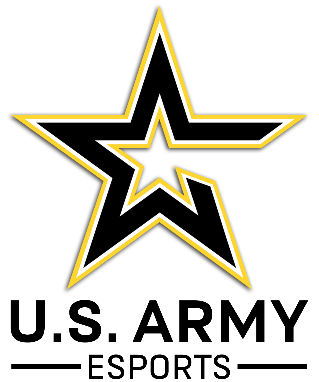
- Divisions: Call of Duty, Counter-Strike: Global Offensive, Fortnite, League of Legends, Overwatch, Magic the Gathering, Halo Infinite, Rainbow Six Siege
- Founded: November 2018
- Head coach: Marcus Lovejoy (Halo Infinite)
- Parent group: United States Army

U.S. Army Esports is an esports team sponsored by the United States Army. The team, which consists of active duty and reserve personnel, was announced in November 2018 as a public outreach initiative operating within the Fort Knox, Kentucky-based Army Marketing and Engagement Team. Games in which the team announced it would compete include video games such as Call of Duty, Counter-Strike: Global Offensive, Fortnite, League of Legends, and Overwatch, as well as tabletop games such as Magic: The Gathering and Warhammer 40,000.

In 2020, U.S. military esports activities garnered widespread media attention after a successful legal battle led by the ACLU forced them to lift the bans on the people they had removed for discussing war crimes committed by U.S. armed forces.

== History ==
The U.S. Army Esports team was founded in November 2018. After the Army missed its recruiting goal for the first time in 13 years, the team was founded in an effort to modernize outreach efforts.

U.S. Army Esports promotional video

In 2022, the team finished second in the inaugural Armed Forces Sports Championship in Halo Infinite that was played against the other U.S. service branches.

== First Amendment concerns ==
The official U.S. Army Esports Discord server and Twitch became the target of activists who began to post comments and memes referencing war crimes committed by the United States. This led to moderators of the Discord server temporarily restricting people from joining, and a number of Twitch users being banned from the U.S. Army Esports Twitch channel.

The American Civil Liberties Union and other organizations have claimed that the banning of Twitch users from the channel is a violation of the First Amendment to the United States Constitution. An official spokesperson for the U.S. Army noted that users were subsequently banned after trolling and harassing members of the team; however, some bans were lifted.

== Fake giveaway accusations ==
The team has been accused of promoting fake giveaways on Twitch by providing links that they claimed would enter viewers into a giveaway for an Xbox Elite Series 2 controller, but rather redirected viewers to a recruitment form. Twitch asked the channel to remove those links, with which the Esports channel complied. The team noted that they had given away ten controllers, gaming stations, and chairs in the past year.

== Return to Twitch ==
In response to the mass criticism, the U.S. Army Esports team announced on 22 July 2020 that they would halt activity on Twitch and would likely resume activity in spring 2021. However, the team returned to Twitch on 14 August 2020.

On 22 July 2020, U.S. Representative Alexandria Ocasio-Cortez filed a draft amendment to the House Appropriations Bill that would prohibit the U.S. military from "[maintaining] a presence on Twitch or any video game, e-sports, or live-streaming platform." This amendment has since been defeated however, with the final vote being 292–126 against it and 13 members abstaining from voting.
