= Compulsion loop =

Habitual chain of human activities

The compulsion loop in video games

A compulsion loop, reward loop or core loop is a habitual chain of activities that a user may feel compelled to repeat. Typically, this loop is designed to create a neurochemical reward in the user such as the release of dopamine.

Compulsion loops are deliberately used in video game design as an extrinsic motivation for players, but may also result from other activities that create such loops, intentionally or not, such as gambling addiction and Internet addiction disorder.

== Basis ==
The understanding of the motivations of compulsion loops came out of experiments performed on laboratory animals in operant conditioning chamber or a "Skinner box", where the animals are given both positive and negative stimuli for performing certain actions, such as providing food by pressing a lever. Besides demonstrating that animals would prefer positive rewards and thus learned to trigger the corresponding lever, B. F. Skinner found that the effects of random rewards and variable time between awards also became a factor towards how quickly the animals learned the rules of the positive reinforcement system. Ongoing research has shown that dopamine, synthesized in the animal brain, is a key neurotransmitter involved in this process; disabling the ability for receptors to react to dopamine in animal studies can impact how rapidly the animals can be conditioned.

Applying these principles to gaming, a compulsion loop creates a three-part cycle: the anticipation of receiving some reward, the activity that must be completed to receive that reward, and the act of finally obtaining the reward. From a neuroscience aspect, it is believed that the anticipation phase is where dopamine is created by the human brain, while it is released upon obtaining the reward. Dopamine creates feelings of pleasure in the brain and drives motivation, and while the neurotransmitter itself is not addictive, can lead to addictive behavior as the user desires to experience the further dopamine release.

== In game design ==
A core or compulsion loop is any repetitive gameplay cycle that is designed to keep the player engaged with the game. Players perform an action, are rewarded, another possibility opens and the cycle repeats. A compulsion loop may be distinguished further from a core loop; while many games have a core loop of activities that a player may repeat over and over again, such as combat within a role-playing game, a compulsion loop is particularly designed to guide the player into anticipation for the potential reward from specific activities. The compulsion loop can be strengthened by adding a variable ratio schedule, where each response has a chance of producing a reward. Another strategy is an avoidance schedule, where the players work to postpone a negative consequence. Without a lack of meaningful reward, the player may eventually no longer engage with the game, causing extinction of the player population for a game. Particularly for freemium titles, where players can opt to spend real-world money for in-game boosts, extinction is undesirable so the game is designed around a near-perpetual compulsion loop alongside frequent addition of new content.

Compulsion loops in video games can be established through several means. One common approach is to show the player a "baseline" for how powerful the player-character could become, such as starting the game in an advanced power state and shortly stripping the character of those advancements and having the player rebuild the character to that state, or to show them a powerful non-player character that their starting character could eventually build towards. Another approach is through the difficulty curve of the game, making enemies stronger as the player-characters advance deeper into the game, and requiring the player to spend time to improve the character whether through new gear, abilities, or the player's own performance to progress. In multiplayer games, players may also be simply driven by envy towards other players that have more powerful characters. Some loops can rely on the concept of withdrawal, in that the player may get to a state in the game they are content with, but by some means, the game shows the player a potential of where they could be by improving, and anticipating the player to feel like they are lacking something and will return to engage in the game.

A well-known example of a compulsion loop in video games is the Monster Hunter series by Capcom. Players take the role of a monster hunter, using a variety of weapons and armor to slay or trap the creatures. By doing so, they gain monster parts and other loot that can be used to craft new weapons and equipment that is typically stronger than their previous gear, which they can use to face more difficult monsters that provide parts for even better gear. The strength of the loop is aided by the random nature of the drops (a variable ratio), sometimes requiring players to repeat quests several times to get the right parts. A compulsion loop may involve two or different gameplay modes that feed each other. For example, in Cult of the Lamb, one half of the game is a roguelike hack-n-slash system which the player can use to gather resources, which are then used in the game's other half, a settlement management simulation. By advancing the settlement, the player can unlock more powerful weapons and abilities in the hack-and-slash and reach more difficult areas required to obtain rarer resources needed for further settlement advancement.

Another type of compulsion loop are offered through many games in the form of a loot box or similar term, depending on the game. Loot boxes are earned progressively by continuing to play the game; this may be as a reward for winning a match, purchasable through in-game currency that one earns in game, or through microtransactions with real-world funds. Loot boxes contain a fixed number of randomly chosen in-game items, with at least one guaranteed to be of a higher rarity than the others. For many games, these items are simply customization options for the player's avatar that has no direct impact on gameplay, but they may also include gameplay-related items, or additional in-game currency. Loot boxes work under the psychology principle of variable rate reinforcement, which causes dopamine production at higher rates due to the unpredictable nature of the reward in contrast to fixed rewards. In many games, opening a loot box is accompanied by visuals and audios to heighten the excitement and further this response. Overall, a loot box system can encourage the player to continue to play the game, and potentially spend real-world funds to gain loot boxes immediately. Controversy arose in 2018 around loot boxes with several experts, governments, and concerned citizens fearing that loot boxes could lead to gambling, particularly in youth, and some governments took step to ban loot box practices that involved real-world funds.

Compulsion loops can be used as a replacement for game content, especially in grinding and freemium game experience models. The opposite of rewarding predictable, tedious and repetitive tasks are reward action contingency based systems, where players overcome game challenges with clear signals of progress.

== Psychological effects ==
Encouraging players to return to the game world can lead to video game addiction if not careful. Internet addiction disorder can also result from a compulsion loop created by users in checking email, websites, and social media to see the results of their actions. A common concern related to compulsion loops in video games is a potential for violent video games to lead to violent behavior even though the American Psychological Association (APA) had asserted in 2019 that there is no direct connection between violent video games and real-world violent behavior, some still fear that compulsion loops in these types of games can help to reinforce violence tendencies.
