= List of cities in the Saarland by population =

The following list sorts all cities and communes in the German state of the Saarland with a population of more than 10,000. As of May 15, 2022, 40 cities fulfill this criterion and are listed here. This list refers only to the population of individual municipalities within their defined limits, which does not include other municipalities or suburban areas within urban agglomerations.

== List ==
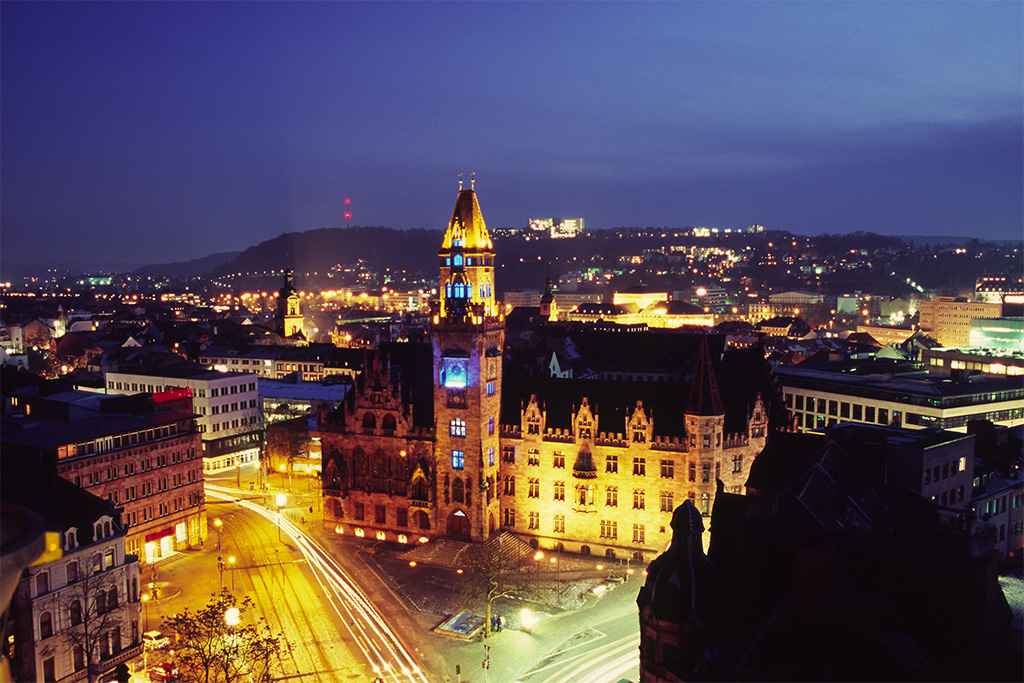
Saarbrücken

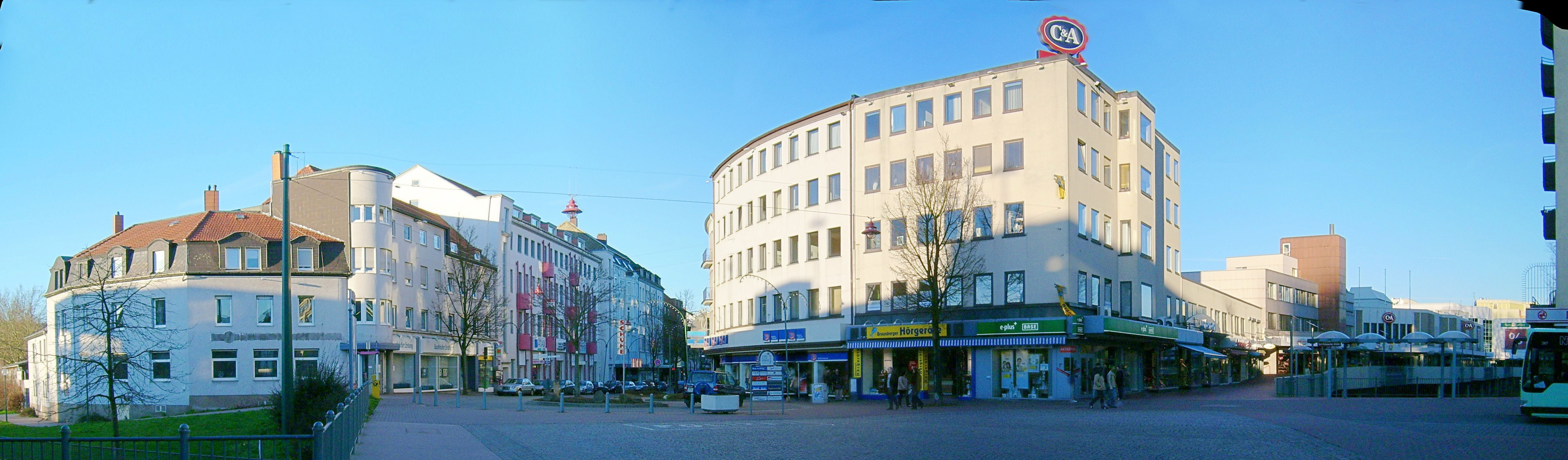
Neunkirchen

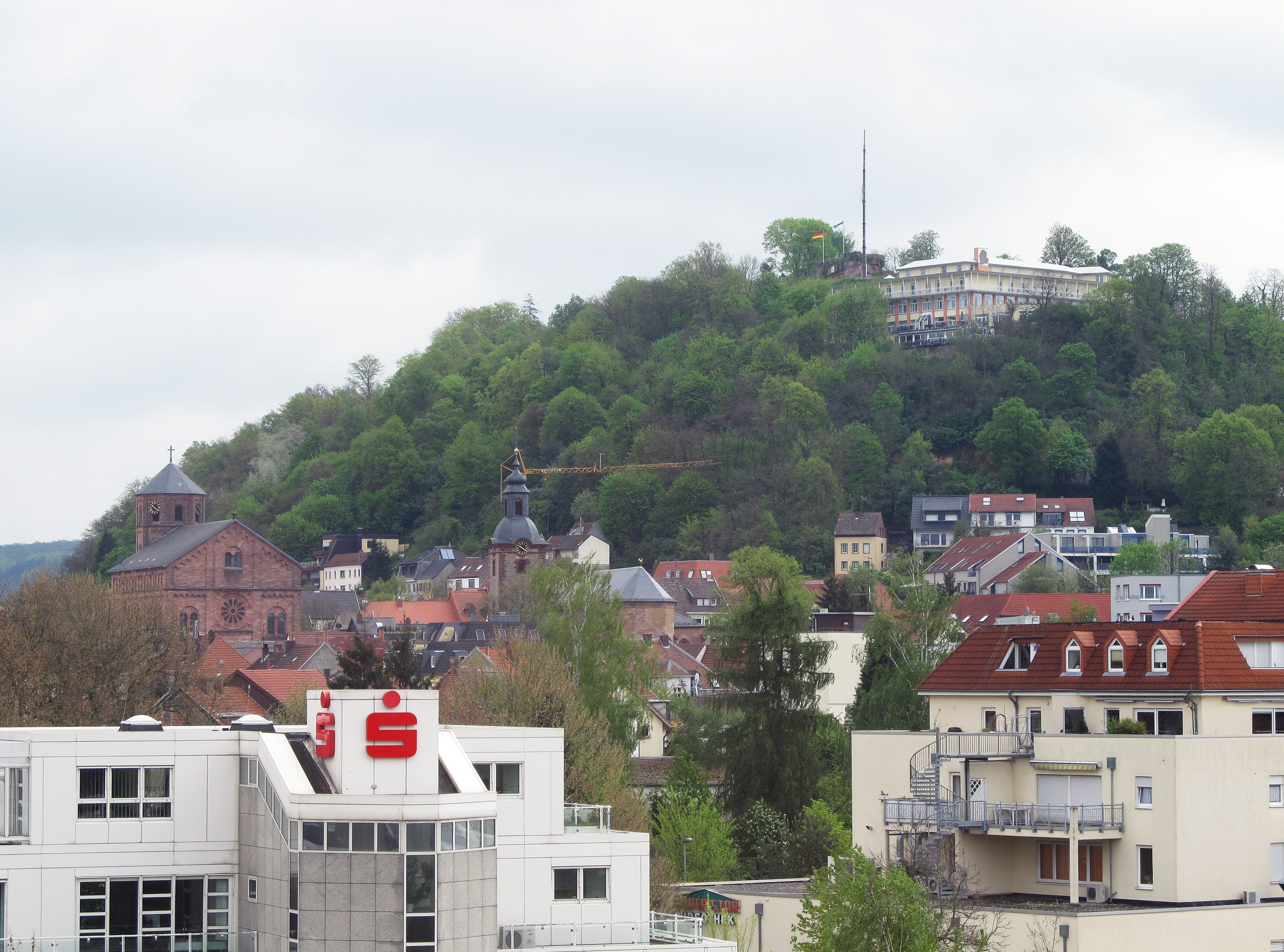
Homburg (Saar)

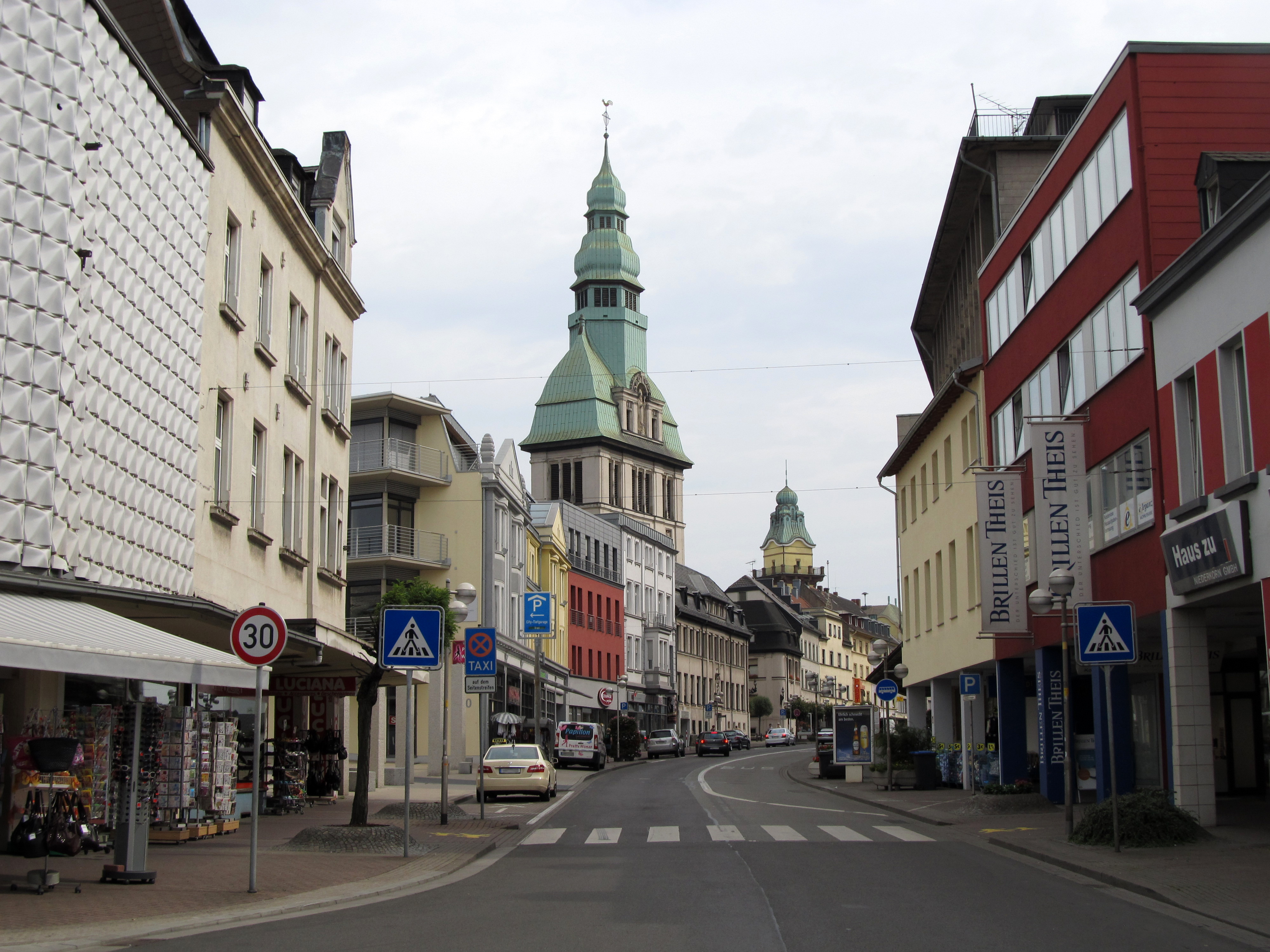
Völklingen

The following table lists the 40 cities and communes in Saarland with a population of at least 10,000 on May 15, 2022, as estimated by the Federal Statistical Office of Germany. A city is displayed in bold if it is a state or federal capital.

1. The city rank by population as of May 15, 2022, as enumerate by the 2022 German Census
2. The city name
3. The name of the district (Landkreis) in which the city lies (some cities are districts on their own called urban districts)
4. The city population as of May 15, 2022, as enumerate by the 2022 German Census
5. The city population as of May 9, 2011, as enumerated by the 2011 European Union census
6. The city land area as of May 15, 2022
7. The city population density as of May 15, 2022 (residents per unit of land area)

2022 rank	City	District	2022 census	2011 census	2022 land area	2022 pop. density
1	**Saarbrücken**	Saarbrücken	179,296	175,853	168 km²	1,070/km²
2	Neunkirchen	Neunkirchen	46,906	46,172	75.3 km²	623.3/km²
3	Homburg (Saar)	Saarpfalz-Kreis	42,891	41,502	82.6 km²	519.2/km²
4	Völklingen	Saarbrücken	40,206	38,809	67.1 km²	599.2/km²
5	Saarlouis	Saarlouis	37,592	34,479	43.3 km²	868.2/km²
6	Sankt Ingbert	Saarpfalz-Kreis	35,603	36,645	50.0 km²	712.8/km²
7	Merzig	Merzig-Wadern	31,618	29,727	109 km²	290.1/km²
8	Sankt Wendel	Sankt Wendel	25,440	26,220	114 km²	224.1/km²
9	Dillingen, Saarland	Saarlouis	21,379	20,253	22.1 km²	969.6/km²
10	Blieskastel	Saarpfalz-Kreis	20,167	21,255	108 km²	186.4/km
11	Lebach	Saarlouis	19,398	19,484	64.2 km²	302.1/km²
12	Heusweiler	Saarbrücken	18,391	18,201	40.0 km²	459.7/km²
13	Püttlingen	Saarbrücken	18,390	19,134	23.9 km²	767.8/km²
14	Schwalbach, Saarland	Saarlouis	18,070	17,320	27.4 km²	660.2/km²
15	Wadgassen	Saarlouis	17,877	17,885	25.9 km²	690.0/km²
16	Bexbach	Saarpfalz-Kreis	17,797	18,038	31.1 km²	572.4/km²
17	Schmelz	Saarlouis	16,875	16,435	58.6 km²	287.9/km²
18	Eppelborn	Neunkirchen	16,614	17,726	47.3 km²	287.9/km²
19	Wadern	Merzig-Wadern	16,585	16,181	111 km²	351.6/km²
20	Losheim am See	Merzig-Wadern	16,574	15,906	97.0 km²	171.0/km²
21	Sulzbach/Saar	Saarbrücken	16,419	16,591	16.1 km²	1,022/km²
22	Illingen	Neunkirchen	15,958	16,978	36.1 km²	442.2/km²
23	Schiffweiler	Neunkirchen	15,900	15,993	21.4 km²	742.3/km²
24	Beckingen	Merzig-Wadern	15,496	15,355	51.9 km²	298.9/km²
25	Rehlingen-Siersburg	Saarlouis	15,023	14,526	61.3 km²	245.3/km²
26	Ottweiler	Neunkirchen	14,425	14,934	45.6 km²	316.6/km²
27	Riegelsberg	Saarbrücken	14,386	14,763	14.7 km²	982.0/km²
28	Saarwellingen	Saarlouis	13,605	13,348	41.7 km²	326.5/km²
29	Quierschied	Saarbrücken	12,998	13,506	20.2 km²	643.1/km²
30	Spiesen-Elversberg	Neunkirchen	12,969	13,509	11.4 km²	1,136/km²
31	Mettlach	Merzig-Wadern	12,545	12,180	77.8 km²	161.2/km²
32	Tholey	Sankt Wendel	12,270	12,385	57.5 km²	213.2/km²
33	Überherrn	Saarlouis	12,059	11,655	34.3 km²	351.5/km²
34	Mandelbachtal	Saarpfalz-Kreis	10,955	11,107	57.7 km²	189.8/km²
35	Kleinblittersdorf	Saarbrücken	10,888	11,396	27.2 km²	400.4/km²
36	Marpingen	Sankt Wendel	10,277	10,590	39.8 km²	258.0/km²
37	Friedrichsthal	Saarbrücken	10,228	10,409	9.0 km²	1,138/km²
38	Kirkel	Saarpfalz-Kreis	10,192	10,058	31.3 km²	325.2/km²
39	Merchweiler	Neunkirchen	10,052	10,219	12.8 km²	785.3/km²
40	Nohfelden	Sankt Wendel	10,023	10,247	100.8 km²	100.8/km²
