= Saarland Police =

State police of the German state Saarland

Polizei Saarland

Agency overview
- Employees: 3,100

Jurisdictional structure
- Operations jurisdiction: Saarland, Germany
- Location of Saarland shown in Germany
- Area: 2,569 square kilometres (992 sq mi)
- Population: 990,000
- General nature: Civilian police

Operational structure
- Overseen by: Saar Ministry of the Interior, Urban Development and Sports (Ministerium für Inneres, Bau und Sport)
- Headquarters: Saarbrücken
- Agency executive: Norbert Rupp, Landespolizeipräsident

Website
- https://www.saarland.de/polizei/

Saarland State Police (German: Landespolizei Saarland) is the state police force of the German state of Saarland. It is subordinated to the Saar Ministry of the Interior, Urban Development and Sports.

== Responsibilities ==
The Police in Saarland are responsible for averting dangers to Public Order and Safety, and to aid and notify Authorities tasked with Public Safety if necessary, as well as to determine and investigate misdemeanors. Part of averting dangers to Public Safety is responding to Emergencies. Furthermore, the Police must investigate Crime according to § 163 StPO.

== Equipment ==
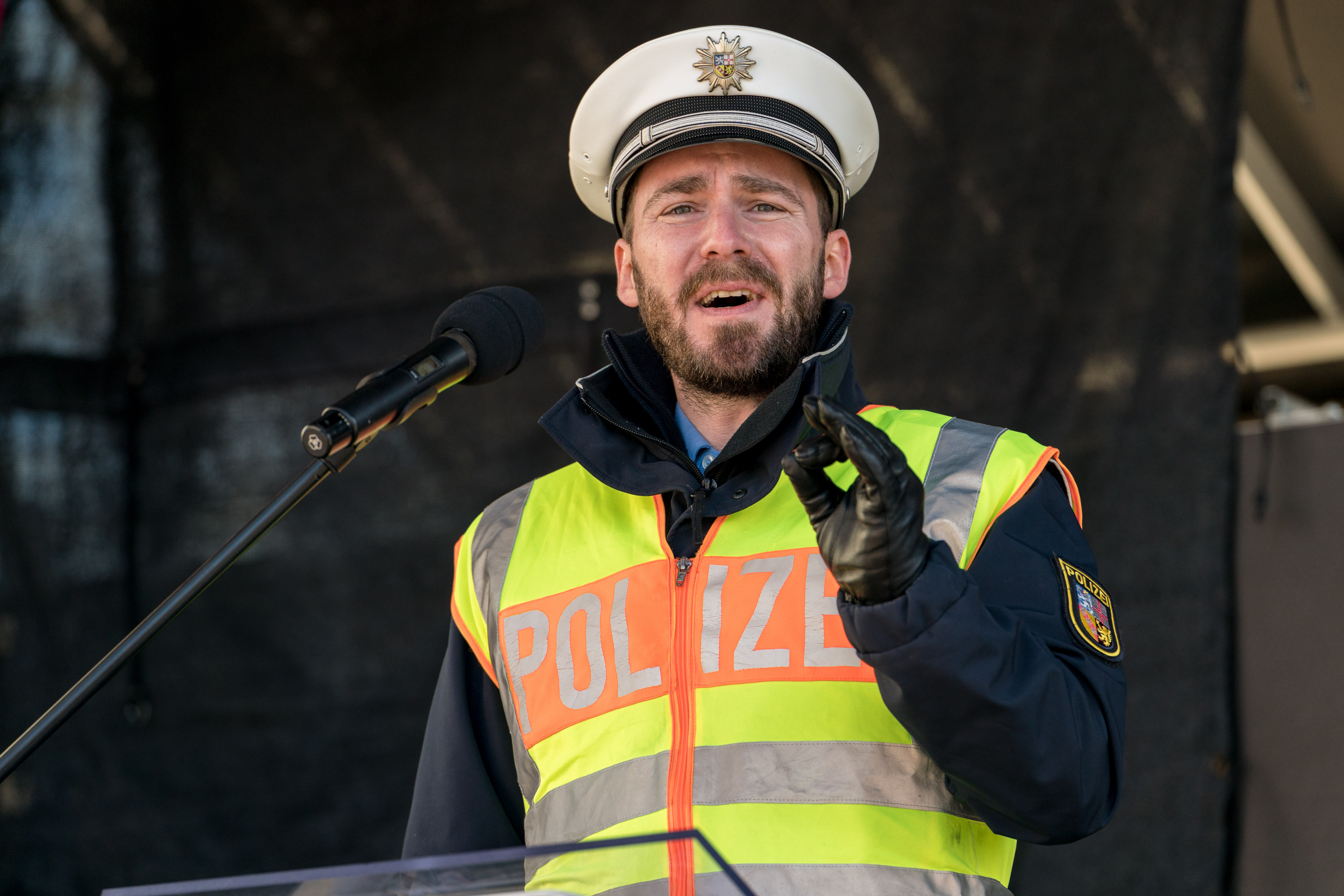
A typical Saar policeman

Saarland uses post-2020 Ford Explorers as patrol vehicles. The Saar Police have been using a blue uniform since 2014, which is shared with Rhineland-Palatinate and Hesse. Saar Police officers have been equipped with Bodycams since 2015 and carry Tasers since 2020.

The Heckler & Koch P9S pistol became the standard sidearm of the Saar Police in the 1970s. They were replaced with Heckler & Koch P10 in 1998, and Heckler & Koch SFP9 in 2024.

== Organisation ==
=== Landespolizeipräsidium ===
As per the Verwaltungsvorschrift über Organisation und Aufgaben des Landespolizeipräsidiums of 2018 (Directive on the Organisation and Responsibilities of the State Police Presidium), the Saar State Police is headed by the Landespolizeipräsidium (State Police Presidium). Its head is the current Landespolizeipräsident Norbert Rupp.

The Landespolizeipräsidium is divided into four Directorates.

Directorate 1

Directorate 1 (German: Direktion LPP 1) is responsible for averting dangers to Public safety and Emergency response. Traffic Police, the Bereitschaftspolizei (Riot Police), and the Wasserschutzpolizei (Waterways Police) are part of the Directorate 1, as well as Specialized Units such as the Saar Spezialeinsatzkommando (SEK), the Mobiles Einsatzkommando (MEK) and the Bomb Squad.

Directorate 2

Directorate 2 (German: Direktion LPP 2) is responsible for repressive Measures against crime, and houses the Saar Landeskriminalamt.

Directorate 3

Directorate 3 (German: Direktion LPP 3) is responsible for Human resources, education and training, and houses the medical and psychological Service.

Directorate 4

Directorate 4 (German: Direktion LPP 4) is responsible for Logistics, Budget and Equipment, and includes the Saar Police Orchestra.

=== Polizeiinspektionen ===
The Saar Police is divided into 12 Police Inspections (German: Polizeiinspektionen).

Polizeiinspektion Saarbrücken-Stadt

The Polizeiinspektion Saarbrücken-Stadt includes one Police Precinct in Alt-Saarbrücken and one in Saarbrücken-Brebach, part of which is a Police Posting in Kleinbittersdorf.

Polizeiinspektion Saarbrücken-Burbach

The Polizeiinspektion Saarbrücken-Burbach includes a Police Posting in Gersweiler-Klarenthal.

Polizeiinspektion Völklingen

The Polizeiinspektion Völklingen includes a Police Precinct in Köllertal, part of which are Police Postings in Heusweiler and Riegelsberg. An additional Police Posting is situated in Großrosseln.

Polizeiinspektion Saarlouis

The Polizeiinspektion Saarlouis includes a Police Precinct in Bous with subordinated Police Postings in Überherrn, Wadgassen, Schwalbach and Ensdorf. Another Police Precinct is located in Dillingen, part of which are Police Postings in Rehlingen-Siersburg and Nalbach. There is a further Police Posting in Wallerfangen.

Polizeiinspektion Lebach

The Polizeiinspektion Lebach consist of two Police Postings, in Saarwellingen and Schmelz.

Polizeiinspektion Nordsaarland

The Polizeiinspektion Nordsaarland includes four Police Postings, in Losheim am See, Weiskirchen, Nohfelden and Nonnweiler.

Polizeiinspektion Merzig

The Polizeiinspektion Merzig is made up of three Police Postings, in Perl, Mettlach and Beckingen.

Polizeiinspektion St. Wendel

The Polizeiinspektion St. Wendel consists of five Police Postings, in Freisen, Marpingen, Namborn, Oberthal and Tholey.

Polizeiinspektion Neunkirchen

The Polizeiinspektion Neunkirchen includes a Police Precinct in Illingen, part of which are Police Postings in Eppelborn, Schiffweiler and Merchweiler. Additional Police Postings are located in Ottweiler and Spiesen-Elversberg.

Polizeiinspektion Sulzbach

There are three Police Postings which make up the Polizeiinspektion Sulzbach. They are located in Dudweiler, Friederichsthal and Quierscheid.

Polizeiinspektion Homburg

The Polizeiinspektion Homburg includes a Police Precinct in Blieskastel, part of which are two Police Postings in Gersheim and Mandelbachtal. Additional Police Postings are located in Bexbach and Kirkel.

Polizeiinspektion St. Ingbert

There are no additional Police Postings within the Polizeiinspektion St. Ingbert.

== Ranks ==
The ranking-system of the Saar State Police is divided into two levels: Gehobener Dienst, and the command level, Höherer Dienst. Uniformed officers, such as those of the Schutzpolizei visibly wear their rank. Officers of the Criminal Investigation Police do not wear Uniforms, thus there are no Insignias designed for them. Within the ranking system, their titles differ from those of the Schutzpolizei, as the prefix Polizei- is changed to Kriminal-. For example: The equivalent to a Polizeioberkommissar would be a Kriminaloberkommissar.

Laufbahngruppe 2.1 (gehobener Dienst)

| Rank | Insignia |
|---|---|
| Polizeikommissaranwärter | Insignia of a Polizeikommissaranwärter |
| Polizeikommissar | Insignia of a Polizeikommissar |
| Polizeioberkommissar | Insignia of a Polizeioberkommissar |
| Polizeihauptkommissar | Insignias of a Polizehauptkommissar Insignias of a Polizehauptkommissar |
| Erster Polizeihauptkommissar | Insignias of a Erster Polizehauptkommissar |

Laufbahngruppe 2.2 (höherer Dienst)

| Rank | Insignia |
|---|---|
| Polizeirat | Insignias of a Polizeirat |
| Polizeioberrat | Insignias of a Polizeioberrat |
| Polizeidirektor | Insignias of a Polizeidirektor |
| Leitender Polizeidirektor | Insignias of a Leitender Polizeidirektor |
| Landespolizeipräsident | Insignia of the Landespolizeidirektor |

== Training ==
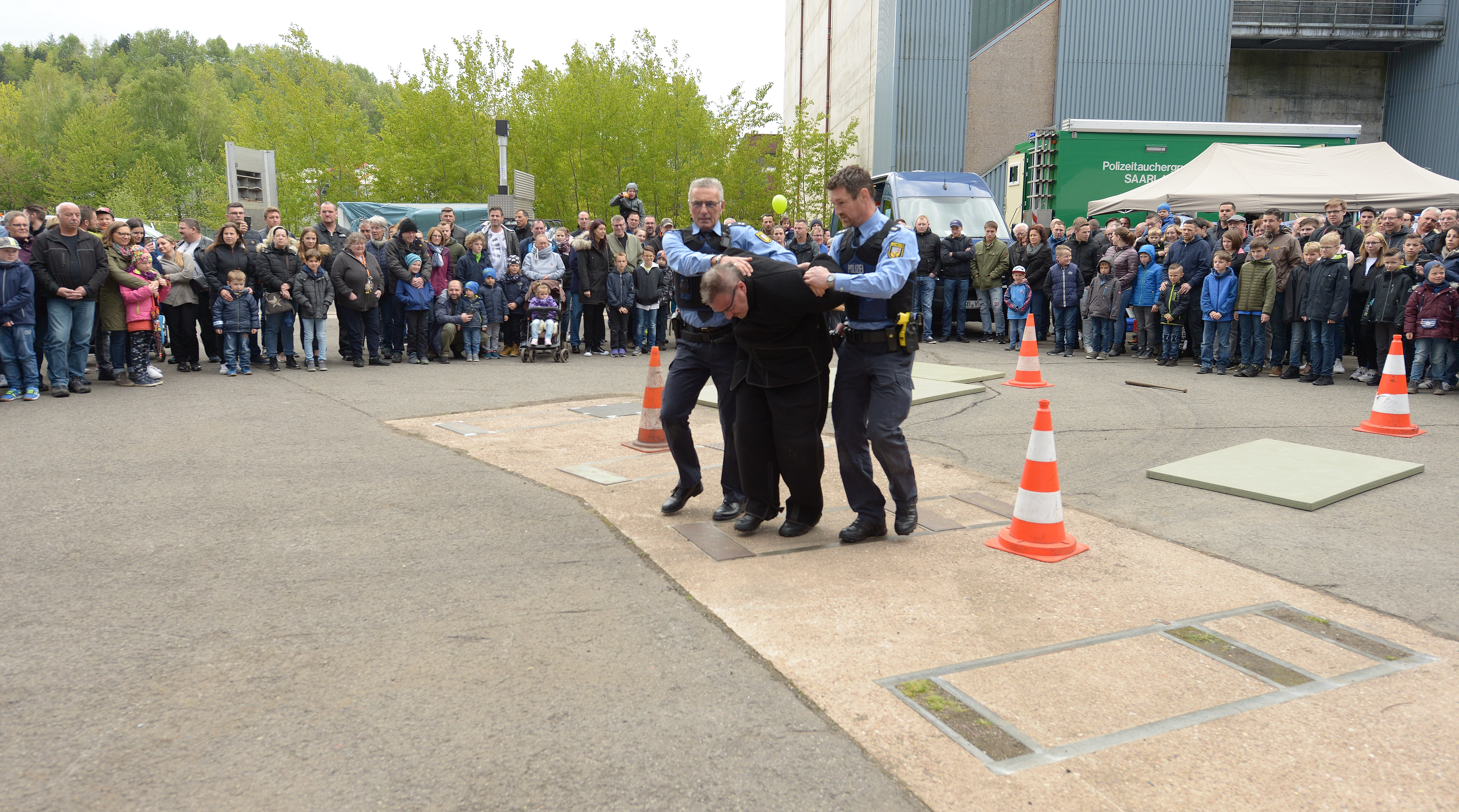
Saar Police officers making a mock arrest at a Police show

Aspiring Police Officers of the Saar State Police bear the title of Polizeikommissaranwärter, or Kriminalkommissaranwärter during three years of training. Part of the training is made up by studying at the Fachhochschule für Verwaltung des Saarlandes (University of Applied Sciences for Public Administration of the Saarland) in Göttelborn, where Polizeikommissaranwärter receive theoretical training through university education. Practical training is provided by a specified time of training-on-the-job at Departments within Saarland. During training, Polizeikommissaranwärter have to obtain a Diploma. After three years of training, the Aspiring Police officers are promoted to the rank of Kriminal- or Polizeikommissar.

== History ==
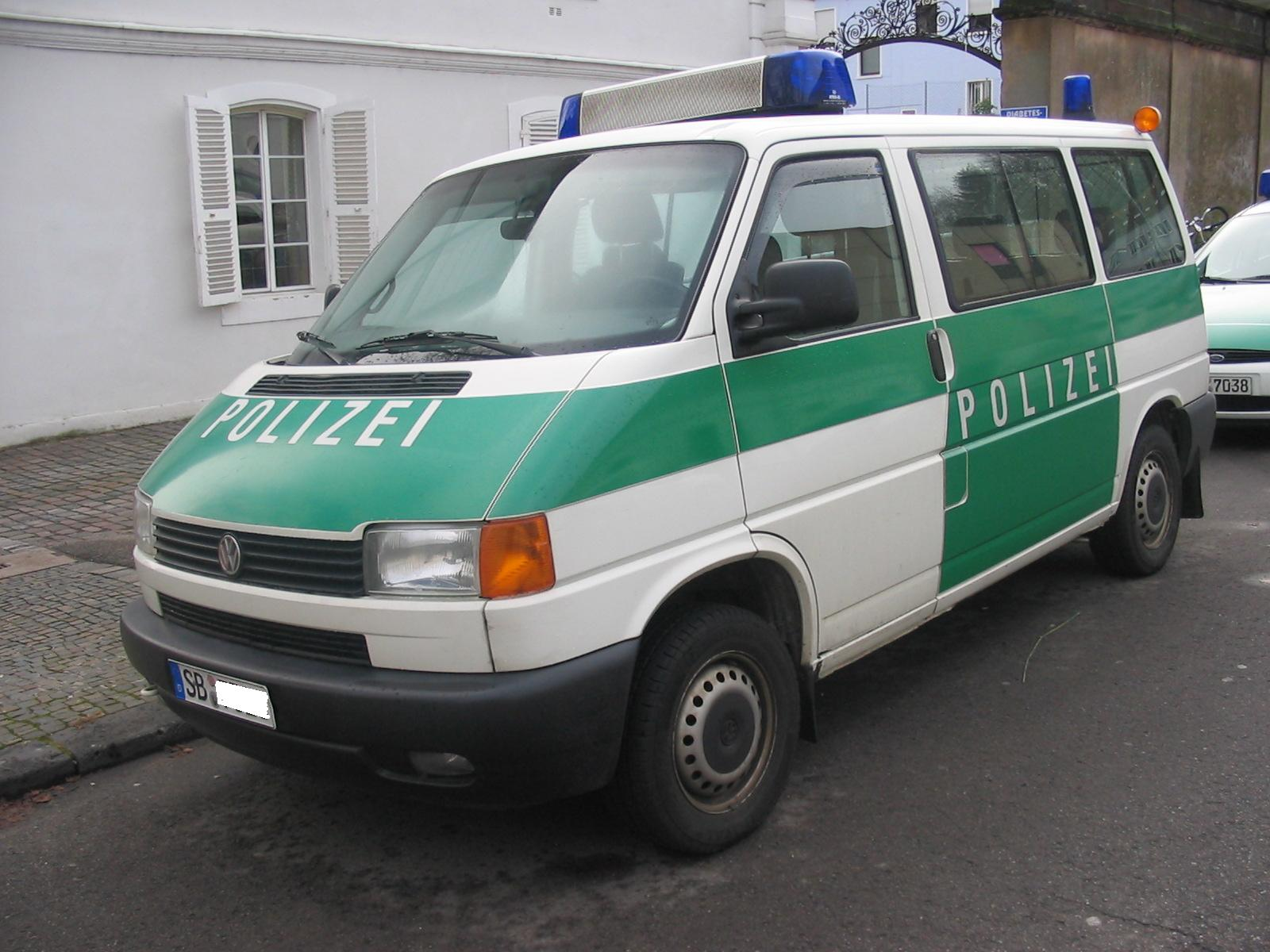
Saar Police van in outdated green livery

In 2014, the Saar Police introduced a blue Police Uniform, which is used in Rhineland-Palatinate and Hesse as well. Car liveries were subsequently changed to blue as well.
