= Alois Huber =

Alois Huber may refer to:

- Alois Huber, perpetrator of the 2013 Annaberg shooting
- Alois Huber (politician) (born 1962), Swiss politician
