= 2022 Kusel shooting =

2022 shooting of police officers in Germany

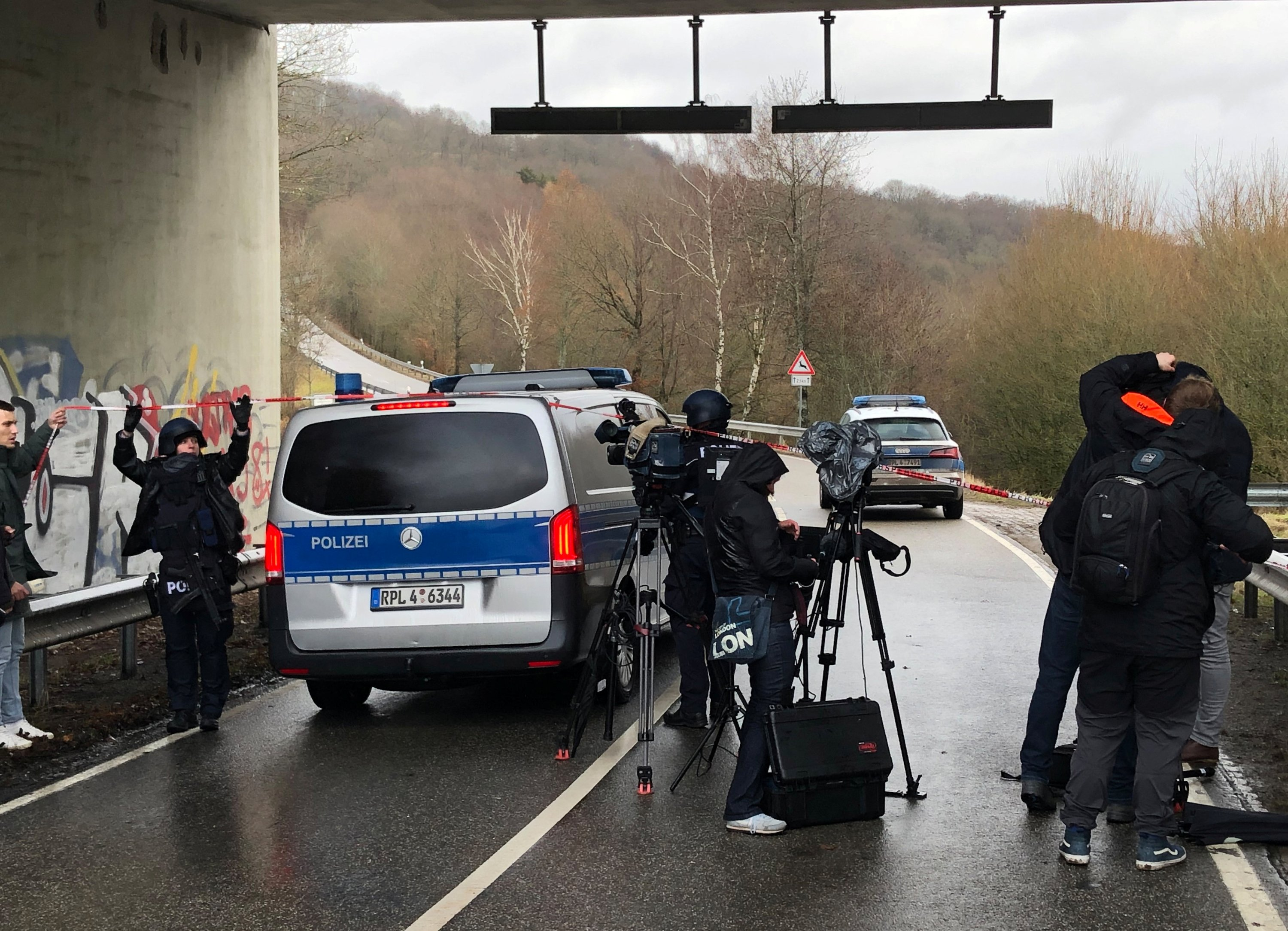
- Investigators at the scene shortly after the shooting
- Location: 49°34′43″N 07°25′43″E; Kreisstraße 22, between Mayweilerhof and Ulmet, Rhineland-Palatinate, Germany
- Date: 31 January 2022; 4:20 a.m. (UTC+1)
- Target: Police officers
- Attack type: Homicide, shootout
- Weapons: Double-barreled shotgun Bergara Takedown .308 single-shot rifle
- Deaths: 2
- Victims: Yasmin Bux, aged 24; Alexander Klos, aged 29
- Perpetrator: Andreas Schmitt
- Convictions: Murder; Poaching

On 31 January 2022, two police officers were fatally shot during a traffic stop on a district road (Kreisstraße) in Kusel district, Rhineland-Palatinate, Germany. Police arrested the two men whose vehicle had been stopped, with the public prosecutor's office believing that the suspects were attempting to cover up their poaching.

== Incident ==
Three police units of the Kusel police inspection had been on routine patrol for the night of 30–31 January 2022 due to an ongoing series of burglaries. The officers were equipped with bulletproof vests in a civil vehicle. While driving on Kreisstraße 22, in a rural area near the border to Saarland, a patrol of two uniformed police officers called in "two dubious persons" inside a panel van parked on the road and would carry out a closer check. At 4:19 a.m., while one officer was talking with the occupants at the front, the other officer spoke into his radio that the back of the van had "the whole trunk filled with dead wildlife".

Approximately 45 seconds following the first transmission, the first officer was shot in the head from close range with a shotgun. The investigation showed that she was probably guileless and may have held a flashlight and the suspects' papers in her hand. Shortly afterwards, a second incomplete radio message followed from the second officer, "Come quickly! They're shooting! Come in! We're between Ulmet and...", which was interrupted by more gunfire. Reinforcements alerted by the radio messages arrived at 4:32 a.m., but discovered both officers dead upon arrival. According to Gewerkschaft der Polizei (GdP), the German trade union of police, the bulletproof vests SK2 used do not protect against large calibre projectiles from a short distance.

It was first assumed that the 24-year-old female officer was killed instantly by a single gunshot whille the 29-year-old officer had been mortally wounded during a brief shootout. A reconstruction of the shooting by the main suspect showed that both officers had been first critically injured before being fatally shot at point-blank range. The female officer had been knocked unconscious by the shotgun blast from the driver. The driver engaged the remaining officer in a shootout while the passenger hid inside a nearby ditch. During the fire exchange, the officer fired fifteen shots, emptying his magazine, but only hitting the van in the darkness. The driver shot the officer twice with his shotgun and a hunting rifle, and once on the ground, the driver fired two fatal shots in the officer's head, the final one from a short distance. The driver and the passenger then attempted to locate the driver's personal documents, realising during the search that the policewoman was still alive. The driver subsequently killed her with a second shot to the head before driving from the scene with the passenger.

== Victims ==
The killed officers were 29-year-old Alexander Klos and 24-year-old Yasmin Maria Bux. Bux was studying policing at the time the shooting happened.

== Manhunt ==
Rhineland-Platinate Police and Saarland Police carried out a massive manhunt. Police were looking for a suspect already known to the police. As the German press Agency reported, the man had been noticed in the past because of an accident hit-and-run and had a firearm license. "We assume several armed perpetrators," said a police spokeswoman. Later in the investigation, the police found the driver's licence and the ID-card of Andreas Schmitt at the crime scene.

At 4 p.m. the same day, the West-Palatinate police issued a press release, stating that initial investigations led to a suspicion of a crime against 38-year-old Andreas Johannes Schmitt from Spiesen-Elversberg. The police were actively searching for the man. Public prosecutors and police asked the public for help.

In the early evening, the police arrested both the wanted Andreas Schmitt and a 32-year-old suspected accomplice in Sulzbach/Saar. Neither offered any resistance. According to the police, firearms were seized during searches of two objects in Sulzbacher Bahnhofstrasse. A suspect's car was also found on that street with bullet holes.

== Investigations ==
The investigating judge assumes that the two suspects were on their way to poach in the district of Kusel. Public prosecutor's office believe that both suspects fired shots. During the investigation, a shotgun and a hunting rifle were seized.

=== Suspects ===
The two arrested suspects are friends of each other.

==== Andreas Schmitt ====
The shooter, 38-year-old Andreas Schmitt, was known to the police for poaching and traffic hit-and-run. He was reported to have no legally binding criminal record, but he also had a record for assault, which was punished with a fine, for shooting and injuring a fellow hunter in 2004. Additionally, he was under investigation for illegally killing a deer on someone else's hunting grounds at the time of his arrest. Schmitt invoked his right to remain silent.

Schmitt had been unemployed since 2020, when he filed for bankruptcy for his bakery after an arson destroyed several transport vehicles. Since 2021, he received unemployment benefits, which he supplemented through wildlife trade, which included unlawful poaching. At the time of the shooting, he had a debt of €2,400,000. An investigation estimates that Schmitt killed hundreds of animals on private property, having earned €40,000 between September 2021 and January 2022. Some landowners and witnesses later testified that Schmitt issued death threats against them when he was questioned about his presence. A psychiatrist stated in court that Schmitt had "certain traits sometimes found in psychopaths" such as cold indifference and overconfidence in his abilities.

Schmitt had originally been in possession of a gun licence since 1999, but it had been revoked once in 2005 for the assault incident before he was granted another in 2012. A renewal was denied in 2020 in relation to irregularities in his bankruptcy filing. He subsequently gave his weapons and equipment, consisting of at least eleven long rifles, five handguns, one crossbow, three silencer attachments, and ammunition with name engravings, into the possession of his wife, who also had a gun licence. Schmitt's wife had since illegally given her husband continued access to the weapons for hunting purposes, but no charges were brought against her.

In November 2022, Schmitt was convicted of double murder and was sentenced to life imprisonment.

==== Florian V. ====
The 32-year-old Florian V. was known to the police for fraud offences. He had no criminal record at the time of his arrest, but had been issued fines for traffic violations, fraud and forgery of documents, and admitted to having substance addiction to marijuana and amphetamines. He was unemployed and aided Schmitt in his poaching since mid-2021, getting paid to locate and carry any poached animals to Schmitt's car in exchange for €10 to €20 per animal.

Among other things, the alleged accomplice was targeted by the investigators because, according to media information, he called Schmitt's wife after the shooting. He later admitted to the poaching, according to the prosecutor's office. He had also described the police control. However, he denies having shot at the officers himself. While murder-related charges were dropped by the public prosecutor, he was ultimately charged with commercial poaching at night and obstruction of justice.

The suspect later made a comprehensive statement and heavily incriminated Andreas Schmidt. He said when the police officers asked for his hunting license, he said he had to get it out of the car. Instead, Schmitt got the shotgun out of the car and shot the female officer and then shot at the male officer. Schmitt instructed him to find his ID or he would kill him too, he said.

== Reactions ==
Deaths of police officers in the line of duty are rare in Germany, the last case having been two years earlier when SEK officer Simon Gudorf was killed during a drug raid in Gelsenkirchen, by a gunman associated with the Reichsbürger movement. Attempted murders and assaults had been on the rise since 2020, although largely limited to cities, specifically in relation to football hooliganism.

The killings were celebrated by certain anti-government groups, such as the Querdenker, as well as leftist university student groups. 412 criminal cases were processed related to online hate speech, mostly for the rewarding and appreciation of criminal acts, as well as denigration of the memory of the deceased per Strafgesetzbuch. LKA also enforced raids which seized the electronic devices of 75 individuals who had called for copycat crimes with explicit reference to the Kusel shooting. In July 2022, a 35-year-old man from Munich was sentenced to 14 months imprisonment for wishing death upon more police during an arrest. In September 2022, a 56-year-old man from Idar-Oberstein man was sentenced to 18 months imprisonment for calling for a "cop hunt" and offering to lure officers onto remote paths in two videos posted to Facebook; both men had extensive criminal records beforehand. The defence of the latter blamed poor mental health and framed their client's comments as "comedy". Laws regarding online hate speech were tightened due to social media responses, some of which had directly targeted the families of the deceased, including confrontations at memorial services.

Federal Interior Minister Nancy Faeser (SPD) said: "Regardless of the motive behind the crime, this act is reminiscent of an execution, and it shows that police officers risk their lives every day for our safety."

== See also ==
- 2013 Annaberg shooting
