= Sulzbach (Saar) station =

Railway station in Germany

Sulzbach (Saar)
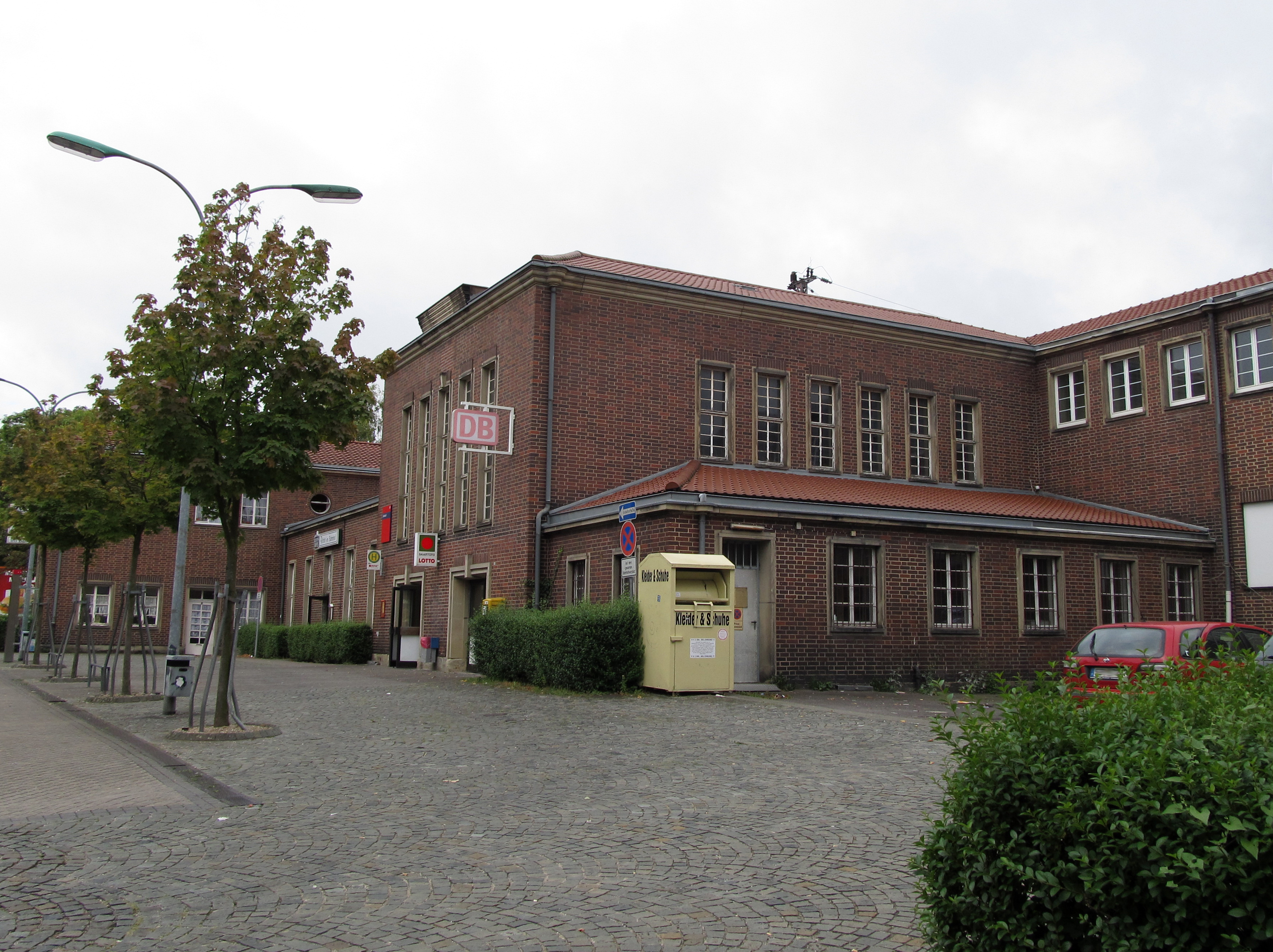
- Entrance building

General information
- Location: Taubenflugstr. 1, Sulzbach, Saarland; Germany
- Coordinates: 49°17′58″N 7°03′19″E
- Line: Nahe Valley Railway (km 133.1)
- Platforms: 2

Construction
- Accessible: Yes

Other information
- Station code: 6112
- DS100 code: SSZ
- IBNR: 8005796
- Category: 5
- Fare zone: SaarVV: 181
- Website: www.bahnhof.de

History
- Opened: 16 November 1852

Services
Preceding station	Vlexx	Following station
Dudweiler towards Saarbrücken Hbf	RB 73	Sulzbach (Saar) Altenwald towards Neubrücke (Nahe)
Location

Sulzbach (Saar) station is, along with (Saar)-Altenwald station, one of two stations in the town of Sulzbach in the German state of Saarland. Deutsche Bahn classifies it as belonging to category 5 and it has two platform tracks. The station is located in the network of the Saarländischer Verkehrsverbund (Saarland transport association, saarVV).

== Location ==
The station is located in the centre of the town of Sulzbach in the street of Am Bahnhof. A connecting line formerly branched off to the Grube Altenwald colliery.

== History ==
Sulzbach (Saar) station was opened with the commissioning of the Neunkirchen–Saarbrücken section in 1852 as a continuation of the Palatine Ludwig Railway (Pfälzische Ludwigsbahn) between Ludwigshafen and Bexbach, which had been completed in 1849 and extended to Neunkirchen in 1850. The railway was intended to be used to transport coal from the Saar area to the Rhine region. Originally the Bavarians considered St. Ingbert, which was in Bavaria, as the western end of the line, but this changed under pressure from Prussia, which had a commitment in the long-term to build a line to Saarbrücken that ran only through its own territory. For this reason, the line was built to Bexbach, from where it was later extended via Neunkirchen and the Sulzbach valley.

== Entrance building ==
The entrance building of Sulzbach station was built out of clinker with two and one storey sections between 1938 and 1940. It replaced an earlier timber building. An interlocking that controls signalling in Sulzbach and Friedrichsthal stations is located next to the track at the level of the platform, but this is remotely-controlled from Neunkirchen in regular operation. The entrance building is a protected monument.

== Platform and tracks ==
The Sulzbach (Saar) station area includes several tracks. Passenger services are operated over the first two tracks (next to the station building) and stop at a covered island platform. Access via a pedestrian tunnel was originally not barrier-free. Work to renovate and make it barrier-free began on 20 March 2017. The station was supposed to be barrier-free from July 2020, but there were major problems with the commissioning of the lift. The lift has been in operation since the end of November 2021. Five additional tracks are used for freight traffic. There used to be a goods shed and a loading ramp with a head ramp on the side opposite the station building. These are no longer in use, but still exist.

== Operations ==
Sulzbach station is served only by Regionalbahn services on line RB 73, running every 30 minutes from Saarbrücken to St. Wendel (every 60 minutes to Neubrücke (Nahe)). The RE 3 trains to Mainz, operated since the takeover by vlexx, have not stopped in Sulzbach since the timetable change of December 2015.

Line	Route	Interval
RB 73	(Neubrücke (Nahe) – Türkismühle –) St. Wendel – Neunkirchen (Saar) Hbf – Sulzbach (Saar) – Saarbrücken Hbf	30 mins

The following bus lines stop at the station forecourt: 103 (to Altenwald and Saarbrücken-Klarenthal), 132 (to Dudweiler via Quierschied–Fischbach) and 160 (to Dudweiler via Neuweiler).
