= Peter Szurman =

German ophthalmologist

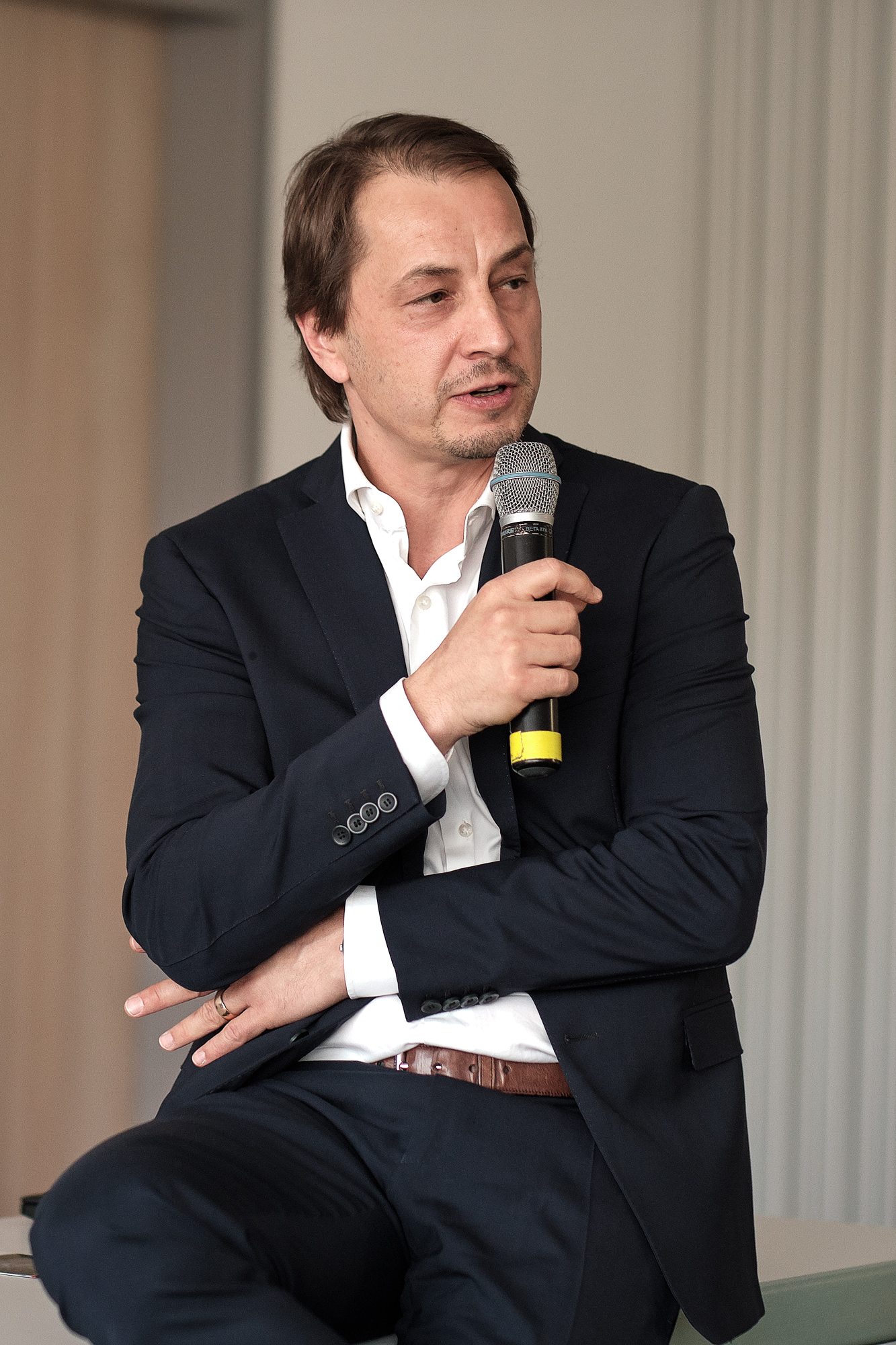
Peter Szurman in 2019.

Peter Szurman is a German ophthalmologist, scientist, and professor of ophthalmology in Sulzbach/Saar.

== Career ==
After graduating from the humanistic high school in Velbert-Langenberg in 1987, he began studying human medicine in Essen and Paris. He received his doctorate at the Institute of Biochemistry of the University of Essen on the isolation of basal lamina membrane protein of the eye lens. This was followed by further training as a specialist in ophthalmology at the University Eye Hospital of Cologne under the direction of Klaus Heimann. As part of a research consortium funded by the German Federal Ministry of Education and Research, he dedicated himself to the development of the first electronic retinal prosthesis for artificial vision. In 2001, he moved to the University Eye Hospital in Tübingen as a senior physician. His scientific focus there was on biotechnological research of new drugs and tamponades for retinal diseases as well as electronic visual prostheses for corneal blind people.

In 2007 he habilitated on new treatment options for macular degeneration. This was followed in 2008 by his nomination as directing physician and directing senior physician and representative director of the University Eye Hospital in Tübingen. The awarding of a professorship in ophthalmology by the faculty of Tübingen took place in 2009. In the following year, 2010, he was appointed section director for "Experimental Occular Surgery" at the University Eye Hospital Tübingen. Then, one year later he became director of the Eye Hospital Sulzbach at the Knappschaftsklinikum Saar after appointment list positions at the Charité Universitätsmedizin Berlin and the University Hospital Münster.

== Areas of expertise and treatment focus ==
Szurman's area of expertise is minimally invasive eye surgery, including retinal vitrectomy, treatment of macular degeneration, corneal transplantation with laser and partial grafts (DMEK), stem cell therapy for corneal surface healing disorders after corrosive injuries and burns, trauma reconstruction, glaucoma surgery with microcatheters (canaloplasty), and laser surgery for cataracts.

== Scientific achievement ==
Szurman maintains several research groups, development partnerships with medical technology companies, a research collaboration with the Fraunhofer Institute Sulzbach (IBMT), a dust-free room tissue bank, and an international study center. Szurman's research focuses on the development of new surgical techniques using biotechnological as well as biomedical engineering tissue substitutes for difficult-to-treat eye diseases, especially retinal surgery, stem cell therapy, and transplantation surgery. Szurman has also researched in the topic of electronic visual prostheses. In 1997, his research group demonstrated the feasibility of electronic epiretinal stimulation of retinal cells by implanted electrodes in the eye resulting in visual perception in the visual cortex. Szurman developed a new surgical method with which a complex electronic retinal implant overall system can be implanted and fixed under the retina. With this patented technique, he performed the world's first implantation of a functional neuronal subretinal visual prosthesis in humans in a long-term trial in 2006 as a member of an interdisciplinary team of surgeons. Other research projects in ocular biomedical microsystems engineering include the development of a wide-angle retinal implant and a subchoroid implantable microsensor (patent pending) for non-contact telemetric eye pressure measurement in glaucoma patients. Other published developments include new surgical techniques for the treatment of retinal detachment, macular degeneration, glaucoma, lens surgery, new laser techniques, and stem cell therapy in the eye. Another scientific focus is the translational research on the new partial corneal transplantation (DMEK, Descemetmembranous Endothelial Keratoplasty). In 2012, he developed and patented the world's first transplantation system for modern partial grafts*. Further developments include new laboratory methods to produce corneal lamellae and the patented production of a preloaded DMEK lamella. Szurman founded a specialized dust-free room tissue bank at the Sulzbach Eye Hospital in 2015 in cooperation with the German Society for Tissue Transplantation (DGFG).

== Publications ==
Szurman has published over 200 original scientific PubMed-listed papers in international referenced journals as well as 30 book contributions, which have been cited approximately 5,000 times.

== Awards and patents ==
In 2007, Szurman received the German Ophthalmic Surgeons (DOC) Grand Research Award for his work on the treatment of macular degeneration. Other awards include the Pharmacia Research Fellow Award, the Novartis Innovative Development Grant, and several lecture, poster, and video awards. He has been an honorary member of the Bulgarian Ophthalmological Society since 2015. Szurman has received six teaching awards, including the 2006 "tuevalon" major teaching award from the Faculty of Medicine in Tübingen.

Szurman holds six international patents on surgical techniques and biomedical engineering developments in ophthalmic surgery. These include international patent grants on the first implantation system for corneal partial grafts, a transplant cartridge for pre-prepared grafts, a suprachoroidal pressure sensor for glaucoma patients, and on the technique of subretinal implantation of an electronic visual prosthesis (Retina Implant).
