= HYDAC (company) =

German company group

- Type: GmbHs
- Industry: Hydraulics
- Founded: 1963
- Headquarters: Sulzbach/Saar, Germany
- Revenue: €2.5 billion
- Number of employees: > 10,000
- Website: www.hydac.com

HYDAC is a German company group that specializes in the production and distribution of components and systems as well as services related to hydraulics and fluidics. Hydac is constituted of 15 legal entities, all of which are GmbHs, companies with limited liability. CEOs for these companies are Alexander Dieter, Wolfgang Haering and Hartmut Herzog. Subsidiaries exist in more than 10 countries. In 2011, the company had approximately 5,500 employees.

== History ==
HYDAC was founded in 1963 by Werner Dieter and Ottmar Schön, when an exclusive license for central Europe for a hydraulic accumulator was taken out. The name HYDAC is an abbreviation for "hydraulic accumulator".

== Company structuring ==
In 2015, HYDAC had 9,000 employees, 50 subsidiaries, and 500 distribution and service partners. The company group is headquartered in Sulzbach (Saarland). More than 3000 employees are employed in Sulzbach.

In 2014, the subsidiary with the highest revenue was HYDAC Technology GmbH with revenues of €445.6 million and 384 employees. In the same year, HYDAC International GmbH and its 466 employees, which is presently providing distribution services to the other subsidiaries of the group, had revenues of €75.9 million.

The groups subsidiaries are:

- HYDAC Technology GmbH in Sulzbach / Saar
- HYDAC Filtertechnik GmbH in Sulzbach / Saar
- HYDAC Fluidtechnik GmbH in Sulzbach / Saar
- HYDAC International GmbH in Sulzbach / Saar
- HYDAC Verwaltung GmbH in Sulzbach / Saar
- HYDAC Electronic GmbH in Gersweiler / Saar
- HYDAC Accessories GmbH in Sulzbach / Saar
- HYDAC Process Technology GmbH in Neunkirchen / Saar
- HYDAC System GmbH in Sulzbach / Saar
- HYDAC Service GmbH in Sulzbach / Saar
- HYDAC PTK Produktionstechnik GmbH in Sulzbach / Saar
- HYDAC Cooling GmbH in Sulzbach / Saar
- HYDAC Filter Systems GmbH in Sulzbach / Saar
- HYDAC Grundstücksverwaltung GmbH in Sulzbach / Saar
- HYDAC FluidCareCenter GmbH in Sulzbach / Saar
- HYDAC Drive Center GmbH in Langenau
- HYDAC Speichertechnik GmbH in Sulzbach / Saar
- HYDROSAAR GmbH in Sulzbach / Saar
- Kraeft GmbH Systemtechnik in Bremerhaven
- NORDHYDRAULIC in Kramfors, Sweden
- QHP in Chester, England
- Hydac Engineering AG in Steinhausen, Switzerland
- BIERI in Liebefeld, Switzerland
- HYCOM in Apeldoorn, Netherlands
