= Neunkirchen District =

Neunkirchen District may refer to:

- Neunkirchen District, Austria, "Bezirk Neunkirchen" a district in Lower Austria
- Neunkirchen (German district), "Kreis Neunkirchen" a rural district (Landkreis) in Saarland, Germany
