= Luise Herrmann-Ries =

Saarland politician (1904–1971)

Lilli Herrmann-Ries
- Born: Luise Karoline Ries; 13 February 1904; Altenkessel, Saarland, Germany
- Died: 17 January 1971; Neunkirchen, Saarland, West Germany
- Occupations: political and feminist activist politician
- Spouse: Willi Herrmann
- Children: Helga (1924-)
- Parent(s): Wilhelm Jakob Ries; Margaretha Luise Forst

Luise "Lilli" Herrmann-Ries (13 February 1904 – 17 January 1971) was a politician (KPD) and women's rights activist in the Saarland.

== Life ==
Luise Karoline Ries was born in the Altenkessel quarter of Saarbrücken. Her father, Wilhelm Jakob Ries, worked as a machine maintenance engineer. Her mother, born Margaretha Luise Forst, died during her birth, and her father died shortly afterwards. She was accordingly bought up by her maternal uncle, Friedrich Forst, in Wiebelkirchen, a small town in the hilly countryside between Saarbrücken and Mainz. After leaving middle school Luise Ries undertook domestic service and office work in a wholesale business.

She married Willi Herrmann, a labour activist and, after 1930, a Communist Party member, in 1923. (some sources give the marriage year as 1932, but they appear to be in the minority.) This brought her into contact with the Communist Party which she herself joined in 1931. By that time she had already been politically active in other areas, notably, since 1929, through her membership of the "League of Working Women" ("Bund werktätiger Frauen"). She became a member of the Young Friends of Nature ("Naturfreundejugend Deutschlands") in 1927.

In 1932 Lilli Herrmann-Ries was elected to the Saarland parliament ("Landesrat"), becoming (after Elisabeth Hallauer) only the second - and as matters turned out the last - woman elected to the legislature. During the buildup to the 1935 referendum on the political status of the Saarland she campaigned against reunification of the Saarland with the rest of Germany, which had been transformed into a post-democratic single-party dictatorship since the Nazi takeover two years earlier. The referendum result nevertheless overwhelmingly favoured a return, for the region, to its pre-war incorporation into the rest of Germany: the Communist Party was illegal in Hitler's Germany, and later in January 1935 she fled to Paris.

A few months later she had made her way to Moscow where she was able to be reunited with her husband who had also managed to escape from Germany. Between August 1935 and July 1937 she attended the Comintern's International Lenin School in Moscow, where she was identified by the cover name "Hilde Engelmann". The two of them then made their way back to France. For many people it took some months for the declaration of war by France and England to have much obvious impact, but thousands of German refugees from Nazi Germany, including Lilli Herrmann-Ries, were identified as enemy aliens and arrested. She was held at the concentration camp in Gurs (with a short interval when she was held at Rivesalt) for sixteenth months. In June 1941 she was returned to Germany with her daughter and set to work at the steel works in Neunkirchen. However, on 21 September 1941 she was arrested by the Gestapo. At a trial on 28 May 1942 she was sentenced to spend four and a half years in prison. She was held in prison at Aichach in Upper Bavaria between 1942 and 1945. At the end of the war, in May 1945, she was released by US troops. Her husband, by this time, had died under circumstances that were never clear, in February 1944, at Butzbach.

Luise Herrmann-Ries died at Neunkirchen in the Saarland on 17 January 1971. There had been no return to politics or activism for her after 1945.
