= Konrad Grebe =

German mining engineer and inventor (1907–1972)

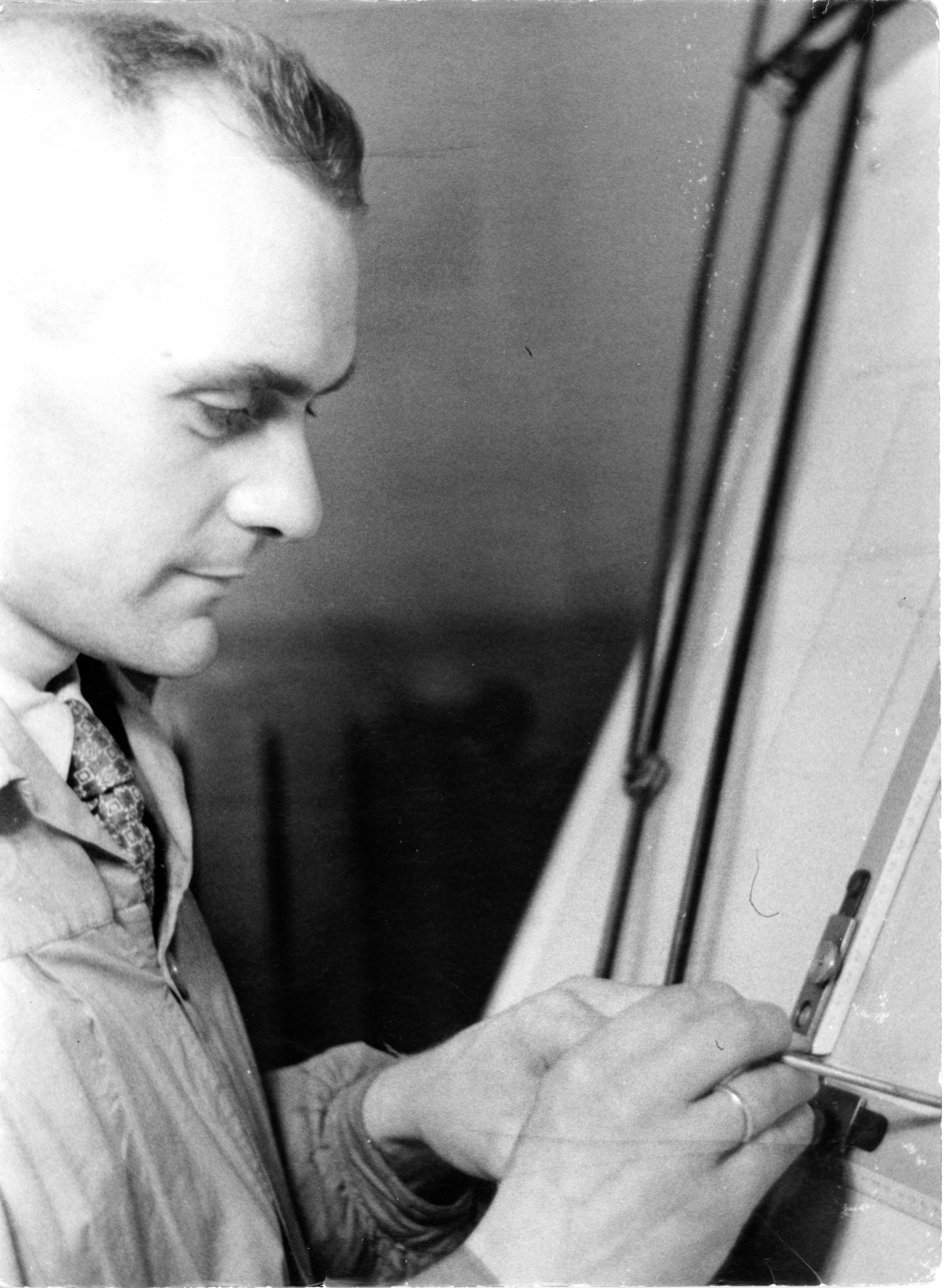
- Born: June 7, 1907; Schiffweiler, Saarland, Germany
- Died: 12 July 1972 (aged 65); Wuppertal, North Rhine-Westphalia, Germany
- Occupations: Engineer, inventor

Konrad Grebe (7 June 1907 – 12 July 1972) was a German mining engineer and inventor.

== Life ==
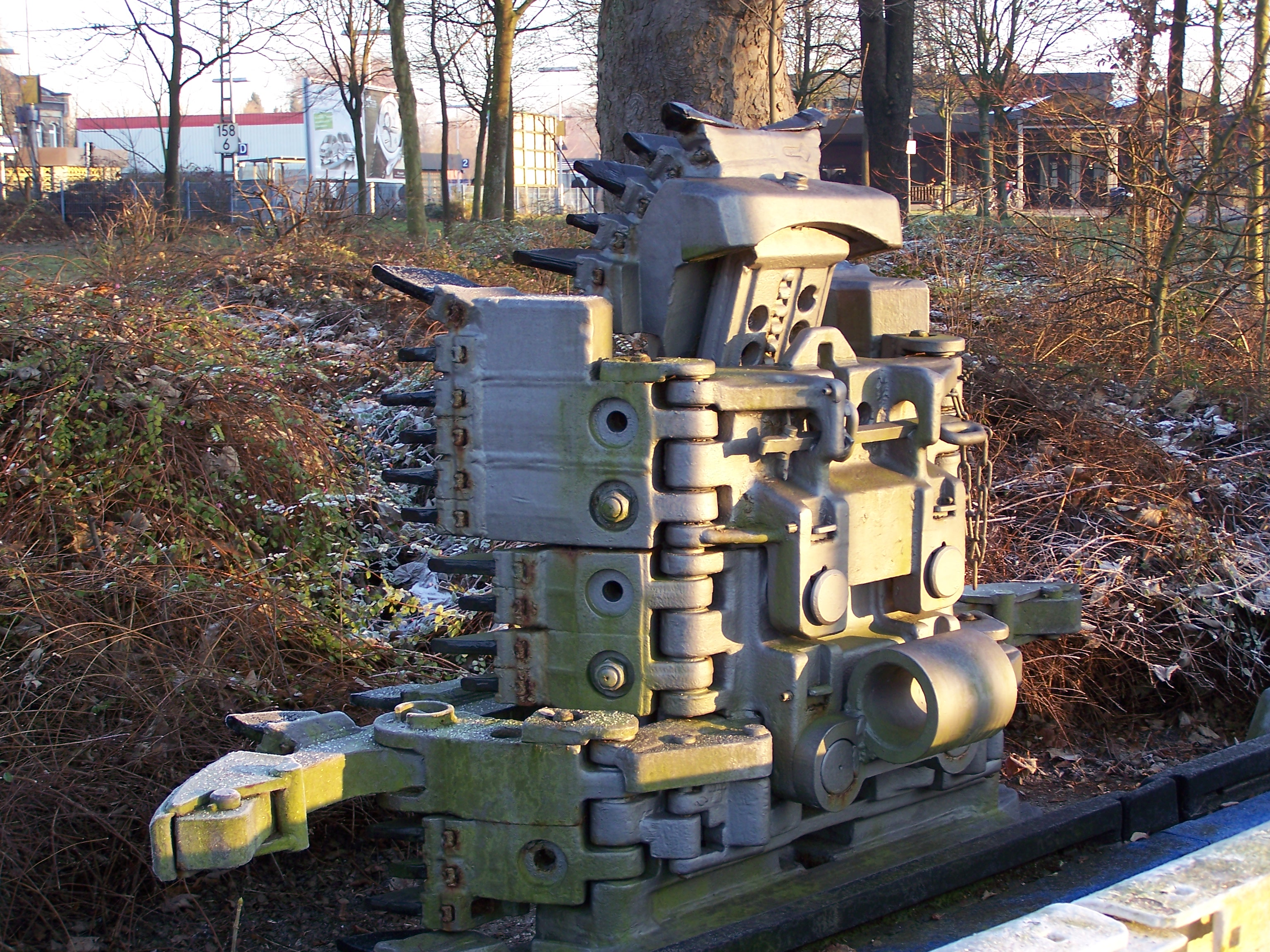
Kohlenhobel (coal plow) Monument in Ibbenbüren

He worked as a mining engineer in Ibbenbüren for German company Preussag. In 1937, Grebe invented the Kohlenhobel (coal plow). Grebe was married to Luise Grebe. He was buried at central cemetery in Ibbenbüren.

== Awards ==
- 1943: Ehrenzeichen pioneer of labour
- 1962: Rudolf-Diesel-Medaille

== Literature ==
- Hans Röhrs: Die Wiege des Kohlenhobels (with short biography of Konrad Grebes)
- Klaus Rotte: Kohlenhobel revolutionierte Bergbau: Konrad Grebe – Pionier der Arbeit. in: Ibbenbürener Volkszeitung, 30 December 1998
