= Annaberg, Lower Austria =

Annaberg
- Municipality
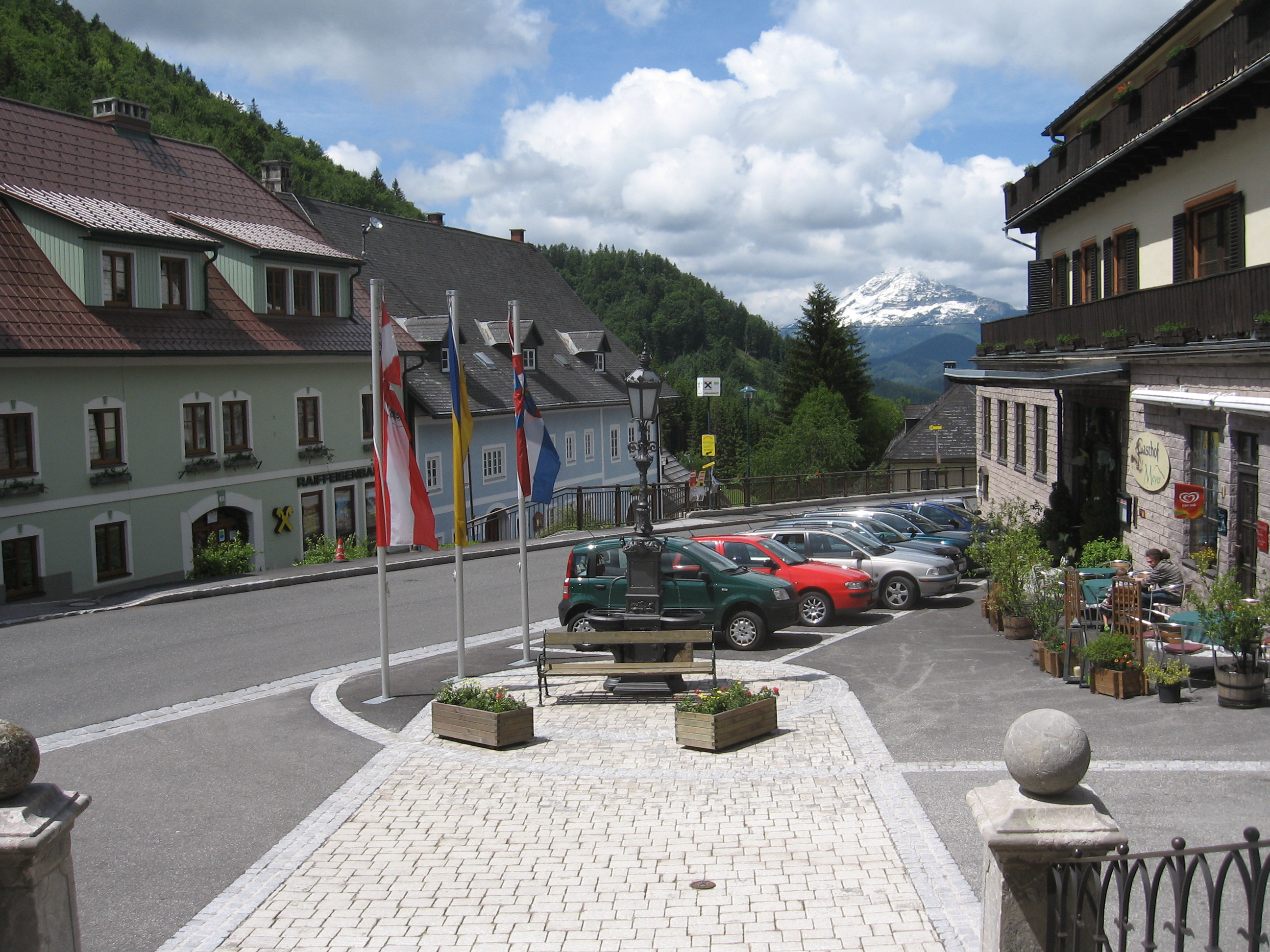
- Town center

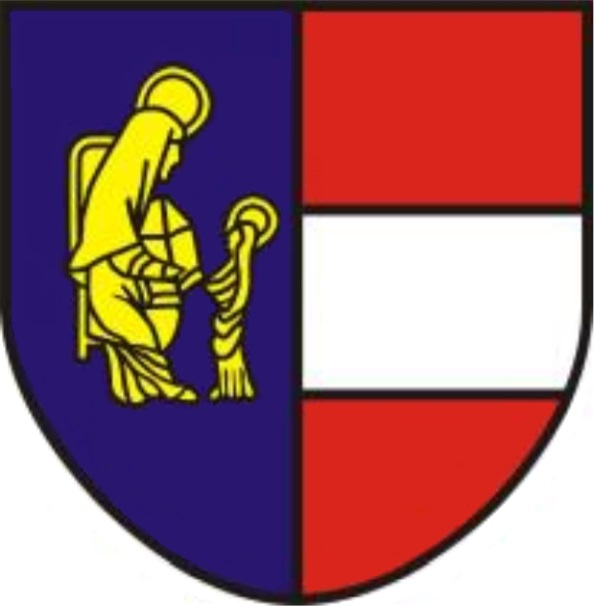
- Coat of arms

- Location within Austria
- Coordinates: 47°52′N 15°23′E
- Country: Austria
- State: Lower Austria
- District: Lilienfeld

Government
  - Mayor: Claudia Kubelka (ÖVP)

Area
  - Total: 63.51 km^{2} (24.52 sq mi)
- Elevation: 976 m (3,202 ft)

Population (2018-01-01)
  - Total: 533
  - Density: 8.39/km^{2} (21.7/sq mi)
- Time zone: UTC+1 (CET)
  - Summer (DST): UTC+2 (CEST)
- Postal code: 3222
- Area code: 02728
- Website: www.annaberg.gv.at

Annaberg is a town in the district of Lilienfeld in the Austrian state of Lower Austria.

== History ==
In September 2013 the village was the location of a shooting in which three police officers and an ambulance driver died after a poacher opened fire.

== Population ==
Historical population
Year	Pop.	±%
1971	1,040	—
1981	1,031	−0.9%
1991	891	−13.6%
2001	687	−22.9%
2014	537	−21.8%
