= Hirzweiler =

Coordinates: 49°24′N 7°05′E

Hirzweiler is a small village in Germany, in the Bundesland Saarland. The settlement was first mentioned in a document dated 1365. There are currently roughly 1,200 people living in Hirzweiler. Hirzweiler is in a jumelage (partnership) with the village of Walschbronn in France. Hirzweiler is one village of the municipality of (Gemeinde) Illingen, Saarland.
