= Alois Huber (politician) =

Swiss farmer and politician (born 1962)

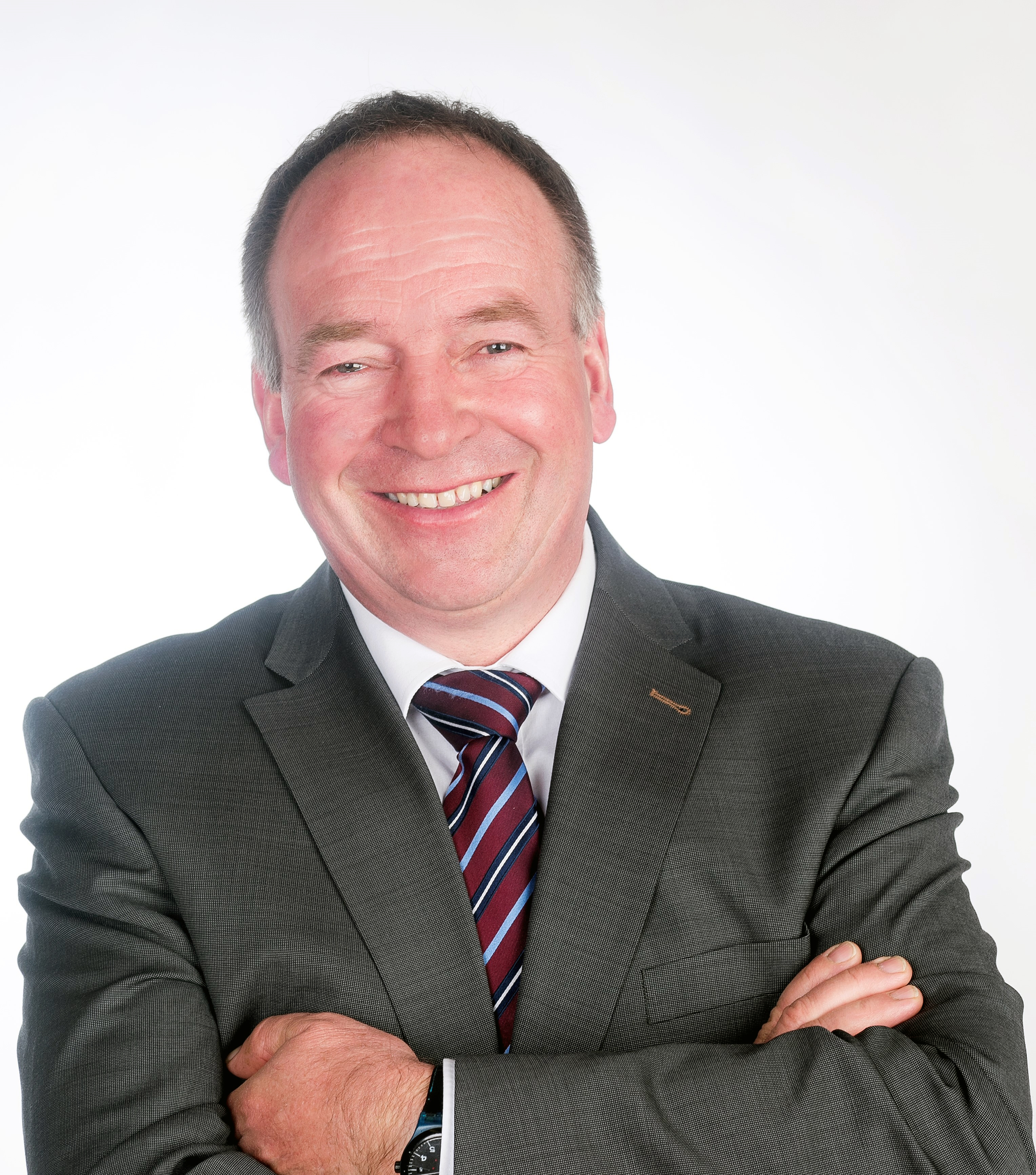
- Official portrait, 2019

Member of National Council (Switzerland)
- Incumbent
- Assumed office 2 March 2020
- Succeeded by: Jean-Pierre Gallati
- Constituency: Canton of Aargau

Personal details
- Born: Alois Huber; 21 November 1962 (age 63) Muri, Switzerland
- Party: Swiss People's Party
- Children: 5
- Occupation: Farmer, politician
- Website: Official website

Alois Huber (born 21 November 1962) is a Swiss farmer and politician. He was elected into National Council (Switzerland) for the Swiss People's Party as a replacement of Jean-Pierre Gallati who stepped back to take a seat on the Governing Council of Aargau.
