= Schiffweiler =

- Municipality
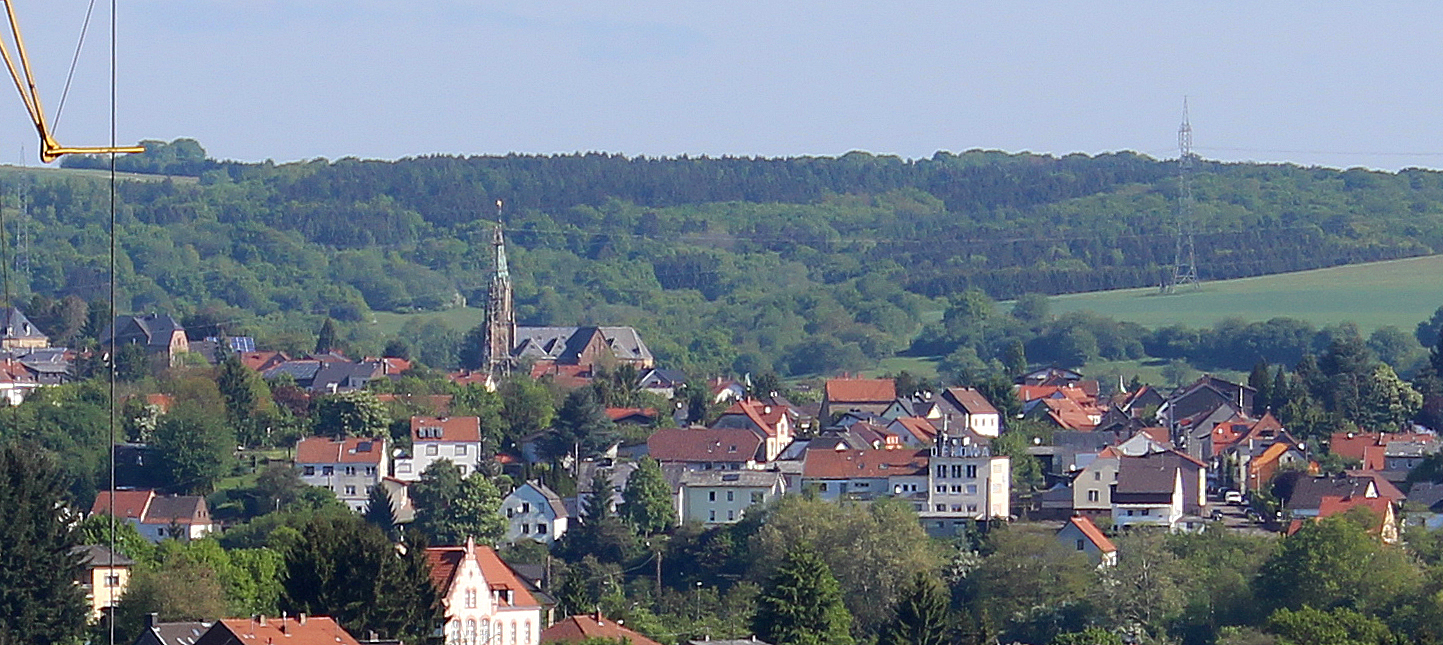
- General view

- Coat of arms

- Location of Schiffweiler within Neunkirchen district
- Interactive map of Schiffweiler
- Location within Germany Location within Saarland
- Coordinates: 49°22′N 7°7′E
- Country: Germany
- State: Saarland
- District: Neunkirchen
- Subdivisions: 4

Government
  - Mayor (2019–29): Markus Fuchs (SPD)

Area
  - Total: 21.42 km^{2} (8.27 sq mi)
- Elevation: 260–420 m (850–1,380 ft)

Population (2025-12-31)
  - Total: 15,832
  - Density: 739.1/km^{2} (1,914/sq mi)
- Time zone: UTC+01:00 (CET)
  - Summer (DST): UTC+02:00 (CEST)
- Postal codes: 66578
- Dialling codes: 06821 (06824)
- Vehicle registration: NK
- Website: www.schiffweiler.de

Schiffweiler (German pronunciation: [ˈʃɪfvaɪlɐ]) is a municipality in the district of Neunkirchen, in Saarland, Germany. It is situated approximately 5 km northwest of Neunkirchen, and 20 km northeast of Saarbrücken.

== People from Schiffweiler ==
- Konrad Grebe (1907–1972), German mining engineer and inventor of coal plow
