= Illingen, Saarland =

Illingen
- Municipality
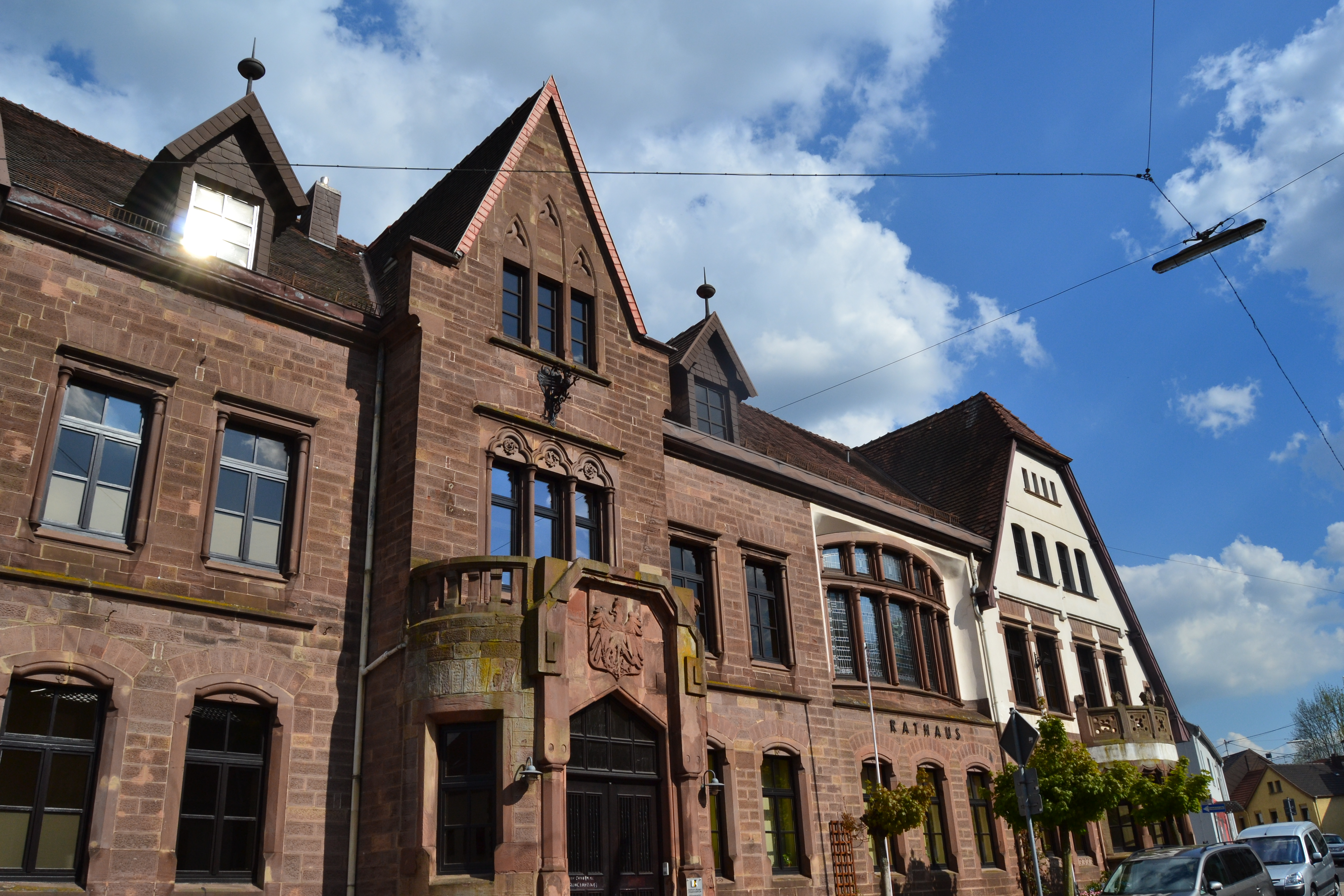
- Town hall

- Coat of arms

- Location of Illingen within Neunkirchen district
- Interactive map of Illingen
- Location within Germany Location within Saarland
- Coordinates: 49°22′N 7°2′E
- Country: Germany
- State: Saarland
- District: Neunkirchen
- Subdivisions: 6

Government
  - Mayor (2023–33): Andreas Hübgen (CDU)

Area
  - Total: 36.09 km^{2} (13.93 sq mi)
- Elevation: 352 m (1,155 ft)

Population (2025-12-31)
  - Total: 15,932
  - Density: 441.5/km^{2} (1,143/sq mi)
- Time zone: UTC+01:00 (CET)
  - Summer (DST): UTC+02:00 (CEST)
- Postal codes: 66549 und 66557
- Dialling codes: 06825
- Vehicle registration: NK
- Website: www.illingen.de

Illingen (German pronunciation: [ˈɪlɪŋən]) is a municipality in the district of Neunkirchen, in Saarland, Germany. It is situated approximately 10 km northwest of Neunkirchen, and 17 km northeast of Saarbrücken.

== Overview ==
Since 1974, the villages of Illingen, Hirzweiler, Hüttigweiler, Uchtelfangen, Welschbach and Wustweiler have been part of the Illingen community.

Illingen is a large, well maintained village with a pleasant castle complex, including a small modern Hotel with restaurant. The village St. Stephan church is very old and worth a visit. There are two train stops (Illingen and Gennweiler). Trains travel in the direction of Saarbrücken to the south and Lebach-Jabach to the north. The earliest written documentation which exists about Illingen is from the late 9th century. The Freiherr von Kerpen lived in the castle until the late 19th century. Excellent walks in the fields and woods around the residential areas are available.

== Gallery ==
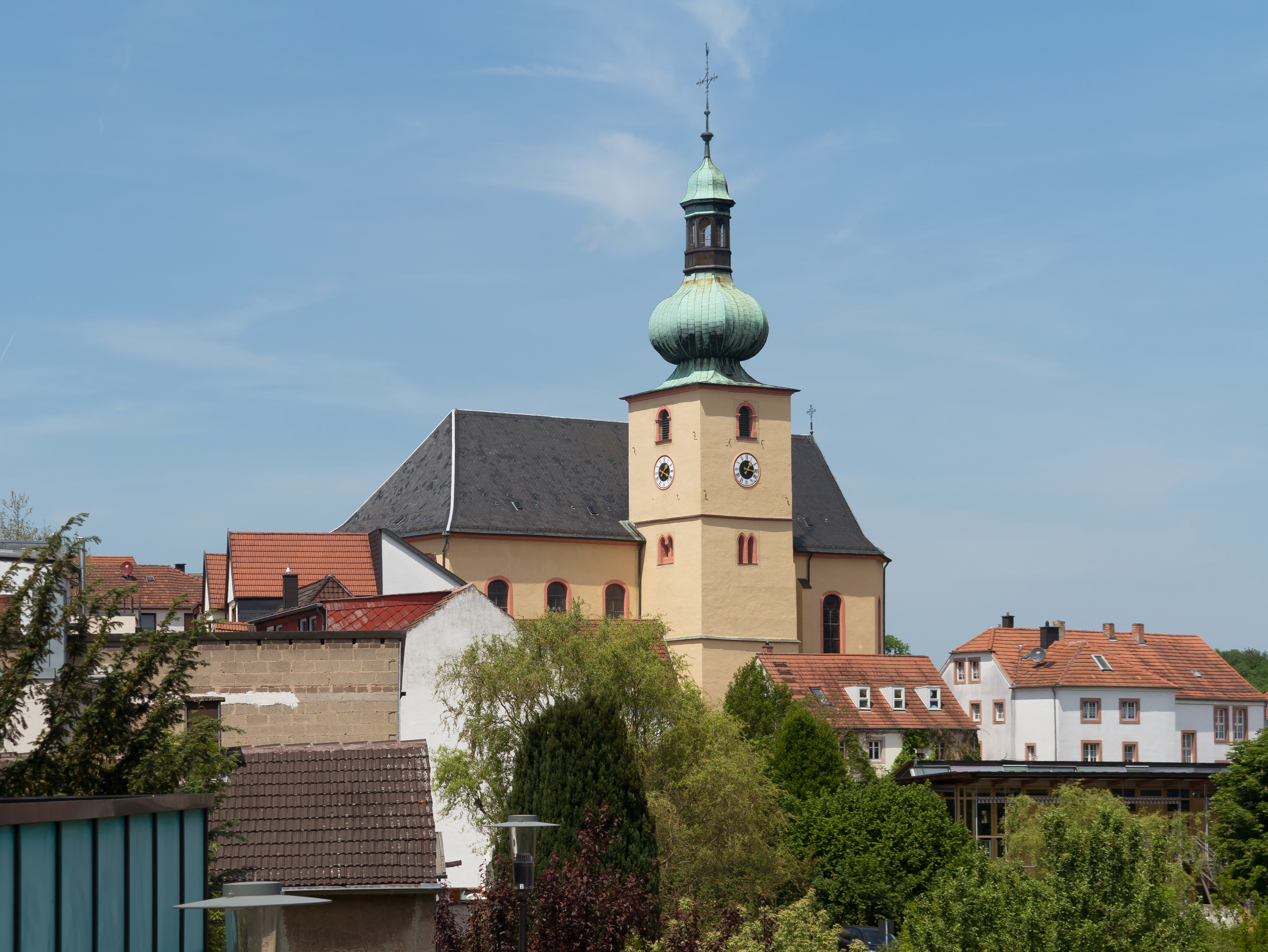
Illingen, church: die Sankt Stephan Kirche

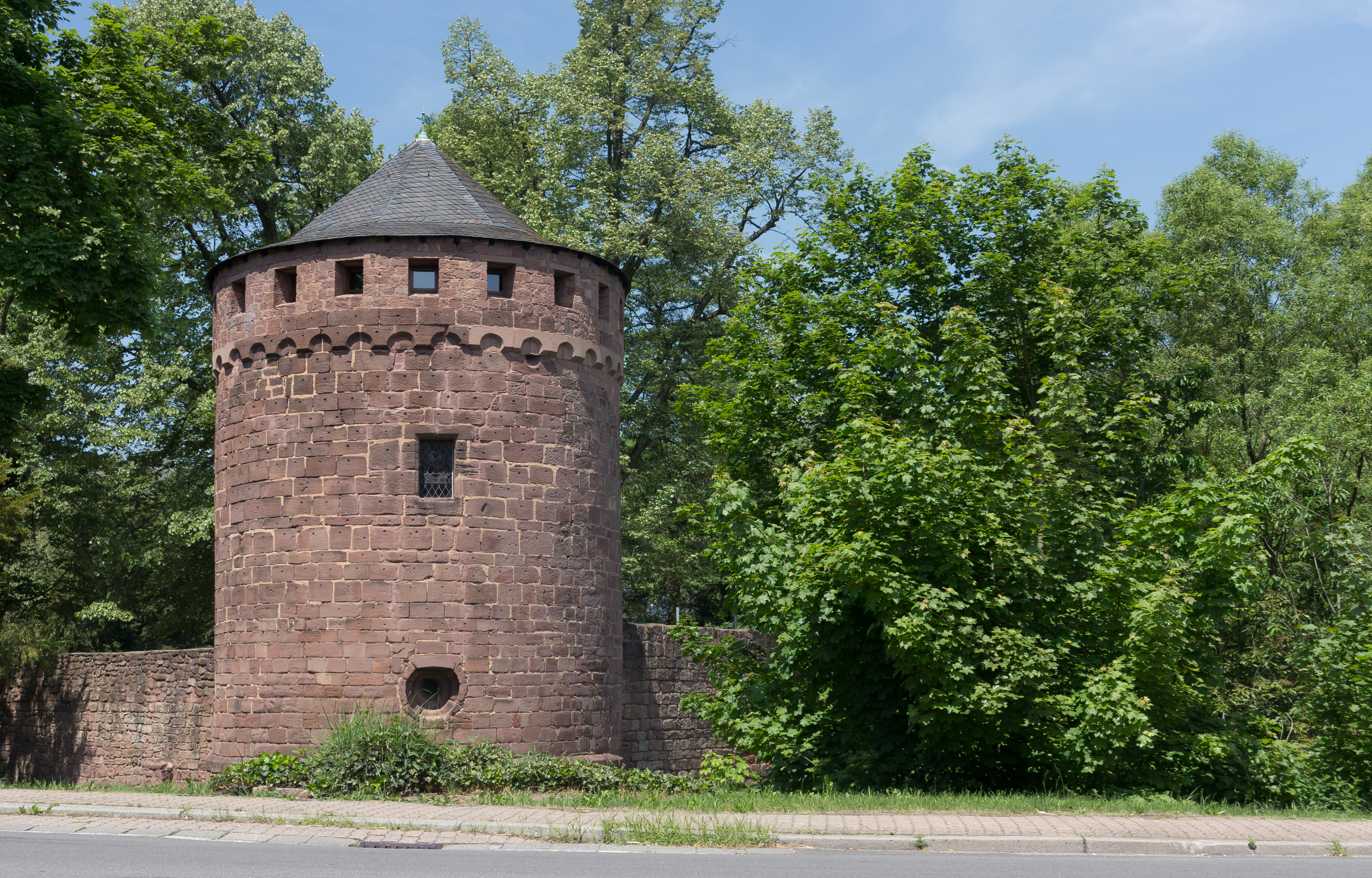
Illingen, tower of castle (Burg Kerpen)

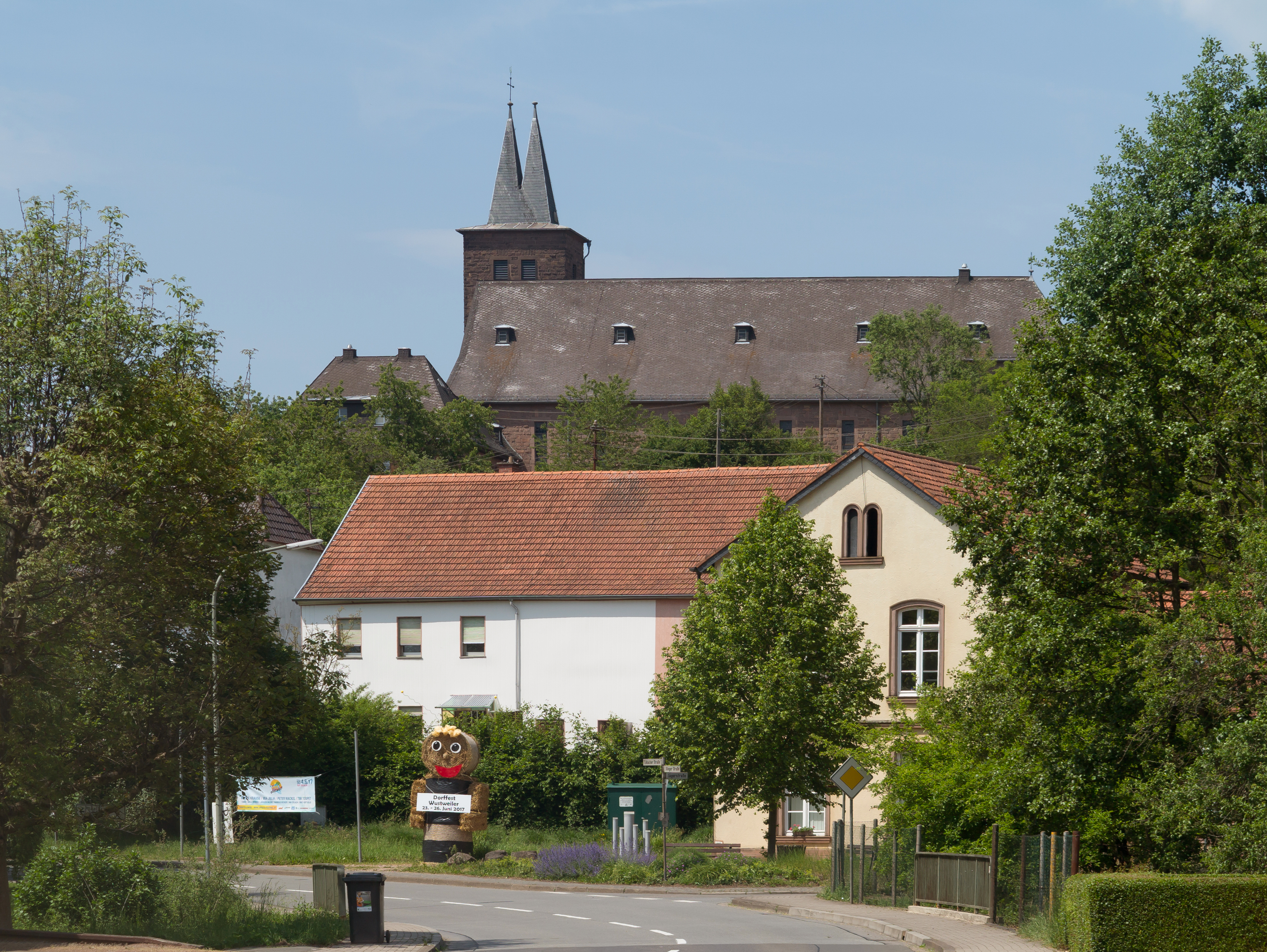
Wustweiler, catholic church: die Pfarrkirche Herz Jesu

== Notable people ==
- Peter Müller (born 1955), politician (CDU)
