= Merchweiler =

- Municipality
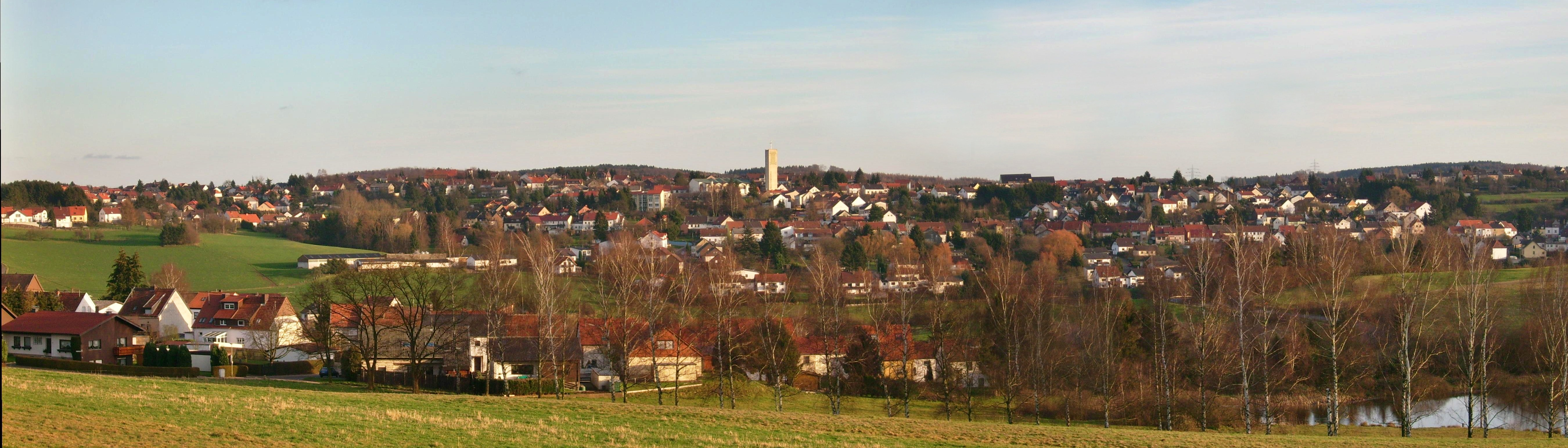
- Merchweiler

- Coat of arms

- Location of Merchweiler within Neunkirchen district
- Interactive map of Merchweiler
- Location within Germany Location within Saarland
- Coordinates: 49°21′N 7°2′E
- Country: Germany
- State: Saarland
- District: Neunkirchen
- Subdivisions: 2

Government
  - Mayor (2024–34): Sebastian Maas (CDU)

Area
  - Total: 12.8 km^{2} (4.9 sq mi)
- Elevation: 271–392 m (889–1,286 ft)

Population (2025-12-31)
  - Total: 10,081
  - Density: 788/km^{2} (2,040/sq mi)
- Time zone: UTC+01:00 (CET)
  - Summer (DST): UTC+02:00 (CEST)
- Postal codes: 66584–66589
- Dialling codes: 06825
- Vehicle registration: NK
- Website: www.merchweiler.de

Merchweiler (German pronunciation: [ˈmɛʁçvaɪlɐ]) is a municipality in the district of Neunkirchen, in Saarland, Germany. It is situated approximately 10 km (6.2 mi) west of Neunkirchen, and 15 km (9.3 mi) northeast of Saarbrücken. The municipality of Merchweiler consists of two parts: Merchweiler (village) and Wemmetsweiler (village).

== Twin towns – sister cities ==
Merchweiler is twinned with:

- Falicon, France (1987)
