= Rhineland-Palatinate Police =

State police of Rhineland-Palatinate

The Rhineland-Palatinate State Police is the state police (Landespolizei) of the German federal state of Rhineland-Palatinate and numbers ca. 9,000 police officers. The headquarters of the five regional police authorities are in Koblenz, Trier, Mainz, Kaiserslautern and Ludwigshafen.

The sleeve patch of the Rhineland-Palatinate Police.

Just like Hesse, Rhineland-Palatinate abolished the “green star” ranks; meaning Rhineland-Palatinate's police officers will begin their service as Probationary Inspectors (Polizeikommissaranwärter). This reform aims at making the police profession more attractive and improving promotion chances. Rhineland-Palatinate is also one of the federal states that does not train its cadets through the Bereitschaftspolizei anymore but has its own faculty at the State College of Public Administration. They also have a professional development school, which is under the guidance and responsibility of the police department in the Interior Ministry. The faculty and the school were combined at a new joint facility in 1996 located at the refurbished housing area of the former Hahn Air Base.

The Landeskriminalamt (State Investigation Bureau) was founded in 1947. Located at Mainz, the employment is composed of approximately 300 officers and 90 civilian staff. The bureau focuses its missions on the following—witness protection, state security, undercover investigations, statistics, monitoring the development of crime, crime prevention, criminal investigations analysis, exchange of information with foreign countries and forensic science.

The Police Support Group HQ (Direktion der Bereitschaftspolizei) in Mainz is in command of the two rapid reaction battalions (Bereitschaftspolizeiabteilungen) (BPA), the police helicopter squadron, the Spezialeinsatzkommando and close protection teams. The state's three police helicopters are stationed at Winningen airfield near Koblenz. The BPAs are situated in Enkenbach-Alsenborn and Wittlich serving as the state's mobile police reserve. The Bepo also controls the state working dog school and the state police orchestra.

Unlike other states, the Rhineland-Palatinate River Police is directly subordinate to the Ministry of the Interior. The HQ is in Mainz and there are 10 river police stations along the rivers Rhine and Moselle within the state.

== See also ==
- 2022 Police shooting in Germany
