= 2013 Annaberg shooting =

Police shootout

- Location: 47°52′11″N 15°19′40″E; Annaberg and Melk, Lower Austria, Austria
- Date: 16–17 September 2013
- Target: Police officers and paramedic
- Weapons: Guns: Steyr StG-77; Glock 17; Mauser hunting rifle
- Deaths: 5 (including the perpetrator)
- Injuries: 1
- Perpetrators: Alois Huber, age 55 (deceased)

On the night of 16 September 2013, Austrian police received a call about a suspected poacher in the woods near Annaberg, Lower Austria. Police officers attempted to inspect the vehicle of 55-year-old Alois Huber, but he sped off, later crashing his car in a ditch near Annaberg. While on the run, Huber killed several police officers and a Red Cross paramedic. He also kidnapped another officer while fleeing to his house in Melk. There, a standoff with the police occurred with about a hundred police and military officers present in armored vehicles. When the house was searched on 17 September, a fire was discovered burning in a secret basement, with the charred remains of a man suspected to be Huber.

== Details ==
=== Prior to the shootings ===
Since 2008, reports of poaching had occurred in Annaberg, with eight cases of poaching having been reported. In March 2011, a poacher was caught in the act by a hunter, but the poacher attacked the hunter and managed to escape. An investigation was launched, but the identity of the poacher remained unknown. Huber was known to be a poacher and had left dead animal heads on the roads in defiance of police and legal hunters. His hunting license was said to have been revoked.

=== Shooting spree ===
On the night of 16 September 2013, Austrian police received a call about a suspected poacher in the woods near Annaberg, Lower Austria. Police officers attempted to inspect the vehicle of 55-year-old Alois Huber, but he sped off upon spotting them and later crashed his car in a ditch near Annaberg. Huber then proceeded on foot and shot two police officers posted near a checkpoint in Annaberg. A Red Cross paramedic was also shot while providing aid to a casualty. One of the officers and the paramedic later died in the hospital, while the other officer survived his wounds. At another checkpoint, Huber shot and killed another officer while taking a fourth hostage. He then stole a police car and drove it to his farmhouse near Melk.

=== Standoff ===
A standoff began, as Huber had fled into his house. Austrian police had the area surrounded by 07:00 on 17 September. A hundred police officers were called to the scene and shots were sporadically fired by Huber, who was suspected of having stocked up a large supply of arms and ammunition there, as he owned several hunting weapons legally. It was also reported that children of Huber's might be at the location. Police sought to make contact with Huber, using his relatives to aid them. At 13:38, Austrian police requested the assistance of the Austrian army, which sent in three armored vehicles. As police moved closer to the house, they found the stolen police car at around 15:00, with the dead body of the kidnapped officer inside. At 17:30, Huber fired his last shot at police.

On the night of 17 September, at 18:20, Austria's anti-terrorism police unit EKO Cobra investigated the farmhouse. A hidden basement was found with the burned body of a man inside; the fire seemed to have been started by the man himself. Police suspected it to be the body of Huber, although DNA research still needs to confirm this. Earlier reports that Huber had been shot in the abdomen during the standoff by police have not yet been confirmed. No further people were found at the premises.

=== Victims ===
The three police officers were aged between 38 and 51. The paramedic was identified as 70-year-old Johann Dorfwirth from the Austrian Red Cross; he was a longtime paramedic with the organization who had received several awards for his service.

== Perpetrator ==
55-year-old Alois Huber was tentatively identified as the suspected perpetrator of the shootings by police. He was single and the owner of a transport company. He was also known to be a poacher.

== Reactions ==
On 17 September, around 16:00, Fritz Neugebauer, Second President of the National Council of Austria, interrupted the parliament hearing to inform the delegates of the incident. They then had several minutes of silence for the fallen victims. The Interior Minister of Austria, Johanna Mikl-Leitner, gave her condolences to the families of the victims. She said that the shooting had no precedent in the history of Austrian police. She thanked the police present for the solving of the case. The provincial government of Lower Austria ordered that black flags would be flown for the victims of the shooting.

== See also ==
- 2022 Kusel shooting
