= Neunkirchen (German district) =

Coordinates: 49°20′N 7°10′E

- District
- Flag Coat of arms
- Country: Germany
- State: Saarland
- Capital: Neunkirchen

Government
  - District admin.: Sören Meng (SPD)

Area
  - Total: 249.16 km^{2} (96.20 sq mi)

Population (31 December 2025)
  - Total: 132,607
  - Density: 532.22/km^{2} (1,378.4/sq mi)
- Time zone: UTC+01:00 (CET)
  - Summer (DST): UTC+02:00 (CEST)
- Vehicle registration: NK (since 1974); OTW (1957–1974); OE 3/ OE 13/ OE 23/ OE 33 (1949–1956); SA 03 (1945–1949)
- Website: landkreis-neunkirchen.de

Neunkirchen (German: [ˈnɔʏnkɪʁçn̩]) is a Kreis (district) in the middle of the Saarland, Germany. Neighboring districts are Sankt Wendel, Saarpfalz, Saarbrücken, and Saarlouis in Saarland and Kusel in Rhineland-Palatinate.

== History ==
In 1814, the district Ottweiler was created; however, its history can be traced back to 1545 when it was created as Herrschaft Ottweiler, later Amt and Oberamt Ottweiler, and during the Napoleonic times as Kanton Ottweiler. Two years after its creation, it was reorganized in 1816 by order of the Congress of Vienna. In 1866, an attempt to move the district capital to Neunkirchen failed. In 1974, the districts were reorganized, the biggest change however was the change of the capital and thus the name to Neunkirchen. Some parts of the administration remained in Ottweiler.

== Geography ==
The entire district is located in the industrial area, which is centered in Saarbrücken. It is situated on either bank of the Blies, a major tributary of the Saar River.

== Coat of arms ==
The top part of the coat of arms show the lion of Nassau, as the area was ruled by a branch of the house of Nassau (Nassau-Saarbrücken, later Nassau-Ottweiler). In the bottom part it shows the main symbols of the two biggest cities in the district, the rose of Ottweiler and the wheel of Neunkirchen.

== Towns and municipalities ==
Clickable map of towns and municipalities in the district

Towns
1. Neunkirchen
2. Ottweiler
Municipalities
1. Eppelborn
2. Illingen
3. Merchweiler
4. Schiffweiler
5. Spiesen-Elversberg
