= Eppelborn =

- Municipality
- Coat of arms

- Location of Eppelborn within Neunkirchen district
- Interactive map of Eppelborn
- Location within Germany Location within Saarland
- Coordinates: 49°23′N 6°58′E
- Country: Germany
- State: Saarland
- District: Neunkirchen
- Subdivisions: 8

Government
  - Mayor (2019–29): Andreas Feld (CDU)

Area
  - Total: 47.25 km^{2} (18.24 sq mi)
- Elevation: 300–400 m (980–1,310 ft)

Population (2025-12-31)
  - Total: 16,611
  - Density: 351.6/km^{2} (910.5/sq mi)
- Time zone: UTC+01:00 (CET)
  - Summer (DST): UTC+02:00 (CEST)
- Postal codes: 66566–66571
- Dialling codes: 06881, 06827 und 06806
- Vehicle registration: NK
- Website: www.eppelborn.de

Eppelborn (German pronunciation: [ˈɛpl̩bɔʁn]; Saarländisch: Ebbelborn or Ebbelborre) is a municipality in the district of Neunkirchen, in Saarland, Germany. The municipality encompasses 7 villages: Eppelborn, Wiesbach, Dirmingen, Humes, Habach, Hierscheid, Bubach-Calmesweiler und Macherbach.

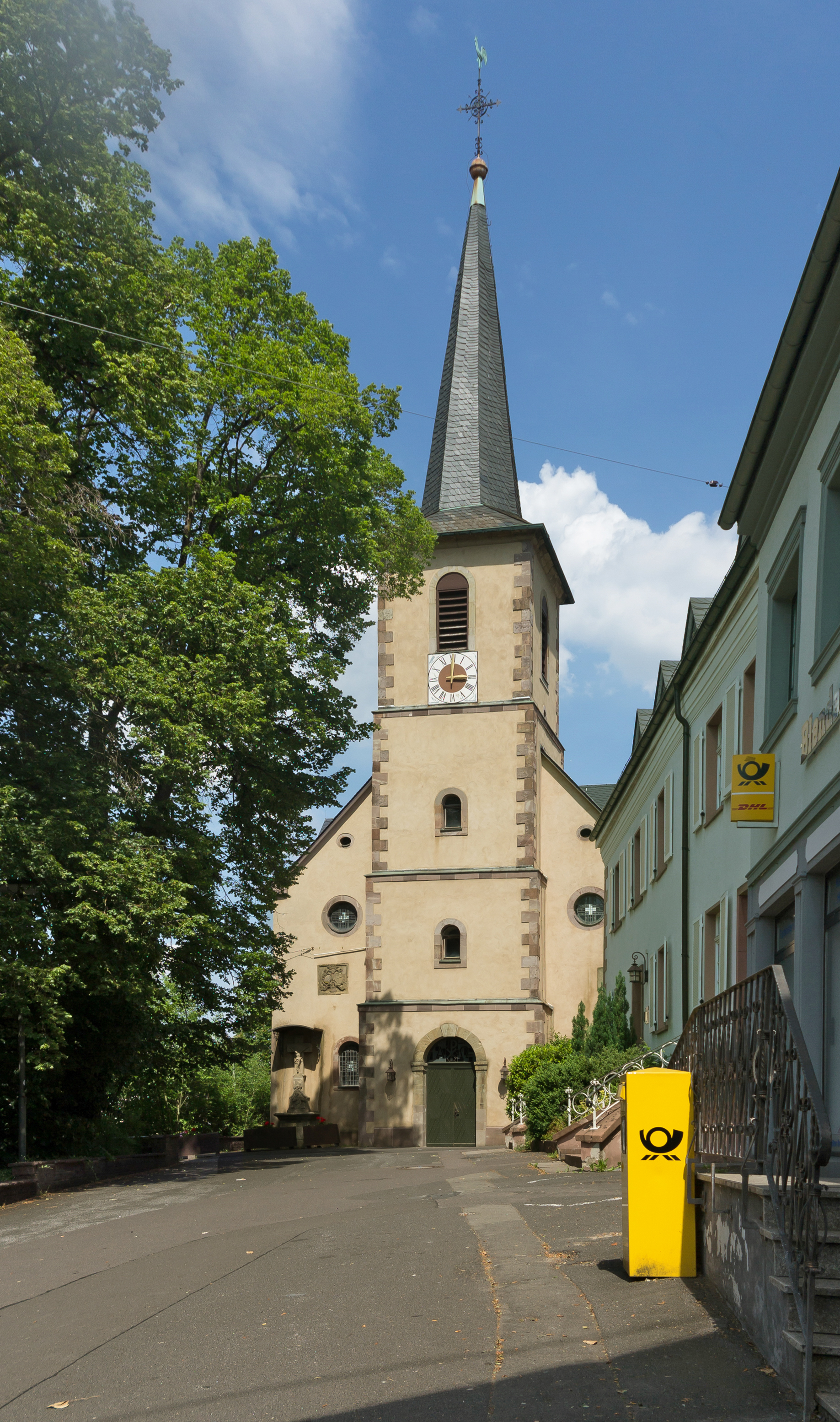
Eppelborn, catholic church: Pfarrkirche Sankt Sebastian

It is situated approximately 20 km north of Saarbrücken.
