= Sulzbach, Saarland =

Sulzbach
- Town
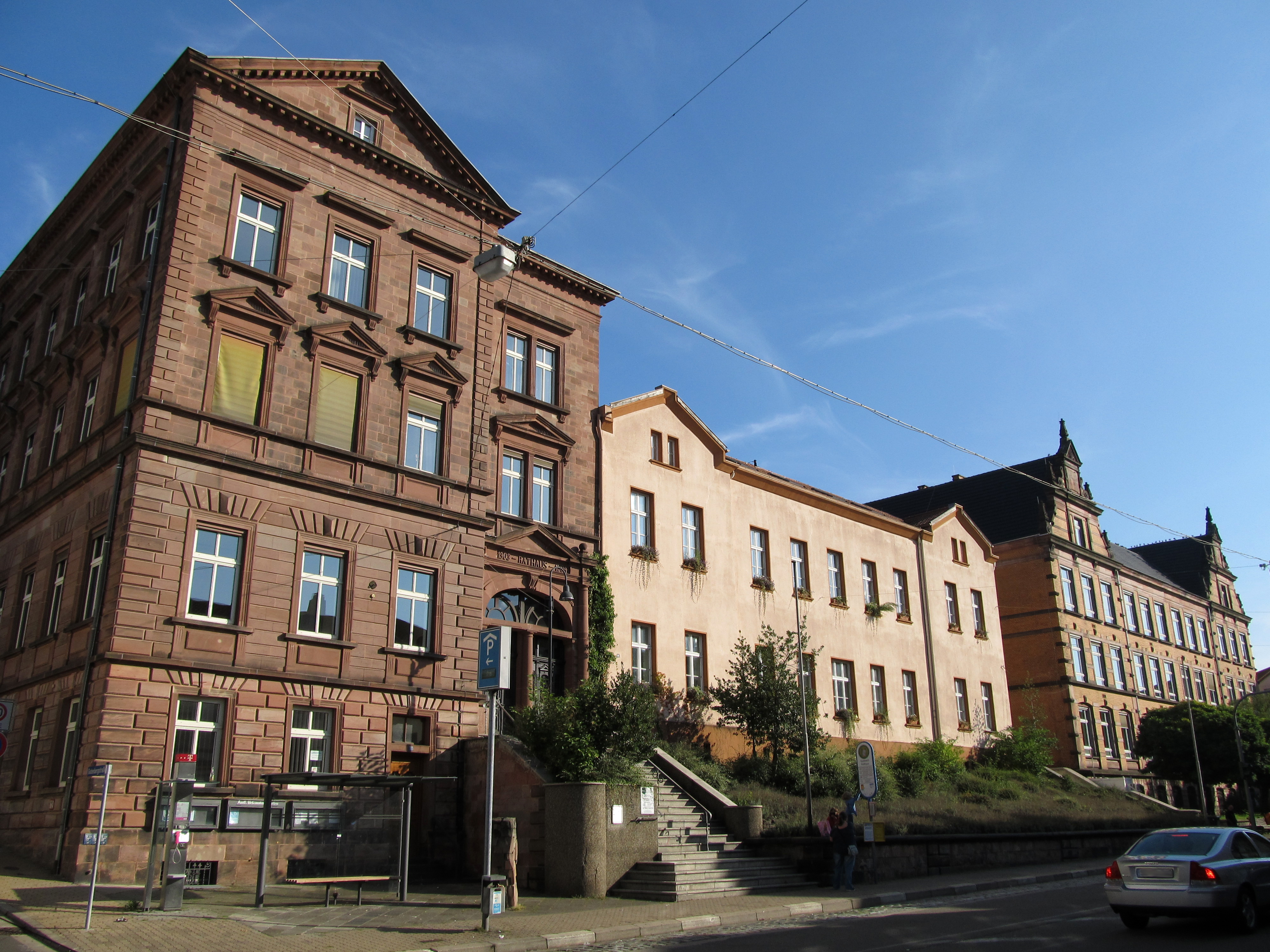
- Town hall

- Flag Coat of arms

- Location of Sulzbach within Saarbrücken district
- Interactive map of Sulzbach
- Location within Germany Location within Saarland
- Coordinates: 49°17′N 7°4′E
- Country: Germany
- State: Saarland
- District: Saarbrücken
- Subdivisions: 7

Government
  - Mayor (2019–29): Michael Adam (CDU)

Area
  - Total: 16.07 km^{2} (6.20 sq mi)
- Elevation: 331 m (1,086 ft)

Population (2025-12-31)
  - Total: 16,191
  - Density: 1,008/km^{2} (2,609/sq mi)
- Time zone: UTC+01:00 (CET)
  - Summer (DST): UTC+02:00 (CEST)
- Postal codes: 66272–66280
- Dialling codes: 06897
- Vehicle registration: SB
- Website: www.stadt-sulzbach.de

Sulzbach (German pronunciation: [ˈzʊltsbax]) is a town and a municipality in the district of Saarbrücken, in Saarland, Germany with a population of 16,215 (as of Dec 2015). It is situated approximately 10 km (6 mi) northeast of Saarbrücken.

Following reforms of the regional government in 1974, Schnappach, previously part of St. Ingbert, was incorporated by Sulzbach.

== Economy and Infrastructure ==
Major employers include Knappschaftskrankenhaus Sulzbach, as well as HYDAC group.

Sulzbach (Saar) station is located on the Bingen (Rhein)–Saarbrücken railway.
