= Neunkirchen, Saarland =

Neunkirchen Neinkeije (Palatine German)
- Town
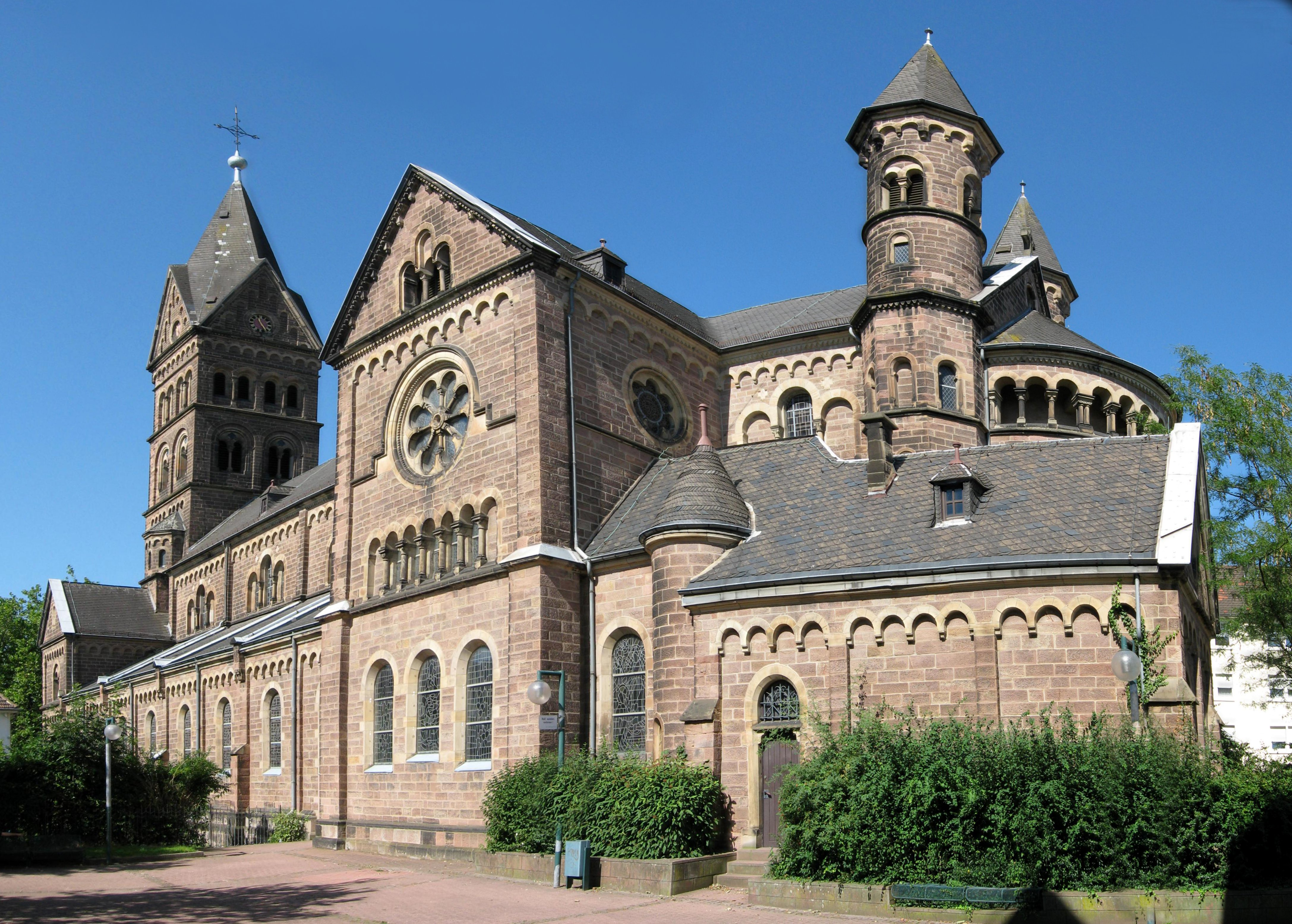
- St. Marien

- Flag Coat of arms

- Location of Neunkirchen within Neunkirchen district
- Interactive map of Neunkirchen
- Location within Germany Location within Saarland
- Coordinates: 49°21′N 7°10′E
- Country: Germany
- State: Saarland
- District: Neunkirchen
- Subdivisions: 10 Stadtteile

Government
  - Mayor (2019–29): Jörg Aumann (SPD)

Area
  - Total: 75.26 km^{2} (29.06 sq mi)
- Elevation: 252 m (827 ft)

Population (2025-12-31)
  - Total: 46,896
  - Density: 623.1/km^{2} (1,614/sq mi)
- Time zone: UTC+01:00 (CET)
  - Summer (DST): UTC+02:00 (CEST)
- Postal codes: 66538–66540
- Dialling codes: 06821
- Vehicle registration: NK
- Website: www.neunkirchen.de

Neunkirchen (German pronunciation: [ˈnɔʏnkɪʁçn̩]; Palatine German: Neinkeije) is a town and a municipality in Saarland, Germany. It is the largest town and the seat of the district of Neunkirchen. It is situated on the river Blies, approx. 20 km northeast of Saarbrücken. With about 50,000 inhabitants, Neunkirchen is Saarland's second largest city.

== Overview ==
The name of the town derives from "An der neuen Kirche" meaning "by the new church" not from "nine churches" as one might be tempted to assume. In the past, Neunkirchen's economy has been shaped almost exclusively by coal and steel. With the decline of this industry sector, Neunkirchen's economy had to face drastic changes and underwent a significant shift towards the service and retail sector, although smaller industries still remain.

== History ==
=== Early history ===
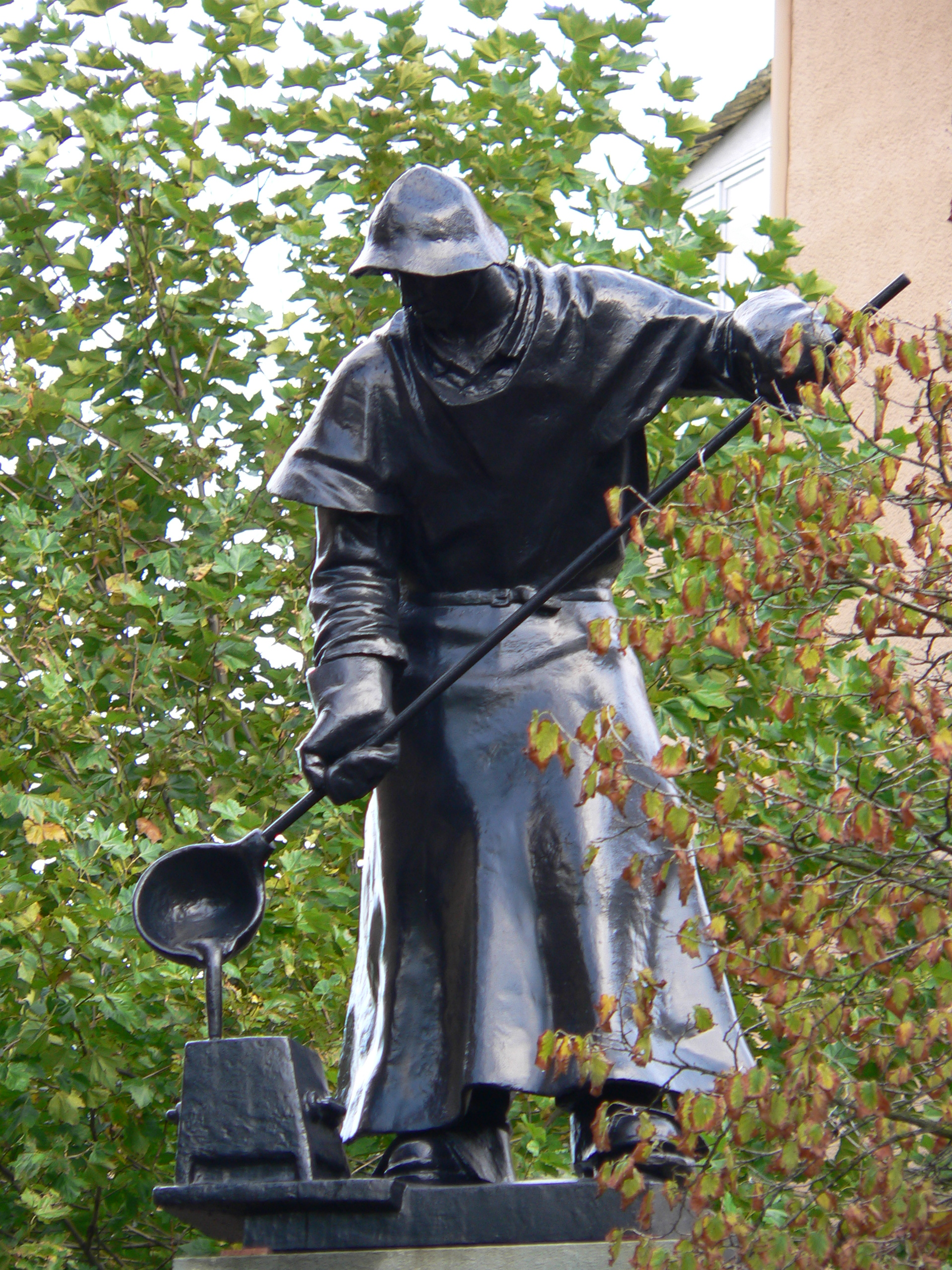
Casting monument at Hüttenberg, by Fritz Koelle

The earliest settlements in the area can be dated back to 700 BC. The oldest part of the town is the village of Wiebelskirchen north of the town centre; its name has been recorded as early as 765 AD and is thus the oldest Christian name in town ("Kirche" means church). The name "Neunkirchen" is recorded for the first time in 1281.

Neunkirchen belonged to the principality of Nassau-Saarbrücken, who erected two castles: a renaissance castle and Schloss Jägersberg. Both castles do not exist anymore today, but the ruins of the Renaissance castle are now the base of a little park-like area.

The famous German poet, geologist and author Johann Wolfgang von Goethe visited Neunkirchen and described the Castle and the Ironworks.

=== Weimar Republic ===
Neunkirchen was awarded township as late as 1922 after having been the largest village in Prussia for some time.

=== Nazi era and World War II ===
On 10 February 1933, an explosion of a giant gas tank at the ironwork caused 68 casualties, 190 injured. The damage spread over a part of the factory and also hit a nearby residential area and a school building. The duration of repair work and temporary closing of the damaged parts of the iron works was about nine months. This event caused worldwide media attention.

Having a big ironworks complex right in the town centre made the town a target for Allied bomb raids in the Second World War. In 1945, an air raid destroyed about three quarters of the town centre. As a result, there is a large number of unexploded ordnance from WW2 still present in the area today and around 1/3 of the city consists of buildings from before 1945.

=== Post World War II ===
On September 10, 1987, General Secretary of the Socialist Unity Party Erich Honecker visited his birthplace Neunkirchen.

== Climate ==
Neunkirchen's climate is classified as oceanic (Köppen: Cfb; Trewartha: Dobk). The average annual temperature in Neunkirchen is 10.1 °C (50.2 °F). The average annual rainfall is 871.1 mm (34.30 in) with December as the wettest month. The temperatures are highest on average in July, at around 18.9 °C (66.0 °F), and lowest in January, at around 2.1 °C (35.8 °F).

The Neunkirchen weather station has recorded the following extreme values:

- Highest Temperature 40.2 °C (104.4 °F) on 25 July 2019.
- Warmest Minimum 22.8 °C (73.0 °F) on 6 July 1991.
- Coldest Maximum −11.1 °C (12.0 °F) on 12 January 1987.
- Lowest Temperature −20.0 °C (−4.0 °F) on 1–2 January 1971.
- Highest Daily Precipitation 65.2 mm (2.57 in) on 9 July 2017.
- Wettest Month 308.5 mm (12.15 in) in December 1993.
- Wettest Year 1,131.2 mm (44.54 in) in 2000.
- Driest Year 532.2 mm (20.95 in) in 1976.
- Earliest Snowfall: 17 November 1972.
- Latest Snowfall: 27 April 1981.

Climate data for Neunkirchen (1991−2020 normals, extremes 1970–present)
| Month | Jan | Feb | Mar | Apr | May | Jun | Jul | Aug | Sep | Oct | Nov | Dec | Year |
|---|---|---|---|---|---|---|---|---|---|---|---|---|---|
| Record high °C (°F) | 15.2 (59.4) | 21.3 (70.3) | 25.7 (78.3) | 28.7 (83.7) | 32.2 (90.0) | 36.8 (98.2) | 40.2 (104.4) | 38.1 (100.6) | 33.2 (91.8) | 28.3 (82.9) | 21.6 (70.9) | 17.9 (64.2) | 40.2 (104.4) |
| Mean maximum °C (°F) | 11.9 (53.4) | 13.9 (57.0) | 18.9 (66.0) | 24.6 (76.3) | 28.1 (82.6) | 31.1 (88.0) | 33.1 (91.6) | 32.7 (90.9) | 27.2 (81.0) | 22.4 (72.3) | 16.3 (61.3) | 12.3 (54.1) | 35.1 (95.2) |
| Mean daily maximum °C (°F) | 4.9 (40.8) | 6.6 (43.9) | 11.0 (51.8) | 15.9 (60.6) | 19.8 (67.6) | 23.1 (73.6) | 25.3 (77.5) | 24.8 (76.6) | 20.5 (68.9) | 15.0 (59.0) | 8.9 (48.0) | 5.5 (41.9) | 15.1 (59.2) |
| Daily mean °C (°F) | 2.1 (35.8) | 2.6 (36.7) | 5.8 (42.4) | 9.7 (49.5) | 13.8 (56.8) | 17.0 (62.6) | 18.9 (66.0) | 18.1 (64.6) | 14.1 (57.4) | 9.9 (49.8) | 5.7 (42.3) | 2.9 (37.2) | 10.1 (50.2) |
| Mean daily minimum °C (°F) | −0.9 (30.4) | −1.1 (30.0) | 1.0 (33.8) | 3.3 (37.9) | 7.3 (45.1) | 10.6 (51.1) | 12.6 (54.7) | 11.9 (53.4) | 8.6 (47.5) | 5.6 (42.1) | 2.5 (36.5) | 0.2 (32.4) | 5.1 (41.2) |
| Mean minimum °C (°F) | −9.7 (14.5) | −8.7 (16.3) | −5.6 (21.9) | −2.8 (27.0) | 0.5 (32.9) | 4.6 (40.3) | 7.1 (44.8) | 6.0 (42.8) | 2.9 (37.2) | −1.3 (29.7) | −4.3 (24.3) | −8.0 (17.6) | −12.4 (9.7) |
| Record low °C (°F) | −20.0 (−4.0) | −19.4 (−2.9) | −16.5 (2.3) | −5.6 (21.9) | −2.2 (28.0) | 0.0 (32.0) | 3.9 (39.0) | 3.0 (37.4) | −1.5 (29.3) | −7.6 (18.3) | −13.8 (7.2) | −19.5 (−3.1) | −20.0 (−4.0) |
| Average precipitation mm (inches) | 84.2 (3.31) | 68.6 (2.70) | 70.1 (2.76) | 50.6 (1.99) | 73.0 (2.87) | 64.0 (2.52) | 72.7 (2.86) | 68.7 (2.70) | 62.1 (2.44) | 64.6 (2.54) | 77.2 (3.04) | 115.1 (4.53) | 871.1 (34.30) |
| Average extreme snow depth cm (inches) | 4.6 (1.8) | 4.9 (1.9) | 2.0 (0.8) | 0.1 (0.0) | 0 (0) | 0 (0) | 0 (0) | 0 (0) | 0 (0) | 0 (0) | 2.1 (0.8) | 5.2 (2.0) | 9.9 (3.9) |
| Average precipitation days (≥ 0.1 mm) | 16.7 | 15.6 | 14.9 | 12.7 | 13.9 | 13.3 | 12.9 | 13.2 | 12.3 | 14.2 | 16.3 | 19.0 | 175.0 |
| Average relative humidity (%) | 84.5 | 80.8 | 75.0 | 69.7 | 71.2 | 71.2 | 70.9 | 74.0 | 79.5 | 84.2 | 86.8 | 87.3 | 77.9 |
Source: DWD Open Data

== Economy ==
There are traces of surface coal mining that reach back as far as 700BC. Later on, coal was mined underground until 1968. In 1593, the first ironworks were constructed in the Blies valley. The iron ore used was from local origin.

Much of the city's fate was influenced by the von Stumm-Halberg family, who owned the local ironworks from 1806 onwards, and thus had enormous influence on the local politics.

Due to the decline of the coal and steel industry, the local economy faced aggravating hardships. With the last coal mine closing down in 1968 and the major part of the ironworks complex closing down in 1982 (only a steel-mill is still in service today), the unemployment rate rose drastically.

Meanwhile, the city has transformed into a "shopping town", a process that had been started with the construction of a large shopping centre on the grounds of the former steelworks.

Remnants of the former steelworks that had not been destroyed meanwhile have been preserved and renovated. They now serve as an industrial monument; parts of them feature small pubs, clubs, a cinema, the first of the German branch of Hooters of America, Inc restaurants and a radio studio of the McDonald's fast food chain.

== Transportation ==
Bundesautobahn 8 and Bundestrasse 41 both pass through Neunkirchen. The local train station sees daily service to local and regional destinations provided by Vlexx

== Twin towns – sister cities ==
Neunkirchen is twinned with:

- Lübben, Germany
- Mantes-la-Ville, France
- Wolsztyn, Poland

== Notable people ==
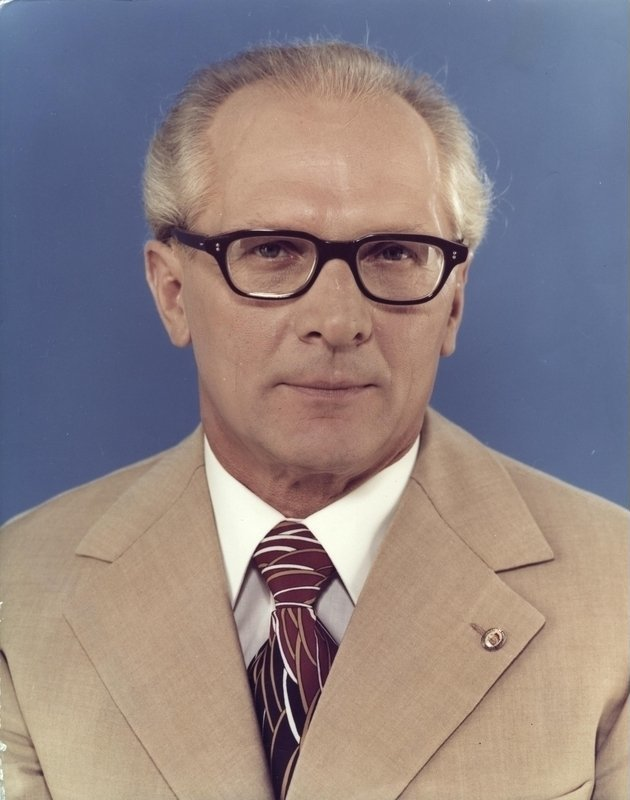
Erich Honecker in 1976

- Julius Adler (1894–1945), politician, Member of Reichstag (KPD)
- Walter Rilla (1894–1980), actor
- Erich Honecker (1912–1994), Leader of East Germany 1976–1989
- Karl Rawer (1913–2018), physicist
- Karl Ferdinand Werner (1924–2008), historian
- Wolfgang Kermer (born 1935), art historian, artist, author, professor, rector State Academy of Fine Arts Stuttgart (1971–1984)
- Stefan Kuntz (born 1962), football player and coach
- Thomas Hayo (born 1969), advertiser
- Alexandra Kertz-Welzel (born 1970), Professor of Music Education at LMU Munich
- Shanta Ghosh (born 1975), athlete
- Tobias Hans (born 1978), politician (CDU), Minister President of Saarland
- Roland Theis (born 1980), politician (CDU)
- Nora-Eugenie Gomringer (born 1980), Swiss-German poet and writer
- Johannes Wurtz (born 1992), footballer
- Lena Lattwein (born 2000), footballer
