= Saarlouis (electoral district) =

Federal electoral district of Germany

297 Saarlouis
- Electoral district for the Bundestag
- Saarlouis in 2025
- State: Saarland
- Population: 262,400 (2019)
- Electorate: 203,279 (2021)
- Major settlements: Saarlouis; Merzig; Dillingen
- Area: 893.2 km^{2}

Current electoral district
- Created: 1957
- Party: CDU
- Member: Philip Hoffmann
- Elected: 2025

Saarlouis is an electoral constituency (German: Wahlkreis) represented in the Bundestag. It elects one member via first-past-the-post voting. Under the current constituency numbering system, it is designated as constituency 297. It is located in western Saarland, comprising the Merzig-Wadern district and most of the district of Saarlouis district.

Saarlouis was created for the inaugural 1957 federal election after the accession of Saarland to Germany. From 2021 to 2025, it was represented by Heiko Maas of the Social Democratic Party (SPD). Since 2025 it has been represented by Philipp Hofmann of the CDU.

== Geography ==
Saarlouis is located in western Saarland. As of the 2021 federal election, it comprises the Merzig-Wadern district and the Saarlouis district excluding the Lebach and Schmelz municipalities.

== History ==
Saarlouis was created in 1957, then known as Saarlouis – Merzig. It acquired its current name in the 1965 election. In the 1957 and 1961 elections, it was constituency 245 in the numbering system. In the 1965 through 1998 elections, it was number 246. Since the 2002 election, it has been number 297.

Originally, the constituency comprised the Merzig-Wadern district and the Saarlouis district excluding the Ämter of Bous/Saar, Lebach, Schmelz, and Wadgassen. In the 1965 through 1972 elections, it lost the municipality of Schwalbach from the Saarlouis district. In the 1976 through 1998 elections, it acquired a configuration similar to its current borders, but lacking the municipalities of Bous, Ensdorf, Schwalbach, and Wadgassen from the Saarlouis district. It acquired its current borders in the 2002 election.

Election	No.	Name	Borders
1957	245	Saarlouis – Merzig	Merzig-Wadern district; Saarlouis district (excluding Bous/Saar, Lebach, Schmelz, and Wadgassen Ämter)
1961	245	Saarlouis – Merzig	Merzig-Wadern district; Saarlouis district (excluding Bous/Saar, Lebach, Schmelz, and Wadgassen Ämter)
1965	246	Saarlouis	Merzig-Wadern district; Saarlouis district (excluding Schwalbach municipality and Bous/Saar, Lebach, Schmelz, and Wadgassen Ämter)
1969	246	Saarlouis	Merzig-Wadern district; Saarlouis district (excluding Schwalbach municipality and Bous/Saar, Lebach, Schmelz, and Wadgassen Ämter)
1972	246	Saarlouis	Merzig-Wadern district; Saarlouis district (excluding Schwalbach municipality and Bous/Saar, Lebach, Schmelz, and Wadgassen Ämter)
1976	246	Saarlouis	Merzig-Wadern district; Saarlouis district (excluding Bous, Ensdorf, Lebach, Schmelz, Schwalbach, and Wadgassen municipalities)
1980	246	Saarlouis	Merzig-Wadern district; Saarlouis district (excluding Bous, Ensdorf, Lebach, Schmelz, Schwalbach, and Wadgassen municipalities)
1983	246	Saarlouis	Merzig-Wadern district; Saarlouis district (excluding Bous, Ensdorf, Lebach, Schmelz, Schwalbach, and Wadgassen municipalities)
1987	246	Saarlouis	Merzig-Wadern district; Saarlouis district (excluding Bous, Ensdorf, Lebach, Schmelz, Schwalbach, and Wadgassen municipalities)
1990	246	Saarlouis	Merzig-Wadern district; Saarlouis district (excluding Bous, Ensdorf, Lebach, Schmelz, Schwalbach, and Wadgassen municipalities)
1994	246	Saarlouis	Merzig-Wadern district; Saarlouis district (excluding Bous, Ensdorf, Lebach, Schmelz, Schwalbach, and Wadgassen municipalities)
1998	246	Saarlouis	Merzig-Wadern district; Saarlouis district (excluding Bous, Ensdorf, Lebach, Schmelz, Schwalbach, and Wadgassen municipalities)
2002	297	Saarlouis	Merzig-Wadern district; Saarlouis district (excluding Lebach and Schmelz municipalities)
2005	297	Saarlouis	Merzig-Wadern district; Saarlouis district (excluding Lebach and Schmelz municipalities)
2009	297	Saarlouis	Merzig-Wadern district; Saarlouis district (excluding Lebach and Schmelz municipalities)
2013	297	Saarlouis	Merzig-Wadern district; Saarlouis district (excluding Lebach and Schmelz municipalities)
2017	297	Saarlouis	Merzig-Wadern district; Saarlouis district (excluding Lebach and Schmelz municipalities)
2021	297	Saarlouis	Merzig-Wadern district; Saarlouis district (excluding Lebach and Schmelz municipalities)
2025	297	Saarlouis	Merzig-Wadern district; Saarlouis district (excluding Lebach and Schmelz municipalities)

== Members ==
The constituency was first represented by Albert Baldauf of the Christian Democratic Union (CDU) from 1957 to 1965, followed by fellow CDU member Josef Schmitt from 1965 to 1976. Hans-Werner Müller of the CDU was then representative from 1976 to 1990. Ottmar Schreiner of the Social Democratic Party (SPD) was elected in 1990 and served until 2009. Peter Altmaier of the CDU was representative from 2009 to 2021. Heiko Maas won the constituency for the SPD in 2021.

Election	Member	Party	%
1957	Albert Baldauf	CDU	44.4
1961	Albert Baldauf	CDU	58.2
1965	Josef Schmitt	CDU	54.2
1969	Josef Schmitt	CDU	53.4
1972	Josef Schmitt	CDU	48.6
1976	Hans-Werner Müller	CDU	50.4
1980	Hans-Werner Müller	CDU	47.5
1983	Hans-Werner Müller	CDU	51.2
1987	Hans-Werner Müller	CDU	45.6
1990	Ottmar Schreiner	SPD	50.0
1994	Ottmar Schreiner	SPD	49.0
1998	Ottmar Schreiner	SPD	55.1
2002	Ottmar Schreiner	SPD	50.6
2005	Ottmar Schreiner	SPD	40.4
2009	Peter Altmaier	CDU	37.5
2013	Peter Altmaier	CDU	44.5
2017	Peter Altmaier	CDU	38.0
2021	Heiko Maas	SPD	36.7
2025	Philip Hoffmann	CDU	31.8

== Election results ==
=== 2025 election ===
Federal election (2025): Saarlouis
Notes:	Blue background denotes the winner of the electorate vote. Pink background denotes a candidate elected from their party list. Yellow background denotes an electorate win by a list member, or other incumbent. A ✓ or ✗ denotes status of any incumbent, win or lose respectively.						
Party	Candidate	Votes	%	±%	Party votes	%	±%
CDU	Philip Hoffmann	51,702	31.8	▲3.9	46,087	28.3	▲3.9
SPD	David Maaß	46,006	28.3	▼8.4	34,687	21.3	▼15.2
AfD	Carsten Becker	35,619	21.9	▲12.3	35,420	21.7	▲11.7
BSW					11,041	6.8	New
Left	Peter Michely	10,902	6.7	▲1.3	11,036	6.8	0.0
Greens	Volker Morbe	7,726	4.8	0.0	10,185	6.2	New
FDP	Gudrun Bierbrauer-Haupenthal	5,260	3.2	▼4.9	7,259	4.4	▼7.6
Tierschutzpartei					3,333	2.0	▼0.9
FW	Klaus Hoffmann	5,170	3.2	▲0.4	2,170	1.3	▼0.8
Volt					1,000	0.6	0.0
Pirates					469	0.3	▼0.3
BD					384	0.2	New
MLPD					55	<0.1	0.0
Informal votes		2,378			1,637		
Total valid votes		162,385			163,126		
Turnout		164,763	83.1	▲4.8			
CDU gain from SPD	Majority	5,696	3.5	N/A			

=== 2021 election ===
Federal election (2021): Saarlouis
Notes:	Blue background denotes the winner of the electorate vote. Pink background denotes a candidate elected from their party list. Yellow background denotes an electorate win by a list member, or other incumbent. A ✓ or ✗ denotes status of any incumbent, win or lose respectively.						
Party	Candidate	Votes	%	±%	Party votes	%	±%
SPD	Heiko Maas	57,354	36.7	▲4.7	56,920	36.4	▲9.5
CDU	✗ Peter Altmaier	43,671	28.0	▼10.1	38,085	24.4	▼9.2
AfD	Carsten Becker	15,111	9.7	▲0.7	15,651	10.0	▲0.2
FDP	Angelika Hießerich-Peter	12,777	8.2	▲4.3	18,872	12.1	▲4.4
Left	Dagmar Ensch-Engel	8,405	5.4	▼5.5	10,512	6.7	▼6.2
Greens	Ute Lessel	7,383	4.7	▲1.2	–	–	▼5.5
Tierschutzpartei					4,535	2.9	–
FW	Klaus Hoffmann	4,352	2.8	▲1.9	3,315	2.1	▲1.3
PARTEI	Sam Schröder	3,853	2.5	▲1.4	2,736	1.8	▲0.6
dieBasis	Marc Ensch	2,466	1.6	–	2,221	1.4	–
Volt					954	0.6	–
Pirates					860	0.6	0.0
Team Todenhöfer					599	0.4	–
ÖDP	Philipp-Noah Groß	751	0.5	–	593	0.4	–
NPD					350	0.2	▼0.3
MLPD					76	0.0	0.0
Informal votes		3,047			2,891		
Total valid votes		156,123			156,279		
Turnout		159,170	78.3	▲1.0			
SPD gain from CDU	Majority	13,683	8.7	▲14.6			

=== 2017 election ===
Federal election (2017): Saarlouis
Notes:	Blue background denotes the winner of the electorate vote. Pink background denotes a candidate elected from their party list. Yellow background denotes an electorate win by a list member, or other incumbent. A ✓ or ✗ denotes status of any incumbent, win or lose respectively.						
Party	Candidate	Votes	%	±%	Party votes	%	±%
CDU	✓ Peter Altmaier	60,102	38.0	▼6.4	52,981	33.6	▼6.4
SPD	Heiko Maas	50,672	32.1	▼3.8	42,476	27.0	▼3.8
Left	Marilyn Heib	17,142	10.8	▲3.6	20,320	12.9	▲3.9
AfD	Irene Lienshöft	14,224	9.0	▲4.7	15,506	9.8	▲4.7
FDP	Kirsten Cortez de Lobao	6,069	3.8	▲2.6	12,059	7.7	▲4.0
Greens	Markus Tressel	5,532	3.5	▼0.2	8,598	5.5	▲0.2
PARTEI	Michael Kiefer	1,741	1.1		1,751	1.1	
FW	Uwe Andreas Kammer	1,352	0.9		1,243	0.8	▲0.1
Pirates	Lea Magdalena Laux	939	0.6	▼1.8	799	0.5	▼2.0
NPD					748	0.5	▼1.3
V-Partei³					461	0.3	
PDV	Michael Bienek	242	0.2		201	0.1	
BGE					197	0.1	
DM					185	0.2	
MLPD					80	0.1	0.0
Informal votes		2,415			2,825		
Total valid votes		158,015			157,605		
Turnout		160,430	77.3	▲4.4			
CDU hold	Majority	9,430	5.9	▼3.7			

=== 2013 election ===
Federal election (2013): Saarlouis
Notes:	Blue background denotes the winner of the electorate vote. Pink background denotes a candidate elected from their party list. Yellow background denotes an electorate win by a list member, or other incumbent. A ✓ or ✗ denotes status of any incumbent, win or lose respectively.						
Party	Candidate	Votes	%	±%	Party votes	%	±%
CDU	✓ Peter Altmaier	66,694	44.5	▲7.0	60,052	40.1	▲7.7
SPD	Reinhold Jost	52,303	34.9	▲2.0	46,037	30.7	▲6.5
Left	Wolfgang Schumacher	10,936	7.3	▼8.3	13,458	9.0	▼10.9
AfD	Heinrich Adams	6,418	4.3		7,645	5.1	
Greens	Markus Tressel	5,577	3.7	▼1.6	7,873	5.3	▼1.3
Pirates	Michael Klein	3,652	2.4		3,739	2.5	▲1.1
NPD	Frank Franz	2,475	1.7	▲0.3	2,610	1.7	▲0.5
FDP	Wolfgang Krichel	1,872	1.2	▼6.2	5,480	3.7	▼8.9
FAMILIE					1,653	1.1	▼0.2
FW					1,075	0.7	
PRO					237	0.2	
MLPD					71	0.0	0.0
Informal votes		4,360			4,357		
Total valid votes		149,927			149,930		
Turnout		154,287	72.9	▼1.3			
CDU hold	Majority	14,391	9.6	▲5.0			

=== 2009 election ===
Federal election (2009): Saarlouis
Notes:	Blue background denotes the winner of the electorate vote. Pink background denotes a candidate elected from their party list. Yellow background denotes an electorate win by a list member, or other incumbent. A ✓ or ✗ denotes status of any incumbent, win or lose respectively.						
Party	Candidate	Votes	%	±%	Party votes	%	±%
CDU	Peter Altmaier	58,297	37.5	▲1.5	50,566	32.4	▲0.5
SPD	✗ Ottmar Schreiner	51,193	32.9	▼7.5	37,749	24.2	▼9.0
Left	Alfred Pfannebecker	24,244	15.6	▲1.9	31,057	19.9	▲2.0
FDP	Sebastian Greiber	11,516	7.4	▲3.9	19,643	12.6	▲5.0
Greens	Claudia Beck	8,342	5.4	▲2.4	10,194	6.5	▲1.2
Pirates					2,188	1.4	
FAMILIE					2,013	1.3	▼0.4
NPD	Aloys Lehmler	2,025	1.3	▼0.4	1,874	1.2	▼0.5
RRP					861	0.6	
MLPD					48	0.0	▼0.1
Informal votes		4,022			3,446		
Total valid votes		155,617			156,193		
Turnout		159,639	74.3	▼5.6			
CDU gain from SPD	Majority	7,104	4.6				

=== 2005 election ===
Federal election (2005):Saarlouis
Notes:	Blue background denotes the winner of the electorate vote. Pink background denotes a candidate elected from their party list. Yellow background denotes an electorate win by a list member, or other incumbent. A ✓ or ✗ denotes status of any incumbent, win or lose respectively.						
Party	Candidate	Votes	%	±%	Party votes	%	±%
SPD	✓ Ottmar Schreiner	67,981	40.4	▼10.2	55,839	33.1	▼12.4
CDU	Peter Altmaier	60,495	35.9	▼3.3	53,774	31.9	▼4.5
Left	Norbert Mannschatz	22,956	13.6	▲1.5	30,142	17.9	▲16.7
FDP	Christian Holbach	5,867	3.5	▼1.0	12,789	7.6	▲0.9
Greens	Klaus Borger	4,915	2.9	▼0.5	9,014	5.4	▼1.6
Familie	Franz-Rudolf Hermann	3,321	2.0		2,874	1.7	▲0.9
NPD	Markus Mang	2,802	1.7	▲0.5	2,872	1.7	▲1.0
GRAUEN					995	0.6	▲0.1
MLPD					183	0.1	
Informal votes		4,695			4,550		
Total valid votes		168,337			168,482		
Turnout		173,032	79.9	▼0.7			
SPD hold	Majority	7,486	4.5				
