= St. Wendel (electoral district) =

Federal electoral district of Germany

298 St. Wendel
- Electoral district for the Bundestag
- St. Wendel in 2025
- State: Saarland
- Population: 212,600 (2019)
- Electorate: 173,074 (2021)
- Major settlements: Sankt Wendel; Lebach; Ottweiler
- Area: 802.0 km^{2}

Current electoral district
- Created: 1957
- Party: CDU
- Member: Roland Theis
- Elected: 2025

St. Wendel is an electoral constituency (German: Wahlkreis) represented in the Bundestag. It elects one member via first-past-the-post voting. Under the current constituency numbering system, it is designated as constituency 298. It is located in northeastern Saarland, comprising the Sankt Wendel district, the northern part of the Neunkirchen district, and parts of the Saarlouis and Saarbrücken districts.

St. Wendel was created for the inaugural 1957 federal election after the accession of Saarland to Germany. From 2021 to 2025, it was represented by Christian Petry of the Social Democratic Party (SPD). Since 2025 it has been represented by Roland Theis of the CDU.

== Geography ==
St. Wendel is located in northeastern Saarland. As of the 2021 federal election, it comprises the Sankt Wendel district, the Neunkirchen district excluding the Neunkirchen and Spiesen-Elversberg municipalities, the Lebach and Schmelz municipalities from the Saarlouis district, and the Heusweiler municipality from the Saarbrücken district.

== History ==
St. Wendel was created in 1957, then known as Ottweiler – St. Wendel. In the 1965 through 1972 elections, it was named Ottweiler. It acquired its current name in the 1976 election. In the 1957 and 1961 elections, it was constituency 246 in the numbering system. In the 1965 through 1998 elections, it was number 247. Since the 2002 election, it has been number 298.

Originally, the constituency comprised the district of Sankt Wendel, the municipalities of Eppelborn, Illingen, Merchweiler, Ottweiler, and Schiffweiler from the Ottweiler district, and the Ämter of Lebach and Schmelz from the Saarlouis district. In the 1976 election, it acquired a configuration very similar to its current borders, but excluding the municipality of Heusweiler from the Saarbrücken district. It acquired its current borders in the 2002 election.

| Election | No. | Name | Borders |
|---|---|---|---|
| 1957 | 246 | Ottweiler – St. Wendel | Sankt Wendel district; Ottweiler district (only Eppelborn, Illingen, Merchweiler, Ottweiler, and Schiffweiler municipalities); Saarlouis district (only Lebach and Schmelz Ämter) |
| 1961 | 246 | Ottweiler – St. Wendel | Sankt Wendel district; Ottweiler district (only Eppelborn, Illingen, Merchweiler, Ottweiler, and Schiffweiler municipalities); Saarlouis district (only Lebach and Schmelz Ämter) |
| 1965 | 247 | Ottweiler | Sankt Wendel district; Ottweiler district (only Eppelborn, Illingen, Merchweiler, Ottweiler, and Schiffweiler municipalities); Saarlouis district (only Lebach and Schmelz Ämter) |
| 1969 | 247 | Ottweiler | Sankt Wendel district; Ottweiler district (only Eppelborn, Illingen, Merchweiler, Ottweiler, and Schiffweiler municipalities); Saarlouis district (only Lebach and Schmelz Ämter) |
| 1972 | 247 | Ottweiler | Sankt Wendel district; Ottweiler district (only Eppelborn, Illingen, Merchweiler, Ottweiler, and Schiffweiler municipalities); Saarlouis district (only Lebach and Schmelz Ämter) |
| 1976 | 247 | St. Wendel | Sankt Wendel district; Neunkirchen district (excluding Neunkirchen and Spiesen-Elversberg municipalities); Saarlouis district (only Lebach and Schmelz municipalities) |
| 1980 | 247 | St. Wendel | Sankt Wendel district; Neunkirchen district (excluding Neunkirchen and Spiesen-Elversberg municipalities); Saarlouis district (only Lebach and Schmelz municipalities) |
| 1983 | 247 | St. Wendel | Sankt Wendel district; Neunkirchen district (excluding Neunkirchen and Spiesen-Elversberg municipalities); Saarlouis district (only Lebach and Schmelz municipalities) |
| 1987 | 247 | St. Wendel | Sankt Wendel district; Neunkirchen district (excluding Neunkirchen and Spiesen-Elversberg municipalities); Saarlouis district (only Lebach and Schmelz municipalities) |
| 1990 | 247 | St. Wendel | Sankt Wendel district; Neunkirchen district (excluding Neunkirchen and Spiesen-Elversberg municipalities); Saarlouis district (only Lebach and Schmelz municipalities) |
| 1994 | 247 | St. Wendel | Sankt Wendel district; Neunkirchen district (excluding Neunkirchen and Spiesen-Elversberg municipalities); Saarlouis district (only Lebach and Schmelz municipalities) |
| 1998 | 247 | St. Wendel | Sankt Wendel district; Neunkirchen district (excluding Neunkirchen and Spiesen-Elversberg municipalities); Saarlouis district (only Lebach and Schmelz municipalities) |
| 2002 | 298 | St. Wendel | Sankt Wendel district; Neunkirchen district (excluding Neunkirchen and Spiesen-Elversberg municipalities); Saarlouis district (only Lebach and Schmelz municipalities); Saarbrücken district (only Heusweiler municipality) |
| 2005 | 298 | St. Wendel | Sankt Wendel district; Neunkirchen district (excluding Neunkirchen and Spiesen-Elversberg municipalities); Saarlouis district (only Lebach and Schmelz municipalities); Saarbrücken district (only Heusweiler municipality) |
| 2009 | 298 | St. Wendel | Sankt Wendel district; Neunkirchen district (excluding Neunkirchen and Spiesen-Elversberg municipalities); Saarlouis district (only Lebach and Schmelz municipalities); Saarbrücken district (only Heusweiler municipality) |
| 2013 | 298 | St. Wendel | Sankt Wendel district; Neunkirchen district (excluding Neunkirchen and Spiesen-Elversberg municipalities); Saarlouis district (only Lebach and Schmelz municipalities); Saarbrücken district (only Heusweiler municipality) |
| 2017 | 298 | St. Wendel | Sankt Wendel district; Neunkirchen district (excluding Neunkirchen and Spiesen-Elversberg municipalities); Saarlouis district (only Lebach and Schmelz municipalities); Saarbrücken district (only Heusweiler municipality) |
| 2021 | 298 | St. Wendel | Sankt Wendel district; Neunkirchen district (excluding Neunkirchen and Spiesen-Elversberg municipalities); Saarlouis district (only Lebach and Schmelz municipalities); Saarbrücken district (only Heusweiler municipality) |
| 2025 | 298 | St. Wendel | Sankt Wendel district; Neunkirchen district (excluding Neunkirchen and Spiesen-Elversberg municipalities); Saarlouis district (only Lebach and Schmelz municipalities); Saarbrücken district (only Heusweiler municipality) |

== Members ==
The constituency was first represented by Leo Gottesleben of the Christian Democratic Union (CDU) from 1957 to 1972, followed by fellow CDU member Werner Zeyer from 1972 to 1980. Johannes Ganz of the CDU was then representative from 1980 to 1990. Hans-Georg Wagner of the Social Democratic Party (SPD) was elected in 1990 and served until 2005. He was succeeded by fellow SPD member Rainer Tabillion for one term. Nadine Schön of the CDU was representative from 2009 to 2021. Christian Petry won the constituency for the SPD in 2021.

| Election | Member | Party | % |
|---|---|---|---|
| 1957 | Leo Gottesleben | CDU | 39.6 |
| 1961 | Leo Gottesleben | CDU | 55.7 |
| 1965 | Leo Gottesleben | CDU | 54.0 |
| 1969 | Leo Gottesleben | CDU | 51.7 |
| 1972 | Werner Zeyer | CDU | 48.2 |
| 1976 | Werner Zeyer | CDU | 50.9 |
| 1980 | Johannes Ganz | CDU | 47.9 |
| 1983 | Johannes Ganz | CDU | 51.5 |
| 1987 | Johannes Ganz | CDU | 48.1 |
| 1990 | Hans-Georg Wagner | SPD | 48.7 |
| 1994 | Hans-Georg Wagner | SPD | 51.1 |
| 1998 | Hans-Georg Wagner | SPD | 53.1 |
| 2002 | Hans-Georg Wagner | SPD | 47.9 |
| 2005 | Rainer Tabillion | SPD | 37.8 |
| 2009 | Nadine Schön | CDU | 40.1 |
| 2013 | Nadine Schön | CDU | 45.4 |
| 2017 | Nadine Schön | CDU | 41.8 |
| 2021 | Christian Petry | SPD | 35.1 |
| 2025 | Roland Theis | CDU | 33.9 |

== Election results ==
=== 2025 election ===
Federal election (2025): St. Wendel
| Notes: | Blue background denotes the winner of the electorate vote. Pink background denotes a candidate elected from their party list. Yellow background denotes an electorate win by a list member, or other incumbent. A ✓ or ✗ denotes status of any incumbent, win or lose respectively. | | | | | | |
| Party | Candidate | Votes | % | ±% | Party votes | % | ±% |
|---|---|---|---|---|---|---|---|
| CDU | Roland Theis | 47,870 | 33.9 | ▲1.8 | 42,958 | 30.3 | ▲3.9 |
| SPD | ✗ Christian Petry | 40,409 | 28.6 | ▼6.5 | 31,470 | 22.2 | ▼15.2 |
| AfD | Rüdiger Klesmann | 29,033 | 20.5 | ▲11.5 | 29,390 | 20.7 | ▲11.3 |
| Left | Karl-Peter Scheit | 8,133 | 5.8 | ▲1.5 | 8,583 | 6.1 | ▲0.3 |
| BSW | | | | | 8,118 | 5.7 | New |
| FDP | Oliver Luksic | 5,363 | 3.8 | ▼4.5 | 5,753 | 4.1 | ▼6.8 |
| Greens | Julian Bonenberger | 5,341 | 3.8 | ▼0.4 | 8,744 | 6.2 | New |
| Tierschutzpartei | | | | | 2,892 | 2.0 | ▼0.7 |
| FW | Michael Schmitt | 5,160 | 3.7 | ▲1.1 | 2,322 | 1.6 | ▼0.5 |
| Volt | | | | | 688 | 0.5 | 0.0 |
| Pirates | | | | | 409 | 0.3 | ▼0.3 |
| BD | | | | | 363 | 0.3 | New |
| MLPD | | | | | 47 | <0.1 | 0.0 |
| Informal votes | | 1,871 | | | 1,443 | | |
| Total valid votes | | 141,309 | | | 141,737 | | |
| Turnout | | 143,180 | 85.2 | ▲4.4 | | | |
| CDU gain from SPD | Majority | 7,461 | 5.3 | N/A | | | |

=== 2021 election ===
Federal election (2021): St. Wendel
| Notes: | Blue background denotes the winner of the electorate vote. Pink background denotes a candidate elected from their party list. Yellow background denotes an electorate win by a list member, or other incumbent. A ✓ or ✗ denotes status of any incumbent, win or lose respectively. | | | | | | |
| Party | Candidate | Votes | % | ±% | Party votes | % | ±% |
|---|---|---|---|---|---|---|---|
| SPD | Christian Petry | 48,135 | 35.1 | ▲4.8 | 51,229 | 37.4 | ▲9.7 |
| CDU | ✗ Nadine Schön (Note: Schön entered the Bundestag on the CDU list after Annegret Kramp-Karrenbauer declined her mandate.) | 43,298 | 32.1 | ▼9.7 | 36,248 | 26.5 | ▼10.1 |
| AfD | Axel Magar | 12,346 | 9.0 | ▲0.6 | 12,904 | 9.4 | ▲0.3 |
| FDP | Oliver Luksic | 11,354 | 8.3 | ▲3.6 | 14,916 | 10.9 | ▲4.0 |
| Left | Rosa Maria Grewenig | 5,783 | 4.2 | ▼5.6 | 7,887 | 5.8 | ▼5.6 |
| Green | Uta Sullenberger | 5,739 | 4.2 | ▲0.8 | | | |
| Tierschutzpartei | | | | | 3,808 | 2.8 | |
| FW | Clemens Werle | 3,562 | 2.6 | ▲1.0 | 2,881 | 2.1 | ▲1.2 |
| PARTEI | Denis Schröder | 3,261 | 2.4 | | 2,276 | 1.7 | ▲0.5 |
| dieBasis | Hans-Theo Both | 2,251 | 1.6 | | 2,094 | 1.5 | |
| Pirates | | | | | 741 | 0.5 | ▲0.1 |
| Volt | | | | | 693 | 0.5 | |
| ÖDP | Andrea Honecker | 621 | 0.5 | | 595 | 0.4 | |
| Team Todenhöfer | | | | | 408 | 0.3 | |
| NPD | | | | | 293 | 0.2 | ▲0.3 |
| MLPD | | | | | 59 | 0.0 | 0.0 |
| Informal votes | | 2,828 | | | 2,776 | | |
| Total valid votes | | 136,980 | | | 137,032 | | |
| Turnout | | 139,808 | 80.8 | ▲1.1 | | | |
| SPD gain from CDU | Majority | 4,207 | 3.0 | | | | |

=== 2017 election ===
Federal election (2017): St. Wendel
| Notes: | Blue background denotes the winner of the electorate vote. Pink background denotes a candidate elected from their party list. Yellow background denotes an electorate win by a list member, or other incumbent. A ✓ or ✗ denotes status of any incumbent, win or lose respectively. | | | | | | |
| Party | Candidate | Votes | % | ±% | Party votes | % | ±% |
|---|---|---|---|---|---|---|---|
| CDU | ✓ Nadine Schön | 57,987 | 41.8 | ▼3.6 | 50,660 | 36.5 | ▼4.4 |
| SPD | Christian Petry | 42,129 | 30.4 | ▼3.1 | 38,368 | 27.7 | ▼2.8 |
| Left | Karl-Peter Scheit | 13,584 | 9.8 | ▲2.1 | 15,686 | 11.3 | ▲2.3 |
| AfD | Rainer Schorn | 11,646 | 8.4 | ▲3.6 | 12,627 | 9.1 | ▲3.7 |
| FDP | Oliver Luksic | 6,517 | 4.7 | ▲3.0 | 9,569 | 6.9 | ▲3.5 |
| Greens | Sören Bund-Becker | 4,674 | 3.4 | ▲0.5 | 6,662 | 4.8 | ▲0.3 |
| PARTEI | | | | | 1,632 | 1.2 | |
| FW | Roman Maurer | 2,232 | 1.6 | | 1,261 | 0.9 | ▲0.3 |
| Pirates | | | | | 648 | 0.5 | ▼2.1 |
| NPD | | | | | 646 | 0.5 | ▼1.1 |
| V-Partei³ | | | | | 318 | 0.2 | |
| DM | | | | | 222 | 0.2 | |
| BGE | | | | | 202 | 0.1 | |
| PDV | | | | | 124 | 0.1 | |
| MLPD | | | | | 73 | 0.1 | 0.0 |
| Informal votes | | 2,618 | | | 2,689 | | |
| Total valid votes | | 138,769 | | | 138,698 | | |
| Turnout | | 141,387 | 79.7 | ▲3.6 | | | |
| CDU hold | Majority | 15,858 | 11.4 | ▼0.5 | | | |

=== 2013 election ===
Federal election (2013): St. Wendel
| Notes: | Blue background denotes the winner of the electorate vote. Pink background denotes a candidate elected from their party list. Yellow background denotes an electorate win by a list member, or other incumbent. A ✓ or ✗ denotes status of any incumbent, win or lose respectively. | | | | | | |
| Party | Candidate | Votes | % | ±% | Party votes | % | ±% |
|---|---|---|---|---|---|---|---|
| CDU | ✓ Nadine Schön | 60,865 | 45.4 | ▲5.3 | 54,911 | 40.9 | ▲6.3 |
| SPD | Christian Petry (Note: Petry entered the Bundestag on the SPD list after Reinhold Jost resigned from his seat in January 2014.) | 44,868 | 33.5 | ▲2.6 | 40,861 | 30.4 | ▲5.0 |
| Left | Dennis Bard | 10,247 | 7.6 | ▼8.9 | 12,139 | 9.0 | ▼10.1 |
| AfD | Johannes Trampert | 6,365 | 4.7 | | 7,287 | 5.4 | |
| Greens | Iris Langguth | 3,793 | 2.8 | ▼1.5 | 6,088 | 4.5 | ▼0.8 |
| Pirates | Gerd Rainer Weber | 3,035 | 2.3 | | 3,391 | 2.5 | ▲1.2 |
| FDP | Oliver Luksic | 2,221 | 1.7 | ▼5.2 | 4,514 | 3.4 | ▼7.4 |
| NPD | Peter Richter | 1,975 | 1.5 | ▲0.2 | 2,062 | 1.5 | ▲0.4 |
| FAMILIE | | | | | 1,858 | 1.4 | ▼0.2 |
| FW | | | | | 810 | 0.6 | |
| PDV | Axel Magar | 687 | 0.5 | | | | |
| PRO | | | | | 214 | 0.2 | |
| MLPD | | | | | 58 | 0.0 | 0.0 |
| Informal votes | | 4,041 | | | 3,904 | | |
| Total valid votes | | 134,056 | | | 134,193 | | |
| Turnout | | 138,097 | 76.1 | ▼1.2 | | | |
| CDU hold | Majority | 15,997 | 11.9 | ▲2.7 | | | |

=== 2009 election ===
Federal election (2009): St. Wendel
| Notes: | Blue background denotes the winner of the electorate vote. Pink background denotes a candidate elected from their party list. Yellow background denotes an electorate win by a list member, or other incumbent. A ✓ or ✗ denotes status of any incumbent, win or lose respectively. | | | | | | |
| Party | Candidate | Votes | % | ±% | Party votes | % | ±% |
|---|---|---|---|---|---|---|---|
| CDU | Nadine Müller | 55,727 | 40.1 | ▲2.9 | 48,373 | 34.6 | ▲1.1 |
| SPD | ✗ Rainer Tabillion | 42,910 | 30.9 | ▼6.9 | 35,506 | 25.4 | ▼8.1 |
| Left | Hans-Kurt Hill | 22,965 | 16.5 | ▲2.5 | 26,775 | 19.2 | ▲2.2 |
| FDP | Oliver Luksic | 9,486 | 6.8 | ▲3.1 | 15,094 | 10.8 | ▲4.0 |
| Greens | Iris Langguth | 6,058 | 4.4 | ▲1.6 | 7,507 | 5.4 | ▲0.7 |
| FAMILIE | | | | | 2,273 | 1.6 | ▼0.6 |
| Pirates | | | | | 1,853 | 1.3 | |
| NPD | Frank Franz | 1,835 | 1.3 | ▼0.4 | 1,629 | 1.2 | ▼0.5 |
| RRP | | | | | 664 | 0.5 | |
| MLPD | | | | | 42 | 0.0 | ▼0.1 |
| Informal votes | | 3,814 | | | 3,079 | | |
| Total valid votes | | 138,981 | | | 139,716 | | |
| Turnout | | 142,795 | 77.2 | ▼5.1 | | | |
| CDU gain from SPD | Majority | 12,817 | 9.2 | | | | |

=== 2005 election ===
Federal election (2005):St. Wendel
| Notes: | Blue background denotes the winner of the electorate vote. Pink background denotes a candidate elected from their party list. Yellow background denotes an electorate win by a list member, or other incumbent. A ✓ or ✗ denotes status of any incumbent, win or lose respectively. | | | | | | |
| Party | Candidate | Votes | % | ±% | Party votes | % | ±% |
|---|---|---|---|---|---|---|---|
| SPD | Rainer Tabillion | 56,256 | 37.8 | ▼10.1 | 50,048 | 33.5 | ▼12.3 |
| CDU | Hermann Scharf | 55,358 | 37.2 | ▼3.7 | 50,000 | 33.5 | ▼4.8 |
| Left | Heike Kugler | 20,838 | 14.0 | ▲13.1 | 25,286 | 16.9 | ▲15.8 |
| FDP | Dieter Heim | 5,482 | 3.7 | ▼0.1 | 10,127 | 6.8 | ▲1.2 |
| Familie | Wolfgang Britz | 4,300 | 2.9 | ▲0.9 | 3,307 | 2.2 | ▲1.0 |
| Greens | Kristin Günther | 4,085 | 2.7 | ▼0.4 | 6,925 | 4.6 | ▼1.0 |
| NPD | Aloys Lehmler | 2,498 | 1.7 | ▲0.7 | 2,502 | 1.7 | ▲1.1 |
| GRAUEN | | | | | 951 | 0.6 | ▲0.2 |
| MLPD | | | | | 140 | 0.1 | |
| Informal votes | | 5,179 | | | 4,710 | | |
| Total valid votes | | 148,817 | | | 149,286 | | |
| Turnout | | 153,996 | 82.3 | ▼0.5 | | | |
| SPD hold | Majority | 898 | 0.6 | | | | |
