= Philip Hoffmann (German politician) =

German politician (born 1988)

Member of the Bundestag
- Assuming office TBD
- Succeeding: Peter Altmaier
- Constituency: Saarlouis

Personal details
- Born: 21 November 1988 (age 37)
- Party: Christian Democratic Union

Philip M.A. Hoffmann (born 21 November 1988) is a German economist, winemaker and politician (CDU). He has been a member of the German Bundestag since the 2025 general election. He has also been an honorary citizen of the Belgian city of Bruges since 2015 and President of the "Saarländischer Winzerverband" since 2022. He speaks fluent French and English.

== Life ==
Hoffmann grew up on a farm in Biringen in the district of Saarlouis. After leaving school, he trained as a banker at Sparkasse Merzig-Wadern. He then studied economics and business administration at the University of Luxembourg, the Université de Lorraine, New York University, Saarland University and the College of Europe in Bruges. He graduated with a Master's degree in European Economic Studies, an M.Sc. in Banking and Finance, a Maîtrise in International Business and a Bachelor's degree in Business Administration. He was also a scholarship holder of the German Federal Ministry of Education and Research and the Luxembourg School of Finance Foundation.

After completing his studies, Hoffmann worked for the Union Investment Group in Luxembourg, where he spent almost 10 years as a Key Account Manager of the fund platform for international fund companies and was responsible for funds with a total volume in the double-digit billion range.

As an economic expert, he advised the Saarland state government on the Saarland 2030 strategy.

Hoffmann lives in Merzig, is married and has two children.

== Viticulture ==
In 2015, Hoffmann initiated the founding of the Pierre Marie wine atelier on his parents' farm, thereby establishing the first winery in the Saarlouis district. The organic winery specialises in new, fungus-resistant grape varieties. Since 2022, he has been president of the "Saarländischer Winzerverband", a member of the board of the "Deutscher Weinbauverband" and a deputy member of the board of the "Schutzgemeinschaft Mosel".

== Political career ==
Hoffmann joined the CDU in 2007 and became involved in the Young Union (JU). From 2016 to 2022, he was a member of the Federal Executive Board of JU Germany, where he headed the Federal Commission for Economy, Finance and Energy. He was also deputy state chairman of JU Saar and district chairman of JU Merzig-Wadern.

Hoffmann has been a member of the Saar CDU state executive since 2017 and deputy district chairman of the Merzig-Wadern CDU district association since 2022. He is also a member of Merzig city council.

Hoffmann stood as a direct candidate in the Saarlouis constituency in the 2025 German federal election and succeeded Peter Altmaier in the German Bundestag.

== Bundestag ==
Hoffmann was elected to the Bundestag as the directly elected representative for constituency 297 (Saarlouis). The constituency was previously represented by Heiko Maas and, in earlier legislative periods, by Peter Altmaier — both of whom served as federal ministers in the German government. In the Bundestag, Hoffmann is a member of the Finance Committee and the Committee on Economic Cooperation and Development, and serves as a permanent representative on the Budget Committee. In addition, he is the chairman of the Parliamentary Friendship Group for Belgium and Luxembourg in the German Bundestag.

== Political positions ==
During the COVID-19 pandemic, Hoffmann campaigned for the rights of cross-border workers and demanded that working from home should not have any tax disadvantages for employees residing in Germany and working abroad. This regulation was later implemented. Together with Marcus Hoffeld, he campaigned against the pandemic-related border closures between Germany, France and Luxembourg and worked to ensure that cross-border commuters had shorter waiting times at checkpoints.

To support cross-border cooperation, Hoffmann and a fellow campaigner organised a 200-kilometre protest walk along the Saarland border to send out a signal in support of the Schengen Agreement. The action was accompanied by German, French and Luxembourg politicians and was picked up by media such as Le Monde, RTL, ARD, ZDF and Luxemburger Wort.
