= Nadine Schön =

German politician (born 1983)

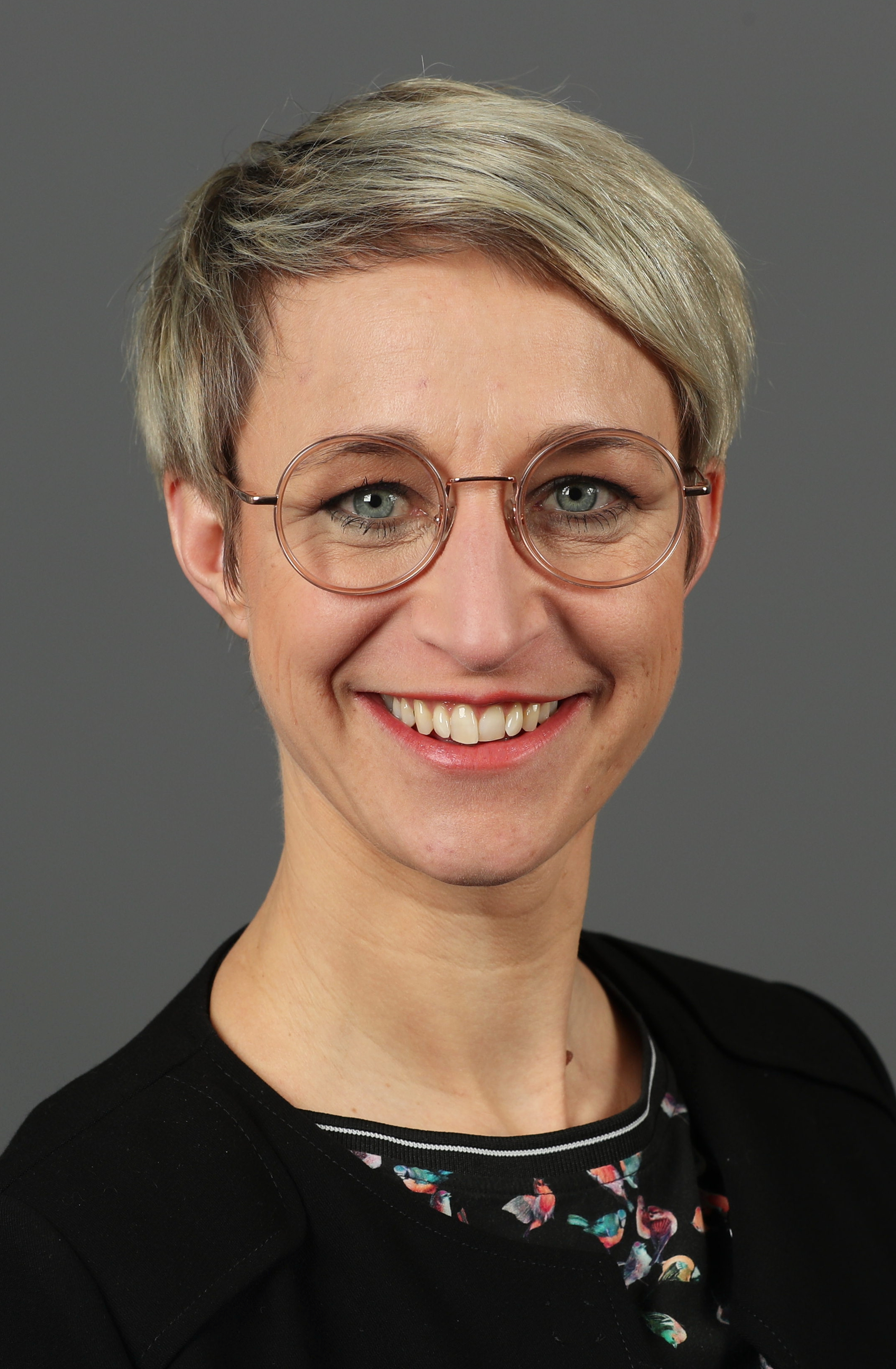
- Schön in 2020

Member of the Bundestag
- In office 27 October 2009 – 2025
- Preceded by: Rainer Tabillion
- Constituency: St. Wendel (2009–2021), Saarland list (2021–)

Member of the Landtag of Saarland
- In office 5 September 2004 – 10 November 2009
- Preceded by: Gaby Schäfer

Personal details
- Born: 5 June 1983 (age 43) Lebach, West Germany (now Germany)
- Citizenship: German
- Party: CDU
- Education: University of Heidelberg; Saarland University

Nadine Schön (born Nadine Müller, 5 June 1983 in Lebach, Saarland) is a German politician of the Christian Democratic Union (CDU) who served as a member of the German Parliament from 2009 to 2025, representing the constituency of St. Wendel.

== Political career ==
=== Career in state politics ===
Between 2004 and 2009, Schön served as a member of the Landtag of the Saarland, where she was the CDU parliamentary group's spokesperson on research and higher education.

=== Member of the German Parliament, 2009–2025 ===
Schön became a member of the German Bundestag in the 2009 federal elections. Between 2009 and 2013, she served on the Committee on Economic Affairs and Technology and the Committee on Family Affairs, Senior Citizens, Women and Youth. In this capacity, she was her parliamentary group's rapporteur on gender equality and the validation of foreign studies and degrees.

In the negotiations to form a Grand Coalition of Chancellor Angela Merkel's Christian Democrats (CDU together with the Bavarian CSU) and the Social Democrats (SPD) following the 2013 German elections, Schön was part of the CDU/CSU delegation in the working group on digital policy, led by Dorothee Bär and Brigitte Zypries. In 2014, she was appointed deputy chairperson of the CDU/CSU parliamentary group in charge of digital policy as well as family affairs, senior citizens, women and youth.

Following the 2017 elections, Schön succeeded Peter Altmaier as chair of the Bundestag group of CDU parliamentarians from Saarland. In the negotiations to form another coalition government under Merkel, she was again part of the working group on digital policy, this time led by Bär, Helge Braun and Lars Klingbeil.

Together with Roland Heintze, Daniel Günther, Andreas Jung, David McAllister, Antje Tillmann and Oliver Wittke, Schön co-chaired the CDU’s 2018 national convention in Hamburg.

After having initially failed to get re-elected in the 2021 German federal election, Schön retained her seat when Annegret Kramp-Karrenbauer resigned from the Bundestag two weeks after the election. Ahead of the Christian Democrats’ leadership election in 2022, Schön publicly endorsed Helge Braun to succeed Armin Laschet as the party’s chair and joined his campaign team.

Schön supported Markus Söder as the Christian Democrats' joint candidate to succeed Chancellor Angela Merkel in the 2021 national elections.

In July 2024, Schön announced that she would not stand in the 2025 federal elections but instead resign from active politics by the end of the parliamentary term.

== Later career ==
Following an appointment by Federal Minister for Education, Family Affairs, Senior Citizens, Women and Youth Karin Prien, Schön served as co-chair – alongside Olaf Köller – of the Commission on Child and Youth Protection in the Digital World from 2025 to 2026.

== Other activities ==
=== Regulatory agencies ===
- Federal Network Agency for Electricity, Gas, Telecommunications, Post and Railway (BNetzA), Member of the Advisory Board

=== Non-profit organizations ===
- Energy and Climate Policy and Innovation Council (EPICO), Member of the Advisory Board (since 2021)
- German Foundation for Active Citizenship and Volunteering (DSEE), Member of the Board of Trustees (since 2020)
- German Association for Public and Private Welfare, Member of the Central Committee (since 2017)
- German Foundation for World Population (DSW), Member of the Parliamentary Advisory Board (–2021)
- Stefan Morsch Foundation, Member of the Board of Trustees
- Europäische Akademie für Frauen in Politik und Wirtschaft Berlin, Member of the Board of Trustees

== Political positions ==
In June 2017, Schön voted against her parliamentary group's majority and in favor of Germany's introduction of same-sex marriage.

In April 2020, Schön co-signed – alongside around 50 other members of her parliamentary group – a letter to President of the European Commission Ursula von der Leyen which called on the European Union to take in children who were living in migrant camps across Greece.
