= David Maaß =

German politician (born 1984)

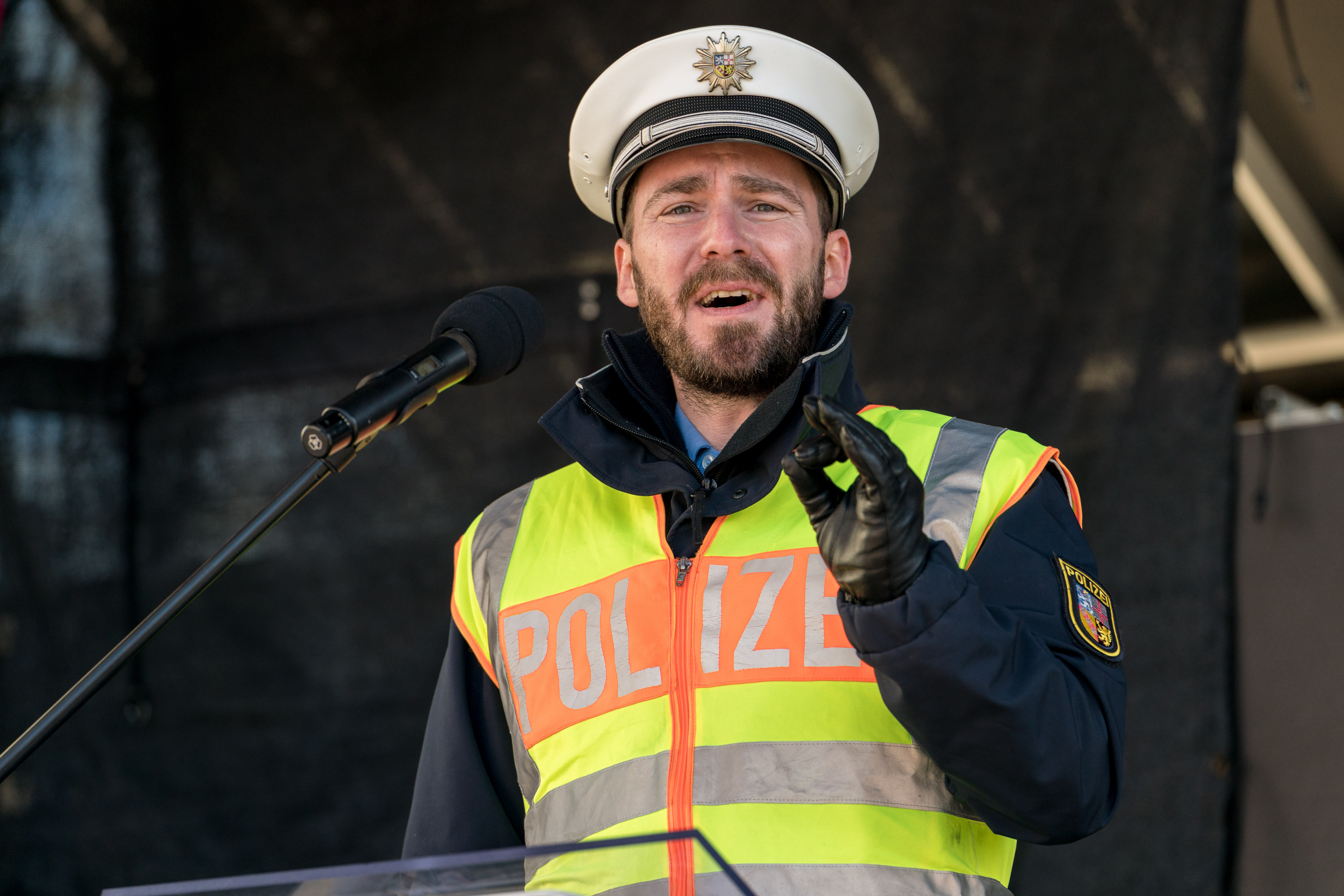
- David Maaß in 2021 in Saarbrücken

Member of the Landtag of Saarland
- Incumbent
- Assumed office 2022

Personal details
- Born: 31 December 1984 (age 41)
- Party: SPD
- Education: Saarbrücken University; University of Mainz

David Joachim Wilfried Maaß (born 31 December 1984) is a German politician of the Social Democratic Party (SPD). Since 2022, he has been a member of the Landtag of Saarland.

== Life ==
Maaß graduated from the Gymnasium am Stadtgarten in Saarlouis in 2004 and subsequently performed community service at St. Michael's Hospital in Völklingen. He then studied law at the universities of Saarbrücken and Mainz, specializing in criminal justice and criminology. After passing his first state law examination (Diplom-Jurist), he embarked on a career in the police force in 2010. From 2018 to 2023, Maaß was the Saarland state chairman of the Gewerkschaft der Polizei Police Union. He resigned from the chairmanship due to his candidacy for mayor.

== Political career ==
Maaß is the chairman of the SPD municipal association in Schwalbach. In the 2022 Saarland state election, he was elected to the Landtag of Saarland via his party's state list. He is the spokesperson for sports policy and the fight against right-wing extremism. On 5 June 2023, he was nominated by the SPD as a candidate for the mayoral election in Schwalbach. He lost the runoff election with 42.7% of the votes cast to Markus Weber, an independent and CDU-supported candidate who received 57.3%.

In the 2025 German federal election, he was direct candidate in Saarlouis and came second. He was not elected on the state list.
