= Carsten Becker =

German politician (born 1990)

Member of the German Bundestag
- Incumbent
- Assumed office 2025

Member of the Landtag of Saarland
- In office 2022–2025

Personal details
- Born: 20 January 1990 (age 36)
- Party: Alternative for Germany

Carsten Becker (born 20 January 1990 in Saarlouis) is a German politician from Alternative for Germany. He has been a member of the Landtag of Saarland since 2022, and in October of the same year he also became state chairman of his party in Saarland.

== Life ==
Becker is an electronics technician for industrial engineering. He has been a member of the AfD since 2013. After his training at the Ford plant in Saarlouis, he also worked in production for many years. He is the district chairman of his party in the Saarlouis district. Since 2014 he has been a member of the Saarlouis city council and a member of the district council of the Saarlouis district. In the 2021 German federal election, he ran for office in the Saarlouis constituency, but failed to enter the Bundestag. In the 2022 Saarland state election, he was elected to the Landtag of Saarland via a mandate in the Saarlouis constituency. In October 2022, Becker was elected state chairman of the AfD Saarland.

In the 2025 German federal election, Becker was the AfD's top candidate in Saarland. As the top candidate on the state list he was elected to the 21st Bundestag.
