= Hans-Georg Wagner =

German politician (1938–2025)

Member of the Bundestag
- In office 20 December 1990 – 18 October 2005

Member of the Landtag of Saarland for Neunkirchen
- In office 14 July 1975 – 31 January 1991

Personal details
- Born: 26 November 1938; Sankt Wendel, Gau Saar-Palatinate, Germany
- Died: 15 May 2025 (aged 86)
- Political party: SPD
- Education: Koblenz University of Applied Sciences
- Occupation: Engineer

Hans-Georg Wagner (26 November 1938 – 15 May 2025) was a German politician who was a member of the Social Democratic Party. He served in the Landtag of Saarland from 1975 to 1991 and in the Bundestag from 1990 to 2005.

Wagner died on 15 May 2025, at the age of 86.
