= Roland Theis =

German politician (born 1980)

Member of the Bundestag
- Incumbent
- Assumed office 2025

Personal details
- Born: 17 March 1980 Neunkirchen, West Germany (now Germany)
- Party: CDU

Roland Theis (born 17 March 1980) is a German politician of the Christian Democratic Union who has been serving as a member of the Bundestag since the 2025 elections, representing the St. Wendel district.

From 2017 to 2022, Theis served as State Secretary in the State Ministry of Justice in Saarland, in the government of Minister-President Tobias Hans.

== Education and early career ==
After his studies in the field of law and politics in the University of Saarland and the Université d'Aix-Marseille III he gained his first law degree in 2005 and second in 2008. He is a scholarship holder from the Konrad Adenauer Foundation and is currently working as a lecturer of constitutional and media law in the University of Saarland. Theis is the alumnus of the Marshall Memorial Fellowship of the German Marshall Fund and the American Jewish Committee.

Following his studies, Theis worked as a lawyer at SaarLB.

== Political career ==
=== Early beginnings ===
Theis was the chairman of the Junge Union in Saarland from 2005–2010 and is still the vice chairman of the International Commission of the Junge Union in Germany.

Theis was a member of the city council of Ottweiler and the district council of Neunkirchen from 2004 until 2009. In his home town Ottweiler he is the chairman of the local CDU association.

=== Career in state politics ===
In the 2009 state elections, Theis ran for Landtag as a member of CDU and was elected as a representative. He was elected as Secretary General of the CDU in Saarland in November 2010, after the board had appointed him to the position already in November 2009; in this capacity, he assisted chairwoman Annegret Kramp-Karrenbauer. In parliament, he was his parliamentary group's spokesman in issues concerning judicial, media and economic policy. In addition he is also the chairman of the committee of inquiry for Landtags elections of 2009.

After the CDU's lost its majority in the 2022 state elections, Theis was considered as contender to succeed Tobias Hans as the party's leader in Saarland but later withdrew from consideration.

=== Member of the German Parliament, 2025–present ===
In parliament, Theis has been serving on the Defence Committee, the Committee on European Affairs and the Subcommittee on the United Nations.

In addition to his committee assignments, Theis has been the chair of the German-French Parliamentary Friendship Group and a member of the German delegation to the Franco-German Parliamentary Assembly.

== Other activities ==
- Institute for Foreign Cultural Relations (IFA), Member of the General Meeting (since 2025)
