= Rehlingen-Siersburg =

- Municipality
- Coat of arms

- Location of Rehlingen-Siersburg within Saarlouis district
- Interactive map of Rehlingen-Siersburg
- Location within Germany Location within Saarland
- Coordinates: 49°22′7″N 6°40′43″E
- Country: Germany
- State: Saarland
- District: Saarlouis
- Subdivisions: 10

Government
  - Mayor (2021–31): Joshua Pawlak (SPD)

Area
  - Total: 61.25 km^{2} (23.65 sq mi)
- Elevation: 193 m (633 ft)

Population (2025-12-31)
  - Total: 14,889
  - Density: 243.1/km^{2} (629.6/sq mi)
- Time zone: UTC+01:00 (CET)
  - Summer (DST): UTC+02:00 (CEST)
- Postal codes: 66780
- Dialling codes: 06835, 06869, 06833, 06861
- Vehicle registration: SLS
- Website: www.rehlingen-siersburg.de

Rehlingen-Siersburg (German pronunciation: [ˈʁeːlɪŋən ˈziːɐ̯sbʊʁk]) is a municipality in the district of Saarlouis, in Saarland, Germany. It is situated on the river Saar, approximately 8 km (5.0 mi) northwest of Saarlouis, and 30 km (19 mi) northwest of Saarbrücken.

== Geography ==
=== Location ===
Rehlingen is located at the Saar, Siersburg is located at the Nied, the other districts are partly on the Gau (Saargau), partly in the valley of the Nied, a left-side tributary of the Saar. Rehlingen-Siersburg borders France to the west, Merzig-Wadern district to the north, Dillingen / Saar to the east, and Wallerfangen to the south.

=== Municipal districts ===
- Biringen
- Eimersdorf
- Fremersdorf
- Fürweiler
- Gerlfangen
- Hemmersdorf
- Niedaltdorf
- Oberesch
- Rehlingen Siersburg

== Sights ==
- Castle Fremersdorf
- Castle Siersburg
- Niedaltdorf stalactite cave
- Lorraine houses and castles in different districts
- Niedtal
- Saargau
- Druids path
