= Thalexweiler =

Coordinates: 49°27′N 6°58′E

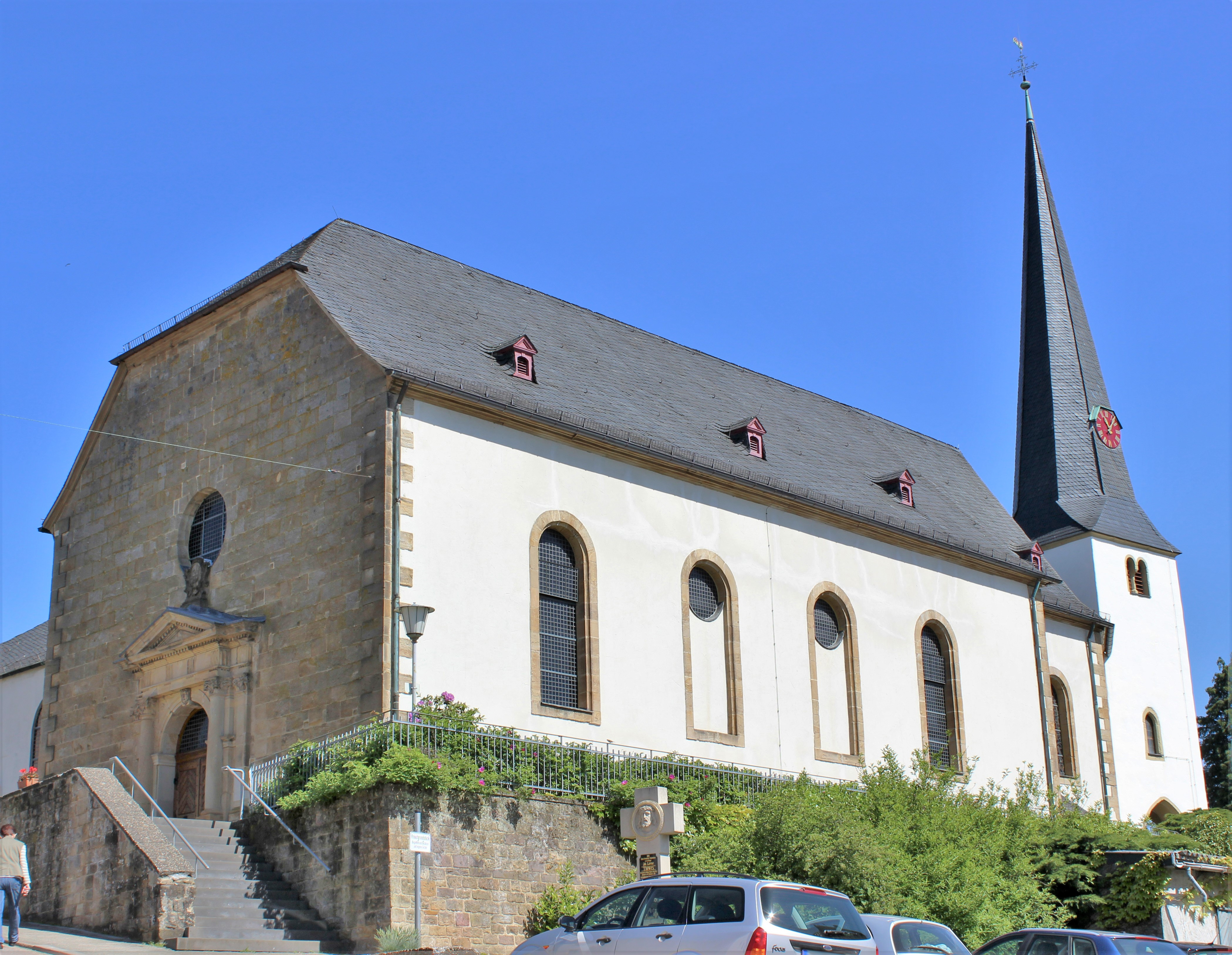
Thalexweiler St. Alban

Thalexweiler is a very small village in the southwest German province of Saarland. The next big city is Lebach. The main part of the village has been founded in 1235 but some parts are a little bit older. The church of the village has been first mentioned in historical documents in the 9th century. The village has approximately 2100 inhabitants which live on an area of 541 ha.
