= Wallerfangen =

- Municipality
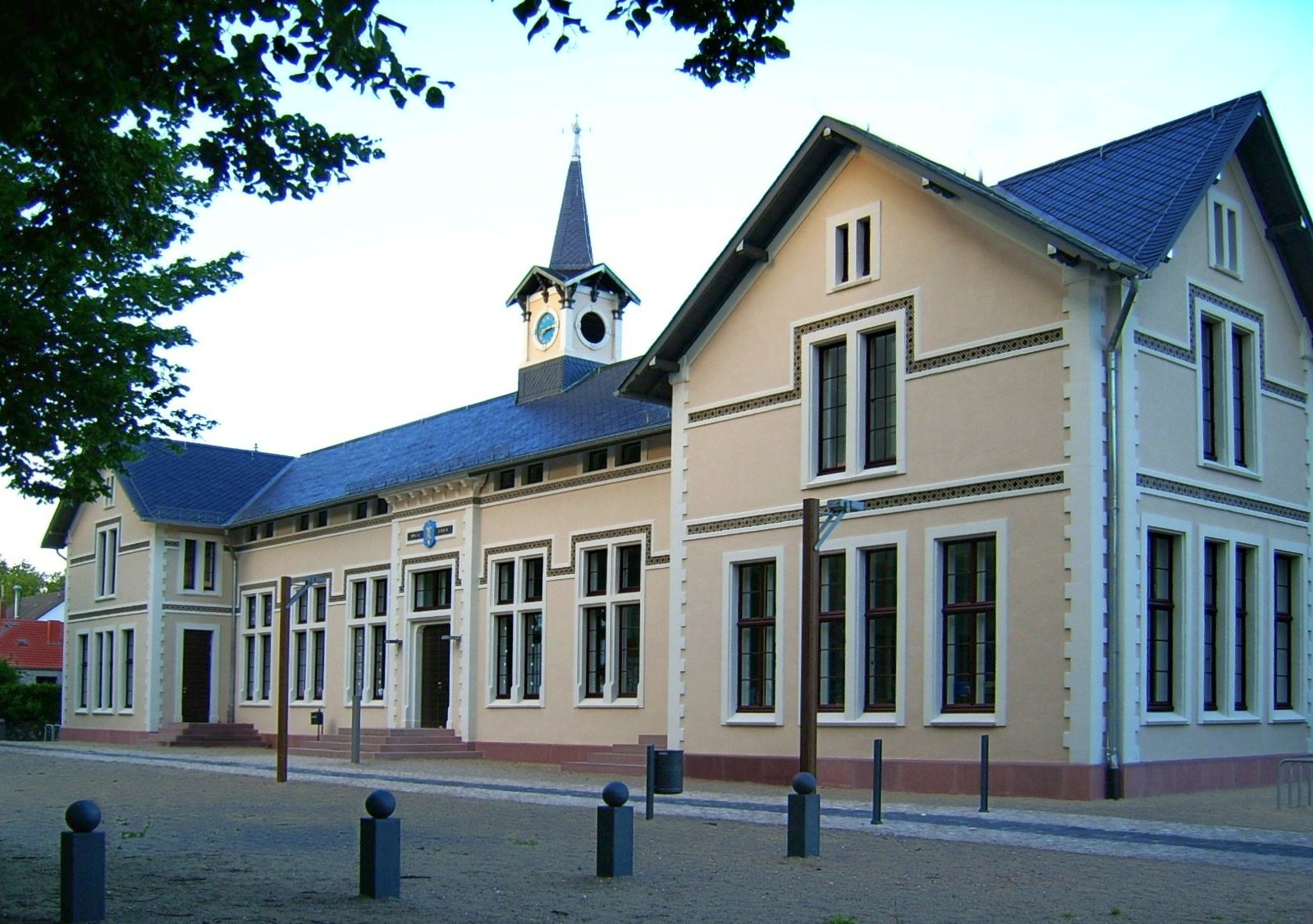

- Coat of arms

- Location of Wallerfangen within Saarlouis district
- Interactive map of Wallerfangen
- Location within Germany Location within Saarland
- Coordinates: 49°18′46″N 6°44′6″E
- Country: Germany
- State: Saarland
- District: Saarlouis

Government
  - Mayor (2019–29): Horst Trenz (SPD)

Area
  - Total: 42.22 km^{2} (16.30 sq mi)
- Elevation: 182 m (597 ft)

Population (2025-12-31)
  - Total: 9,211
  - Density: 218.2/km^{2} (565.0/sq mi)
- Time zone: UTC+01:00 (CET)
  - Summer (DST): UTC+02:00 (CEST)
- Postal codes: 66794–66798
- Dialling codes: 06831, 06837
- Vehicle registration: SLS
- Website: www.wallerfangen.de

Wallerfangen (German pronunciation: [ˈvalɐfaŋən]; French: Vaudrevange, pronounced [vodʁəvɑ̃ʒ]) is a municipality of Saarlouis district, Saarland, Germany. Located west of Saarlouis and along the French border, it is the seat of the villages of Ittersdorf, Ihn, Leidingen, St. Barbara, Kerlingen, Gisingen, Rammelfangen, Oberlimberg, Bedersdorf, and Düren.

== History ==
Formerly called Walderfinga, it was established by the Duchy of Lorraine, and belonged to the Duchy until the Napoleonic Wars in the late 18th century, at which time it came under French control. Up until 1687, Wallerfangen possessed town privileges. In that year, the fortifications and most of the buildings were destroyed and the inhabitants were moved to the newly found town-fortress of Saarlouis.

In 1815, under the Treaty of Paris, Prussia assumed control of the area. For all intents and purposes, it remained in the possession of the German Federation of States until 1919. The Treaty of Versailles created an independent and autonomous territory of Saargebiet, administered by France and the League of Nations until 1935. Under the terms of Versailles, the citizens of the Saargebiet voted to become part of Germany, doing so in spite of Adolf Hitler having assumed power in 1933.

World War II brought much despair and bloodshed for Wallerfangen and its citizens. Being the western border of the German Reich, the area became a battleground in 1944/45, and the area was evacuated en masse twice. After World War II, Wallerfangen belonged to the newly independent, but French-controlled, Saarland.

== Notable people ==
- Irene Gammel, author and biographer
- Franz von Papen, buried there
