= Albert Baldauf =

German politician (1917–1991)

Member of the Bundestag
- In office 15 October 1957 – 17 October 1965

Personal details
- Born: 6 December 1917 Saarlouis
- Died: 25 October 1991 (aged 73) Lebach, Saarland, Germany
- Party: CDU

Albert Baldauf (December 6, 1917 – October 25, 1991) was a German politician of the Christian Democratic Union (CDU) and former member of the German Bundestag.

== Life ==
Since 1952, Baldauf was a co-founder of the then still illegal CDU of the Saarland and worked for the return of the Saarland to the Federal Republic of Germany. In 1957 he became chairman of the Saarlouis district CDU association. Baldauf was a member of the German Bundestag from 1957 to 1965. He represented the constituency of Saarlouis-Merzig in parliament. He was then a member of the Saarland Landtag (1965-1970). From 1956 to 1964 Baldauf was mayor of Wallerfangen.

== Literature ==
Herbst, Ludolf; Jahn, Bruno (2002). Vierhaus, Rudolf (ed.). Biographisches Handbuch der Mitglieder des Deutschen Bundestages. 1949–2002 [Biographical Handbook of the Members of the German Bundestag. 1949–2002] (in German). München: De Gruyter - De Gruyter Saur. p. 1715. ISBN 978-3-11-184511-1.
