= Saar Polygon =

Monument commemorating the coal mining heritage in the Saar district

Coordinates: 49.3181638°N 6.785566°E

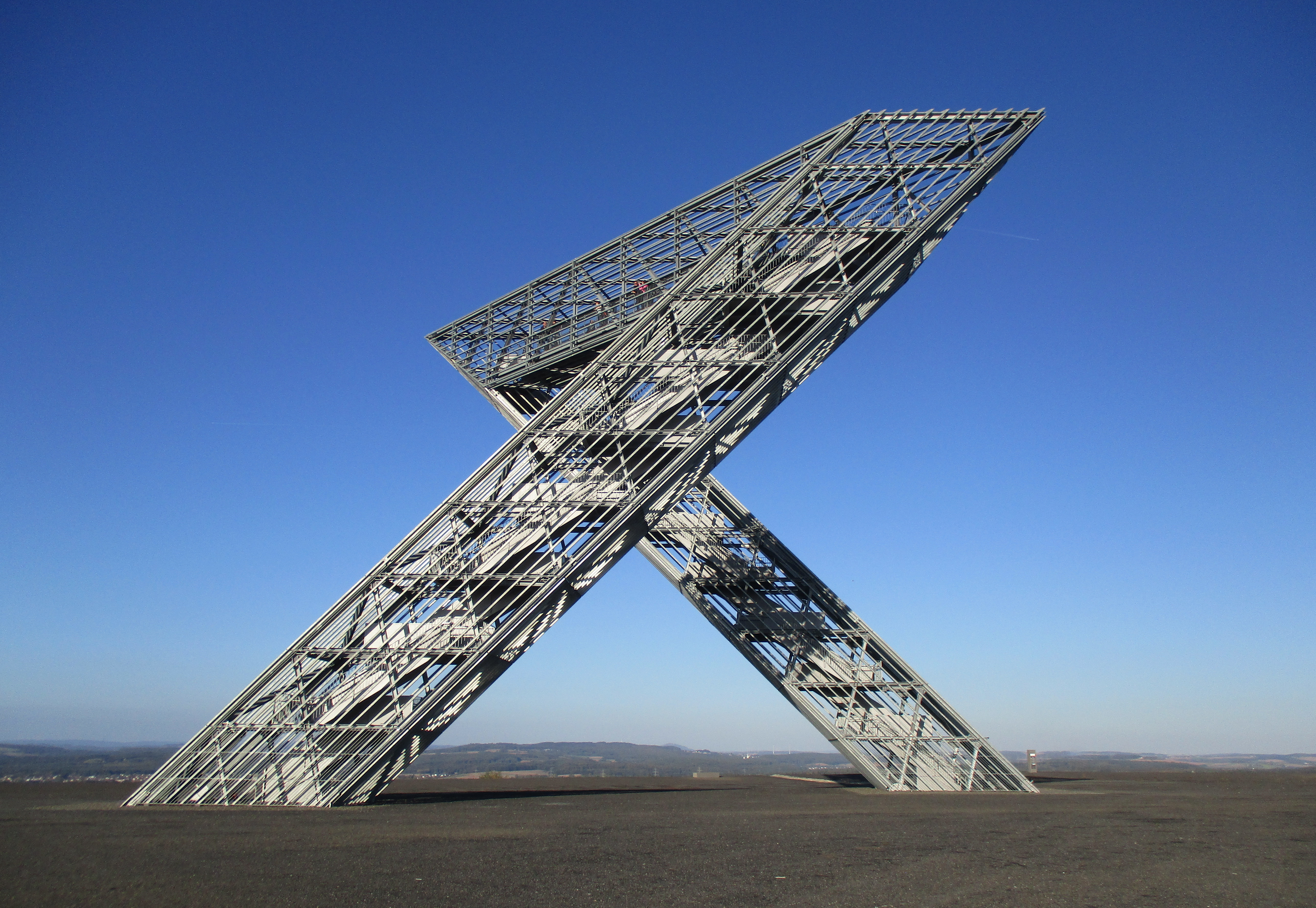
The Saar Polygon

The Saar Polygon in Ensdorf, Saarland is a monument commemorating the coal mining industry in Saarland, which ended in June 2012.

== Background ==
In Saarland, coal has been mined over several centuries. At times, the industry was the largest employer in the region. In June 2012, the last coal mine, Bergwerk Saar, was closed. Since then, there has been no more coal mining in the Saarland. Nevertheless, the history of the coal mining industry, along with its associated traditions, is part of the region's heritage.

== History of the Saar Polygon ==
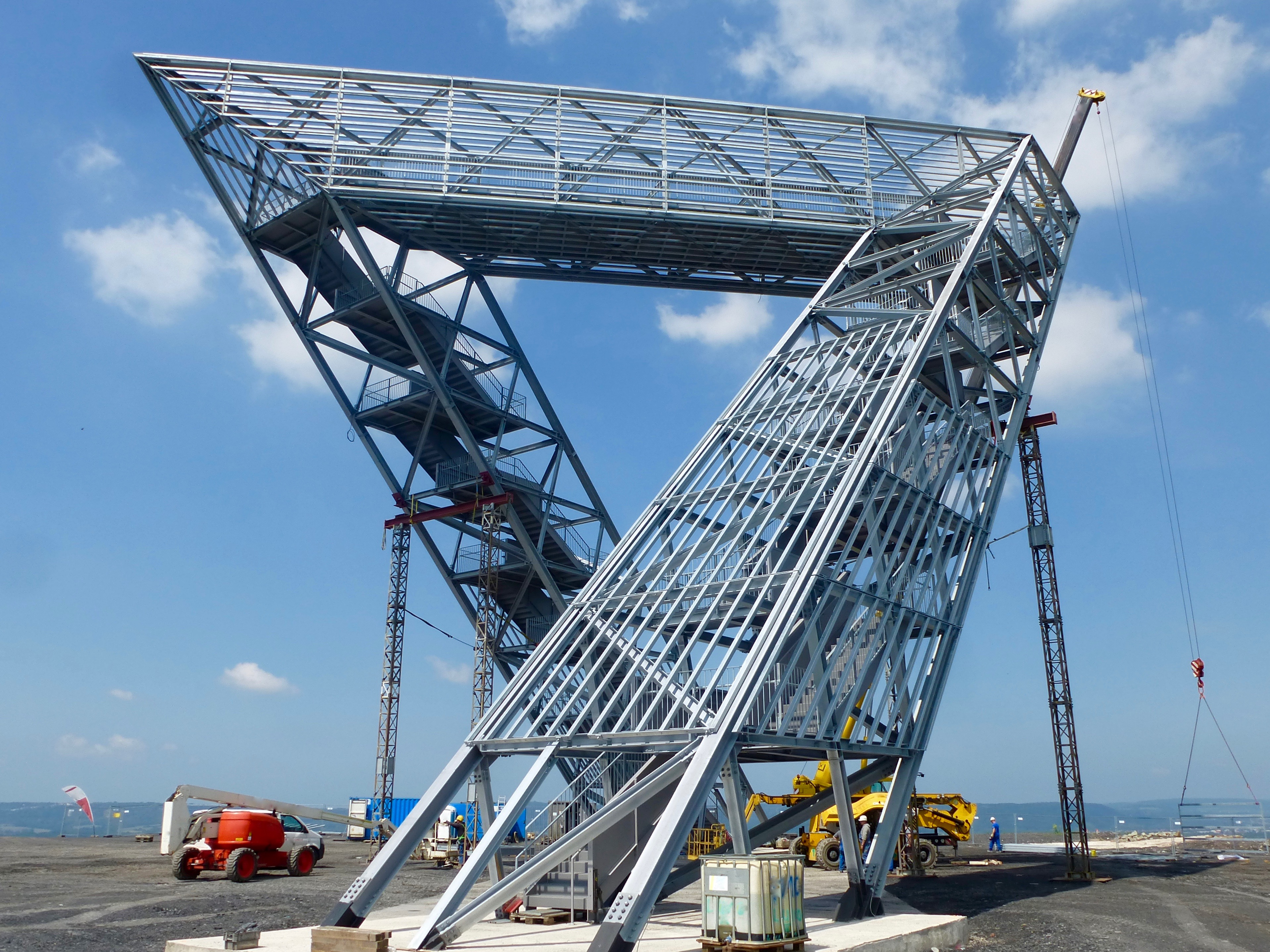
The Saar Polygon under construction

In the setting of the coal mining industry ending, an organization called “Bergbauerbe Saar Association” was founded whose stated purpose is to promote the cultural heritage of mining with the establishment of a landmark that celebrates the contribution that the miners had in the region.

In cooperation with RAG AG, which last operated the coal mining industry in Saarland through its subsidiary, RAG Deutsche Steinkohle AG, a design contest for the monument was announced. 147 designs were submitted, and the winner of the competition was the Berlin architect duo Katja Pfeiffer and Oliver Sachse. Their design for a walk-through large-scale sculpture demonstrates multiple mountain motifs as a symbol of change and is intended appear to be a gateway into the future. The meaning behind the design of the steel grid construction is the inseparability the past and future of the country and showing the traditional bond of coal, steel and energy in Saarland.

Construction began in late 2015. The sculpture was completed in the spring of 2016 and was inaugurated in September 2016 and opened to the public. The approximately two million euros in construction costs were financed by the association Bergbauerbe Saar Association, RAG AG, the RAG Foundation, the Saarland state government, and donations. Donors could symbolically buy a step inside the monument for 1000 euros; at each level, a plaque with the name of the donor was placed.

== Location ==
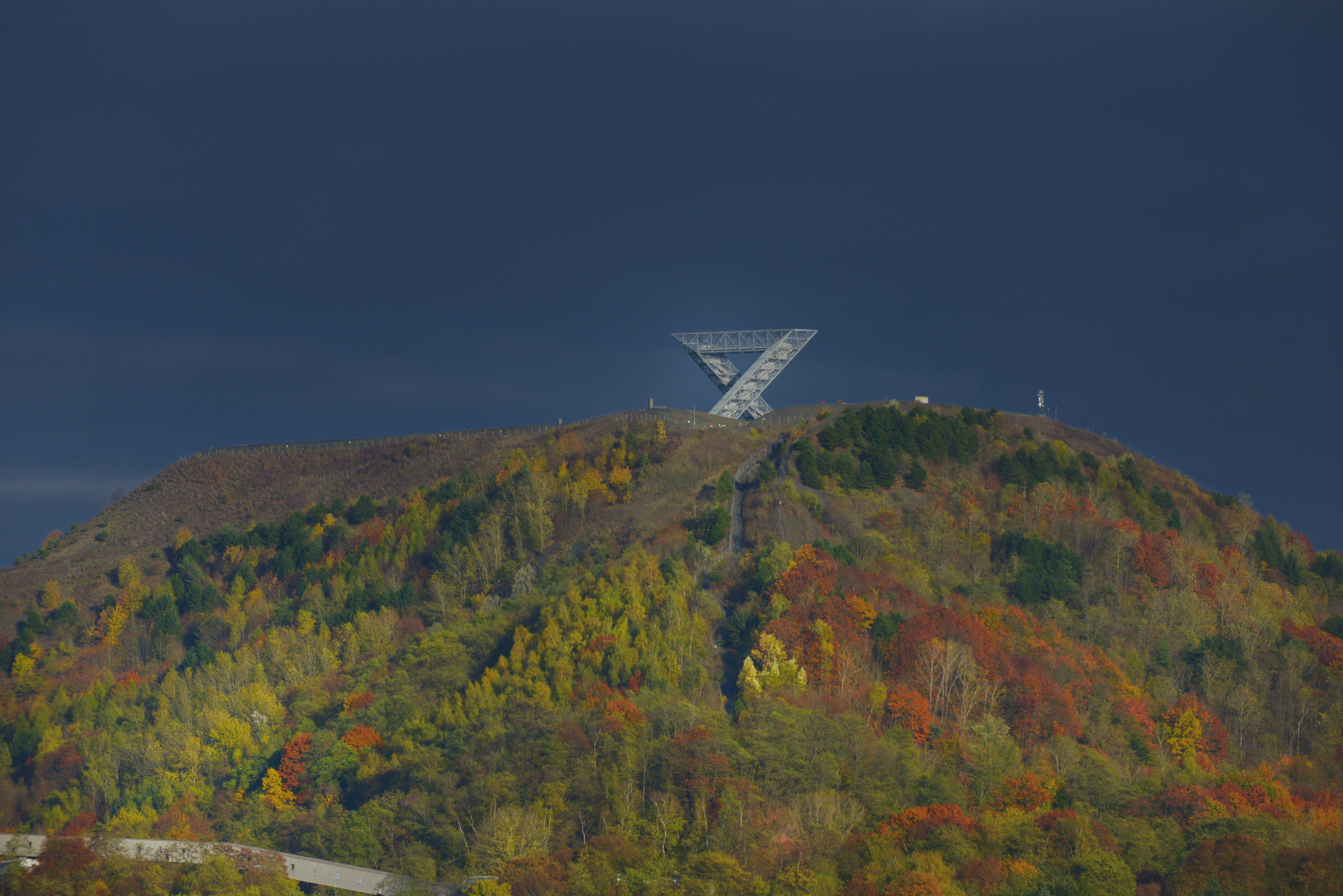
Saar Polygon on the old spoil pile of the Bergwerk Saar coal mine

The Saar Polygon stands on the spoil tip of the Bergwerk Saar coal mine. This pile, with an area of about 50 hectares, rises about 150 meters above the surrounding Saar Valley. Due to its prominent position, the polygon is visible from all directions. France and Luxembourg are visible from the structure.

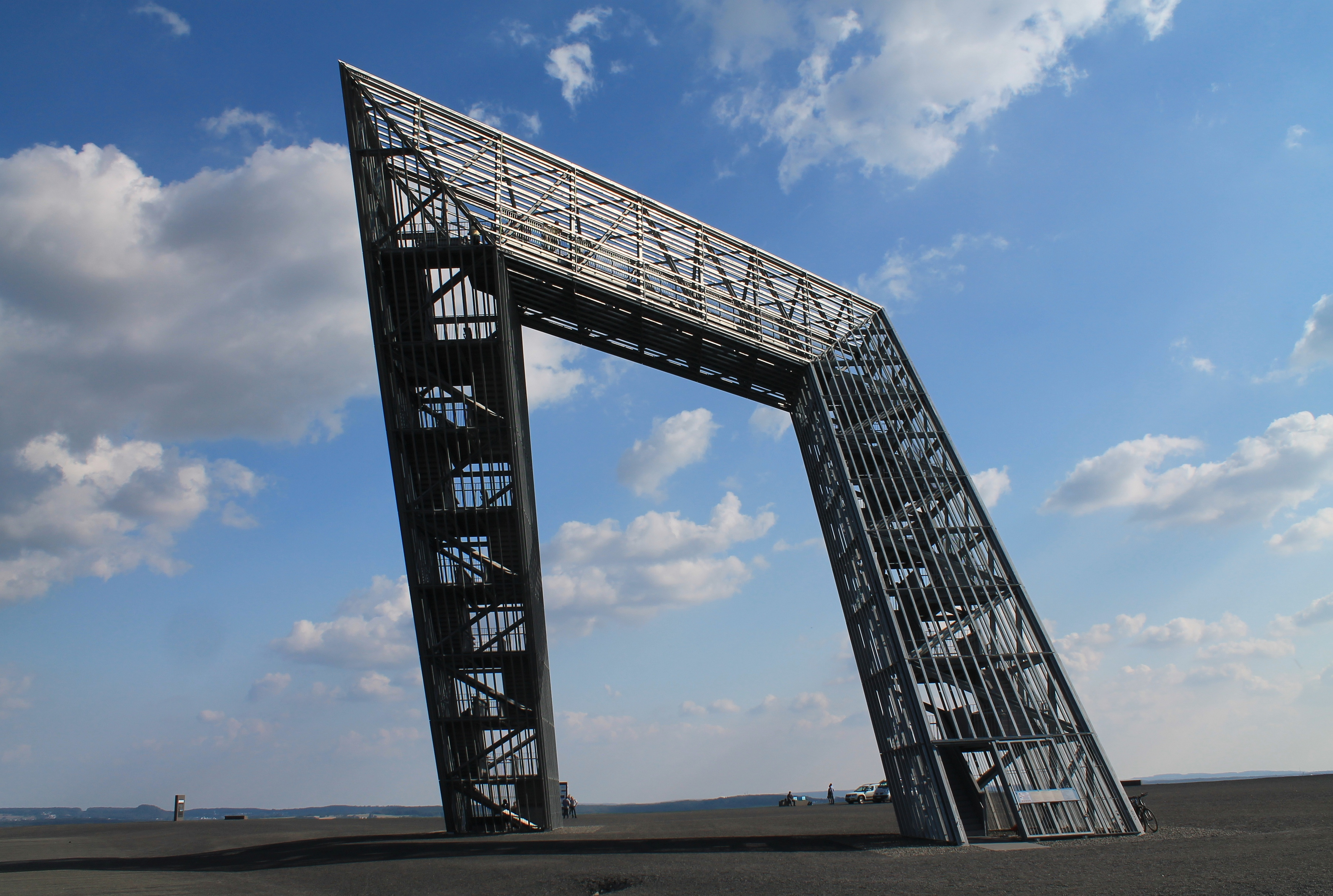
The Saar Polygon is designed to have a different shape depending on the direction in which it is viewed.

== Description ==
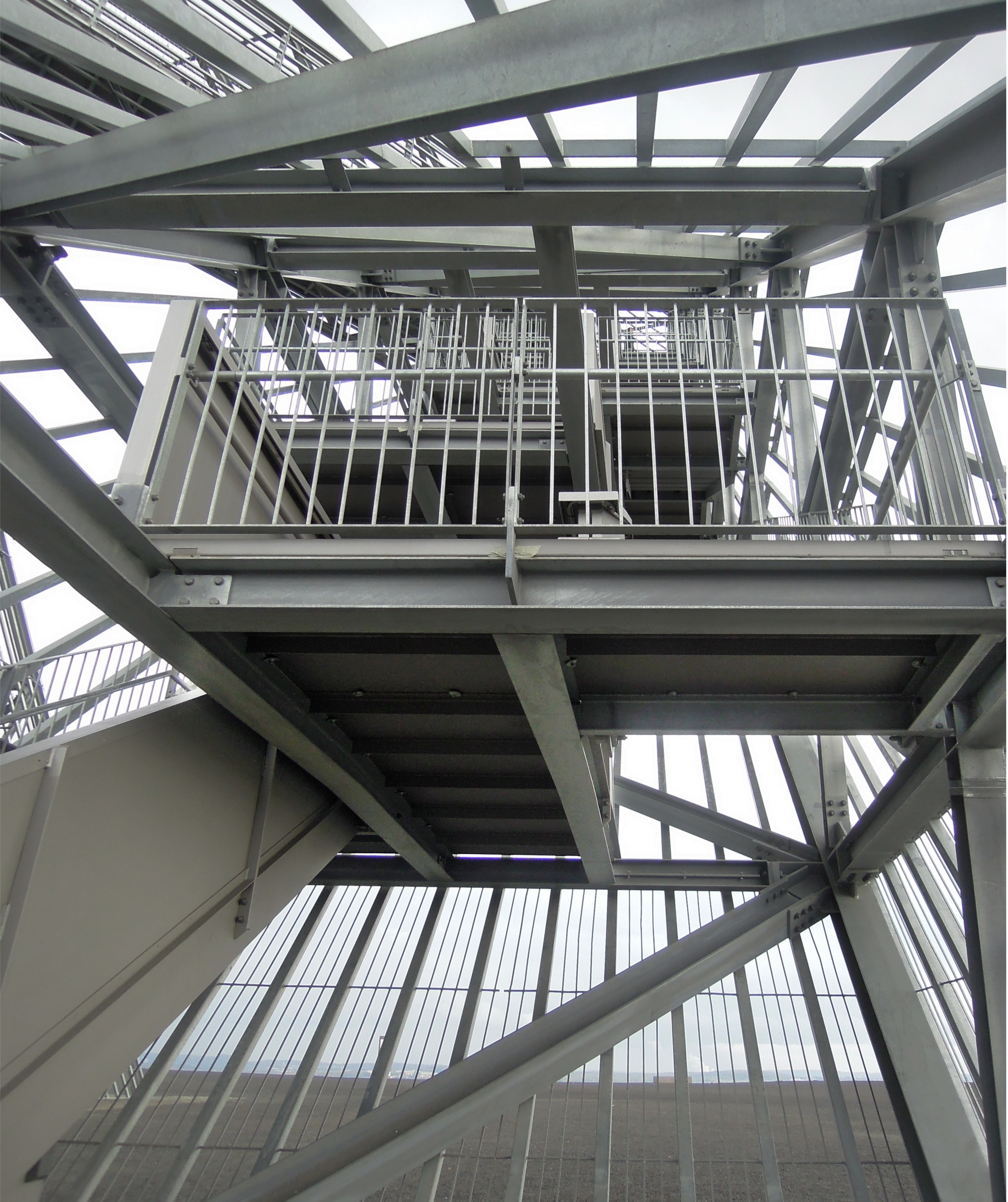
Inside the Saar Polygon

The walk-in monument is about 30 meters high. The top of the structure is a platform, which spans approximately 35 meters long and is supported by two slanting towers with exactly 132 steps going up 25 meters. The viewing platform weighs around 60 tons. The Saar Polygon is designed to have a different shape depending on the direction in which it is viewed, such as a rectangular arch, a triangle, an inverted triangle, and an hourglass. Furthermore, it resembles the structures that are used in mines for support.

== Awards ==
- 1st Prize in the International Ideas Competition, May 2011
- Association of German Architects - Award for Architecture and Urbanism in Saarland, 2017
- Industrieverband Feuerverzinken - Prize for Architecture and Metal Design, 2017
