= Christian Petry =

German politician

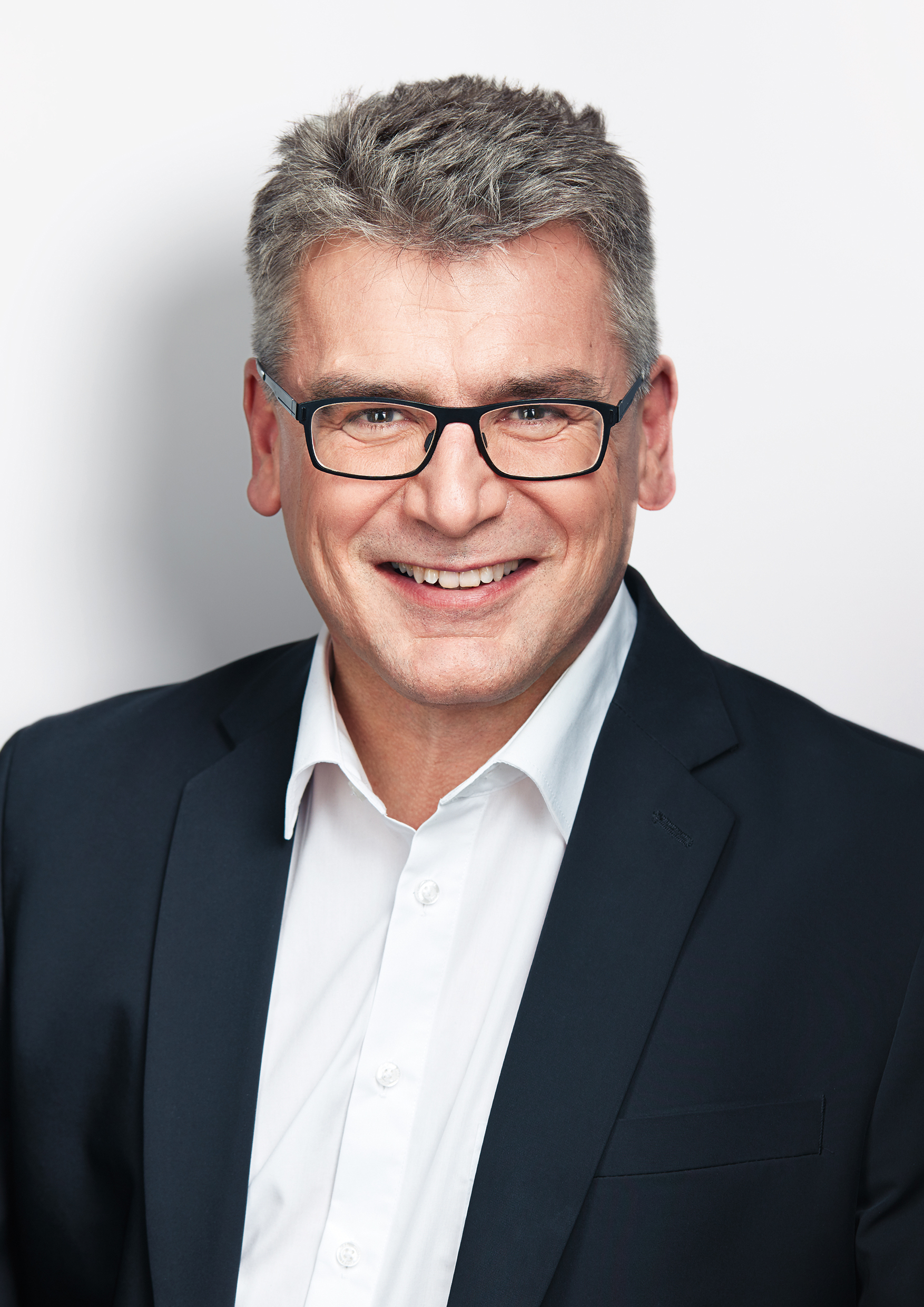

Member of the Bundestag
- Incumbent
- Assumed office January 2014
- Constituency: Saarland list (2014–2021); St. Wendel (2021–)

Personal details
- Born: 15 March 1965 (age 61) Neunkirchen, Saarland, West Germany (now Germany)
- Party: SPD

Christian Petry (born 15 March 1965 in Neunkirchen, Saarland) is a German politician of the Social Democratic Party of Germany (SPD) who has been a Member of the German Bundestag since January 2014, representing constituency 298, St Wendel.

Within the German Bundestag, Petry is spokesman on European affairs for the SPD parliamentary group. and spokesman of the SPD parliamentary group on the Committee on European Union Affairs. In addition, he has served as secretary-general of the Saarland branch of the SPD since March 2018.

== Early life and career ==
Petry studied public administration, economics and business administration, graduating with a degree in public administration from a university of applied sciences.

From 1992 to 1995 Petry worked as a research assistant for the SPD parliamentary group in the State Parliament of Saarland under Reinhard Klimmt, and from 1995 to 1998 he served as the personal assistant and press spokesman of the Saarland's State Minister of the Interior, Friedel Läpple, after which he worked as press spokesman for the SPD parliamentary group in the State Parliament until 1999. He was subsequently a senior officer in the field of citizenship and civil status matters and foundation law in Saarland's State Ministry of the Interior.

== Political career ==
Petry has been a member of Illingen municipal council since 1989; he is also a member of Welschbach local council and has been the leader of the council since 1999.

In 2014, Petry became a member of the German Bundestag. He has since been a member of the Committee on European Union Affairs, the Finance Committee and the Parliamentary Panel on Financial-Market Stabilisation. Since 2018, he has been his parliamentary group's spokesman on European affairs.

In addition to his committee assignments, Petry is a member of the German-French Working Group on the Élysée Treaty and the Inter-Parliamentary Conference on Stability, Economic Coordination and Governance in the EU. He has been a member of the Franco-German Parliamentary Assembly since 2019.

In 2020, Petry also joined the German delegation to the Parliamentary Assembly of the Council of Europe (PACE).

Within the SPD parliamentary group, Petry belongs to the Parliamentary Left, a left-wing movement.

== Other activities ==
- Saarland Technical Relief Assistance Association, President
- Technical Relief Foundation (THW), Member of the Board of Trustees
- Institute for European Politics (IEP), Member of the Board of Trustees
- European Movement Germany, Vice-president
