= Markus Tressel =

German politician (born 1977)

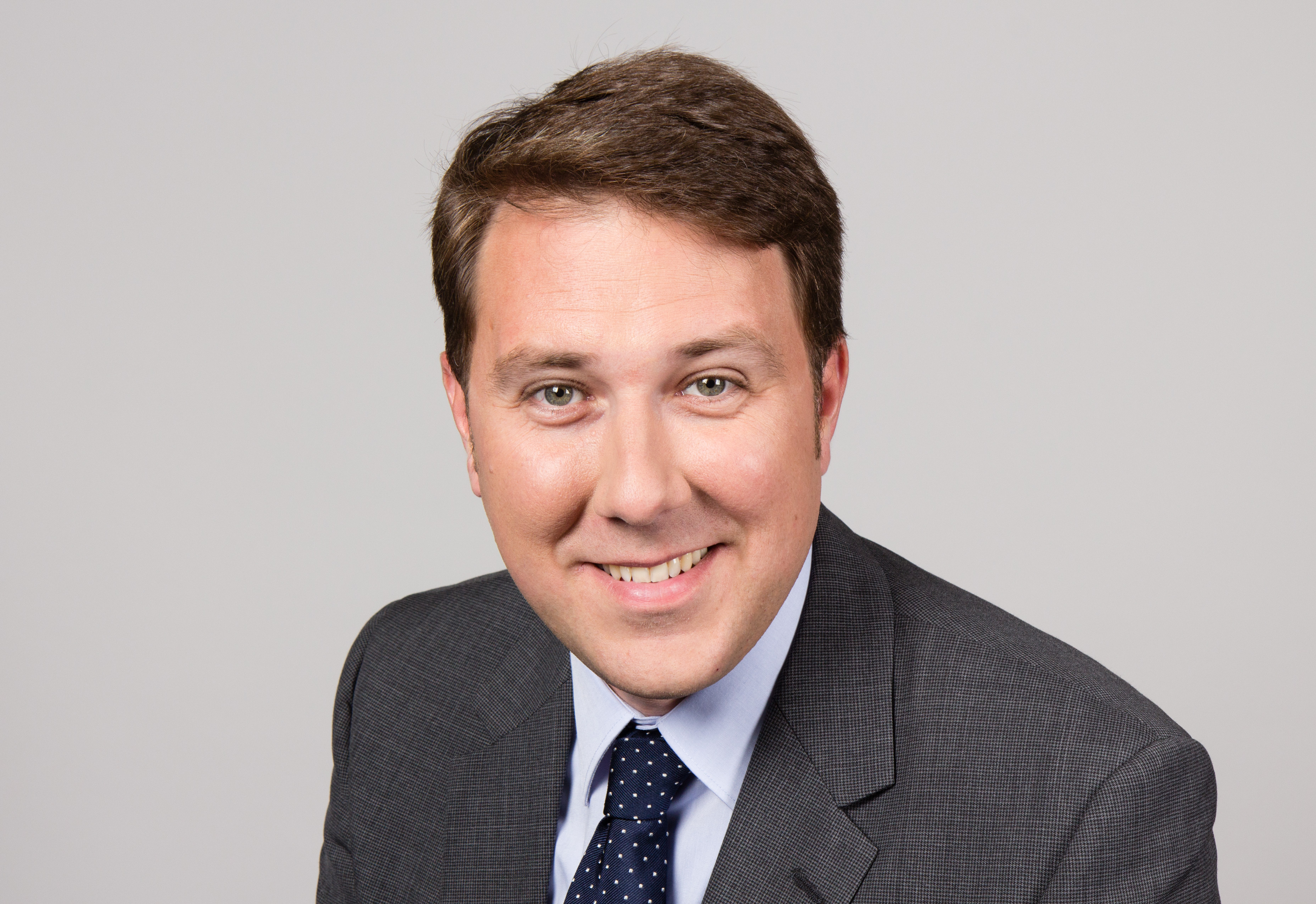
- Tressel in 2014

Member of the Bundestag
- Incumbent
- Assumed office 2009

Personal details
- Born: 17 April 1977 (age 48) Saarlouis, West Germany (now Germany)
- Party: Greens
- Children: Two

Markus Tressel (born 17 April 1977) is a German politician of Alliance 90/The Greens who served as a member of the Bundestag from the state of Saarland from 2009 until 2021. From 2016 until 2021, he also was the party's co-chair in Saarland, alongside Tina Schöpfer.

== Early life and career ==
In 1996 Tressel graduated from the Max-Planck-Gymnasium in Saarlouis, where he was student representative. He dropped out of his studies of political and administrative sciences at Saarland University in 2000 in favour of a position as state manager for the regional association of the Green Party in Saarland.

== Political career ==
Tressel became a member of the Bundestag in the 2009 German federal election, representing the Saarlouis district. He is a member of the Committee on Food and Agriculture and the Committee on Tourism. For his parliamentary group he serves as spokesman for rural areas and regional policy and for tourism policy.

In February 2021, Tressel announced that he would not stand in the 2021 federal elections but instead resign from active politics by the end of the parliamentary term.
