= Ottmar Schreiner =

German lawyer and politician (1946–2013)

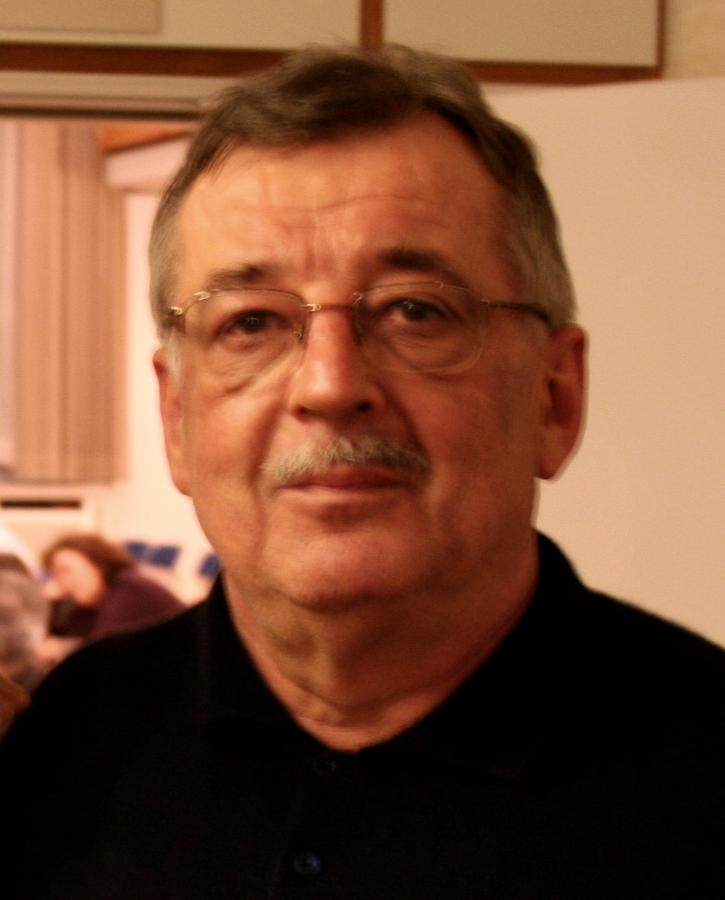
- Schreiner in 2007

Member of the Bundestag
- In office 1980–2013

Personal details
- Born: 21 February 1946 Merzig, Saarland, Germany
- Died: 6 April 2013 (aged 67)
- Party: Social Democratic Party

Ottmar Schreiner (21 February 1946 – 6 April 2013) was a German lawyer and left-wing politician. He was known as one of the leading leftists in his party, SPD.

== Education and career ==
Schreiner studied law at the University of Saarbrücken, the Free University of Berlin and the University of Lausanne. After his Abitur he was a temporary-career soldier (Zeitsoldat); he served as paratrooper officer. After his active career he became a reserve officer. He did reserve officer training in the German Airborne troops (Fallschirmjäger) until his fifties.

In 1969, he became a member of the SPD. He was a founder of the JuSo Hochschulgruppen (Young Socialist Student Groups) and acted as chairman of the General Students' Committee (AStA) at Saarbrücken University, and from there was elected to the federal executive of the Verband Deutscher Studentenschaften, the national confederation of General Students' Committees.

Later he was elected to the Jusos' national leadership. In the election for federal Juso chairmanship in 1977, he was defeated by Klaus Uwe Benneter, who was later suspended from the SPD, and in 1978 he lost to Gerhard Schröder.

From 1980 until his death in April 2013, Schreiner was a member of the Bundestag. He received a direct mandate in the electoral district Saarlouis, which he defended at the federal elections in 2005.

From 1991 to 1997 he was a speaker of the SPD's parliamentary group in the Ausschuss für Arbeit und Sozialordnung (Committee on work and social order). From 1997 to 1998 he was deputy chairman of his party's group in the Bundestag. From 1998 to 1999 he was Bundesgeschäftsführer (executive director) of the SPD. He was the chairman of the Arbeitsgemeinschaft für Arbeitnehmerfragen, a study group inside the SPD, which is reputed to be leftist and closely connected to trade unions. Schreiner was a member of the metalworkers' union IG Metall.

== Death ==
Schreiner died in April 2013 after a long battle with cancer.

Political offices
Previous: Hans-Werner Müller	Direct mandate of Saarlouis; 1990 – 2009	Next: Peter Altmaier
