= Peter Altmaier =

German politician

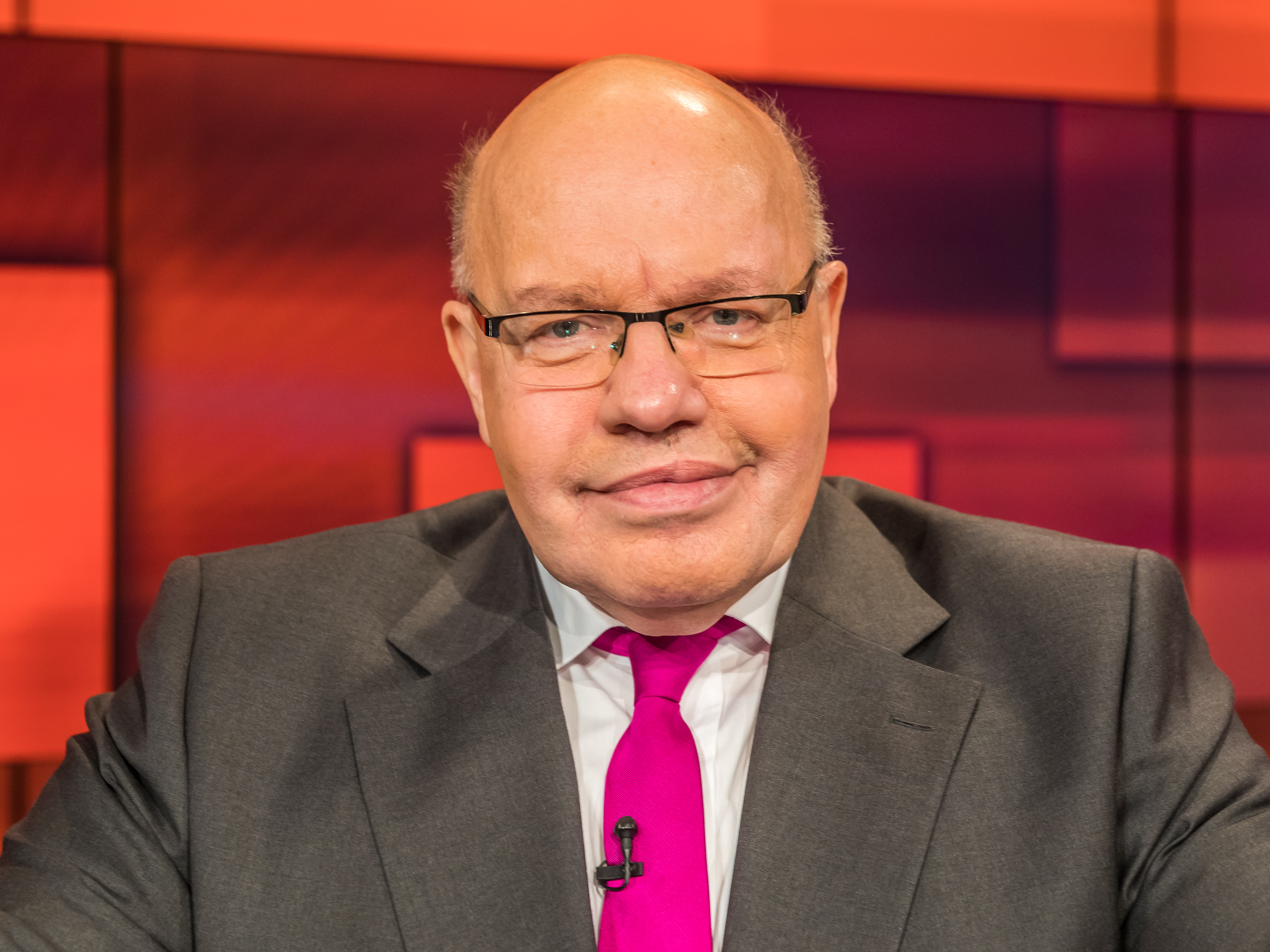

Minister for Economic Affairs and Energy
- In office 14 March 2018 – 8 December 2021
- Chancellor: Angela Merkel
- Preceded by: Brigitte Zypries
- Succeeded by: Robert Habeck

Minister of Finance
- Acting
- In office 24 October 2017 – 14 March 2018
- Chancellor: Angela Merkel
- Preceded by: Wolfgang Schäuble
- Succeeded by: Olaf Scholz

Head of the Chancellery Minister for Special Affairs
- In office 17 December 2013 – 14 March 2018
- Chancellor: Angela Merkel
- Preceded by: Ronald Pofalla
- Succeeded by: Helge Braun

Commissioner for the Federal Intelligence Services
- In office 17 December 2013 – 13 January 2014
- Chancellor: Angela Merkel
- Coordinator: Günter Heiß
- Preceded by: Ronald Pofalla
- Succeeded by: Klaus-Dieter Fritsche

Minister of the Environment, Nature Conservation, Building and Nuclear Safety
- In office 22 May 2012 – 17 December 2013
- Chancellor: Angela Merkel
- Preceded by: Norbert Röttgen
- Succeeded by: Barbara Hendricks

Chief Whip of the CDU/CSU Group in the Bundestag
- In office 27 October 2009 – 22 May 2012
- Leader: Volker Kauder
- Preceded by: Norbert Röttgen
- Succeeded by: Michael Grosse-Brömer

Parliamentary State Secretary in the Ministry of the Interior
- In office 3 November 2005 – 27 October 2009
- Minister: Wolfgang Schäuble
- Preceded by: Ute Vogt
- Succeeded by: Ole Schröder
Parliamentary constituencies
Member of the Bundestag for Saarlouis
In office 27 October 2009 – 26 October 2021
| Preceded by | Ottmar Schreiner |
| Succeeded by | Heiko Maas |
Member of the Bundestag for Saarland
In office 10 November 1994 – 27 October 2009
| Preceded by | multi-member district |
| Succeeded by | multi-member district |
| Constituency | CDU List |

Personal details
- Born: 18 June 1958 (age 68) Ensdorf, Saarland, West Germany
- Party: Christian Democratic Union
- Education: Saarland University

Peter Altmaier (born 18 June 1958) is a German politician of the Christian Democratic Union (CDU) who served as Acting Minister of Finance from 2017 to 2018 and as Federal Minister for Economic Affairs and Energy from 2018 to 2021. He previously served as Federal Minister for the Environment, Nature Conservation and Nuclear Safety from May 2012 to December 2013 and Head of the German Chancellery and as Federal Minister for Special Affairs from December 2013 to March 2018. Altmaier is widely seen as one of Chancellor Angela Merkel's most trusted advisors and advocates for her more centrist wing of the CDU. He is known for his "compromising style" and was described in 2017 as "the most powerful man in Berlin".

During his tenure as economics minister the expansion of renewable energies in Germany dropped signficantly, a development that has since been dubbed the "Altmaier-Knick" or "Altmaier-Delle".

He represented Saarlouis in the Bundestag between 2009 and 2021.

== Personal life and education ==
Altmaier was born on 18 June 1958 in Ensdorf, Saarland. He is the son of a coal miner and a nurse. He studied law at Saarland University.

In addition to his native German, he also speaks English, Dutch and French. In 2012, Altmaier stated that he has always been a single person in his life, "so there can be nothing in the archives about a relationship".

== Early career ==
Altmaier began his career as a research assistant for public and international law at Saarland University in 1995 and later at the European Institute of Saarland University. His tenure lasted until 2000. He worked for the Directorate-General for Employment and Social Affairs of the European Commission from 1990 to 1994.

== Political career ==
Altmaier has been a member of the CDU since 1976.

=== Member of the Bundestag, 1994–2021 ===
Altmaier has been a member of the Bundestag since the 1994 national elections. He was elected in the constituency of Saarlouis. Between 1994 and 2002, he served on the Committee on Legal Affairs and the Committee on Affairs of the European Union, where he was his parliamentary group's rapporteur on matters related to the Charter of Fundamental Rights of the European Union.

When the Bundestag created a committee to examine whether then-Chancellor Gerhard Schröder and others in the governing SPD party inflated economic figures before the 2002 federal elections to hide a growing budget deficit, he was chosen by his parliamentary group to lead the inquiry.

From 2006 to 2011 Altmaier was president of Europa-Union Deutschland, the German section of the Union of European Federalists.

In the 2021 federal elections Altmaier lost his constituency to Heiko Maas, but still reentered the Bundestag through his party's list. However, on 9 October 2021, Altmaier resigned from the Bundestag together with Annegret Kramp-Karrenbauer in order to make room for younger people.

=== Parliamentary State Secretary, 2005–2009 ===
Following the 2005 federal elections, Altmaier became Parliamentary State Secretary in the Federal Ministry of the Interior under Wolfgang Schäuble. In this capacity, he publicly admitted in 2009 that Germany followed a request of the government of Saudi Arabia it to grant influential cleric Abdullah Ibn Jibreen police protection in a Berlin hospital where he was undergoing heart treatment; the decision garnered sharp criticism from the opposition parties, with the Green Party questioning why Germany hosted someone who "has called for the killing of Shiites [and] praised Osama bin Laden."

In 2009, Altmaier was mentioned by international media as potential candidate for the office of European Commissioner.

=== Chief whip, 2009–2012 ===
Succeeding Norbert Röttgen as parliamentary secretary (chief whip) of the CDU/CSU parliamentary group in the Bundestag following the 2009 elections, Altmaier was in charge of negotiating the passage of Eurozone crisis legislation through the parliament. He served as the government's chief negotiator with the opposition Social Democrats and Greens, as well as with potential rebels from the government benches.

In 2012, Altmaier also served as chairman of the Parliamentary Oversight Panel (PKGr), which provides parliamentary oversight of Germany's intelligence services BND, BfV and MAD.

=== Return to the Federal Government ===
On 22 May 2012, Altmaier replaced Norbert Röttgen as Federal Minister for the Environment, Nature Conservation and Nuclear Safety in the second Merkel cabinet.

Altmaier led the German delegation to the 2012 United Nations Climate Change Conference in Doha.

Also in 2012 he cut subsidies for solar power. Expansion of solar energy plummeted from more than 8,000 megawatts a year to under 2,000 megawatts, photovoltaic manufacturers left the country and the German solar industry shrank from 150,000 jobs to 40,000. Also during his tenure, 60,000 jobs in the wind power industry were lost. The terms "Altmaier-Knick" (English: "Altmaier dip") or "Altmaier-Delle" (English: "Altmaier slump") have since been used to refer to the slump of solar energy expansion or the expansion of all renewable energies.

In February 2013 Altmaier and Economics Minister Philipp Rösler reached agreement on far-reaching regulations for the fracking industry.

In September 2013 Altmaier stated that he wanted Germany to increase its efforts to protect the climate. He also demanded companies to harvest metals including rare earths from recycled electronics as Germany sought to become less dependent on imports from China and other nations. Together with his French counterpart Delphine Batho, he put in motion the establishment of the French-German Office for Renewable Energies (L'Office Franco-allemand pour les énergies renouvelables) in 2013.

=== Federal Minister, 2013–2021 ===
In the negotiations to form a government following the 2013 federal elections, Altmaier led the CDU/CSU delegation in the energy working group; his co-chair from the SPD was Hannelore Kraft, Minister-President of North Rhine-Westphalia. In Angela Merkel's third Cabinet he serves as the Head of the Federal Chancellery and a Federal Minister for Special Affairs. In this capacity, he is also in charge of co-ordinating Germany's intelligence services.

In July 2015, Altmaier invited the United States Ambassador to Germany, John B. Emerson, to explain documents publicized by WikiLeaks that showed what appeared to be summaries of recorded conversations involving Chancellor Merkel or senior officials. Shortly after, WikiLeaks released additional documents including Altmaier's telephone number, adding to a growing pile of allegations that United States intelligence agencies conducted extensive surveillance of the German government.

In October 2015, Merkel put Altmaier in charge of coordinating Germany's response to the refugee crisis. From early 2017, he was a member of the German government's cabinet committee on Brexit at which ministers discussed organizational and structural issues related to the United Kingdom's departure from the European Union.

Following the 2017 elections, Altmaier became acting and temporary finance minister when Wolfgang Schäuble left office as Schäuble had agreed to become President of the Bundestag.

According to Der Spiegel, Altmaier as economics minister withheld an expert report on the coal phase-out, which served as the basis for legislation on the coal phase-out. Had the report been shared in good time, several resettlements in the Rhenish lignite mining area could have been prevented.

In January 2021 it was reported that Altmaier favoured "seizing control", possibly using Article 122 of the TFEU, "of the (COVID-19 vaccine) production process and ordering companies to manufacture vaccines at multiple sites."

== Political positions ==
=== Domestic policy ===
Altmaier belongs to the more liberal wing of the CDU. In the 1990s, Altmaier advocated the rehabilitation of armed-forces deserters and explicitly criminalizing rape within marriage. He was integral to the Pizza Connection, a group of moderate CDU and Green Party politicians – including Hermann Gröhe, Armin Laschet and Cem Özdemir – who met at Sassella, an Italian restaurant in Bonn.

In June 2017, Altmaier voted in favor of Germany's introduction of same-sex marriage in a conscience vote, unlike the majority of the CDU/CSU (including Merkel herself).

Ahead of the Christian Democrats’ leadership election in 2018, Altmaier publicly endorsed Annegret Kramp-Karrenbauer to succeed Angela Merkel as the party's chair.

=== European politics ===
Responding to a growing unease over Germany's role in bailing out highly indebted European states, Altmaier in 2011 demanded that states that violate the EU's Stability and Growth Pact should be subject to the European Court of Justice. That same year, he advised against Germany pursuing a prompt debt haircut for Greece and warned of the consequences. According to Altmaier, the banks must be supported, in Greece and elsewhere, and the European Financial Stability Facility might have to issue guarantees for the holders of Italian and Spanish bonds, because they also fear that they will be asked to pay up.

=== Economic policy ===
In his position as Minister for Economic Affairs, Altmaier has become a figurehead for efforts to strengthen the European Union's defences against the encroachment of US and Asian technology and healthcare companies. In 2019 he wrote to European Commissioner Margrethe Vestager urging the commission to adopt a harder line on dominant online platforms such as Google and Facebook. Also in 2019, he presented plans to set up a standing government committee which, as a last resort, could decide to temporarily take stakes in German companies that produce sensitive or security relevant technologies. In 2020, he introduced legislation giving the government a right to veto hostile foreign takeover bids for healthcare companies, a measure designed to ensure a continuous supply of essential products during the COVID-19 pandemic in Germany.

== Other activities (selection) ==
=== Regulatory agencies ===
- Stability Council, Ex-Officio Member (since 2017)
- Asian Infrastructure Investment Bank (AIIB), Ex-Officio Member of the Board of Governors (2017-2018)

=== Corporate boards ===
- RAG-Stiftung, Ex-Officio Member of the Board of Trustees (since 2017)
- KfW, Ex-Officio Member of the Board of Supervisory Directors (2013; since 2018)

=== Non-profit organizations ===
- Europa-Union Deutschland, President (2005–2009), Honorary President (since 2009)
- European Movement Germany, vice-president (2002–2009)
- German Institute for International and Security Affairs (SWP), Vice Chairman of the Council
- Migration Policy Institute (MPI), Member of the Transatlantic Council on Migration
- Institute for European Politics, Member of the Board of Trustees (2005–2009)
- ZDF, Ex-officio Member of the Television Board (2002–2005)

Political offices
| Preceded by Ronald Pofalla | Chief of the Chancellery; 2013–2018 | Succeeded by Helge Braun |
| Preceded by Ronald Pofalla | Minister for Special Affairs; 2013–2018 | Succeeded by Helge Braun |
| Preceded by Wolfgang Schäuble | Acting Minister of Finance; 2017–2018 | Succeeded by Olaf Scholz |
| Preceded by Brigitte Zypries (acting) | Minister for Economic Affairs and Energy; 2018–2021 | Succeeded by Robert Habeck |
