= Koblenz University of Applied Sciences =

Public university in Rhineland-Palatinate, Germany

University of Applied Sciences Koblenz
- Hochschule Koblenz
- Type: Public University of Applied Sciences
- Established: 1996
- President: Prof. Dr. Karl Stoffel
- Academic staff: 351
- Administrative staff: 273
- Students: 9,000
- Location: Koblenz, Remagen, Höhr-Grenzhausen, Rhineland-Palatinate, Germany
- Website: www.hs-koblenz.de

Koblenz University of Applied Sciences (German: Hochschule Koblenz, formerly known as Fachhochschule Koblenz or FH Koblenz) is a public university in Rhineland-Palatinate. Although the present university was established in 1996, it has a rich tradition in higher education. The roots of today's Faculty of Materials Engineering, Glass and Ceramics in Hoehr‑Grenzhausen, come down to the 19th century.

== Overview ==
The six faculties of University of Applied Sciences Koblenz currently offer more than 80 degree courses, including bachelor degree courses and master's degree courses. These figures are no more than a snapshot, since the offers are constantly adjusted to current demand trends. Some of the degree courses are offered as correspondence courses or integrated degree programs. As a result of the Bologna process, Hochschule Koblenz has completed the conversion to bachelor's and master's degree courses.

== Faculty and Sites ==
The university spans three campuses in three different cities, Koblenz, Remagen and Höhr-Grenzhausen.

The opening of the new campus complex in 2009 marked a major milestone in the history of Campus Koblenz. On a building site of more than 4 acres, a total of 619 rooms (including 28 seminar rooms, 237 offices and a variety of lecture halls and laboratories with high-tech equipment and up-to-date facilities) were built. Today, this campus complex accommodates four Faculties as well as the university administration. A day nursery run by Studierendenwerk Koblenz is also available on site.

=== Campus Koblenz ===
Campus Koblenz, located in the residential area of Koblenz-Karthause (50°20′10″N 7°34′10″E), accommodates the following university faculties:

- Faculty of Engineering (with the Departments of Mechanical Engineering, Electrical Engineering and Information Technology).
- Faculty of Business Administration
- Faculty building-arts-materials (with the Departments of Architecture and Civil Engineering)
- Faculty of Social Science

=== Campus Remagen ===
Campus Remagen, the northernmost location of Koblenz University of Applied Sciences (50°34′22″N 7°15′12″E), was established as part of the Bonn/Berlin compensation agreement (Berlin-Bonn Act) in 1998. The campus site is located directly on the Rhine, near the Ahr. The campus is equipped with a dormitory that can accommodate 102 students. A daycare center for children of students and employees is also available on site. Access to a beach volleyball court is also available on campus. In addition, an indoor tennis facility, a football court and a swimming pool are located within easy walking distance. The degree courses offered at Campus Remagen are organized by two faculties:

- Faculty of Business and Social Management
- Faculty of Mathematics, Informatics, Technology

=== Campus Höhr-Grenzhausen ===
The tradition of Ceramic Education in Höhr-Grenzhausen (50°25′57″N 7°39′56″E) goes back to the 19th century. Due to the mining of high quality plastic clays in the Westerwald region, crafts pottery and the industrial processing of clay are strongly rooted in the region. Thus, the existing cooperation links with Research institutes like “Deutsches Institut für Feuerfest und Keramik GmbH” provide the students with additional opportunities for training and employment. Research and teaching at the WesterwaldCampus of Hochschule Koblenz focus on modern Materials Science and Engineering with a focus on glass and ceramics as well as the fine arts. Research and teaching are offered in department of the Faculty building-arts-materials:

- Department of Materials Engineering, Glass and Ceramics
- Institute of Artistic Ceramics and Glass

== See also ==
- Fachhochschule
- List of colleges and universities
