= Hans-Werner Müller =

German politician (1942–2026)

Member of the Bundestag
- In office 14 December 1976 – 10 November 1994

Member of the European Parliament
- In office 19 January 1977 – 16 July 1979

Personal details
- Born: 3 September 1942 Wadern, Gau Westmark, Germany
- Died: 7 July 2026 (aged 83)
- Party: CDU
- Occupation: Mechanical engineer

Hans-Werner Müller (3 September 1942 – 7 July 2026) was a German politician. A member of the Christian Democratic Union, he served in the Bundestag from 1976 to 1994 and in the European Parliament from 1977 to 1979.

Müller died on 7 July 2026, at the age of 83.
