= Ensdorf, Saarland =

Ensdorf
- Municipality
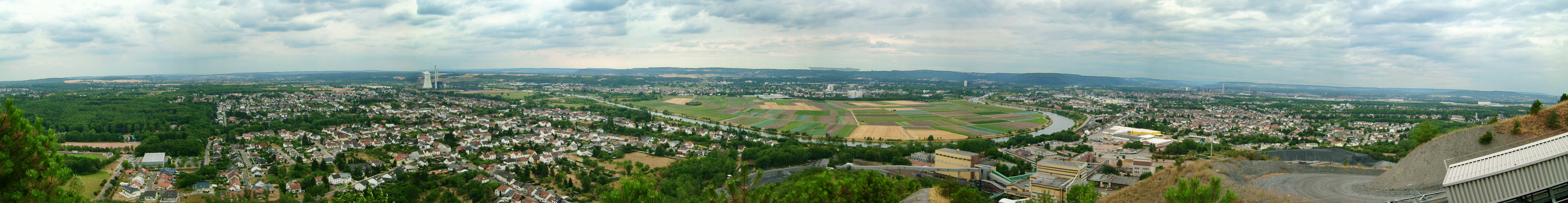

- Coat of arms

- Location of Ensdorf within Saarlouis district
- Interactive map of Ensdorf
- Location within Germany Location within Saarland
- Coordinates: 49°18′N 6°46′E
- Country: Germany
- State: Saarland
- District: Saarlouis

Government
  - Mayor (2019–29): Jörg Wilhelmy

Area
  - Total: 8.39 km^{2} (3.24 sq mi)
- Elevation: 193–329 m (633–1,079 ft)

Population (2025-12-31)
  - Total: 6,833
  - Density: 814/km^{2} (2,110/sq mi)
- Time zone: UTC+01:00 (CET)
  - Summer (DST): UTC+02:00 (CEST)
- Postal codes: 66803–66806
- Dialling codes: 06831
- Vehicle registration: SLS
- Website: www.gemeinde-ensdorf.de

Ensdorf (German pronunciation: [ˈɛnsdɔʁf]) is a municipality in the district of Saarlouis, in Saarland, Germany. It is on the right bank of the river Saar, opposite Saarlouis, approximately 20 km (12 mi) northwest of Saarbrücken.

In February 2023, the American chip manufacturer Wolfspeed announced it would build its first European factory in Germany on the site of a former coal plant in Ensdorf with ZF Friedrichshafen as a coinvestor.

== Landmarks ==
The Saar Polygon is a walk-in monument situated at the former Bergwerk Saar coal mine, completed in 2016 to commemorate the region's coal mining industry.
