= Schmelz =

- Municipality
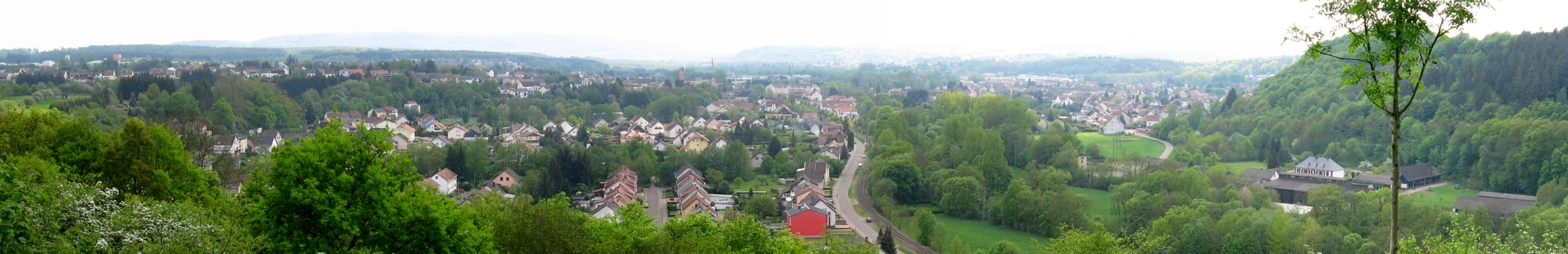
- Panorama of Schmelz

- Coat of arms

- Location of Schmelz within Saarlouis district
- Interactive map of Schmelz
- Location within Germany Location within Saarland
- Coordinates: 49°25′N 6°50′E
- Country: Germany
- State: Saarland
- District: Saarlouis

Government
  - Mayor (2019–29): Wolfram Lang (SPD)

Area
  - Total: 58.62 km^{2} (22.63 sq mi)
- Elevation: 249 m (817 ft)

Population (2025-12-31)
  - Total: 16,869
  - Density: 287.8/km^{2} (745.3/sq mi)
- Time zone: UTC+01:00 (CET)
  - Summer (DST): UTC+02:00 (CEST)
- Postal codes: 66832–66839
- Dialling codes: 06887, 06888;06881 (Primsweiler), 06874 (Michelbach)
- Vehicle registration: SLS
- Website: www.schmelz.de

Schmelz (German pronunciation: [ʃmɛlts]) is a municipality in the district of Saarlouis, in Saarland, Germany. It is situated approximately 15 km (9.3 mi) northeast of Saarlouis, and 25 km (16 mi) northwest of Saarbrücken.

The town of Schmelz (which translates to Glaze) is made of six municipalities, Schmelz itself – which consists of Außen and Bettingen – and Hüttersdorf, Limbach, Michelbach, Primsweiler, and Dorf im Bohnental. These independent villages in the Saarlouis district date back to Roman times. A native of Schmelz would be called a Schmelzer as in a person from Berlin being referred to as a Berliner.
