= Schwalbach, Saarland =

Schwalbach
- Municipality
- Coat of arms

- Location of Schwalbach within Saarlouis district
- Interactive map of Schwalbach
- Location within Germany Location within Saarland
- Coordinates: 49°17′N 6°49′E
- Country: Germany
- State: Saarland
- District: Saarlouis
- Subdivisions: 3

Government
  - Mayor (2025–): Markus Schwarz (Ind.)

Area
  - Total: 27.31 km^{2} (10.54 sq mi)
- Elevation: 250 m (820 ft)

Population (2025-12-31)
  - Total: 17,940
  - Density: 656.9/km^{2} (1,701/sq mi)
- Time zone: UTC+01:00 (CET)
  - Summer (DST): UTC+02:00 (CEST)
- Postal codes: 66773
- Dialling codes: 06831, 06834
- Vehicle registration: SLS
- Website: www.schwalbach-saar.de

Schwalbach is a municipality in the district of Saarlouis, in Saarland, Germany. It is situated approximately 5 km (3.1 mi) east of Saarlouis, and 15 km (9.3 mi) northwest of Saarbrücken.
