= Lebach =

- Town
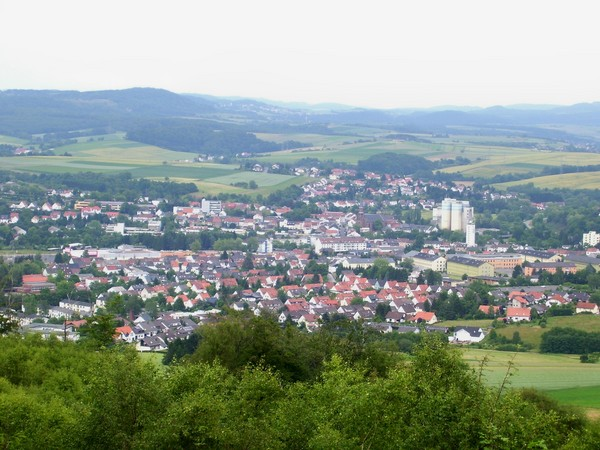
- Lebach in 2007

- Flag Coat of arms

- Location of Lebach within Saarlouis district
- Interactive map of Lebach
- Location within Germany Location within Saarland
- Coordinates: 49°24′36″N 6°54′36″E
- Country: Germany
- State: Saarland
- District: Saarlouis

Government
  - Mayor (2019–29): Klauspeter Brill (Ind.)

Area
  - Total: 64.21 km^{2} (24.79 sq mi)
- Elevation: 200–450 m (660–1,480 ft)

Population (2025-12-31)
  - Total: 19,269
  - Density: 300.1/km^{2} (777.2/sq mi)
- Time zone: UTC+01:00 (CET)
  - Summer (DST): UTC+02:00 (CEST)
- Postal codes: 66811–66822
- Dialling codes: 06881
- Vehicle registration: SLS
- Website: www.lebach.de

Lebach (German pronunciation: [ˈleːbax]) is a town in the district of Saarlouis, in Saarland, Germany. It is approximately 15 km (9.3 mi) northeast of Saarlouis and 20 km (12 mi) north of Saarbrücken. As of 2023, its population was 19,095.

== Mayors ==
- 1978–2006: Nikolaus Jung, CDU (died 2013)
- 2006–2012: Arno Schmidt, CDU (died 2012)
- since 2013: Klauspeter Brill, independent

On January 22, 2006 Arno Schmidt (CDU) won the election against Jürgen Barke (SPD). Arno Schmidt died in 2012 at the age of 60. Klauspeter Brill was elected as mayor on May 26, 2013.

== Education ==
=== Daycare centers ===
- Day care center Aschbach
- Daycare Dörsdorf
- Daycare Lebach
- Daycare Steinbach
- Daycare Thalexweiler
- Kindergarten Herz-Jesu Gresaubach
- Cath. Kindergarten St. Donatus, Landsweiler
- Cath. Kindergarten Hl. Dreifaltigkeit and St. Marien, Lebach
- Day care center "St. Nikolaus", Lebach

=== Elementary schools ===
- Elementary school Landsweiler
- Elementary school Lebach
- Elementary school Steinbach
- Nikolaus-Groß-School Lebach

=== High schools ===
- Geschwister-Scholl High School Lebach
- Johannes-Kepler High School Lebach

=== Community schools ===
- Theeltalschule Lebach
- Nikolaus-Groß-Schule Lebach

=== Vocational school ===
- BBZ Lebach

== Notable people ==
- Rainer Bastuck (born 1960), racing driver and entrepreneur
- Nadine Schön (born 1983), politician
- Klaus Steinbach (born 1953), swimming sportsman

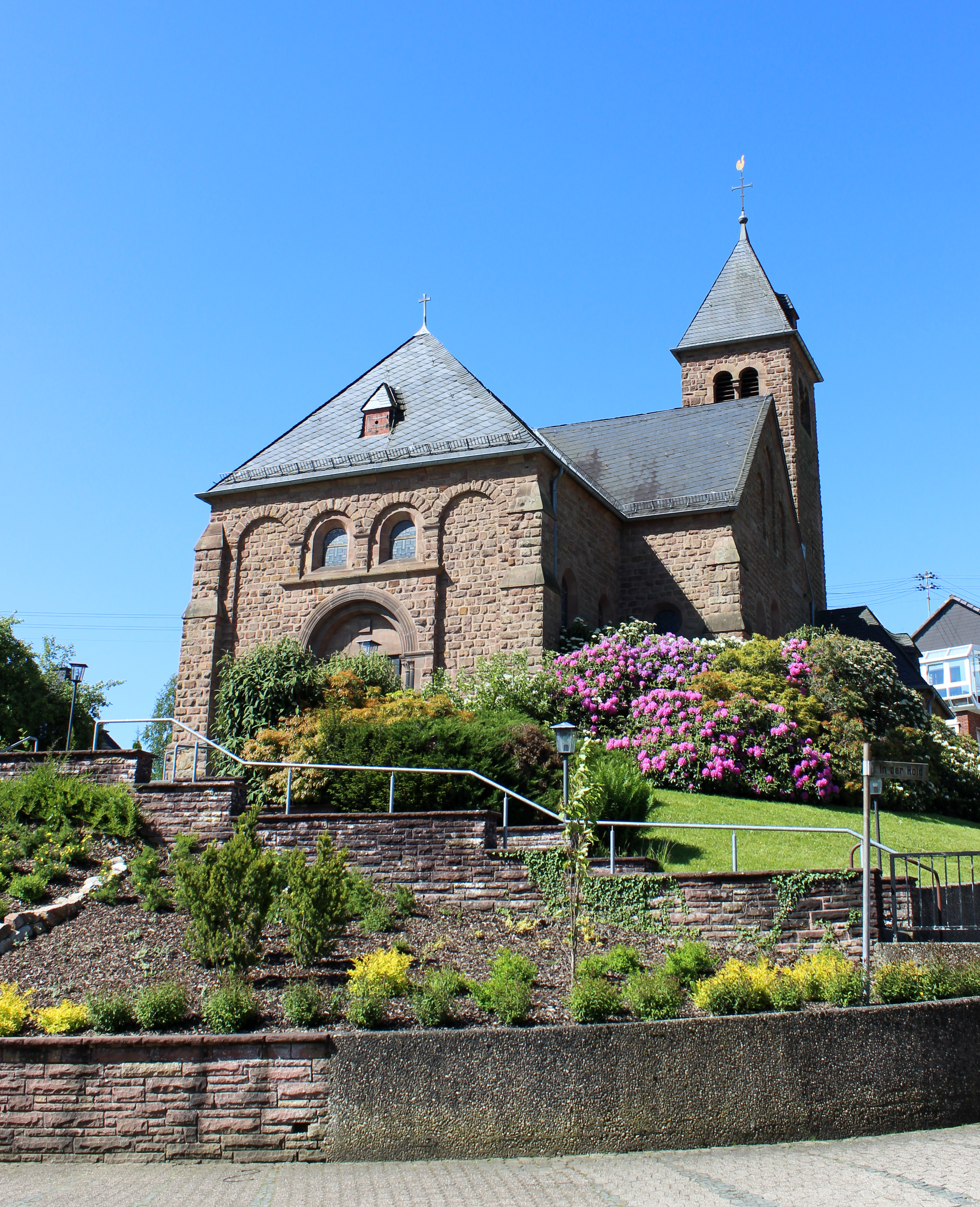
Niedersaubach St. Antonius church

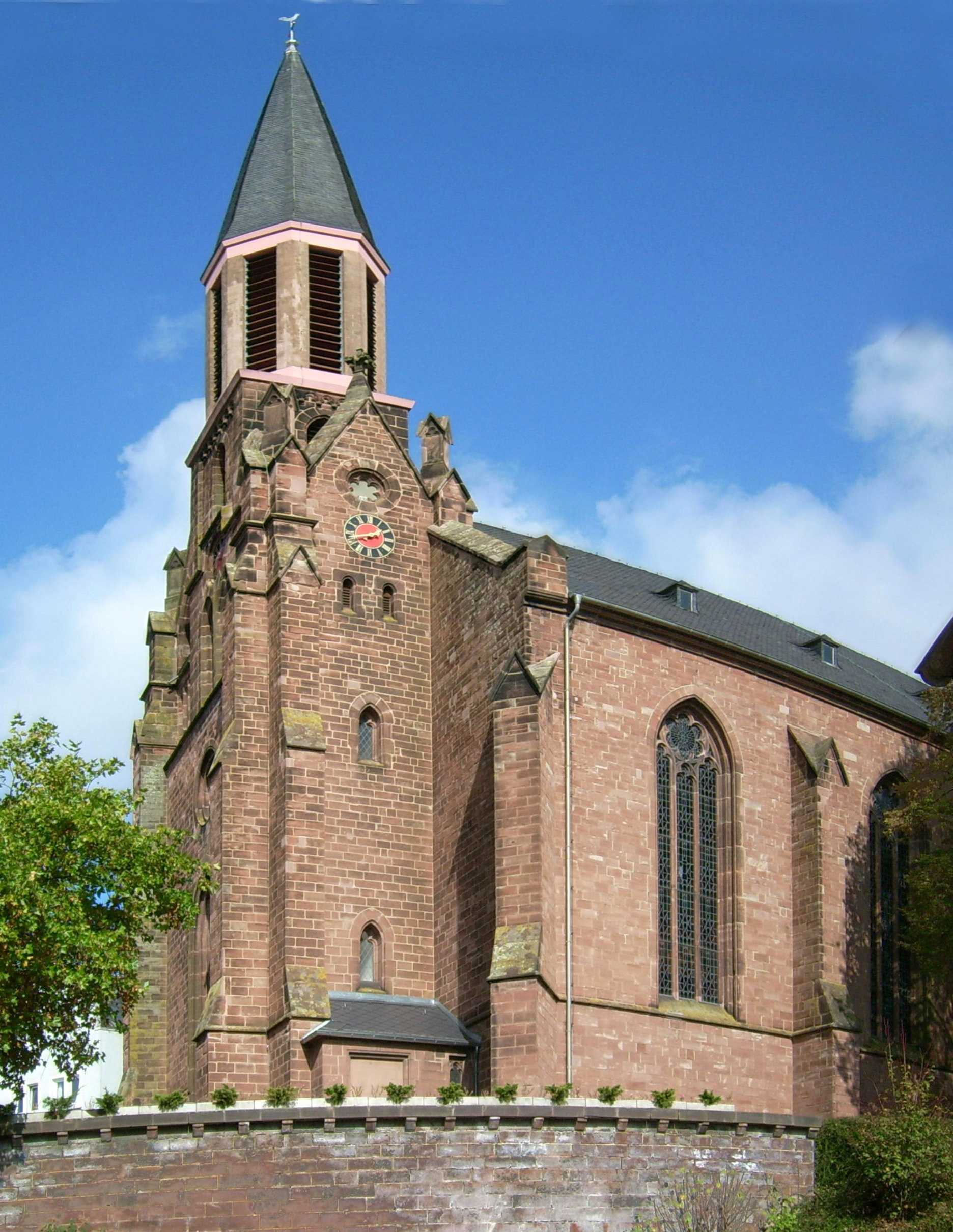
Lebach Catholic church

== See also ==
- Thalexweiler
