= Saarlouis (district) =

Coordinates: 49°20′N 6°45′E

- District
- Flag Coat of arms
- Country: Germany
- State: Saarland
- Capital: Saarlouis

Government
  - District admin.: Patrik Lauer (SPD)

Area
  - Total: 459.08 km^{2} (177.25 sq mi)

Population (31 December 2025)
  - Total: 204,087
  - Density: 444.56/km^{2} (1,151.4/sq mi)
- Time zone: UTC+01:00 (CET)
  - Summer (DST): UTC+02:00 (CEST)
- Vehicle registration: SLS (since 1957); OE 6/ OE 16/ OE 26/ OE 36 (1949–1956); SA 06 (1945–1949)
- Website: kreis-saarlouis.de

Saarlouis (Sarrelouis in French) is a Kreis (district) in the middle of the Saarland, Germany. Neighboring districts are Merzig-Wadern, Sankt Wendel, Neunkirchen, Saarbrücken, and the French département Moselle.

== History ==
The district was part of the Holy Roman Empire of the German nation. The biggest part of the district was part of duchy of Lorraine which gradually came under French sovereignty (still as a part of the holy empire) between 1737 and 1766. Other villages were part of the county of Nassau-Saarbrücken. The territory of the city Saarlouis which was built to protect the border, came to France as part of the three Bishoprics. Other villages, which today are considered to be too small to form villages of their own were independent imperial territories. The district showed the fundamental problem of the whole empire: A strong influence of foreign rulers and micro-sized territories. After the Napoleonic wars the area went to Prussia, which in 1816 created the district as part of its Rhineland province. Between 1936 and 1945 it was called Saarlautern, when the Nazi government attempted to conceal the name's French origin.

== Geography ==
The main river in the district is the Saar.

== Coat of arms ==
The checked black-and-white top part of the coat of arms is taken from the coat of the Hohenzollern, to remember that the area belonged to the German Empire (which was ruled by the Hohenzollern dynasty) directly. The bottom part is the coat of arms of the Lorraine, as Saarlouis belonged to Duchy of Lorraine 1100-1766. The star stands for the French fortress of Saarlouis, the origin of the city, which was built in a star form. The fleur-de-lis comes from the coat of arms of the city Saarlouis.

== Towns and municipalities ==
Clickable map of towns and municipalities in the district

Towns
1. Dillingen
2. Lebach
3. Saarlouis
Municipalities
1. Bous
2. Ensdorf
3. Nalbach
4. Rehlingen-Siersburg
5. Saarwellingen

6. Schmelz
7. Schwalbach
8. Überherrn
9. Wadgassen
10. Wallerfangen

== Education ==
=== Primary schools ===
- Römerschule Pachten
- Philipp-Schmitt-School Dillingen
- Odilienschule Dillingen
- Primsschule Dieffeln
- Primary school Landsweiler
- Primary school Lebach
- Primary school Steinbach
- Nikolaus-Groß-School Lebach
- Primary school "Im Vogelsang" Saarlouis
- Primary school Römerberg Roden
- Primary school "Im Alten Kloster" Fraulautern
- Primary school Steinrausch
- Primary school Prof. Ecker Lisdorf
- Primary school in den Bruchwiesen Beaumarais
- Primary school Bous
- Primary school Ensdorf
- Primary school Nalbach
- Niedschule Hemmersdorf
- Primary school Rehlingen
- Primary school Gutberg Saarwellingen
- Astrid-Lindgren-School Reisbach
- Stefanschule Schmelz with Dependance Limbach
- Johannesschule Hüttersdorf
- Kirchbergschule Schwalbach
- Bachtalschule Elm
- Laurentiusschule Hülzweiler
- St. Oranna Berus
- St. Bonifatius Überherrn
- Primary school Wallerfangen
- Primary school Gisingen

=== Community schools ===
- School at the Römerkastell Dillingen
- Sophie Scholl Community School Dillingen
- Theeltalschule Lebach
- Nikolaus-Groß-School Lebach
- Community School Saarlouis "In den Fliesen"
- Martin Luther King School Saarlouis
- Community school Wadgassen-Bous
- Johannes Gutenberg School Schwalbach
- School at Litermont Nalbach
- Lothar Kahn School Rehlingen
- School at the Waldwies Saarwellingen
- Kettelerschule Schmelz
- School at the Warndtwald Ueberherrn
- Bisttal School Wadgassen / Bous
- School at the Limberg, Wallerfangen

=== High schools ===
- Albert Schweitzer High School Dillingen
- Technical-scientific High School Dillingen
- Geschwister-Scholl High School Lebach
- Johannes-Kepler High School Lebach
- High School at the Stadtgarten (municipal park) Saarlouis
- Max Planck High School Saarlouis
- Robert Schuman High School Saarlouis

=== Vocational schools ===
- KBBZ Dillingen
- TGBBZ Dillingen
- BBZ Lebach
- KBBZ Saarlouis
- TGSBBZ Saarlouis
- Nursing School DRK-Hospital Saarlouis

=== Special schools ===
- AWO-Förderschule mental development leases
- Anne Frank School Saarlouis
- District Special School G Saarwellingen
- State development school social development Wallerfangen
