= Diefflen =

- Stadtteil of Dillingen/Saar
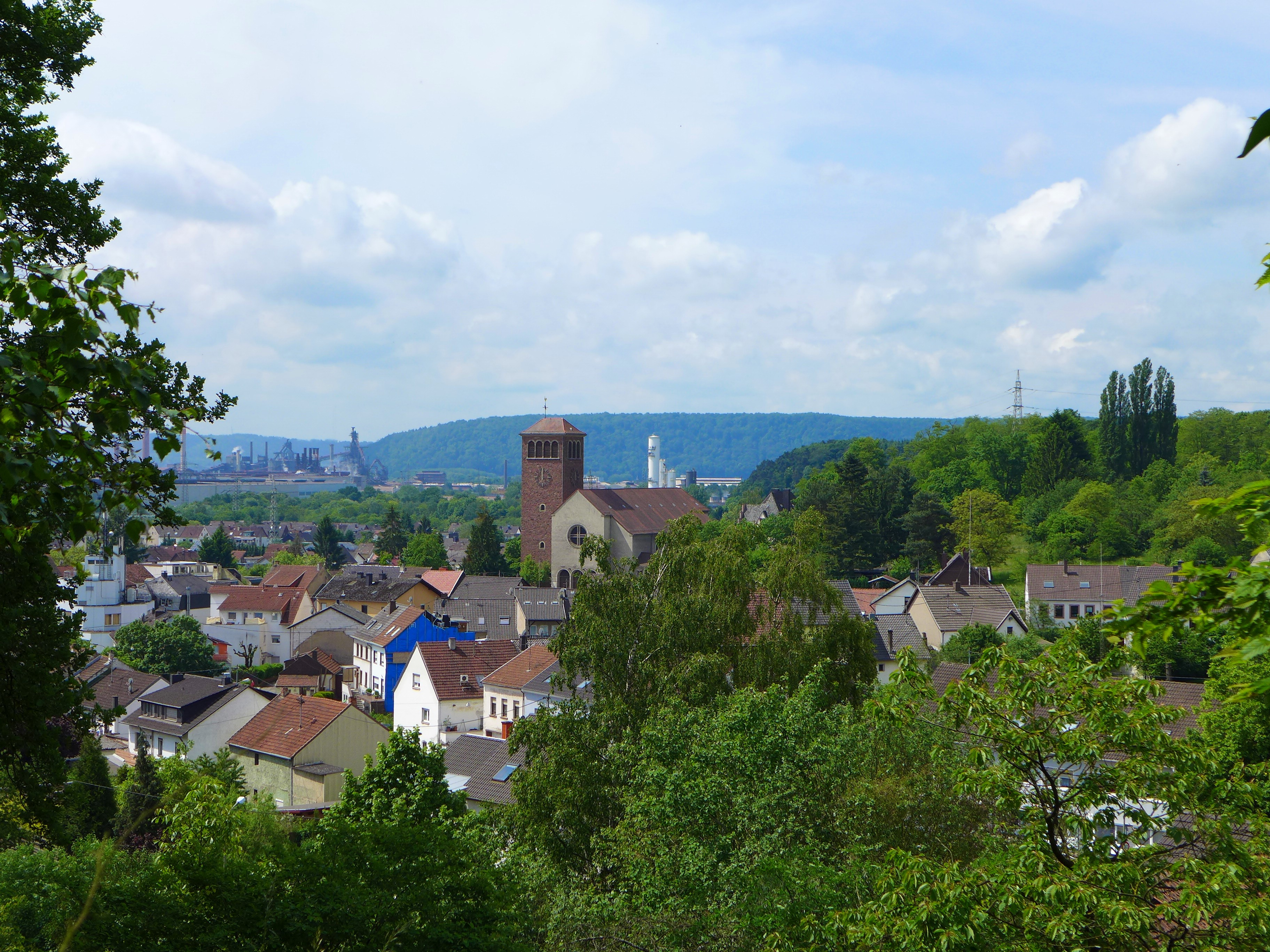
- Interactive map of Diefflen
- Location within Germany Location within Saarland
- Coordinates: 49°21′N 6°45′E
- Country: Germany
- State: Saarland
- District: Saarlouis
- Town: Dillingen/Saar

Area
  - Total: 5.04 km^{2} (1.95 sq mi)
- Elevation: 185–250 m (607–820 ft)

Population (2016-12-31)
  - Total: 4,656
  - Density: 924/km^{2} (2,390/sq mi)
- Time zone: UTC+01:00 (CET)
  - Summer (DST): UTC+02:00 (CEST)
- Postal codes: 66744–66763
- Dialling codes: 06831

Diefflen (pronounced: Dieflen, in the local, Moselle-Franconian dialect Dejfeln) is a district of Dillingen/Saar in the district of Saarlouis (Saarland) and has about 4700 inhabitants. It is located on the lower Prims, a tributary of the Saar. Since its foundation in the High Middle Ages Diefflen was historically linked to the villages of the former "Hochgericht Nalbacher Tal". This association was broken when Diefflen was incorporated into the city of Dillingen/Saar in 1969.

== Geography ==
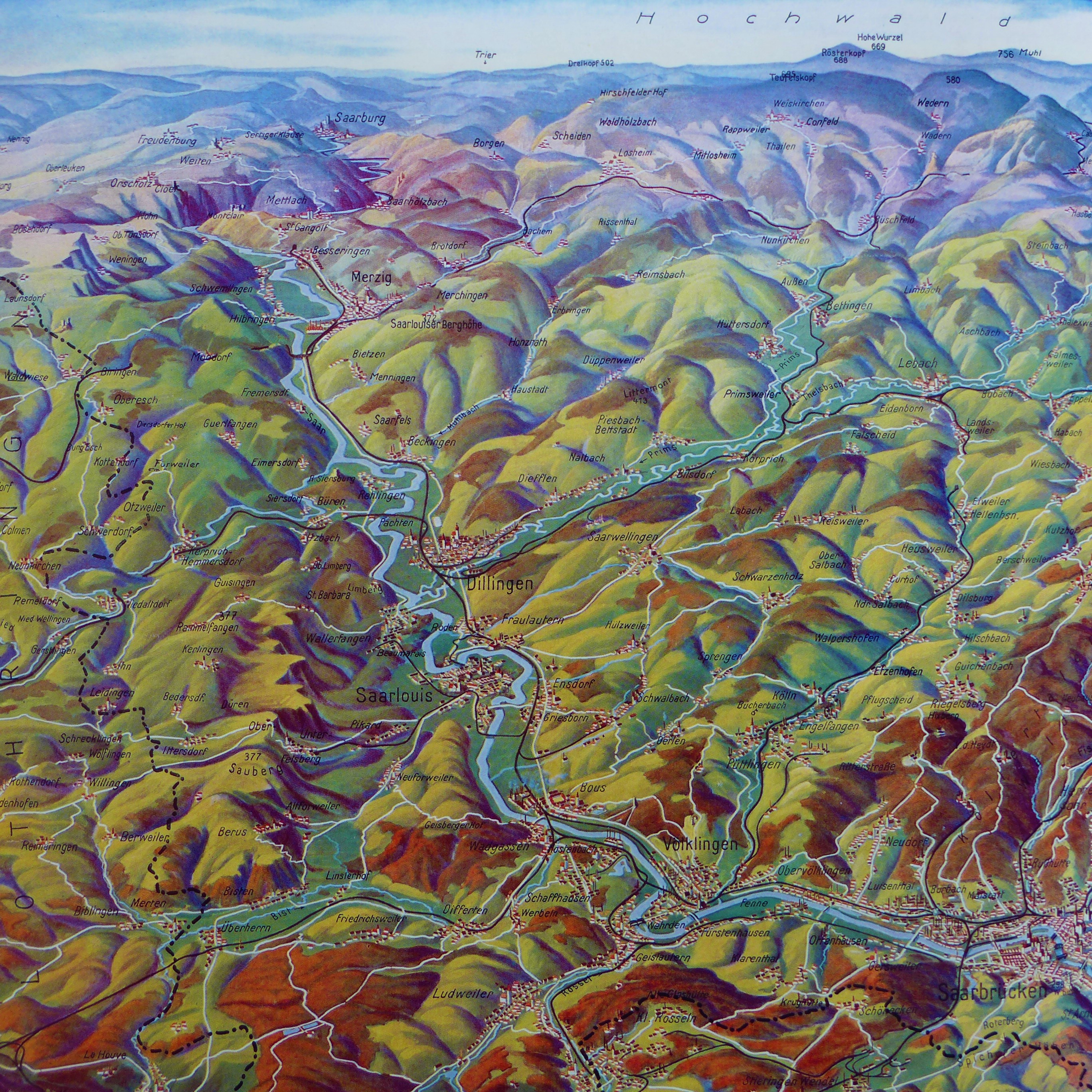
Panoramic map of the surroundings of Diefflen

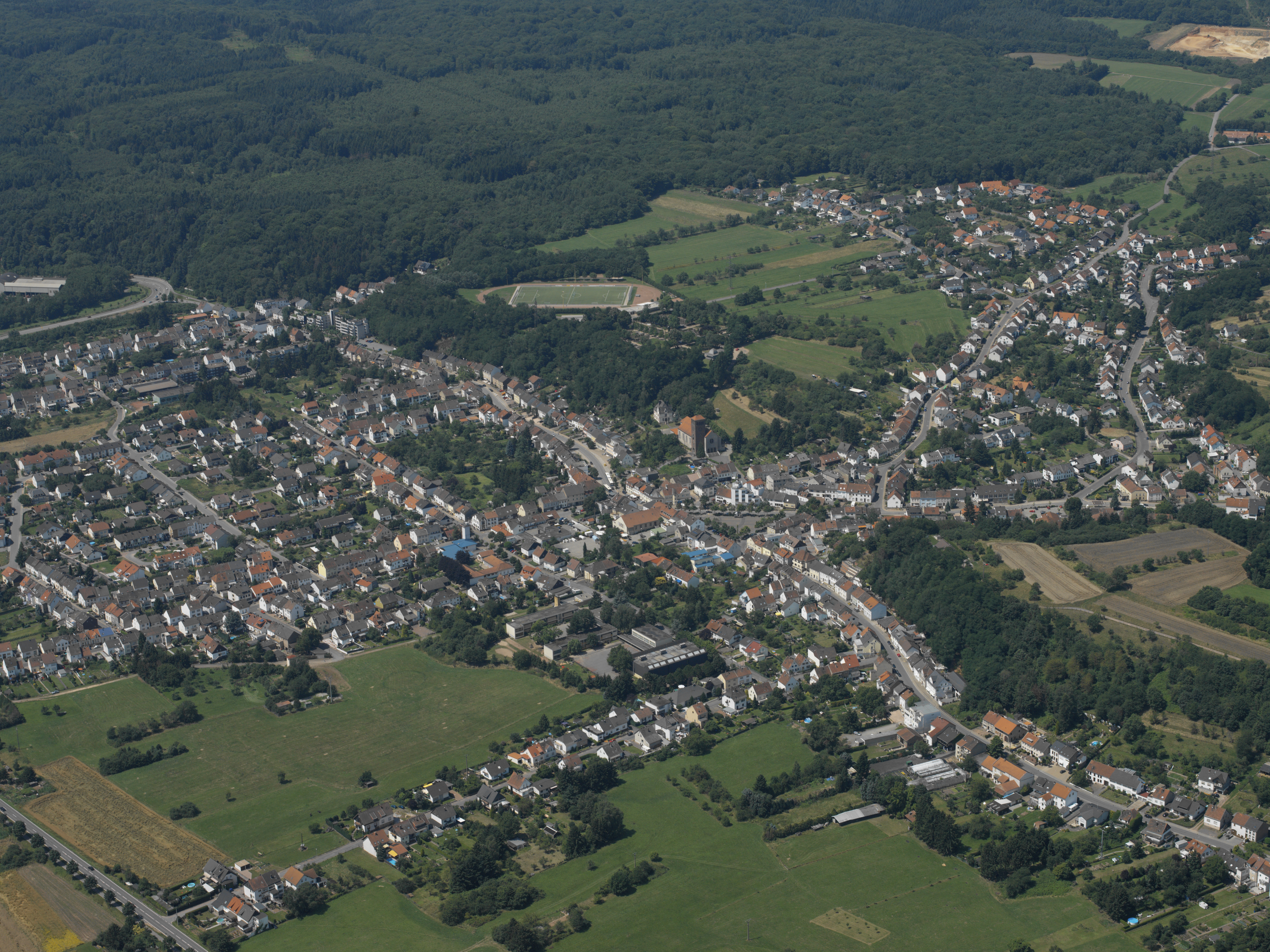
Diefflen, Aerial view from the southeast towards the forest of Dillingen

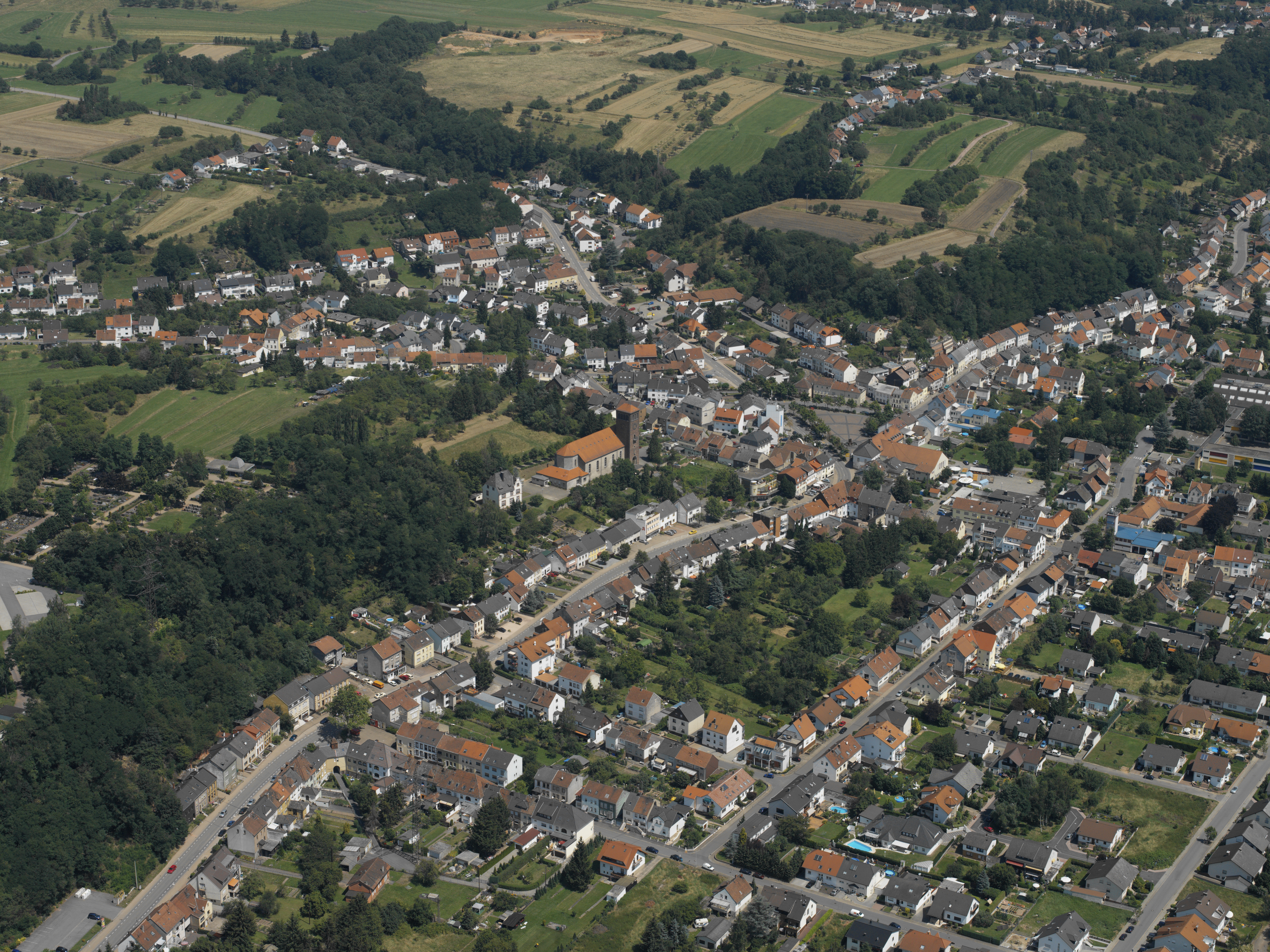
Diefflen, Aerial view from the southwest

=== Physical-geographic classification ===
Diefflen is assigned to the foreland of Hunsrück and thus to the Saar-Nahe Hills and the Lorraine-Cuesta, the easternmost limb of the Paris Basin.

=== Geological-geomorphological situation ===
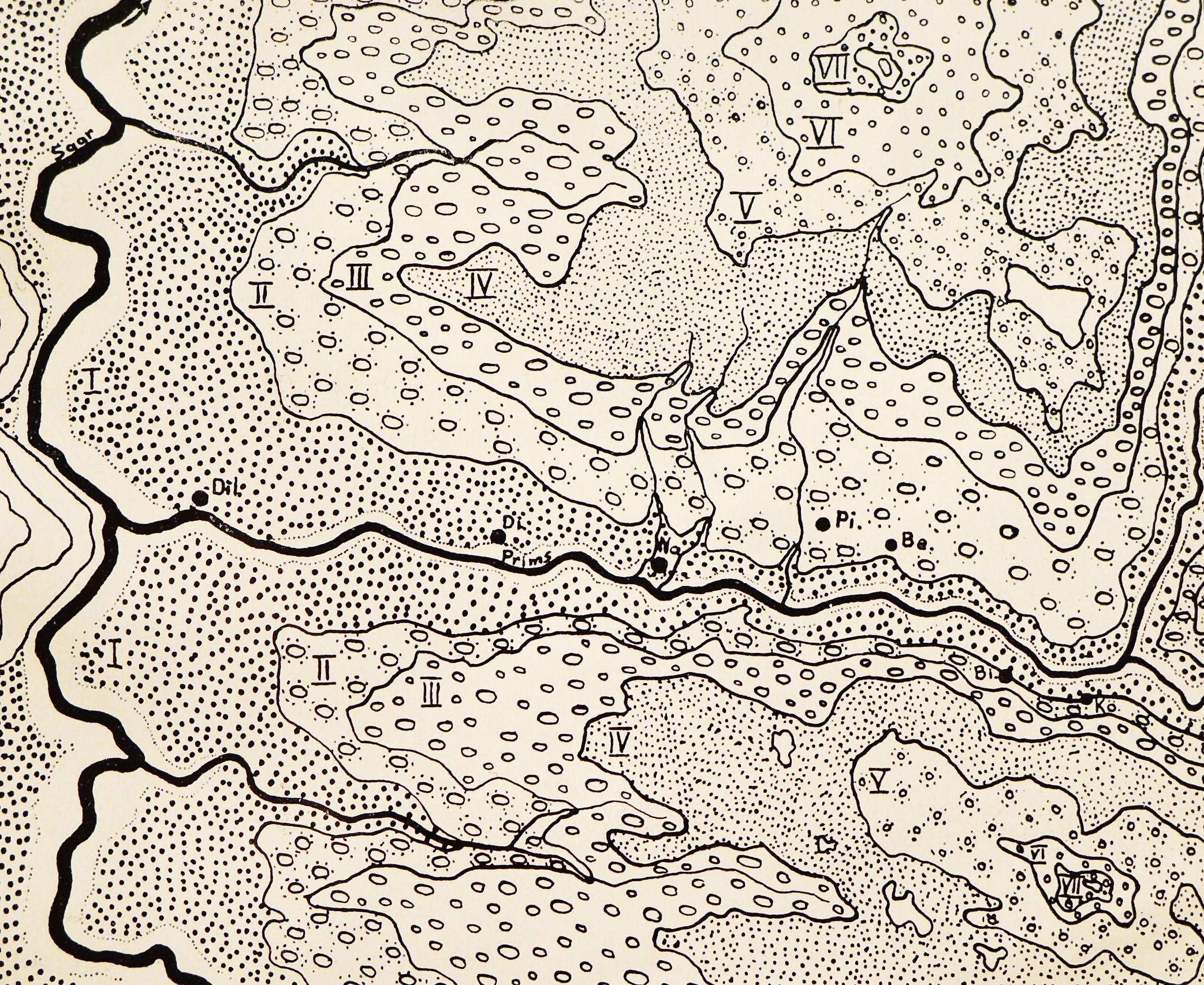
River terraces in the estuary of the Prims in the Saar; Dil = Dillingen/Saar, Di = Diefflen, Na = Nalbach, Pi = Piesbach, Bettstadt, Bi = Bilsdorf, Kö = Körprich; I = Sole terrace, II = Lower terrace, III = Lower main terrace, IV = Upper main terrace, V = Middle terrace, VI = High terrace, VII = Trough terrace (Geographical division: Johann Jakob Reichrath)

The geological underground of Diefflen is the middle Buntsandstein. The Buntsandstein, is the oldest stone package of the Triassic and the outermost edge of the Paris basin. The petrographic nature of the Buntsandstein in Diefflen is medium to sandy to ensure a free circulation of groundwater. The Buntsandstein is therefore an important groundwater carrier, which has high storage capacity for water like a giant sponge. He is reddish colored and fossil-free. This indicates that it originated under continental conditions as a deposit in shallow river valleys or in shallow lakes. The climatic conditions of its formation time about 220 million years ago are comparable to today's dry-subtropical climate.

The Buntsandstein weathered to nutrient-poor, light sandy soils, which are not favorably for an agricultural use and remained largely forested in the history. In contrast to the forest stands on the basic soils of Muschelkalk (Saargau), the soils of the Buntsandstein are rather acidic, so that hornbeams and noble deciduous trees settle less strongly. Instead, birches and pines also appear. Characteristic of the lower forest layers is an oak mixed forest with beech, with the beech gaining the upper hand in increasing altitude. The closeness of the forest was broken up there by man, where the Buntsandstein stain-like younger, tertiary sediments, such as the flooded clay were stored. This happened down to the geological present on either side of the lower valley of the Prims.

To a lesser extent the Buntsandstein is openly visible in Diefflen; to a much greater extent it is covered by the Pleistocene and Holocene deposits of Saar and Prims, which originally flowed here. These deposits belong to a large area of sedimentation, which is triangular in plan. The key points can be described for example by the location of the places Saarlouis, Beckingen and Bilsdorf. Diefflen as part of the Saarland was never glaciated during the ice ages. However, Saar and Prims were only able to transport their material for removal, which fell in large quantities under the climatic conditions of the cold ages, so that it was accumulated on wide valley floors. During the intermediate warm periods, Saar and Prims each cut back into their old valley floors.

The sedimentation area and the underlying subsoil have been altered during the Quaternary by the forces of weathering and erosion. This ultimately led to the area being characterized on the one hand by horizontal surfaces and on the other by slopes. The areas are represented as the banks of the river terraces dated from the Pre-Mindel glaciation to the Würm glaciation, and as the leveling of the floodplain of the Prims. The slopes include the flanks of larger and smaller valleys and the walls of young erosion gorges ("Gräthen"). The areas are proportionally the dominant spatial element; their share amounts to about four-fifths. Diefflen is divided into three zones: the floodplain as part of the lower valley of the Prims, the hillside- and gorges-zone and the plateau of the "Dieffler Terrassenplatten".

=== Neighboring communities ===
The municipality of Diefflen adjoins the following municipalities:

- North = Municipality of Beckingen (Part of town: Beckingen)
- Northwest = City of Dillingen/Saar (Part of town: Pachten, Part of town: Pachtener Heide)
- Northeast = Municipality of Nalbach (Part of town: Bierbach/Ziegelei)
- East = Municipality of Nalbach (Part of town: Nalbach)
- Southeast = Municipality of Saarwellingen (Part of town: Saarwellingen)
- Southwest = City of Dillingen/Saar (Part of town: Dillingen-City centre)
- South = City of Saarlouis (Part of town: Roden (Saar))

Diefflen is about 10 km from the French border. It is located about 65 km from Luxembourg City, 55 km from Metz and Trier and 30 km from Saarbrücken and it is directly adjacent to the urban area of Saarlouis.

== Mayors ==
Mayors of the municipality of Diefflen until the incorporation to Dillingen:

In office	Mayors
1845–1859	Johann Reuter
1859–1867	Johann Jakob Schamper
1867–1870	Bernhard Scherer
1871–1872	Peter Reuter-Scherer
1873–1879	Nikolaus Weyand
1880–1886	Peter Scherer-Marx
1887–1893	Peter Bach-Senzig
1894–1899	Nikolaus Scherer
1900 (Resignation from the mayoralty Fraulautern on 1 January 1900; Foundation of mayoralty Nalbach) –1918	Johann Scherer-Schamper (until March 1918)
1918–1918	Johann Bellmann-Zenner (until December 1918)
1919–1920	Johann Scherer-Schamper
1920–1922	Johann Albert Brutty (Social Democratic Party of Germany)
1922–1926	Jakob Wagner-Bach (SPD)
1926–1930	Johann Dittgen-Kunz (Zentrum)
1930–1935	Peter Reiter-Scholer (Zentrum)
1935–1940	Hermann Greilach (installed as mayor without prior election by the NSDAP)
1940–1945	Johann Feld (installed as mayor without prior election by the Nazi Party; already since September 1938 entrusted as the first alderman with the management of the official duties)
1945–1946	Peter Baumann (installed as mayor without prior election by the United States Army)
1946–1949	Johann Scholer-Diwo
1949–1950	Jakob Lorang-Bach
1950–1953	Jakob Jost-Kunz (Christliche Volkspartei des Saarlandes)
1953–1956	Josef Spurk (Christliche Volkspartei des Saarlandes)
1956–1960	Willi Dräger
1961–1965	Hans Meiers
1965–1968	Nikolaus Friedolin Domma
1968–1969	Hans Ring

== Demographics ==
From 1802 until its incorporation into the city of Dillingen/Saar in 1969, the population of Diefflen developed as follows:

Year	Number of Residents
1802	348
1820	408
1832	613
1837	644
1841	663
1855	829
1860	874
1861	965
1867	1.005
1869	1.105
1871	1.041
1873	1.054
1875	982
1877	980
1885	1.247
1890	1.542

Year	Number of Residents
1895	1.696
1897	1.802
1900	1.868
1903	2.133
1905	2.279
1910	2.663
1912	2.840
1914	3.122
1920	3.435
1925	3.397
1927	3.574
1930	3.570
1931	3.559
1935	3.652
1939	3.759
1941	3.465

Year	Number of Residents
1945	3.580
1946	3.585
1949	3.797
1950	3.811
1951	3.829
1952	3.929
1953	3.965
1954	4.062
1955	4.053
1956	4.059
1957	4.055
1958	4.075
1959	4.016
1960	4.045
1961	4.067
1962	4.112

Year	Number of Residents
1963	4.146
1964	4.213
1965	4.299
1966	4.320
1967	4.348
1968	4.266
1969	4.298
1986	4.465
1987	4.458
1988	4.503
1989	4.526
1990	4.478
1991	4.509
1992	4.589
1993	4.624
1994	4.665

Year	Number of Residents
1995	4.671
1996	4.748
1997	4.741
1998	4.695
1999	4.696
2000	4.722
2001	4.742
2002	4.749
2003	4.706
2004	4.684
2005	4.749
2006	4.709
2007	4.707
2008	4.665
2009	4.662
2010	4.666

Year	Number of Residents
2011	4.659
2012	4.675
2013	4.671
2015	4.643
2016	4.656

== Economy ==
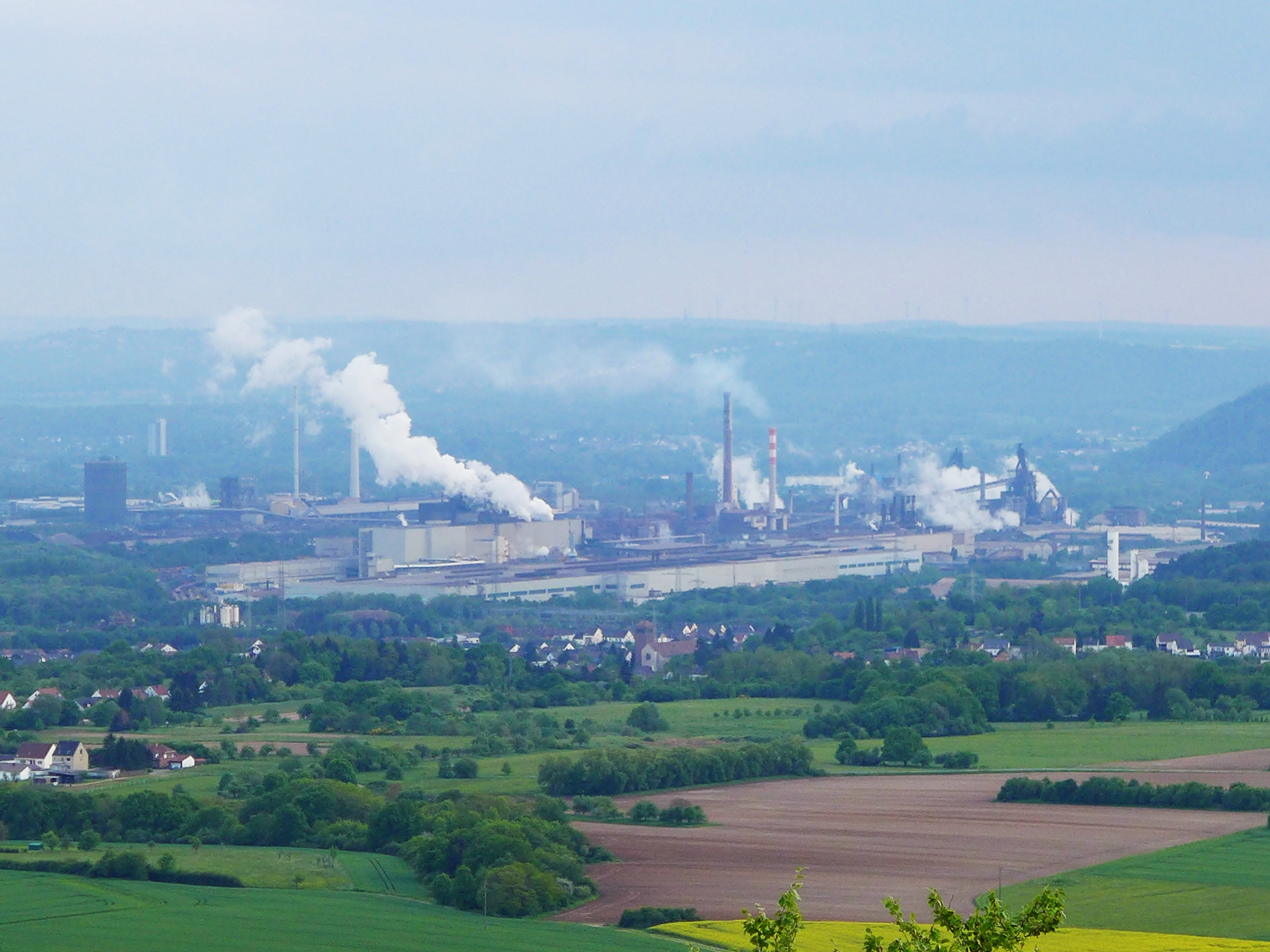
Diefflen with the Dillinger Hütte in the background seen from the Litermont

The most important employers in the immediate vicinity of Diefflen are the steel industry and metalworking companies and the craft assigned. Examples include the Dillinger Hütte, the Bartz-Werke, the Dillinger factory of perforated sheets and the NEMAK aluminum foundry. The automotive industry is represented by Ford on the Röderberg. In the luxury food industry the works of Trumpf Schokolade in Fraulautern and Saarwellingen have to be mentioned. Many jobs are also offered by various retailers. The unemployment rate of the district of Saarlouis was 5.4% in April 2016. The unemployment rate in the district reduced to 4.8% by November 2017. In May 2018, the unemployment rate in the district was 4.6%.

== Transport ==
In the year 1913 in the district of Saarlouis seven electrically operated Tram-lines were built. One of these tram lines led from Saarlouis to Dillingen and a second from Dillingen via Diefflen to Nalbach. The municipal council had decided in 1907, the construction of the tram, as Diefflen had not been included in the construction of the railway line. The official commissioning took place on 1913. Since 1928 there is a bus line from Diefflen to Düppenweiler. In the period from 1953 to 1963 there was a conversion from tram to bus operation. The entire municipality (with Dillingen and Pachten) is now connected by thirteen bus lines.

=== Autobahn ===
Diefflen is connected to the national and international highway network via several motorway interchanges: the Dillingen-Mitte (No. 8) and Dillingen-Süd (No. 10) junctions are on the Bundesautobahn 8, that runs 497 km (309 mi) from the Luxembourg A13 motorway at Schengen via Neunkirchen, Pirmasens, Karlsruhe, Stuttgart, Ulm, Augsburg and Munich to the Austrian West Autobahn near Salzburg. In addition, Diefflen is connected via the Saarlouis interchange (No. 9 ) to the Bundesautobahn 620, connecting Saarlouis with Saarbrücken. From here, there is a connection to Bundesautobahn 1, that runs from Saarbrücken to Heiligenhafen in Schleswig-Holstein.

=== Rail ===
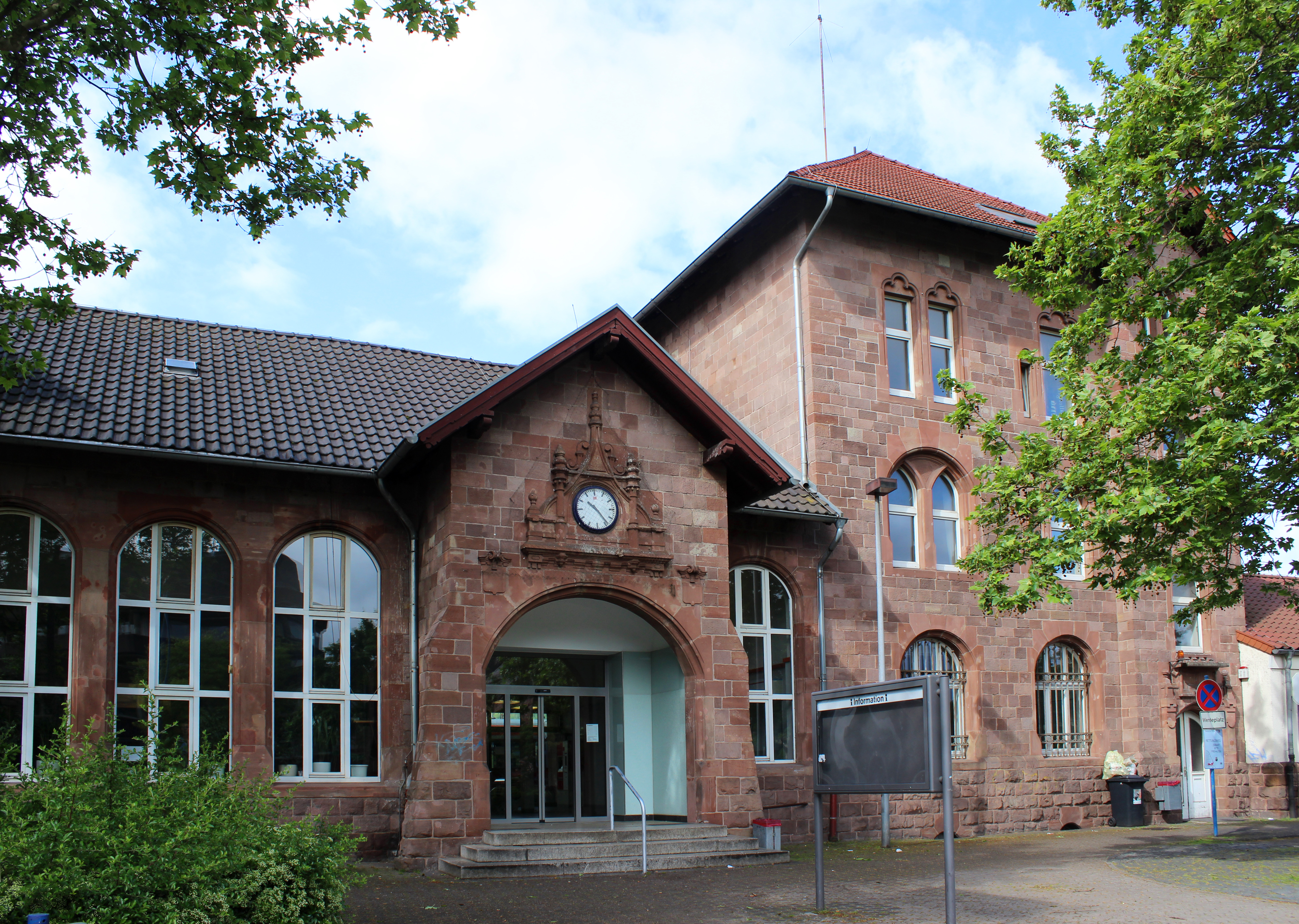
Dillingen (Saar) station

The nearest passenger and freight station is Dillingen (Saar) station, which opened in 1858. It is a railway junction on the Saar route of the German course (Saarbrücken-Trier-Koblenz) with branch of the Niedtalbahn into the French Thionville and Metz as well as the Primstalbahn. The railway line Dillingen-Primsweiler was originally planned to run on the right bank of the Prims via Diefflen. It should connect the railway line Trier-Hermeskeil-Wemmetsweiler and Trier-Saarbrücken by a cross-link. However, the railway administration decided on a route on the left side of the Prims. The construction work was begun in 1897 and completed until 1901. The Diefflen nearest train station was Nalbach. At the same time the Dillingen (Saar) station was extended, provided with a railway underpass and promoted from rank class II to rank class I, since Dillingen was now the most important node of the route Saarbrücken-Trier. In June 1980, the passenger traffic was set on the route through the Primstal. Freight continues to cross the line as needed. On the part of the premises of the Dillinger Hütte, which lies on the left side of the Dieffler district, there are six tracks that serve rolling mill 2. The neighboring stations of Dillingen are Saarlouis Hauptbahnhof and Beckingen.

=== Airports in the vicinity ===
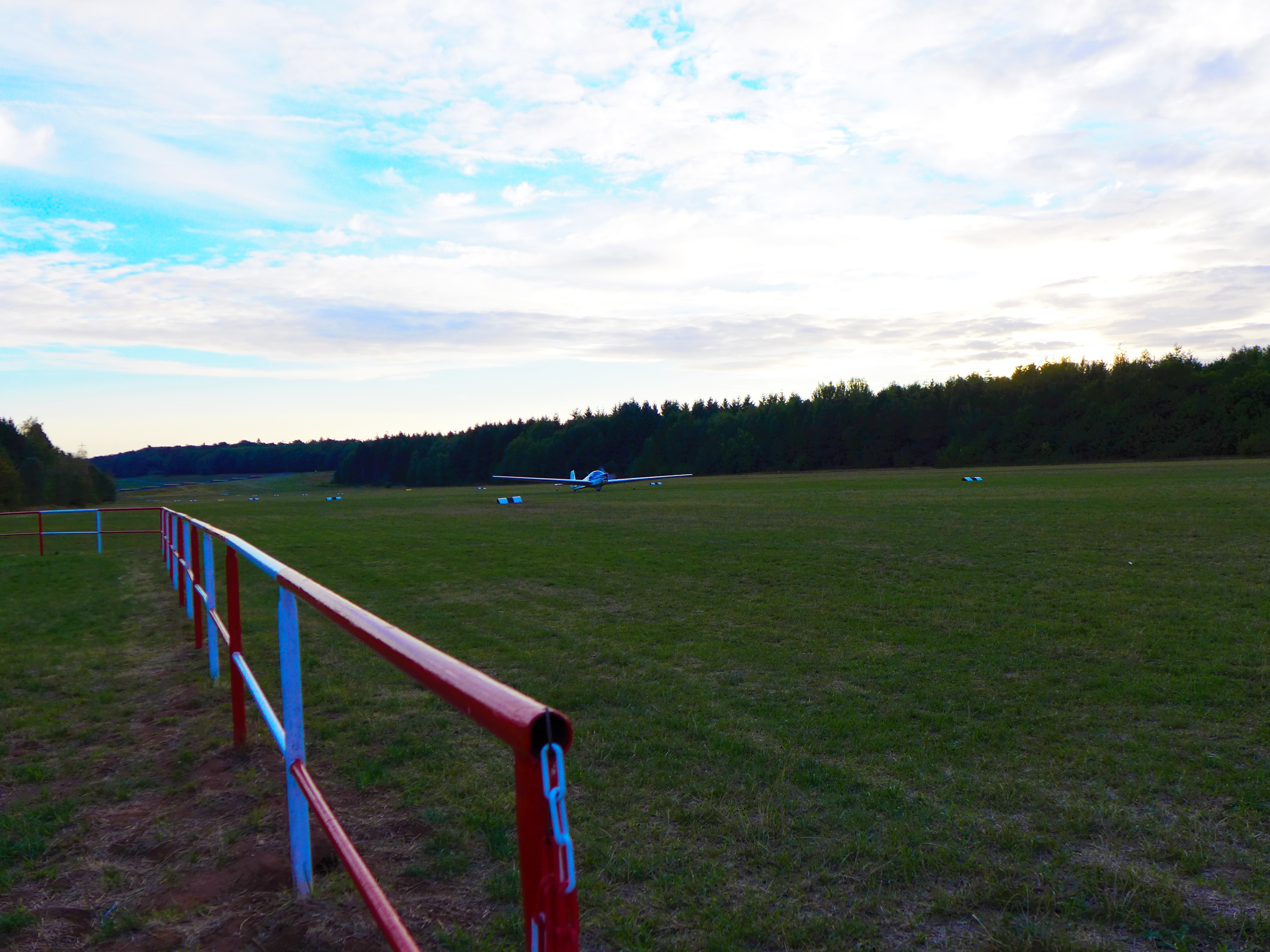
Diefflen, Glider-Flight-Area, plane in the landing process

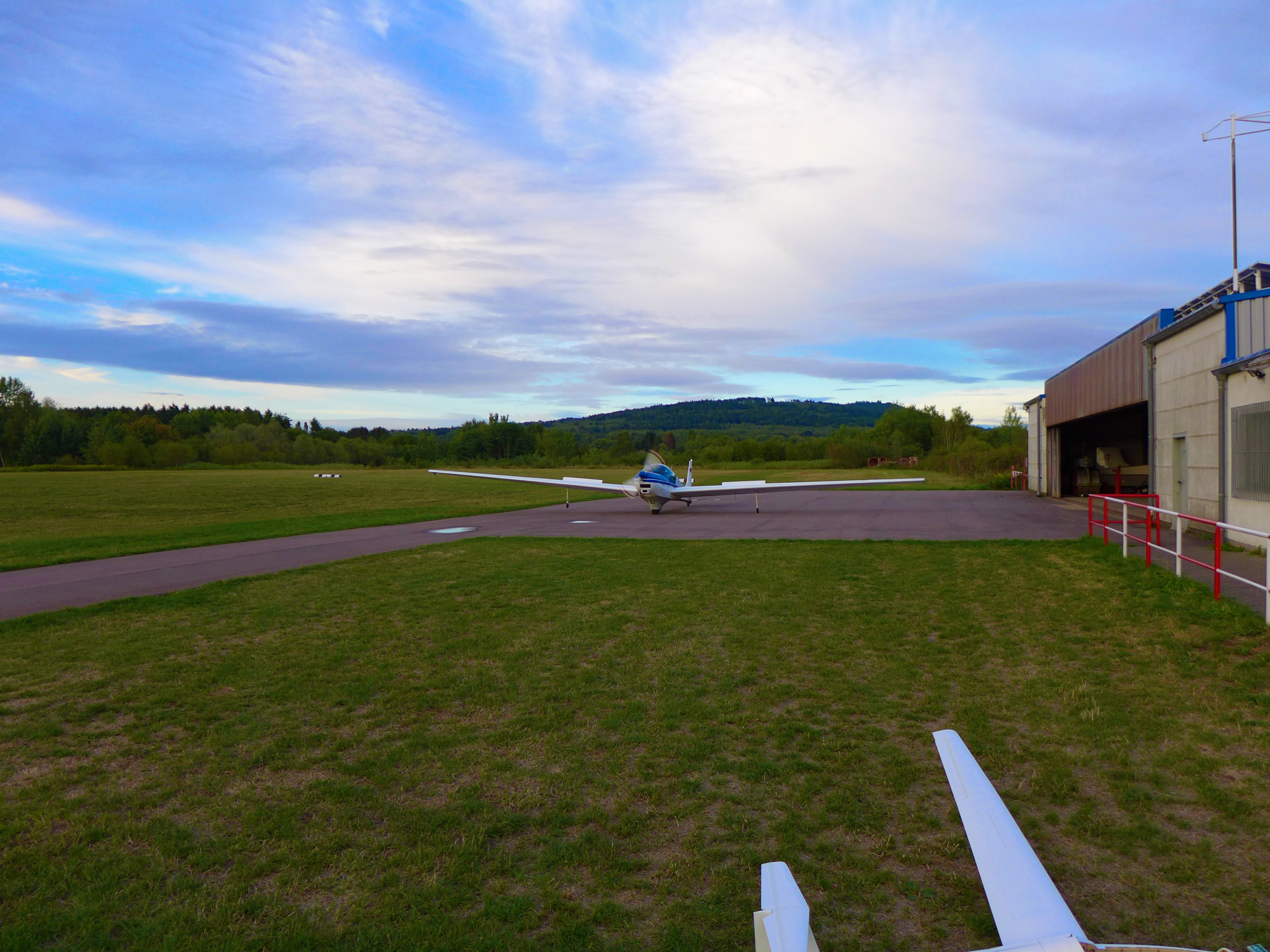
Diefflen, Glider-Flight-Area, Landed aircraft in front of the hangar

Within a radius of 100 km around Diefflen there are several airports:

- Saarbrücken Airport
- Luxembourg Airport
- Hahn Airport in Hunsrück
- Saarlouis-Düren as a traffic landing place for private machines
- Glider area and airfield for powered flight in Diefflen

The Luftsportclub Dillingen/Saar e.V. was founded in 1965. In 1971, the construction of today's airfield and aircraft hangar in Diefflen began. For the planning of the area a former sand and gravel mining area with 360.000 m³ filling material was filled. The resulting airfield has a length of 800 m and a width of 120 m. The runway has been extended for gliders in the direction of East in 2003. From 1988, the hangar was extended to include a training building.

== Education ==
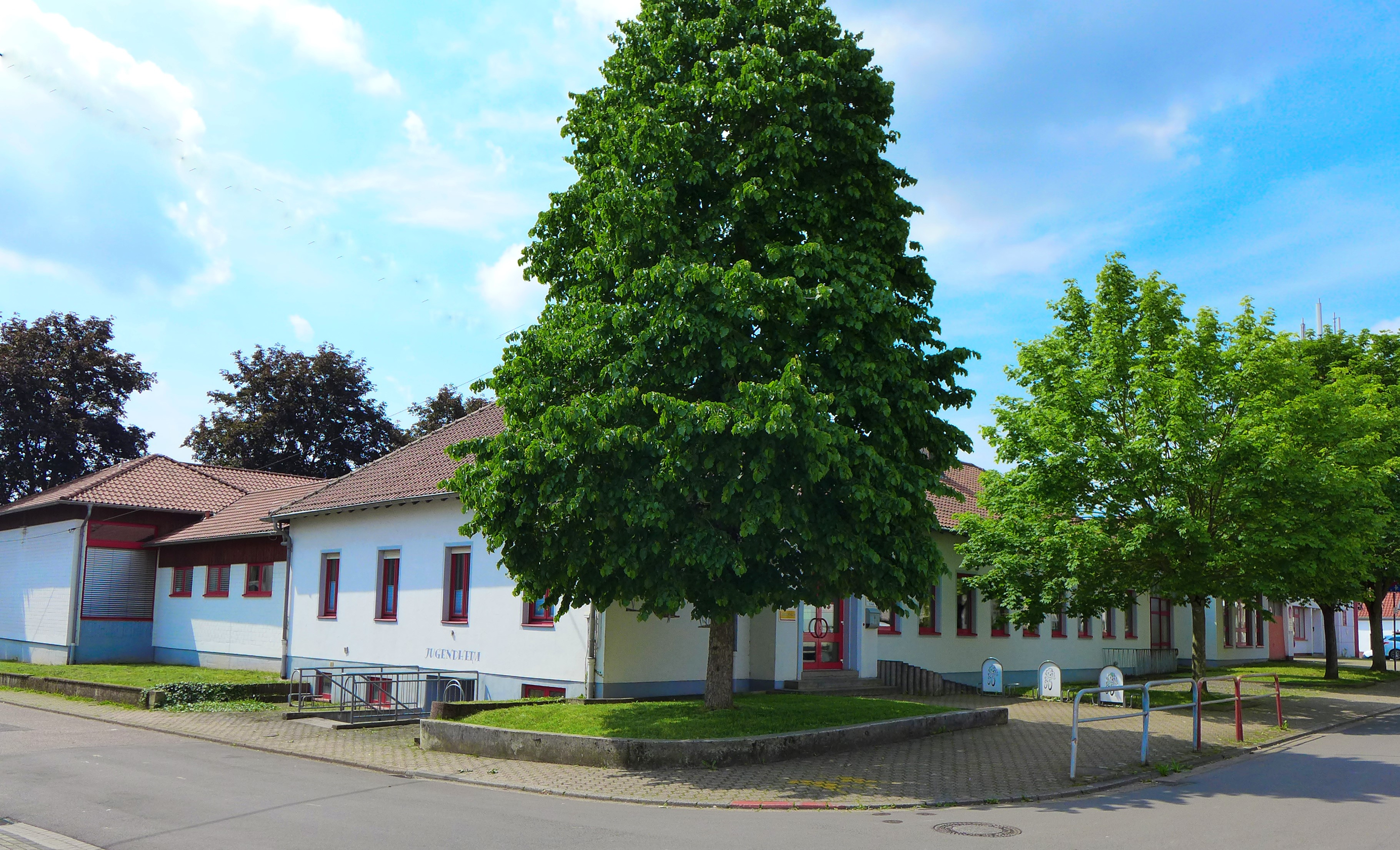
Diefflen, Kindergarten St. Joseph

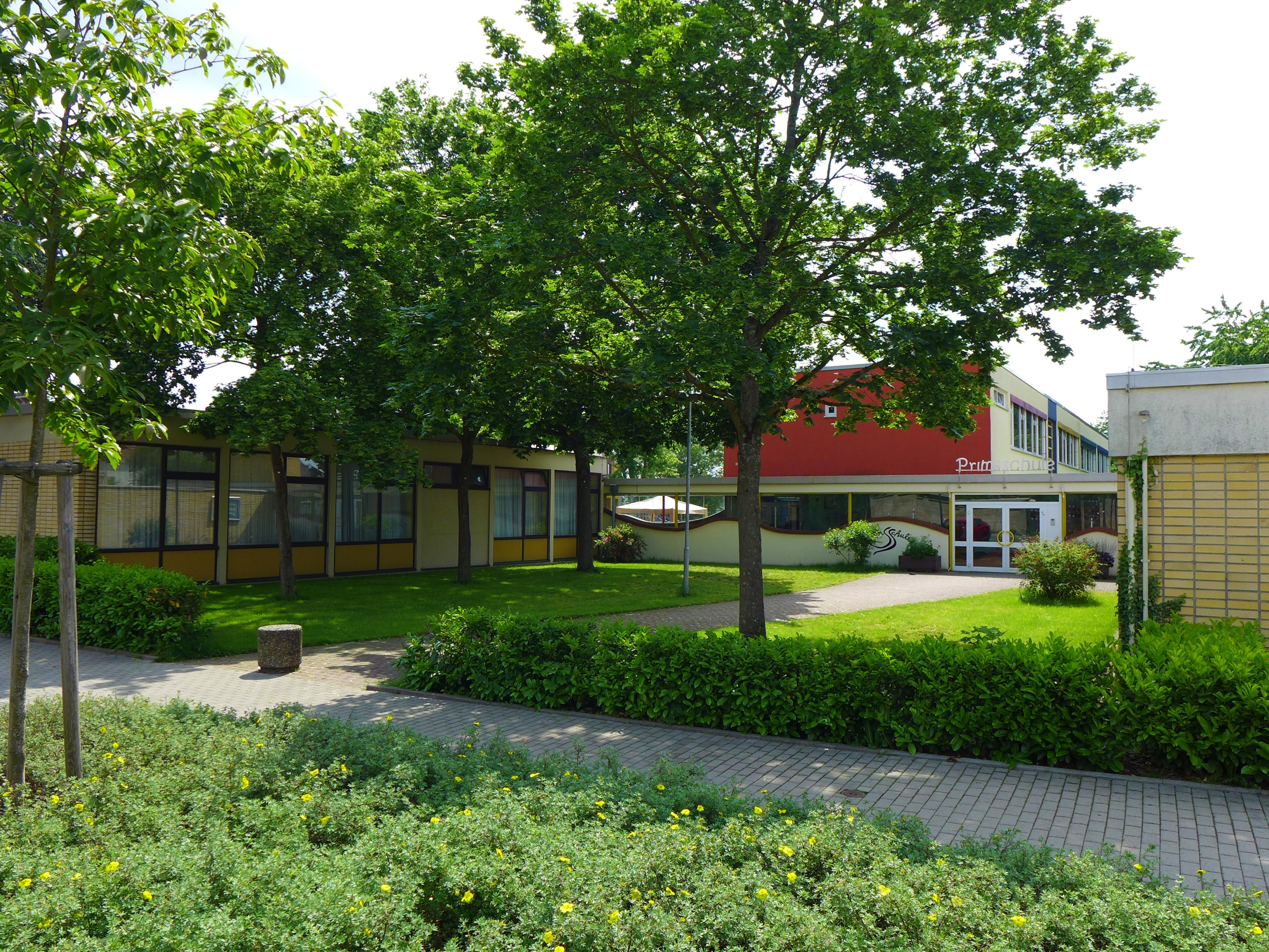
Diefflen, Primary School "Primsschule", Richard-Wagner-Straße

=== Kindergarten ===
There are two facilities available in Diefflen for the care of infants:

- "Kinderinsel Diefflen" (Kindergarten, day care and crèche)
- Catholic Kindergarten St. Joseph (Kindergarten and day care)

=== Primary school ===
In the years 1962/1963 the municipality of Diefflen built according to the plans of the architect Konrad Schmitz (Dillingen) a large new school building with two classroom wings, an administration building with student toilets, a covered break hall, a gymnasium with outdoor sports facilities and a courtyard with an Arboretum in Richard-Wagner-Straße. The school was given the name "Primsschule". Until 1983, the building was supplemented by a second, larger sports hall with auditorium.

In 1970 the Dieffler Hauptschule was disbanded and classes 5-9 were separated into the Odilienschule in Dillingen. The vacated rooms were immediately reused for a new purpose: Due to the strong increase in the number of students of Dillingen-Gymnasium (in 1973 to over 2100 students, thus one of the numerically strongest high schools in Germany) were the entire tract II of the new school building in the Richard-Wagner-Straße and the entire old building of the former elementary school in the Dillinger Straße on Babelsberg used as a Secondary school-Building.

Only with the construction of a branch building of the Gymnasium in Karcherstraße in Dillinger (and the acquisition of a wing of the former Protestant elementary school also in Karcherstraße), which was completed in 1982/1983, relocated the secondary school back to Dillingen. The school building on Babelsberg was demolished in the 1980s and The school building on Babelsberg was demolished in the 1980s and replaced by an extensive residential- and hotel-complex.

== Jewish cemetery ==
Jewish cemetery in Diefflen

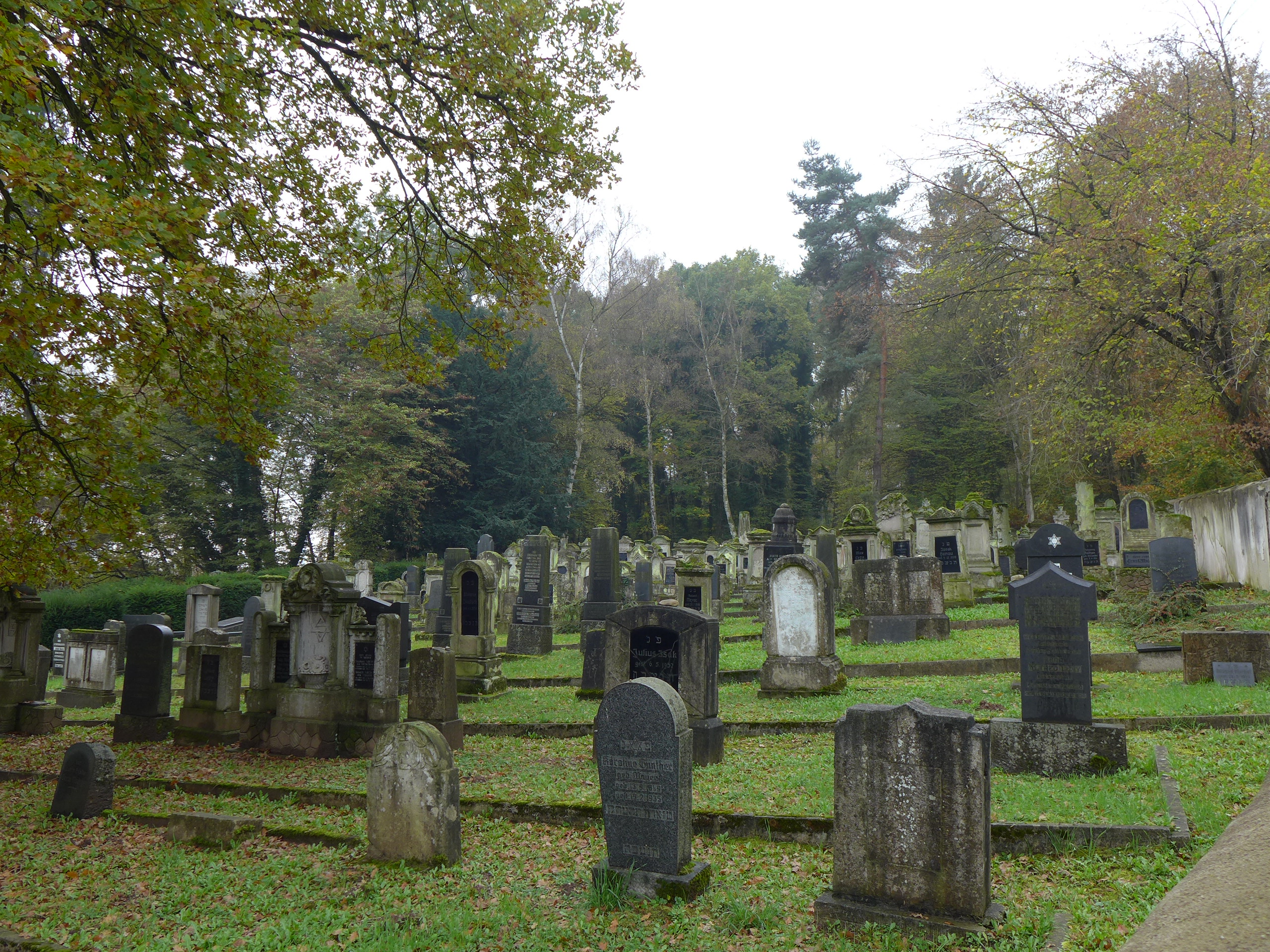

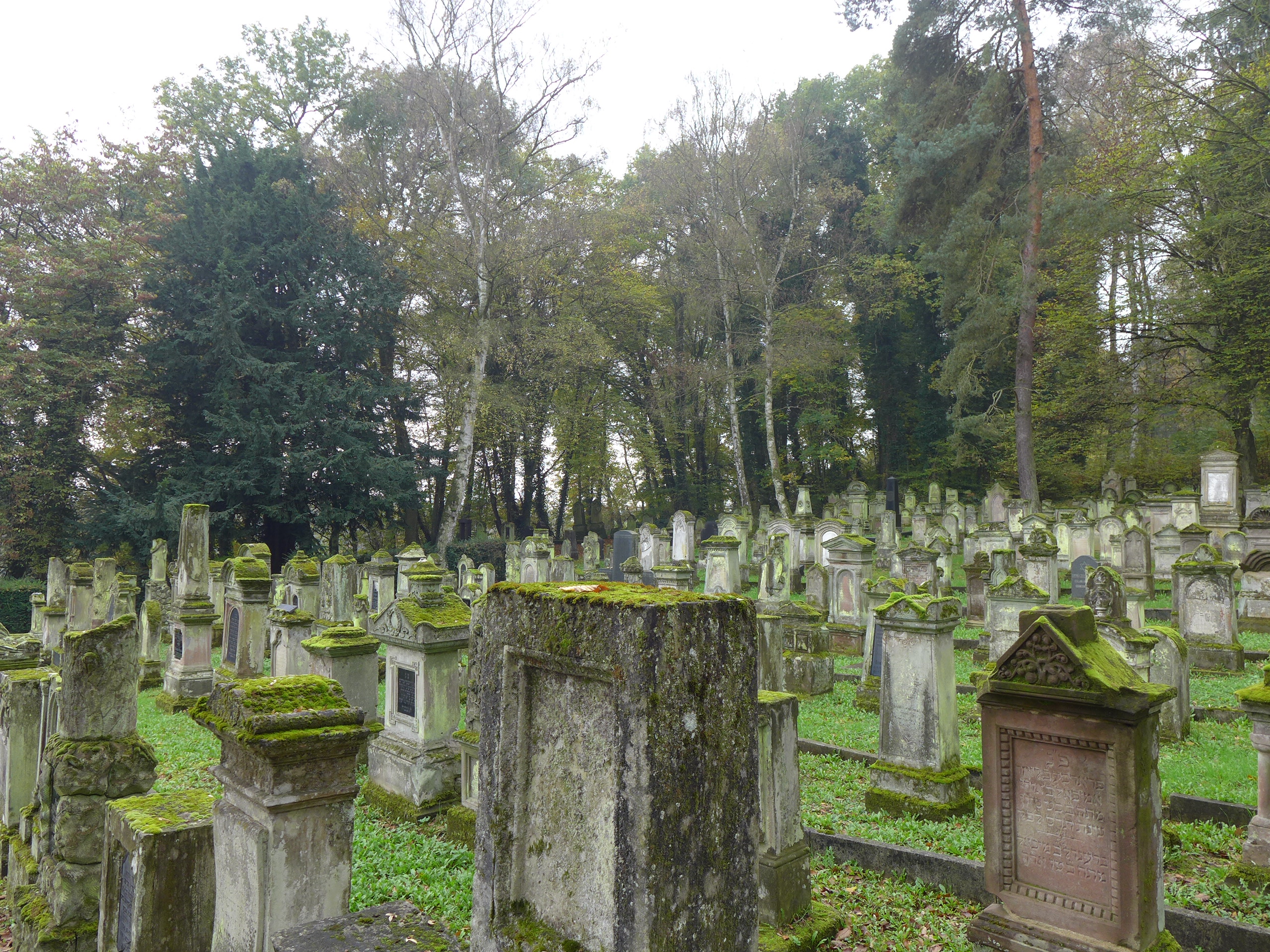

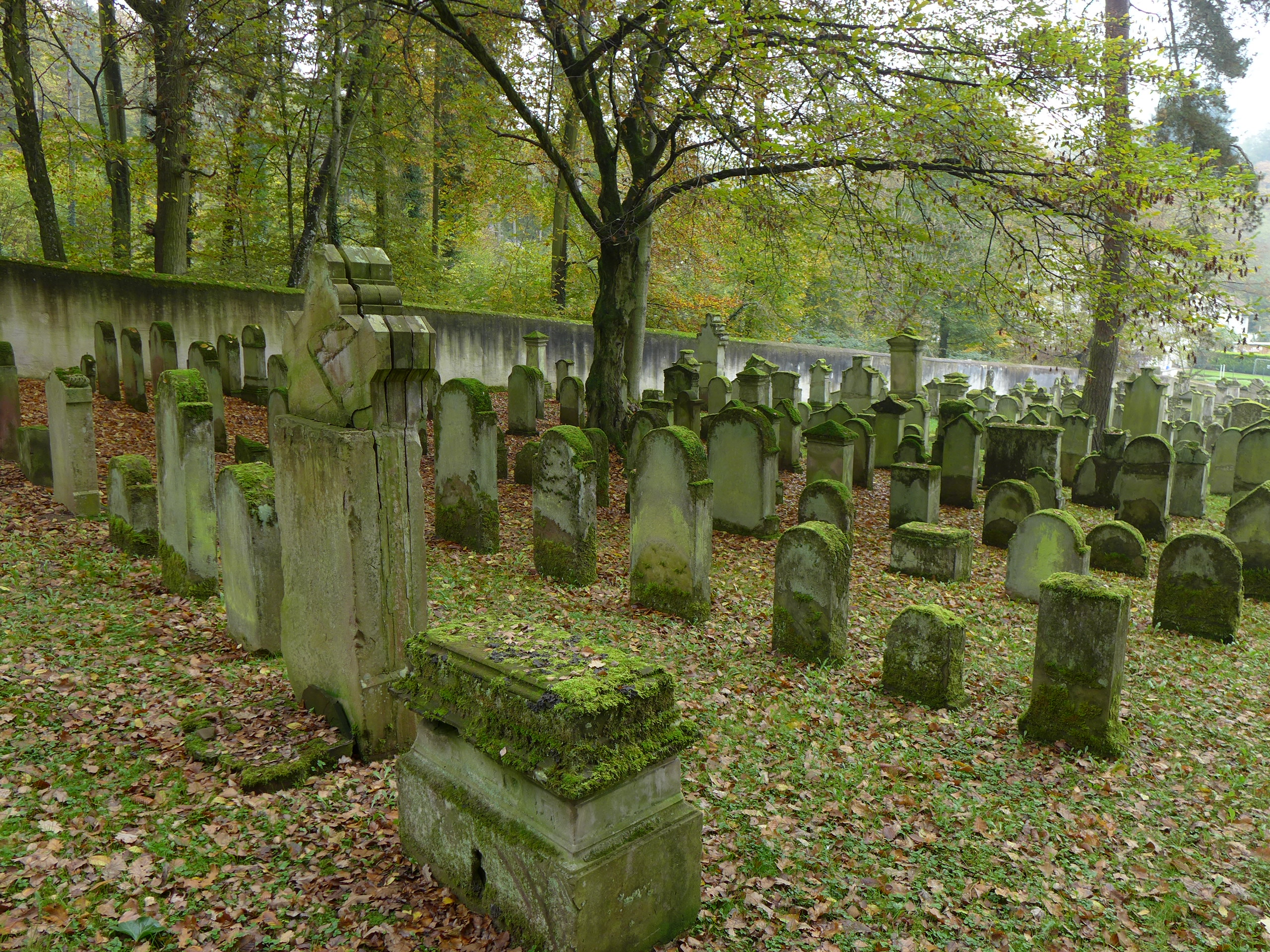

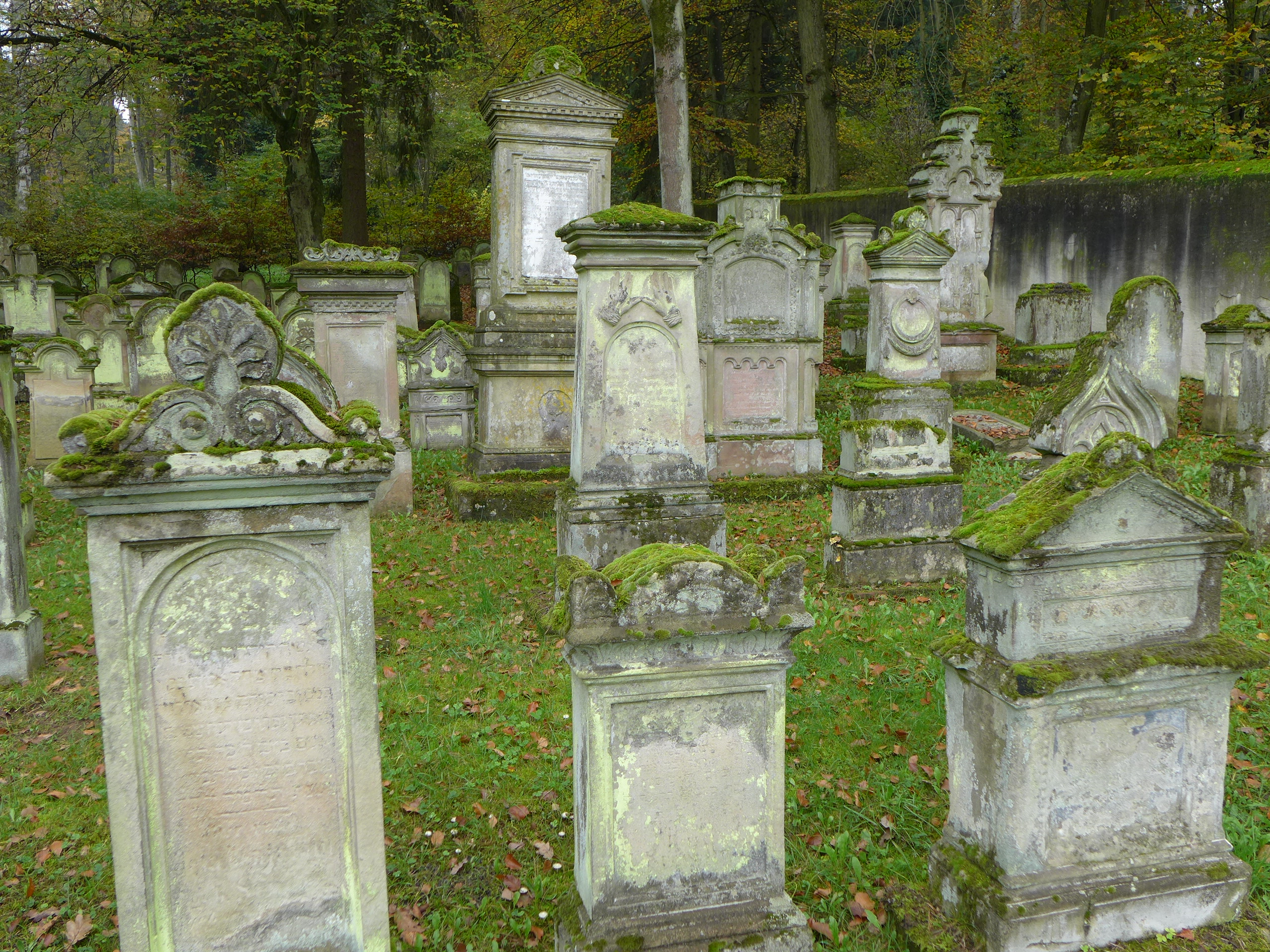

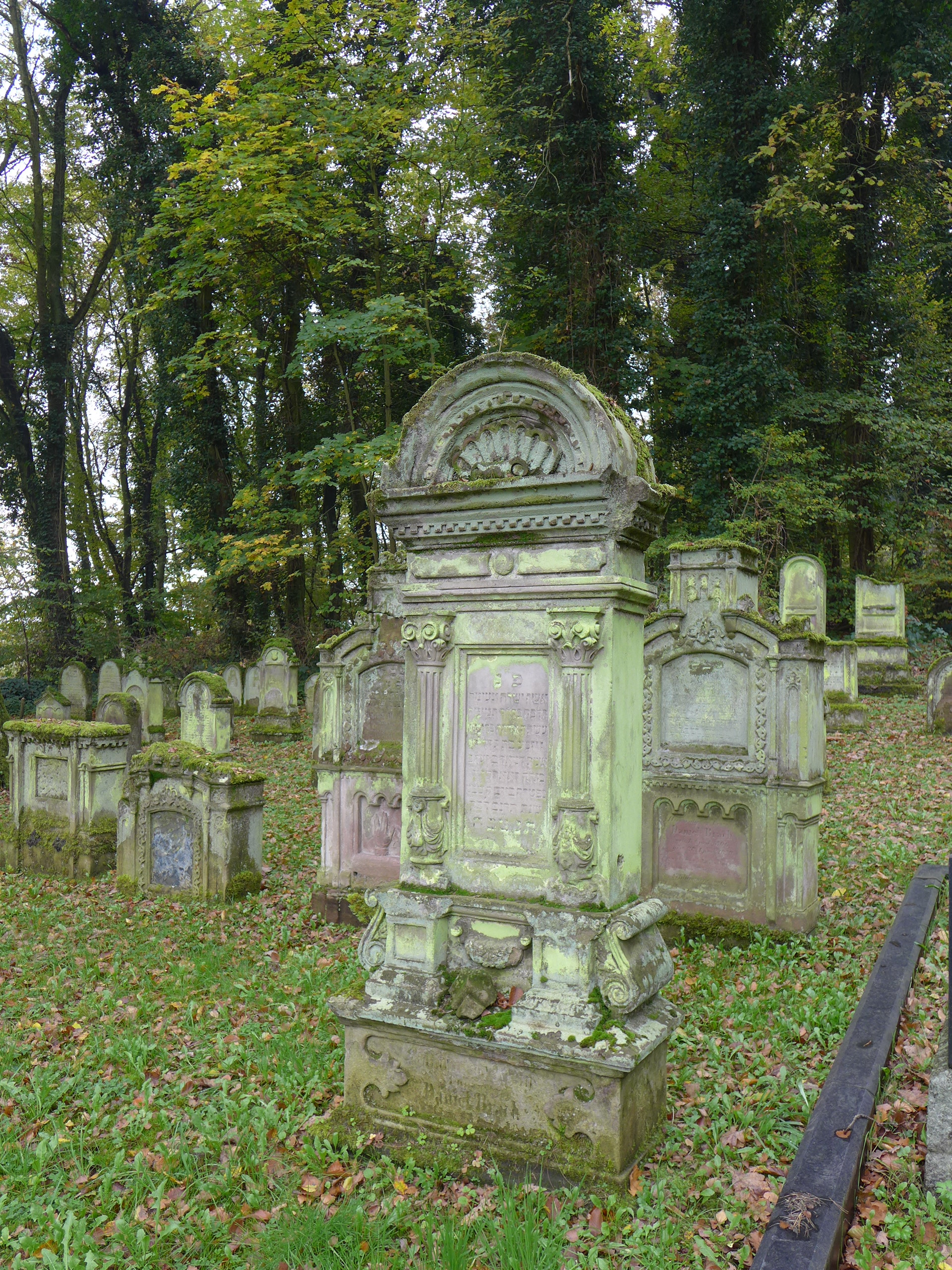

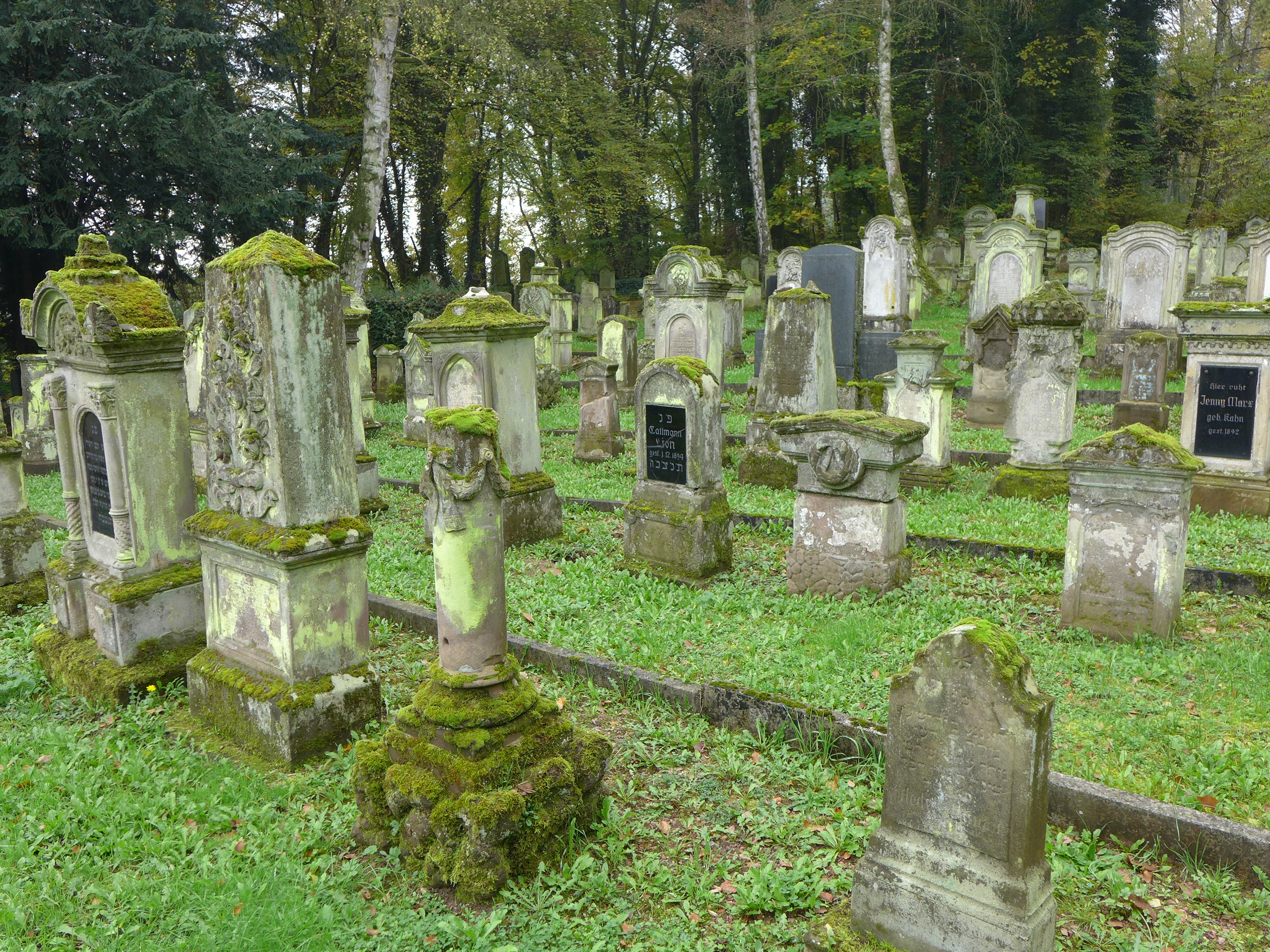

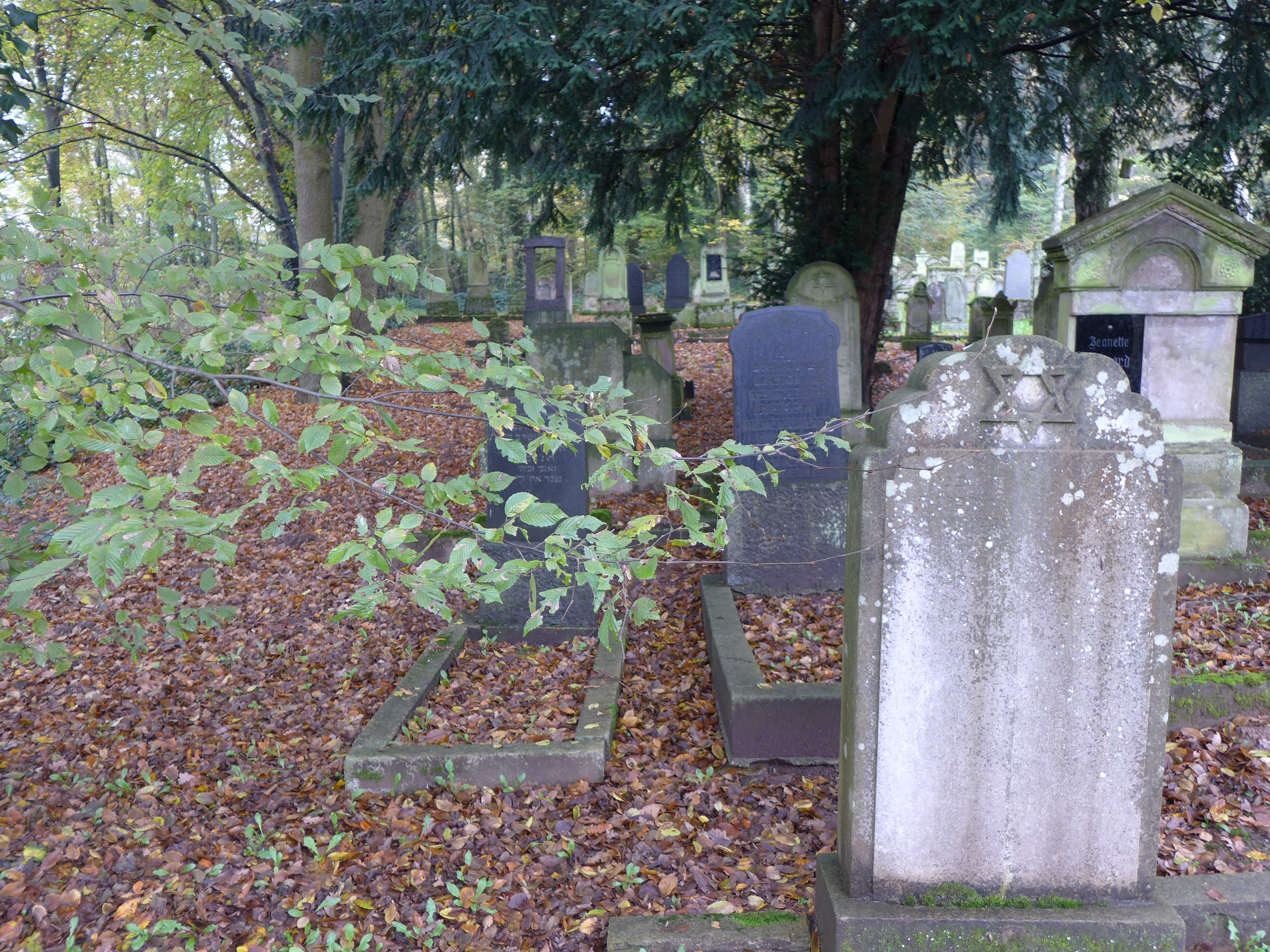

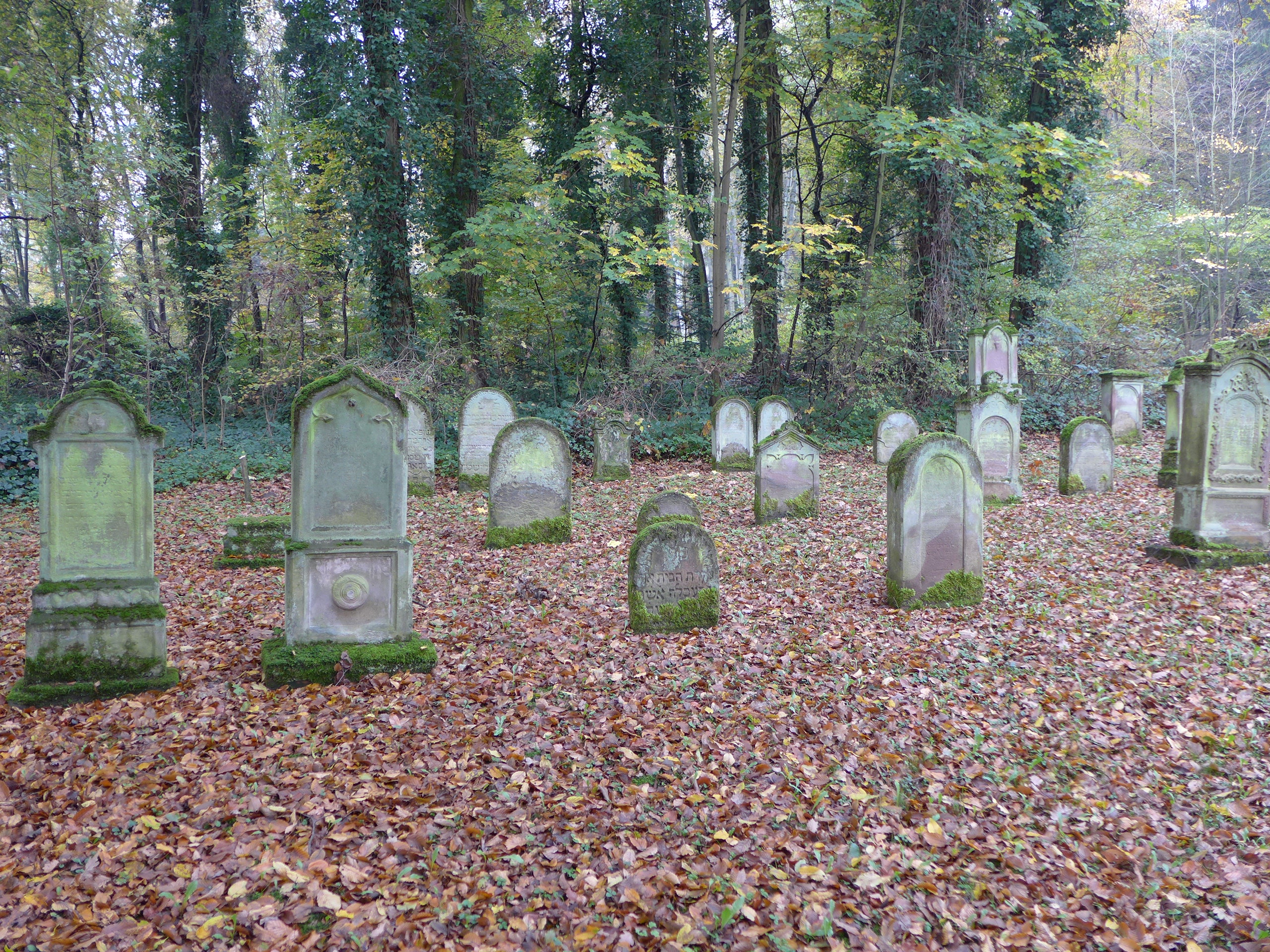

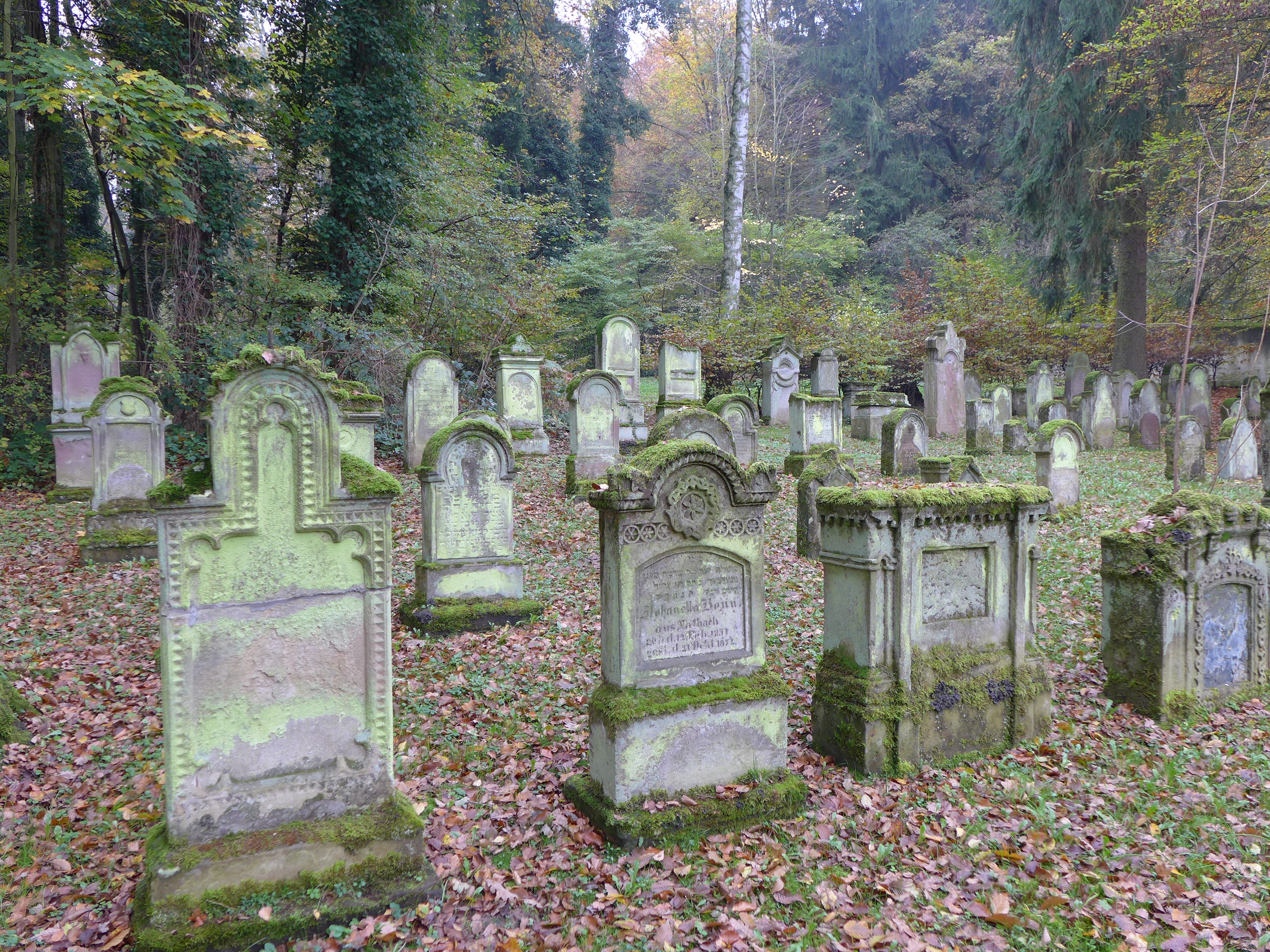

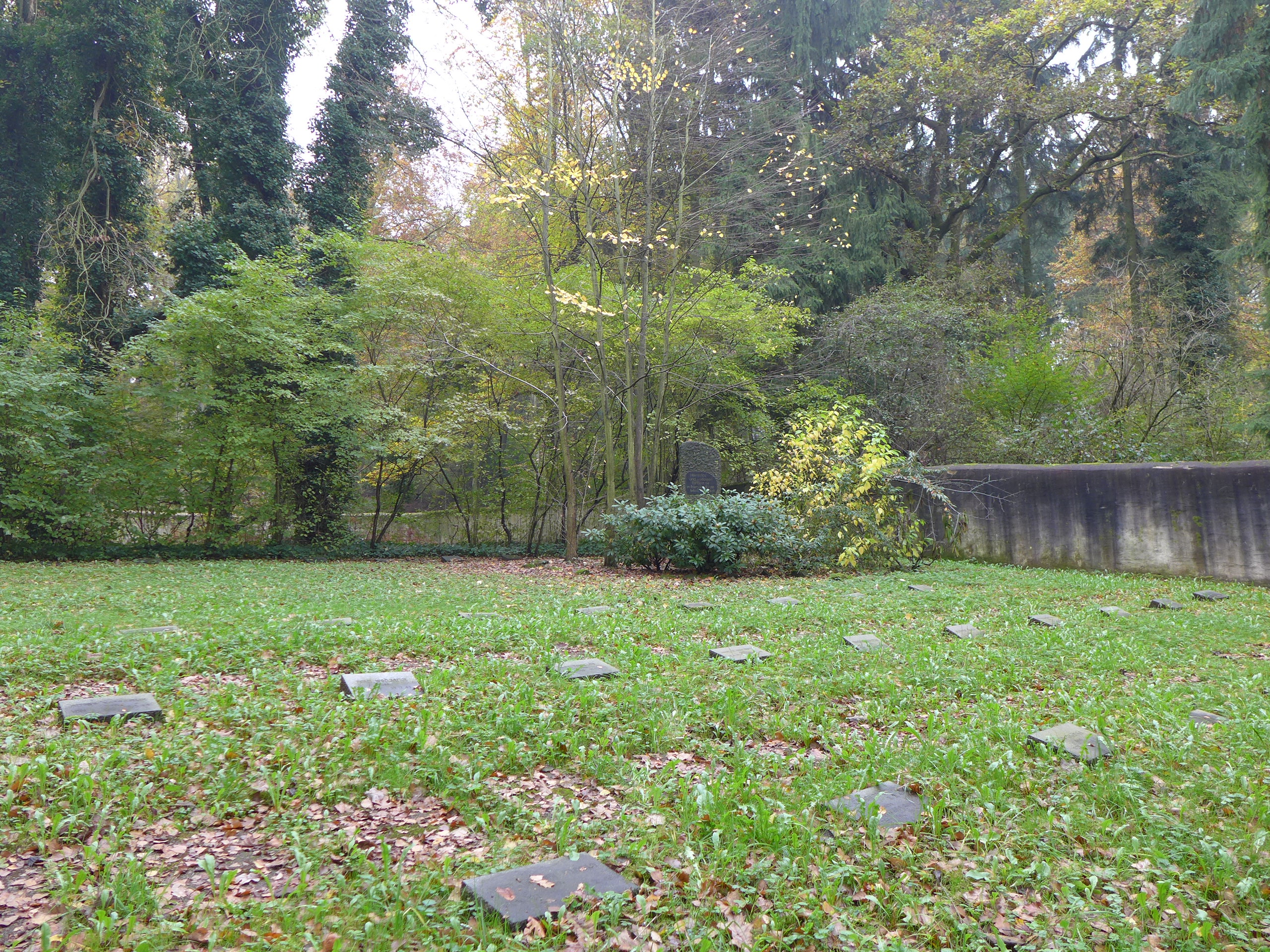
Nazi forced labor cemetery on the grounds of the Jewish cemetery

The Jewish cemetery, the largest Jewish cemetery in Saarland, lies on the edge of the Dillinger Hüttenwald, at the entrance to Diefflen. The cemetery is connected to the entrance of Diefflen, but is located entirely on the district of Dillingen, as the sidewalk edge of the street "Am Babelsberg" of Dieffler already belongs to the area of Dillingen whose residential development begins only about 2 km further west.

There are about 470 tombstones in the cemetery. In 1746, the Duchy-Lorraine official Charles Francois Dieudonné de Tailfumyr, Seigneur de Cussigny et Président à Mortier, had bought the domain of Dillingen. He was a baptized Jew and showed his Jewel-friendly policy by the 1755 granted permission to create a Jewish cemetery on the edge of the Dillinger Wald on the bann border of Diefflen. The initiative was based on the Jews Hayem, Zerf of Worms and Elias Reutlinger, citizens of Saarlouis, who had to pay an annual interest of 25 Lorraine Francs. In the same year 1755 the first deceased ones were buried.

In 1852 the cemetery was enlarged. In the Nazi era, it was destroyed in 1938. A restoration took place in 1946.

In 1964, a burial ground for more than 50 Polish and Russian forced laborers of the Nazi era was created in the back of the Jewish cemetery. The memorial stone bears the inscription "Homeless and abandoned, they found their last resting place in foreign soil."

== Sports facilities ==
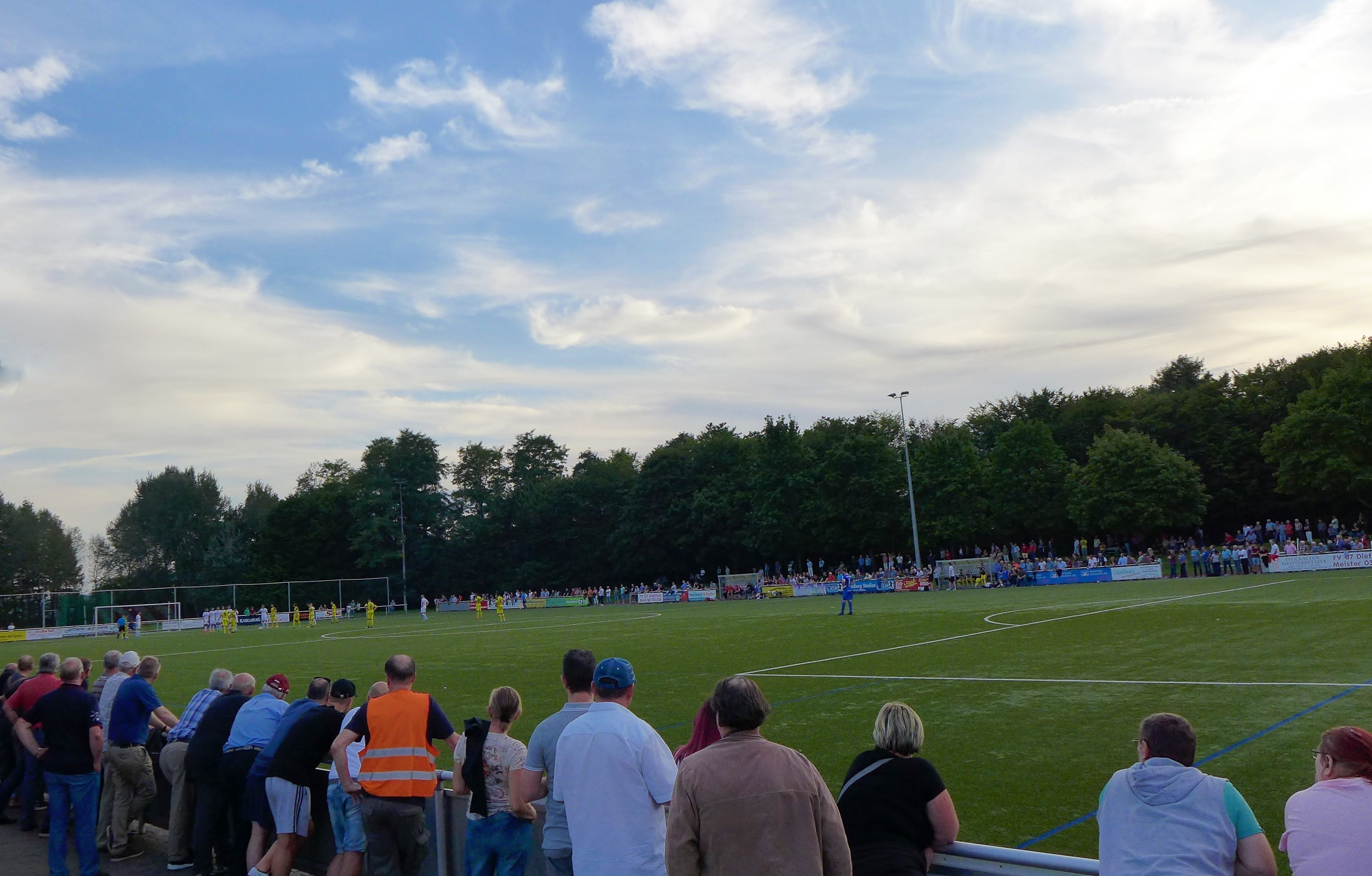
Diefflen, Sports ground

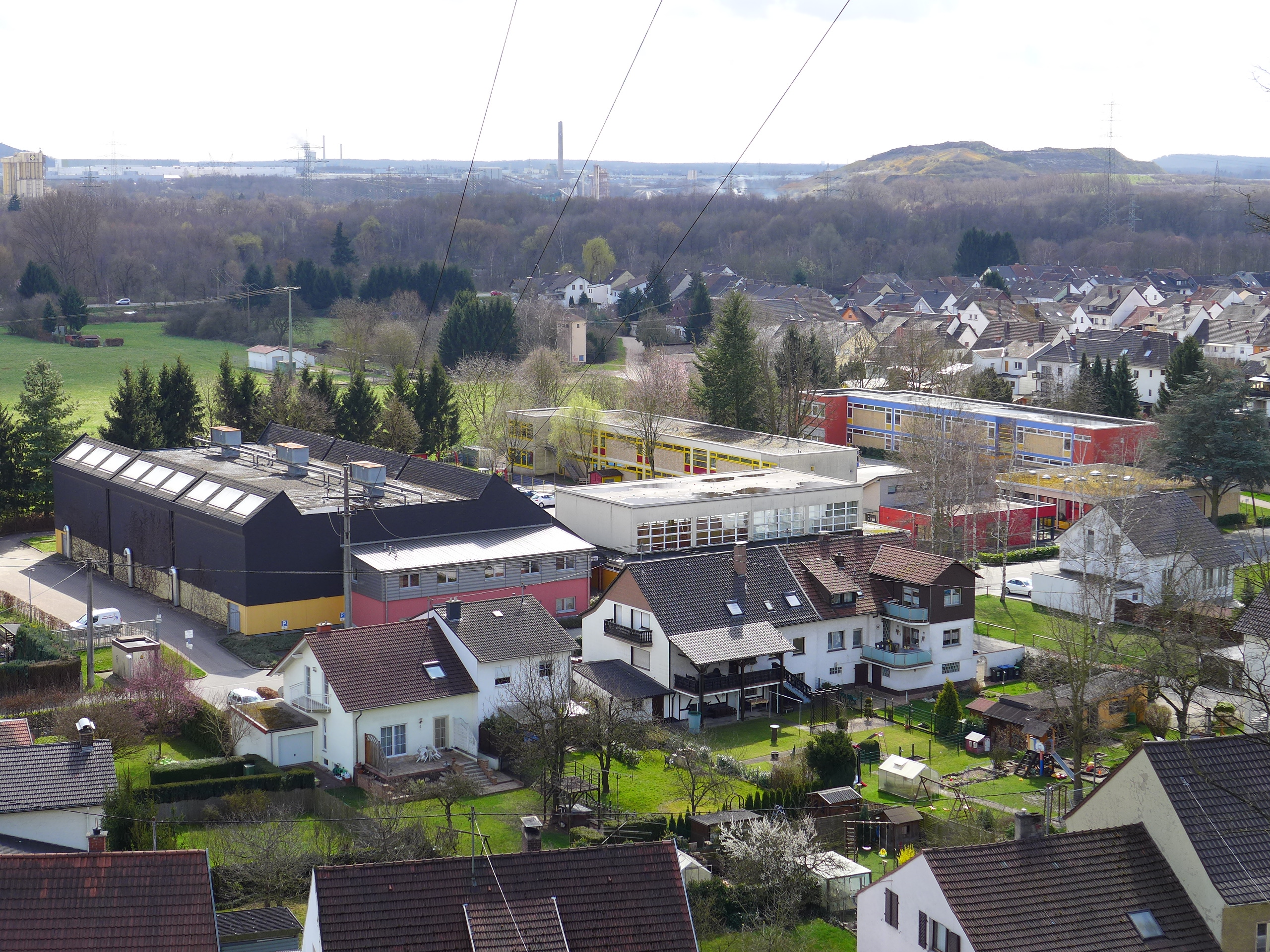
Diefflen, Primary School, Day-nursery, Sports halls

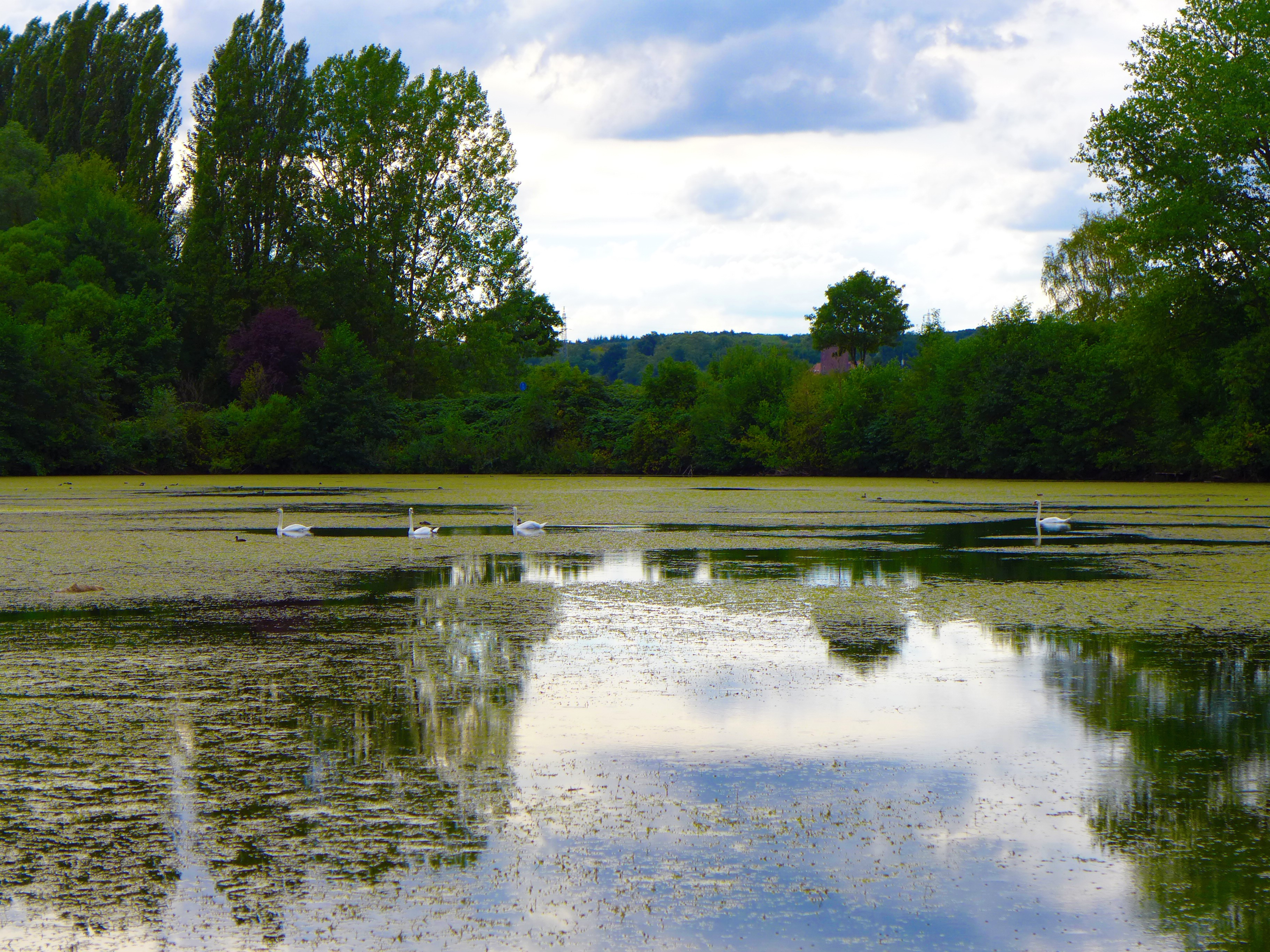
One of several fishing lakes

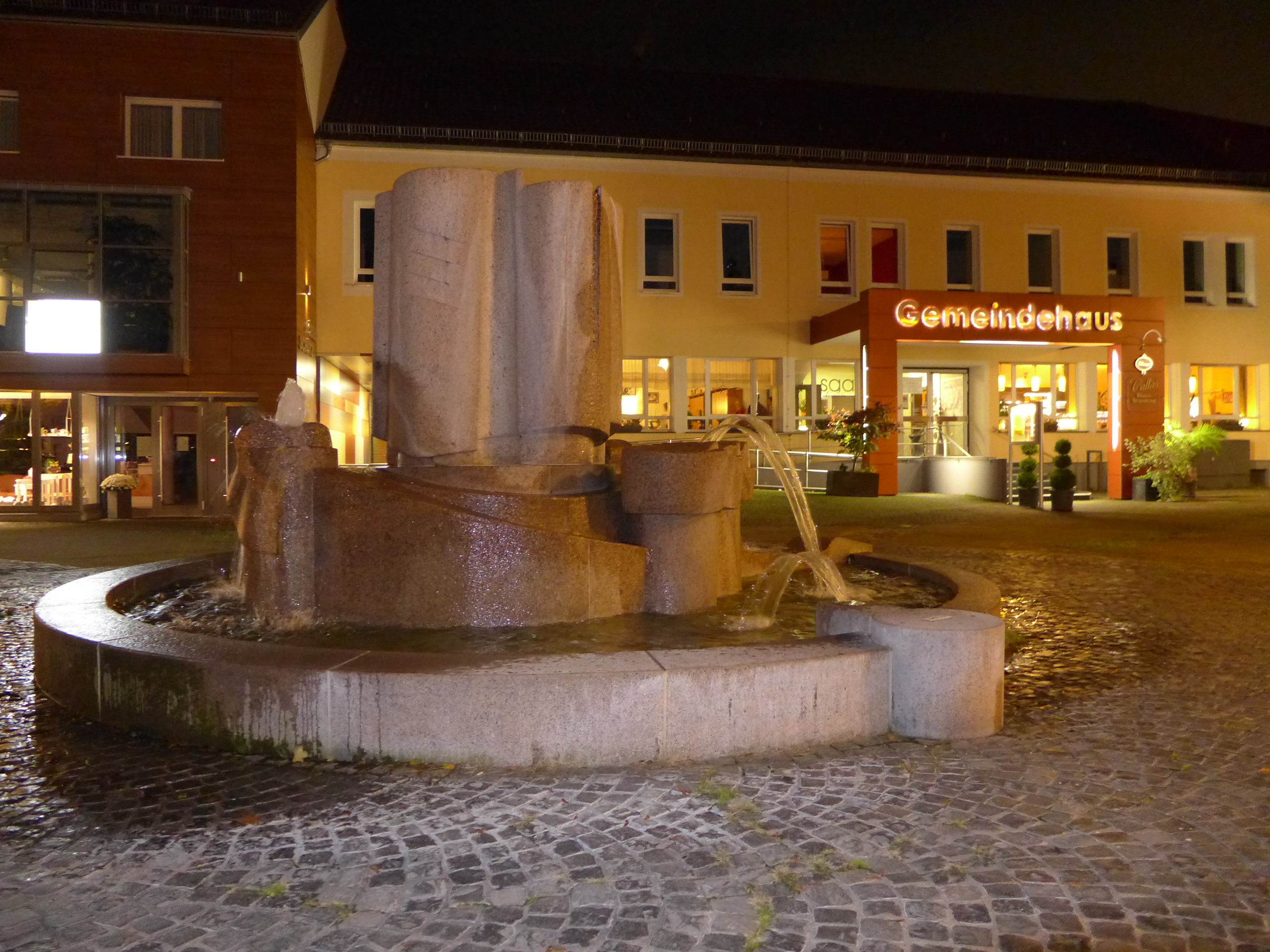
Gemeindehaus Diefflen
- several fishing ponds
- Bowling alleys in the town hall Diefflen
- Shooting range in the sports hall Diefflen
- Sports hall Diefflen
- Stadium Babelsberg
- Tennis court Diefflen
- Primary school Primsschule
- Glider area and airfield for powered flight

In the surroundings of Diefflen there are several swimming pools:

- Indoor swimming pool Dillingen (Distance: 3.8 km)
- Outdoor swimming pool Dillingen (Distance: 3,8 km)
- Outdoor swimming pool Saarwellingen (Distance: 6,3 km)
- Indoor swimming pool Saarlouis (Distance: 7,6 km)
- Outdoor swimming pool Saarlouis-Steinrausch (Distance: 7,8 km)
- Indoor swimming pool Beckingen (Distance: 7.9 km)
- Outdoor swimming pool Wallerfangen (Distance: 8,1 km)
- Outdoor swimming pool Schmelz (Distance: 11.7 km)
- Indoor swimming pool Lebach (Distance: 14.4 km)

== Associations ==
More than 100 clubs are currently active in the city of Dillingen. At traditional clubs in Diefflen are the men's choir Diefflen (founded in 1874), the musical association "Piano-Forte" (founded in 1908), the church choir St. Cäcilia Diefflen (founded in 1900), the gymnastics club Diefflen (founded in 1891), the football club FV 07 Diefflen (founded in 1907) as well as the local association of the German Red Cross (founded in 1925) to call.

== Religion ==
Diefflen has a catholic parish church: Saint Joseph and St. Wendelin. The first neo-gothic church of the architect Wilhelm Hector (1855–1918) was built in the years 1899-1900. After severe damage in World War II, the building was extensively extended in the years 1948-1950 according to the plans of the architects Alois Havener (Saarlouis) and Rudolf Güthler (Saarbrücken) and redesigned in the romanizing or late-antiquing abstraction-historicism.

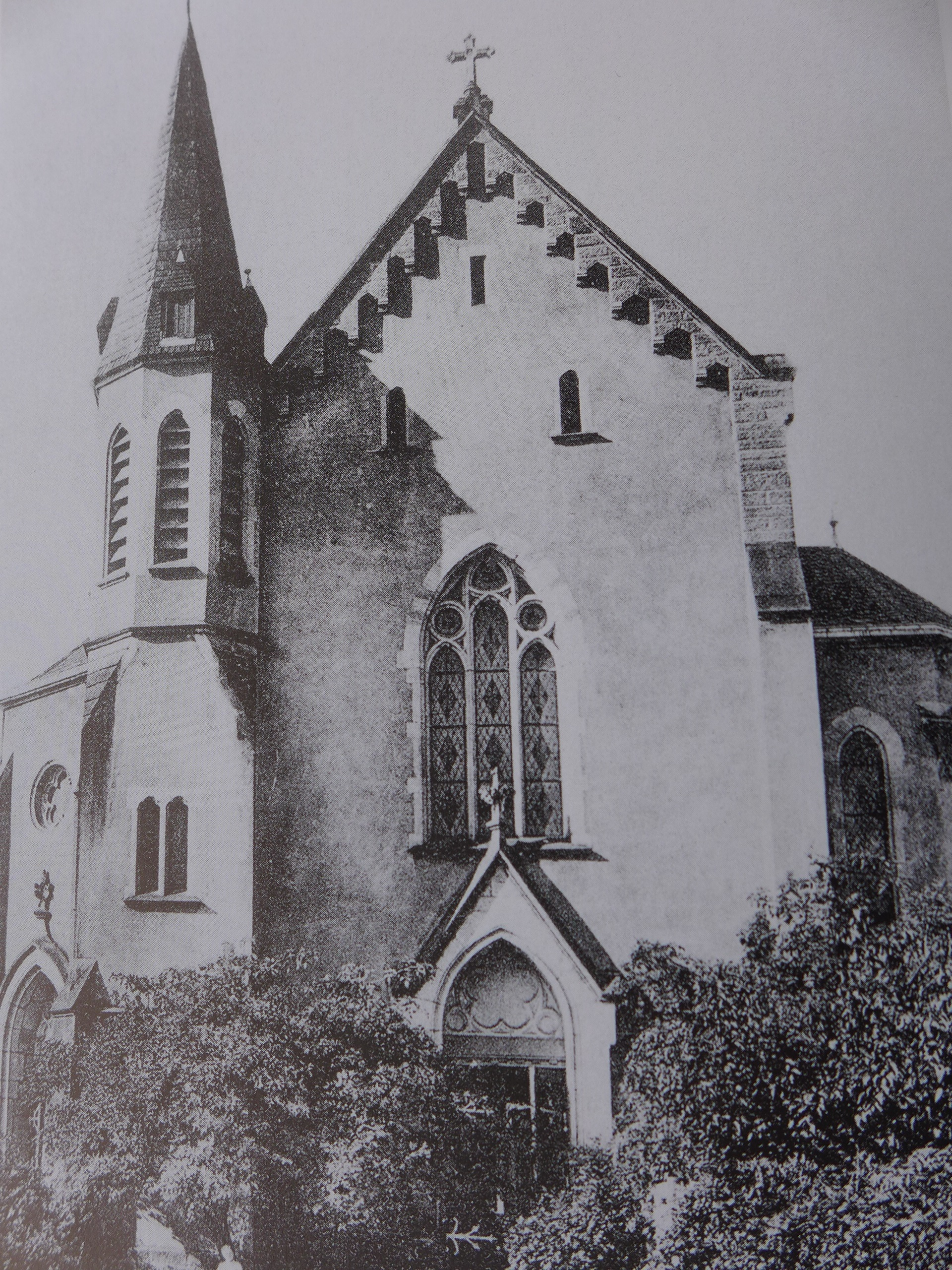
St. Joseph and St. Wendelin, around 1900

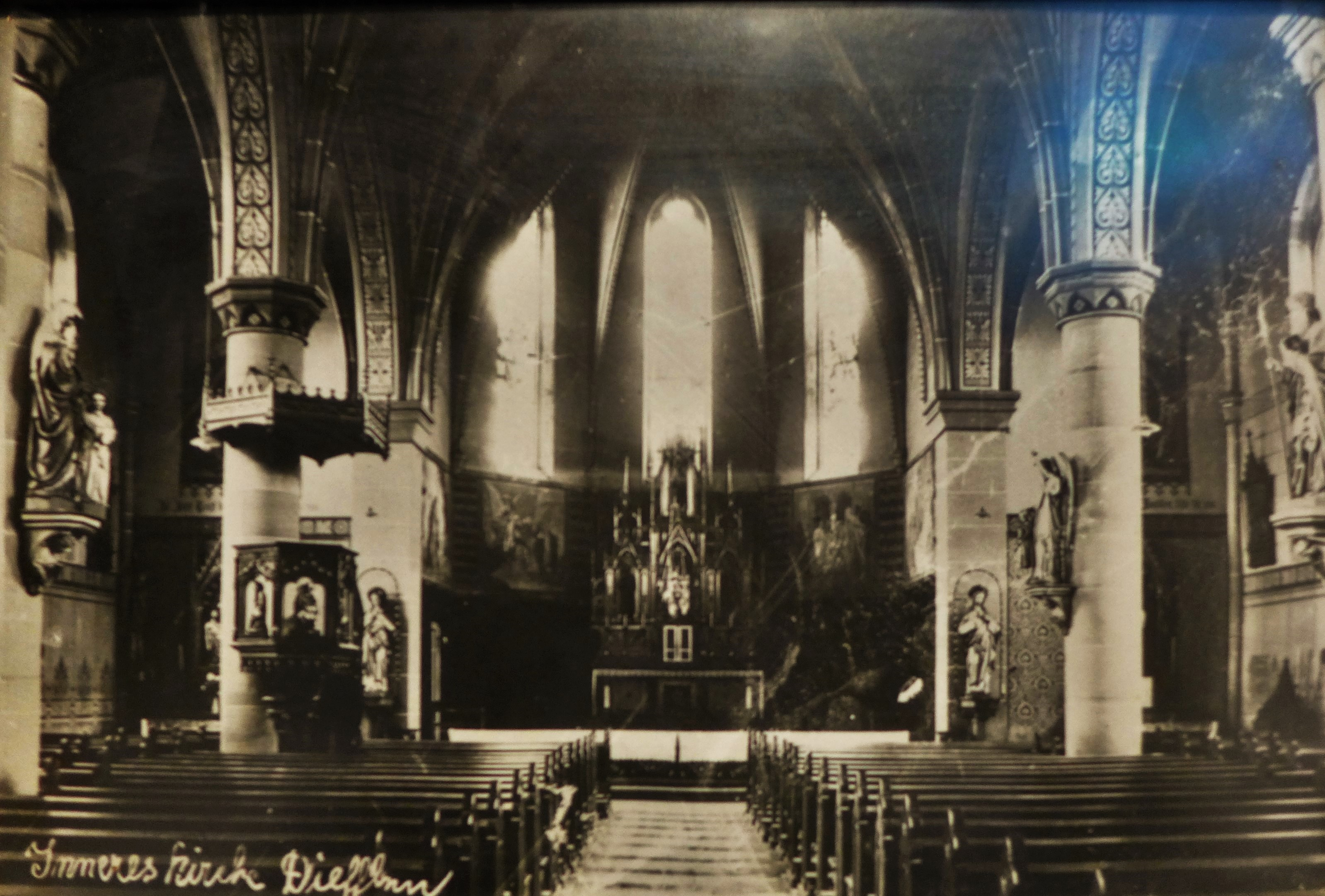
St. Joseph and St. Wendelin, Interior before the Second World War

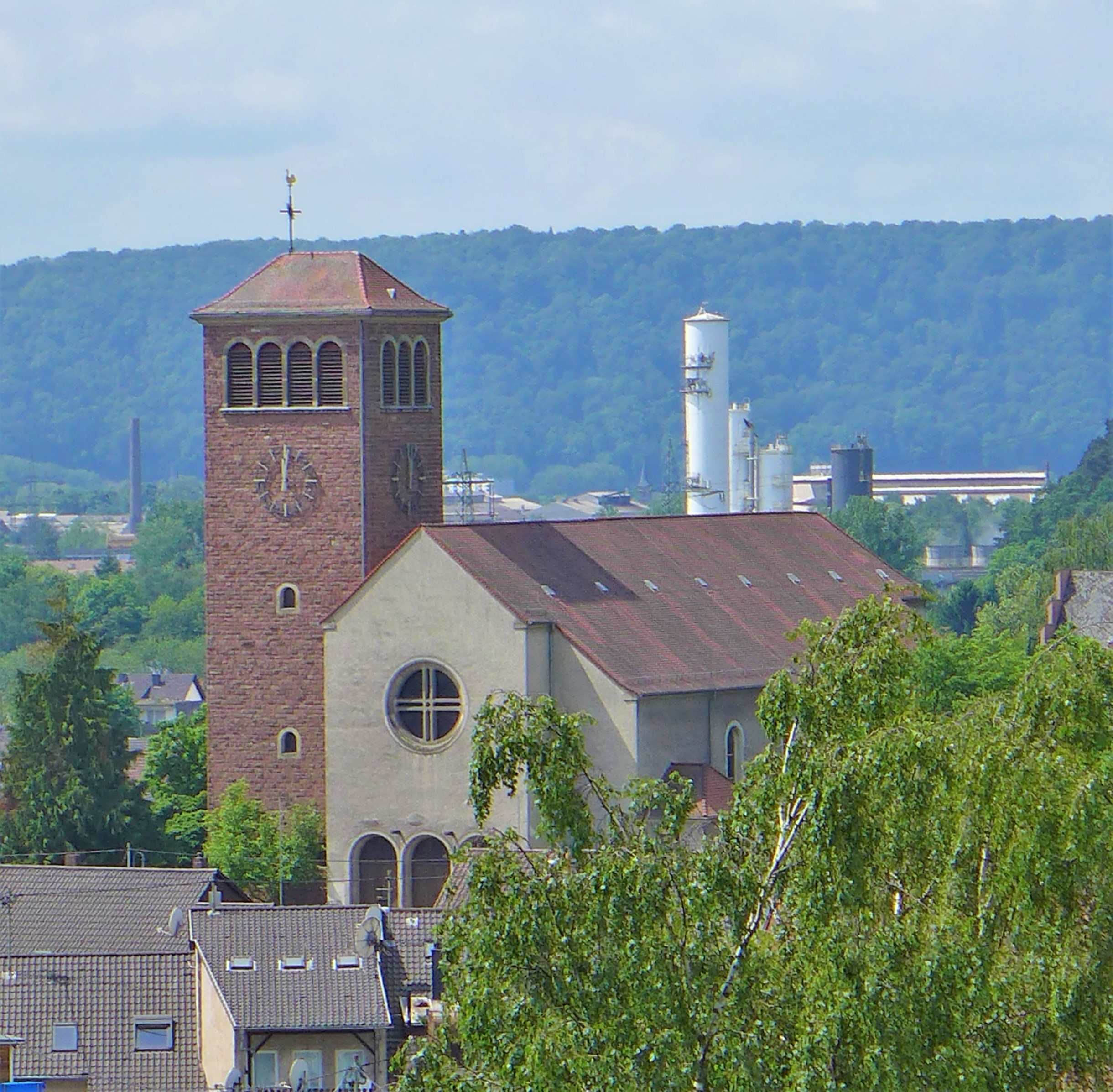
St. Joseph and St. Wendelin, after the reconstruction of the post-war period

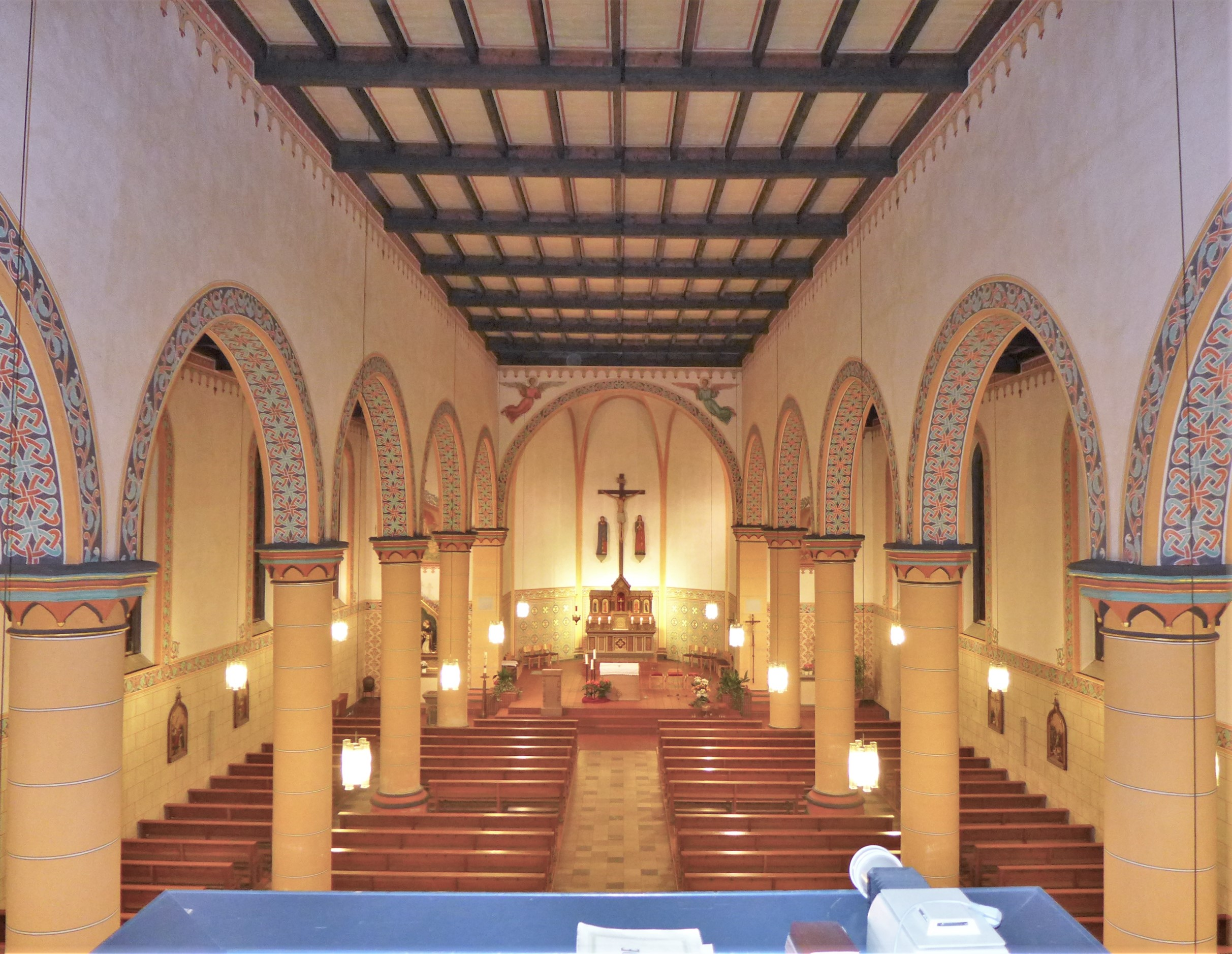
St. Joseph and St. Wendelin, Interior today

Diefflen belongs to the Roman Catholic Diocese of Trier (Ecclesiastical province of Cologne) and to the Protestant Church in the Rhineland. The assignment to the Catholic province of Trier is still based on the Roman province division of Emperor Diocletian. In 1891, when the old Romanesque church of Pachten was demolished to build a neo-Gothic one, the late antique so-called "Ursusstein" with a Christogram ☧ was found. This proves that already in the 3rd or 4th century AD, people of Christian faith lived in the immediate vicinity of Diefflen. Whether Christianity perished completely during the turmoil of Migration Period in the surrounding area remains unclear. The episcopal centers Trier and Metz survived the Germanic conquests. From here, in the early Franconian period, the Christianization of the pagan population was tackled.

Of particular importance for the Christianization of the Nalbach-Valley with Diefflen is certainly the foundation of the Franconian nobles and deacon of the Verdun Cathedral, Adalgisel Grimo. He determined on December 30, 634 in his will that his possessions in the place Tholey together with the built there by him "loca sanctorum" to the Roman Catholic Diocese of Verdun, which at the time was headed by Bishop Paul, should fall. This foundation became the focal point of a busy missionary activity in the area.

Since its medieval founding Diefflen formed with the neighboring village of Nalbach until 1858 not only a political, but also until 1919 a church unity. The parish church St. Peter and Paul in Nalbach is the mother church of the surrounding six villages of the Nalbach-Valley: Diefflen, Piesbach, Bettstadt, Bilsdorf and Körprich.

Nalbach, which was mentioned as a parish for the first time in the 11th century, belonged in the Middle Ages to the archdeaconry St. Mauritius Tholey and the deanery and land chapter Merzig in the then Archdiocese of Trier. The archdeaconry Tholey existed until the abolition of the abbey by the troops of the French Revolution in 1793.

By a gift of the Archbishop of Trier Eberhard from 1048, a letter of protection of Henry III from 1098 and a letter of protection of Pope Adrian IV of 1154 and by acquiring the rights of the knights of Nalbach in 1331 the Simeonstift of Trier had in the Nalbach-Valley the basic jurisdiction, the tax collection law and the right to fill the vicarages. The ancestral parish of the Nalbach-Valley, St. Peter and Paul, whose patronal feast presumably refers to the local fishermen at the Prims (Saint Peter as a fishing patron), is mentioned in the list of parishes from the middle of the 12th century committed to the pilgrimage to the abbey of Mettlach.

The Reformation could not be spread by the catholic rule of the Electorate of Trier and the Duchy of Lorraine. In the neighbor-village Diefflen, Saarwellingen, which was under the sovereignty of the Lords of Kriechingen, the Reformation was enforced. However, with the reunification policy of King Louis XIV of France and the construction of the fortress of Saarlouis, here too, as well as in Schwalbach, Reisweiler, Eiweiler and Überherrn, the only superficially Protestantised church ended.

Until Industrial Revolution in the 19th century, there were hardly any people of Protestant denomination in the immediate vicinity of Diefflen. Only with the construction of a Protestant church in Dillingen in the years 1902-1903 exists in today's urban area of Dillingen a Protestant church.
