= Nalbach =

- Municipality
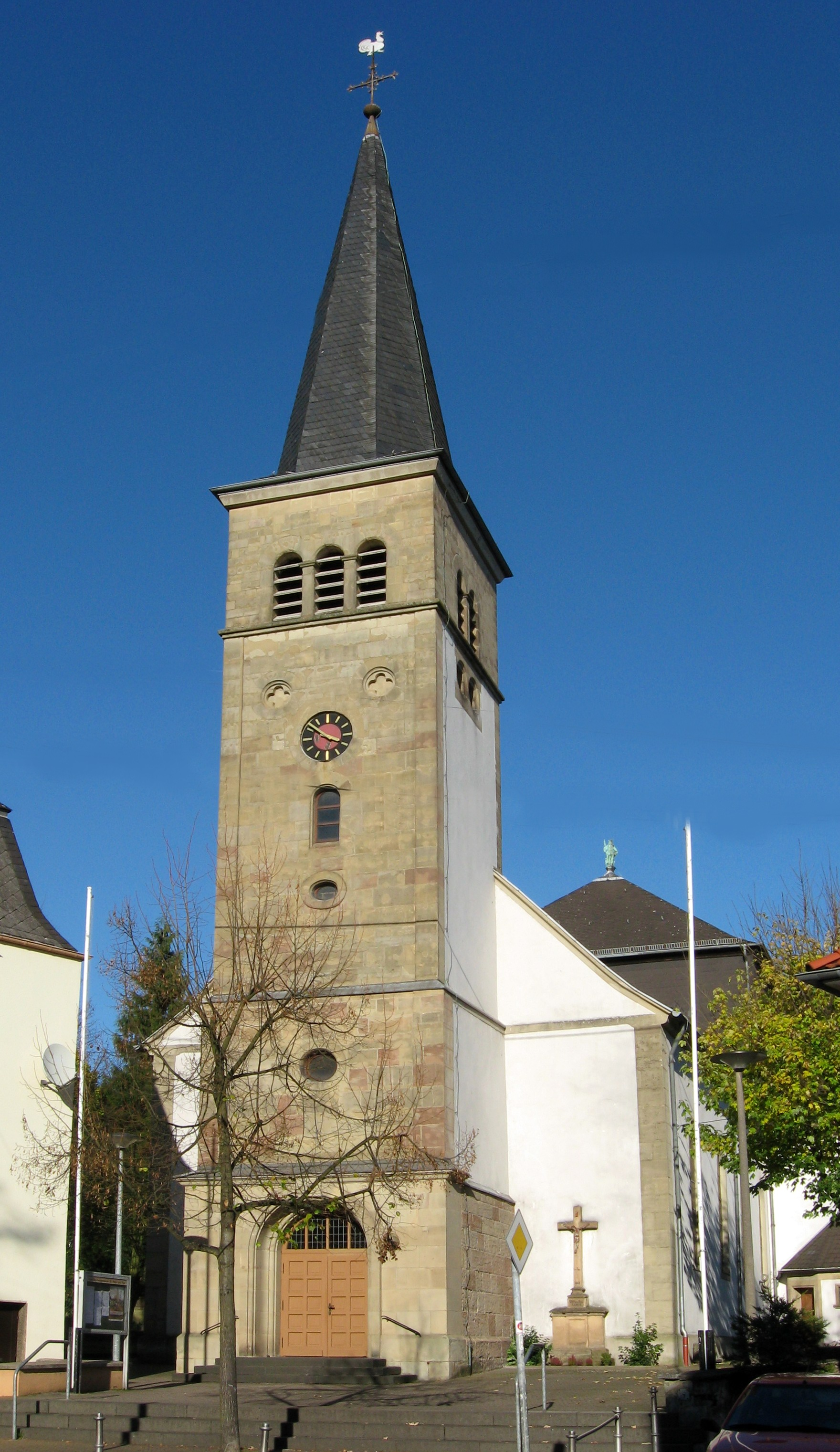
- Catholic Church St. Peter and Paul and St. Hubertus

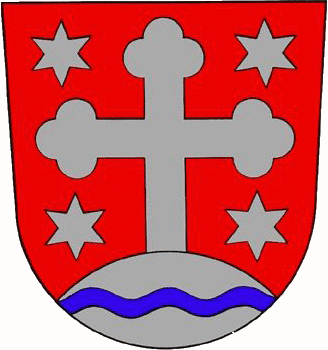
- Coat of arms

- Location of Nalbach within Saarlouis district
- Interactive map of Nalbach
- Location within Germany Location within Saarland
- Coordinates: 49°22′N 6°46′E
- Country: Germany
- State: Saarland
- District: Saarlouis
- Subdivisions: 4

Government
  - Mayor (2019–29): Peter Lehnert

Area
  - Total: 22.43 km^{2} (8.66 sq mi)
- Elevation: 189–414 m (620–1,358 ft)

Population (2025-12-31)
  - Total: 9,106
  - Density: 406.0/km^{2} (1,051/sq mi)
- Time zone: UTC+01:00 (CET)
  - Summer (DST): UTC+02:00 (CEST)
- Postal codes: 66807–66809
- Dialling codes: 06838
- Vehicle registration: SLS
- Website: www.nalbach.de

Nalbach is a municipality in the district of Saarlouis in Saarland, Germany. It is situated approximately 8 km (5.0 mi) northeast of Saarlouis, and 20 km (12 mi) northwest of Saarbrücken.
