= Jo Leinen =

German politician (born 1948)

Jo Leinen MEP
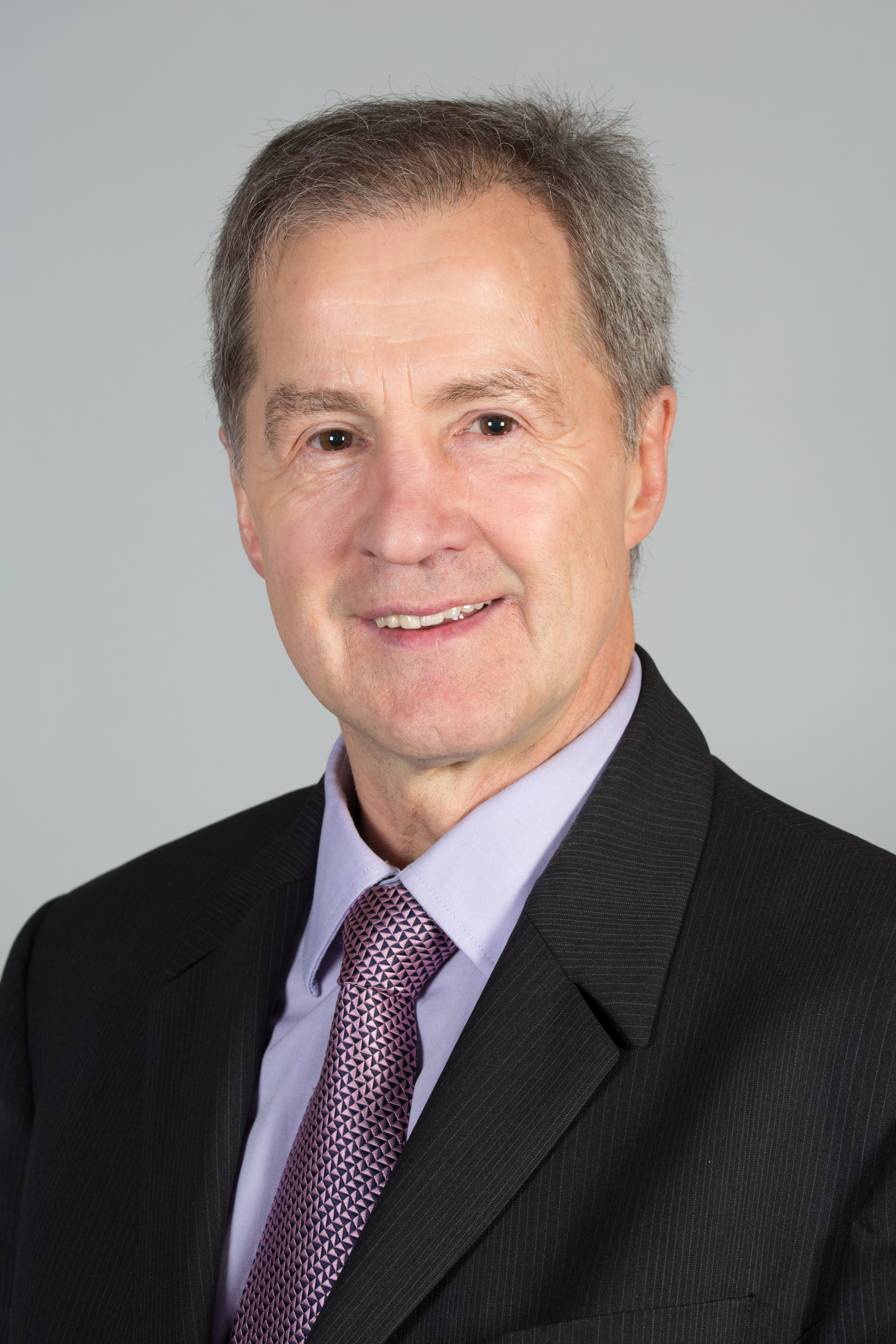

Member of the European Parliament
- In office 1 July 1999 – 2019
- Constituency: Germany

President of the Union of European Federalists
- In office 1 May 1997 – 17 August 2005
- Preceded by: Francesco Rossollillo
- Succeeded by: Mercedes Bresso

Personal details
- Born: Joseph Leinen; 6 April 1948 (age 78) Bisten, Saarland, Germany
- Party: German: Social Democratic Party of Germany; EU: Party of European Socialists
- Spouse: Heike Gross
- Children: 1
- Education: Saarland University, University of Bonn
- Website: www.joleinen.de

Joseph Leinen (born 6 April 1948) is a German politician who served as Member of the European Parliament (MEP) from 1999 until 2019. He is a member of the Social Democratic Party, part of the Party of European Socialists.

He is well known for his environmental and foreign affairs activities, as well as for his support for a Federal Europe. He obtained a law degree in Germany in 1972 and a Certificate of Advanced European Studies from the College of Europe in Bruges, Belgium, in 1974. Since 1977 he has worked as a lawyer.

== Extraparliamentary tasks ==
Leinen became publicly known as a spokesman of the anti-nuclear movement and the peace movement (1980), he was also active for the Bundesverband Bürgerinitiativen Umweltschutz (BBU). He received the nickname "container-Jo" during a demonstration, having climbed a container in order to coordinate protest actions by megaphone. Because of his participation at a demonstration against the Brokdorf Nuclear Power Plant (1981), he was briefly charged with being "guide and ringleader" of a rioting 'mob', however the Federal Constitutional Court eventually dropped charges against him, ruling that there can not be a case of "guide and ringleader" during collective actions. (One of his defenders at the time was Gerhard Schröder, former Chancellor of the BRD.)

== Party ==
Jo Leinen is a member of the SPD and had different functions:

- 1977–1979: Europe-Secretary of the youth of the SPD
- 1981–1985: member of the committee of environment of the SPD
- 1985–1999: member of the state-directorate of the SPD Saar
- 1996 until today: member of the Europe-Commission of the SPD

== Career in national politics ==
From 1985 until 1999, Leinen was a Member of the Landtag of Saarland. He served as State Minister of the Environment in the government of Minister-President Oskar Lafontaine between 1985 and 1994.

From 1995, Leinen was also a substitute member of the Committee of the Regions (CoR), invariably standing in for Lafontaine. In 1999, he was also member of the municipal council of Püttlingen/Saar.

== Member of the European Parliament ==
Leinen was elected Member of the European Parliament without interruption from 1999 until 2019. In parliament, he focused on environment, the development of the unification of the European Union and on foreign affairs. From 2004 he was the President of some key Committees and Delegations in the EP.

In 2015, Leinen was one of the Parliament's two rapporteurs (alongside Danuta Hübner) on a set of proposed changes to EU electoral law that sought to regularize a variety of different electoral systems across the EU.

In addition to his committee assignments, Leinen served on the European Parliament Intergroup on a European Constitution from 1999 until 2009.

In the negotiations to form a coalition government under the leadership of Chancellor Angela Merkel following the 2017 federal elections, he was part of the working group on European policy, led by Peter Altmaier, Alexander Dobrindt and Achim Post.

=== EP Parliamentary activities, membership in Committees and in Delegations ===
Parliamentary activities
	Speeches in Plenary	Reports - as rapporteur	Opinions - as rapporteur	Motions for resolutions	Written declarations	Parliamentary questions
5th Legislature; 1999-2004	48	5	0	4	3	11
6th Legislature; 2004-2009	83	11	1	8	5	21
7th Legislature; 2009-2014	80	4	5	14	3	52
8th Legislature; 2014-2019	53	1	4	22	4	18

Membership in EP Committees
	President	Vice-President	Full member	Substitute Member
5th Legislature (1st half); 1999-2002			Committee on Constitutional Affairs	Committee on Budgets
5th Legislature (2nd half); 2002-2004		Committee on Constitutional Affairs		Committee on Foreign Affairs, Human Rights, Common Security and Defense Policy
6th Legislature 2004-2009	Committee on Constitutional Affairs			Committee on Foreign Affairs
7th Legislature (1st half); 2009-2012	Committee on the Environment, Public Health and Food Safety			Committee on Foreign Affairs
7th Legislature (2nd half); 2012-2014			Committee on the Environment, Public Health and Food Safety	Committee on Foreign Affairs
8th Legislature; 2014-2019			Committee on Constitutional Affairs	Committee on Foreign Affairs Committee on the Environment, Public Health and Food Safety

Membership in EP Delegations
	President	Full member	Substitute Member
5th Legislature; 1999-2004		Delegation to the EU-Romania; Joint Parliamentary Committee	
6th Legislature (1st half); 2004-2007		Delegation for relations with the countries of South Asia and the South Asia Association for Regional Cooperation (SAARC)	Delegation to the ACP-EU; Joint Parliamentary Assembly
6th Legislature (2nd half); 2007-2009		Delegation for relations with the countries of South Asia	Delegation to the ACP-EU; Joint Parliamentary Assembly Delegation for relations with India
7th Legislature 2009-2014		Delegation for relations with India	Delegation to the ACP-EU; Joint Parliamentary Assembly
8th Legislature; 2014-2019	Delegation for relations with the People's Republic of China		Delegation to the ACP-EU; Joint Parliamentary Assembly

== Commitment to European ideal ==
Leinen was Chairman of the German section of the Young European Federalists (JEF) from 1977 to 1979 and a member of its Federal Committee at European level, then chaired by Richard Corbett. He was European Secretary of the youth section of the SPD (Jusos) and Vice-President of the European Environment Bureau (EEB) in Brussels from 1979 to 1984.

He was member in the Committee of the Regions from 1995 to 1999 and in the Congress of the Regions and Communes of the Council of Europe. Currently, he is member of different organisations of culture, social and sport; and also vice-president of EUROSOLAR e.V (1988-2005).

He was President of the UEF (1997–2005). He served as vice-president of the European Movement International from 2005 to 2011 until in November 2011 he was elected president of the organisation.

== Other activities ==
Leinen has been President of the Union of European Federalists since 1997. In addition, he holds various other positions, including:

- Committee for a Democratic UN, Member of the Advisory Council (since 2004)
- Energy Watch Group (EWG), Member
- Union of European Federalists (UEF) Europa-Union Deutschland
- European Movement International, Member
- European Policy Centre (EPC), Member of the Strategic Council
- German Industry Initiative for Energy Efficiency (DENEFF), Member of the Parliamentary Advisory Board
- "A Soul for Europe", Parliamentarian Working Group of the Advisory Board

== Recognition ==
- 1985: Award from the environment foundation

== Publications ==
- Öffentlichkeit in Europa: Europäische Öffentlichkeit als neuer Antrieb für europäische Politik, in: Claudio Franzius/ Ulrich K. Preuss (Hrsg.), Europäische Öffentlichkeit, Baden-Baden 2004, S.31–37.
- zusammen mit Justus Schönau: Auf dem Weg zur europäischen Demokratie. Politische Parteien auf EU-Ebene: neue Entwicklungen, in: Integration, 3/2003, S. 218–227.
