= Bisten =

Bisten may refer to:

- Bist (river) on the France-Germany border
- Bisten-en-Lorraine, a village in northeastern France
- Bisten, Saarland, a village in western Germany
