= France–Germany border =

International border

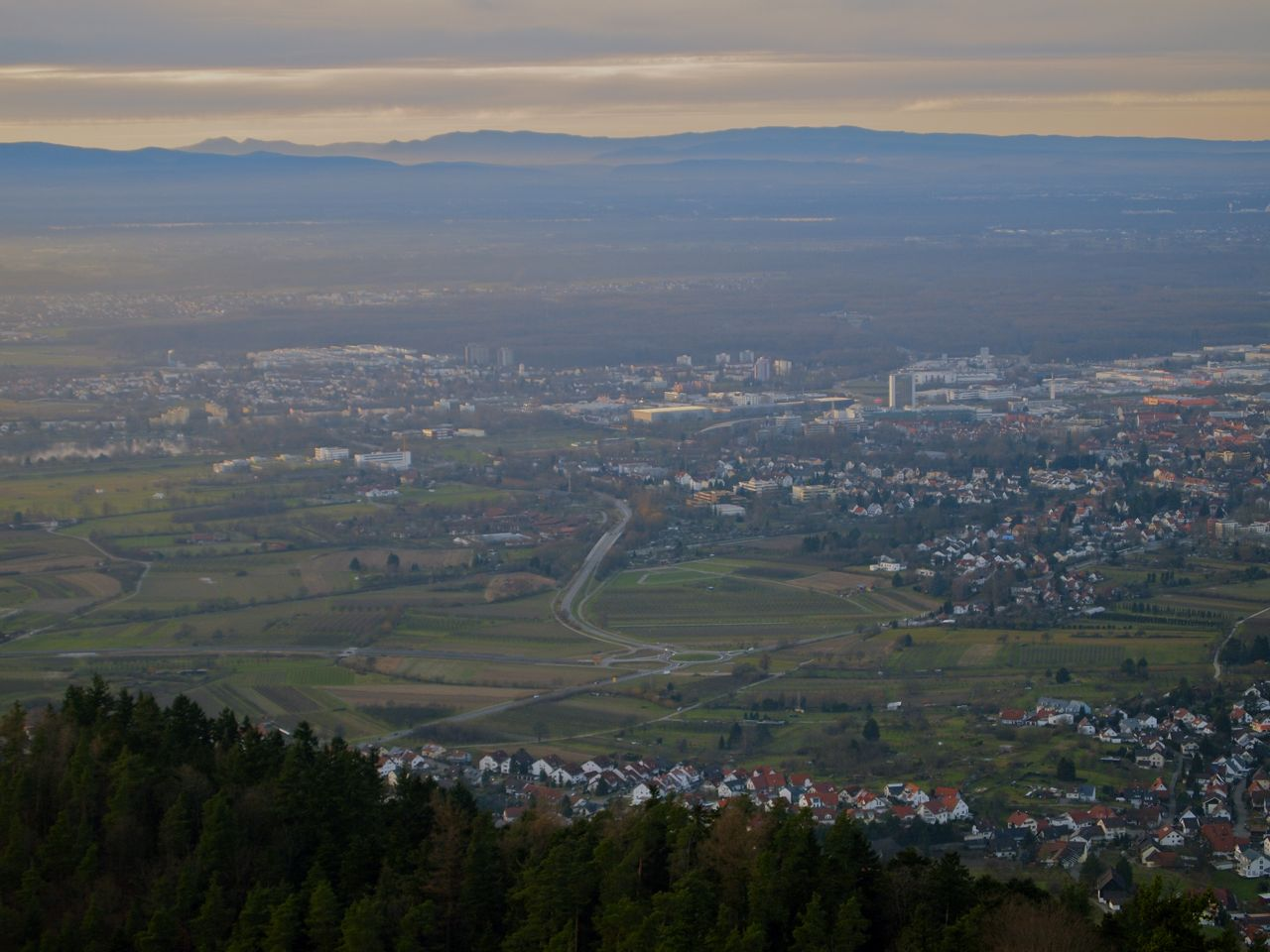
- View of Offenburg looking west, with the Vosges (Mont Donon) in the background

Characteristics
- Entities: France; Germany
- Length: 450 km (280 mi)

The international border between the modern states of France and Germany has a length of 450 km (280 mi). The southern portion of the border, between Saint-Louis at the border with Switzerland and Lauterbourg, follows the River Rhine (Upper Rhine) in a south-to-north direction through the Upper Rhine Plain. The border then turns westward until it reaches the tripoint between France, Germany and Luxembourg.

== History ==
The Franco-German border can be traced back to the 17th century, and the various treaties following the Thirty Years' War (1618–1648), starting with the Treaty of Westphalia (1648) and the Treaty of Nijmegen (1678–1679), marking the Rhine as the frontier between the Kingdom of France, and the different German states. The actual border was determined in the Congress of Vienna in 1815. The border then changed after the French defeat during the Franco-Prussian War (1870–1871), where the French Third Republic was forced to yield Alsace-Lorraine to the new German Empire in 1871. The territory was then returned to France 48 years later after the Treaty of Versailles in 1919. The border changed again in 1941 when Nazi Germany de facto annexed the region (without international legal recognition, or treaty). The current border was re-established after the defeat of Nazi Germany in World War II.

In 2019, German authorities instituted extended border checks. These checks resulted in 178 people who had been banned from entering Germany being denied entry. 1,177 people on the wanted list were arrested, there were 1,235 breaches of residency laws, 406 breaches against narcotics laws, 205 breaches of weapons laws, 47 cases of falsified documents, and 19 people with extremist backgrounds were hindered from entering Germany. Most of these were along the borders to France and Austria.

== Route ==
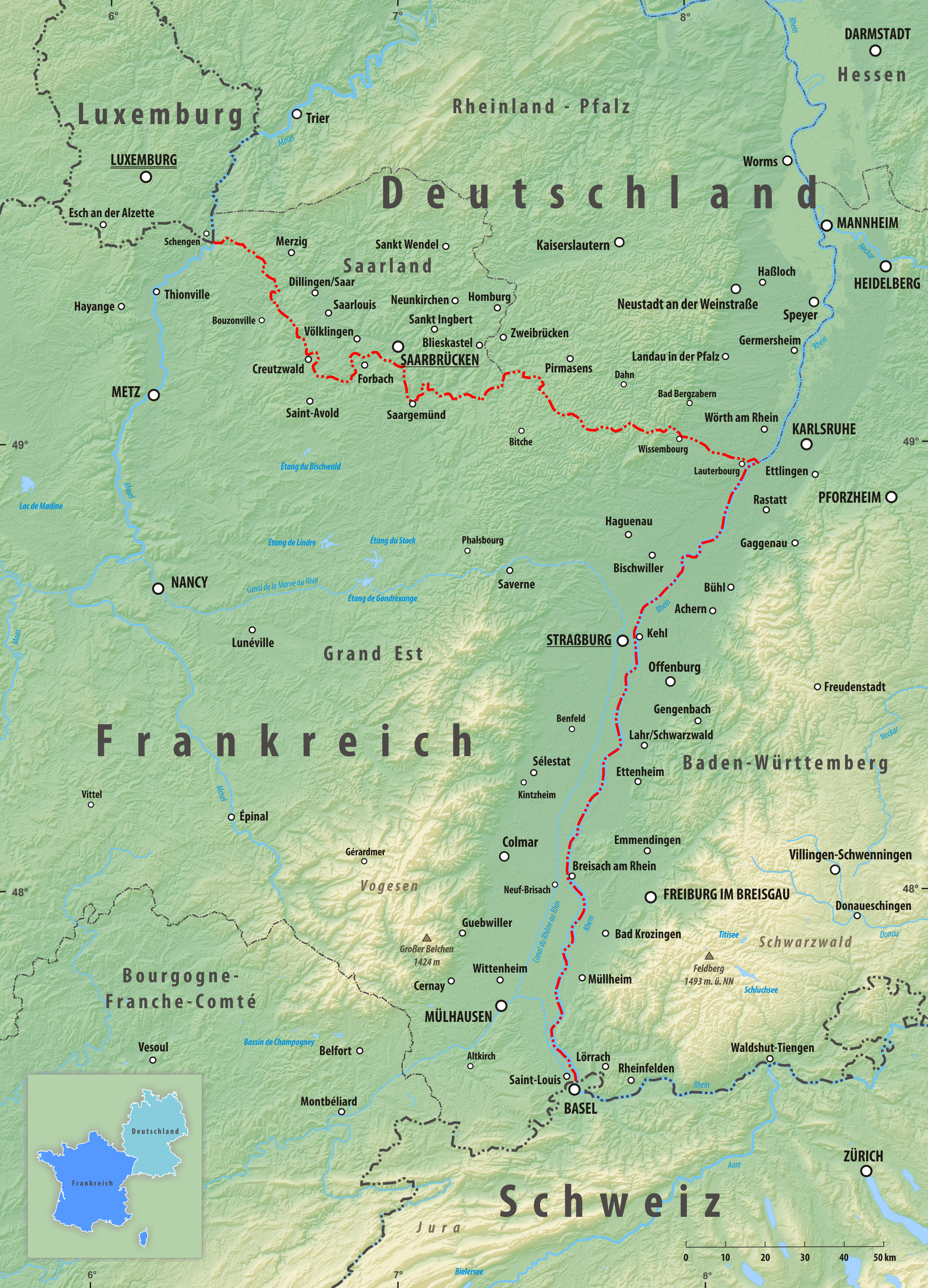
France-Germany border (red)

The border follows the Upper Rhine from the tripoint (Dreiländereck) with the French-Swiss and the German-Swiss borders at Basel (47.590°N 7.589°E), passing between Strasbourg and Offenburg. The Rhine forms the eastern border of Alsace on the French side and the western border of Baden-Württemberg on the German side.

Upstream of Karlsruhe (48.967°N 8.234°E), the border leaves the Rhine, cutting westward to forming the northern border of Alsace and Lorraine on the French side, and the southern border of Rhineland-Palatinate and Saarland on the German side. It passes Saarbrücken, Petite-Rosselle, Freyming-Merlebach, Creutzwald (where it follows the Bist for a short stretch), Überherrn, and meets the E29 before it terminates at the French-Luxembourgish-German tripoint on the Moselle, near the village of Schengen, Luxembourg (49.460°N 6.369°E; chosen as the symbolic site for the signing of the Schengen Agreement between France, Germany, and the Benelux countries in 1985).

== See also ==
- Territorial evolution of Germany
- Territorial evolution of France
- France–Germany relations
- Rhine crisis
- Die Wacht am Rhein
