= Hartmut Boockmann =

German historian (1934–1998)

- Born: 22 August 1934; Marienburg, East Prussia, Germany
- Died: 15 June 1998 (aged 63); Göttingen, Lower Saxony, Germany
- Education: Kiel University
- Occupation: Historian

Hartmut Boockmann (August 22, 1934 – June 15, 1998) was a German historian, specializing in medieval history.

== Biography ==
Boockmann was born in Marienburg, East Prussia, Germany, after 1945 Malbork Poland. He received his Ph.D. in 1965. Boockmann was professor for medieval and modern history in Kiel from 1975 to 1982, then in Göttingen, between 1992 and 1995 at the Humboldt-University of Berlin, and thereafter until his death in Göttingen again. Boockmann was specialized in the German Late Middle Ages. He died in Göttingen.

== Published works ==
- Laurentius Blumenau. Fürstlicher Rat – Jurist – Humanist (ca. 1415-1484), (=Göttinger Bausteine zur Geschichtswissenschaft; Bd. 37), Göttingen 1965 (dissertation)
- Johannes Falkenberg, der Deutsche Orden und die polnische Politik. Untersuchungen zur politischen Theorie des späteren Mittelalters. Mit einem Anhang: Die Satira des Johannes Falkenberg, Göttingen 1975 (Habilitation) ISBN 3-525-35354-5
- Der Deutsche Orden. Zwölf Kapitel aus seiner Geschichte, zuerst München 1981 ISBN 3-406-08415-X
- Die Marienburg im 19. Jahrhundert, zuerst Frankfurt a. M. usw. 1982 ISBN 3-549-06661-9
- Die Stadt im späten Mittelalter, zuerst München 1986 ISBN 3-406-31565-8
- Stauferzeit und spätes Mittelalter. Deutschland 1125–1517, zuerst Berlin 1987 ISBN 3-88680-158-6
- Deutsche Geschichte im Osten Europas, Ostpreußen und Westpreußen, Berlin 1992 ISBN 3-88680-212-4
- Fürsten, Bürger, Edelleute, Lebensbilder aus dem späten Mittelalter, München 1994 ISBN 3-406-38534-6
- Wissen und Widerstand. Geschichte der deutschen Universität, Berlin 1999 ISBN 3-88680-617-0
- Wege ins Mittelalter. Historische Aufsätze, München 2000 ISBN 3-406-46241-3
- Einführung in die Geschichte des Mittelalters, 8. Auflage, München 2007 ISBN 978-3-406-36677-2 .
