= Malbork =

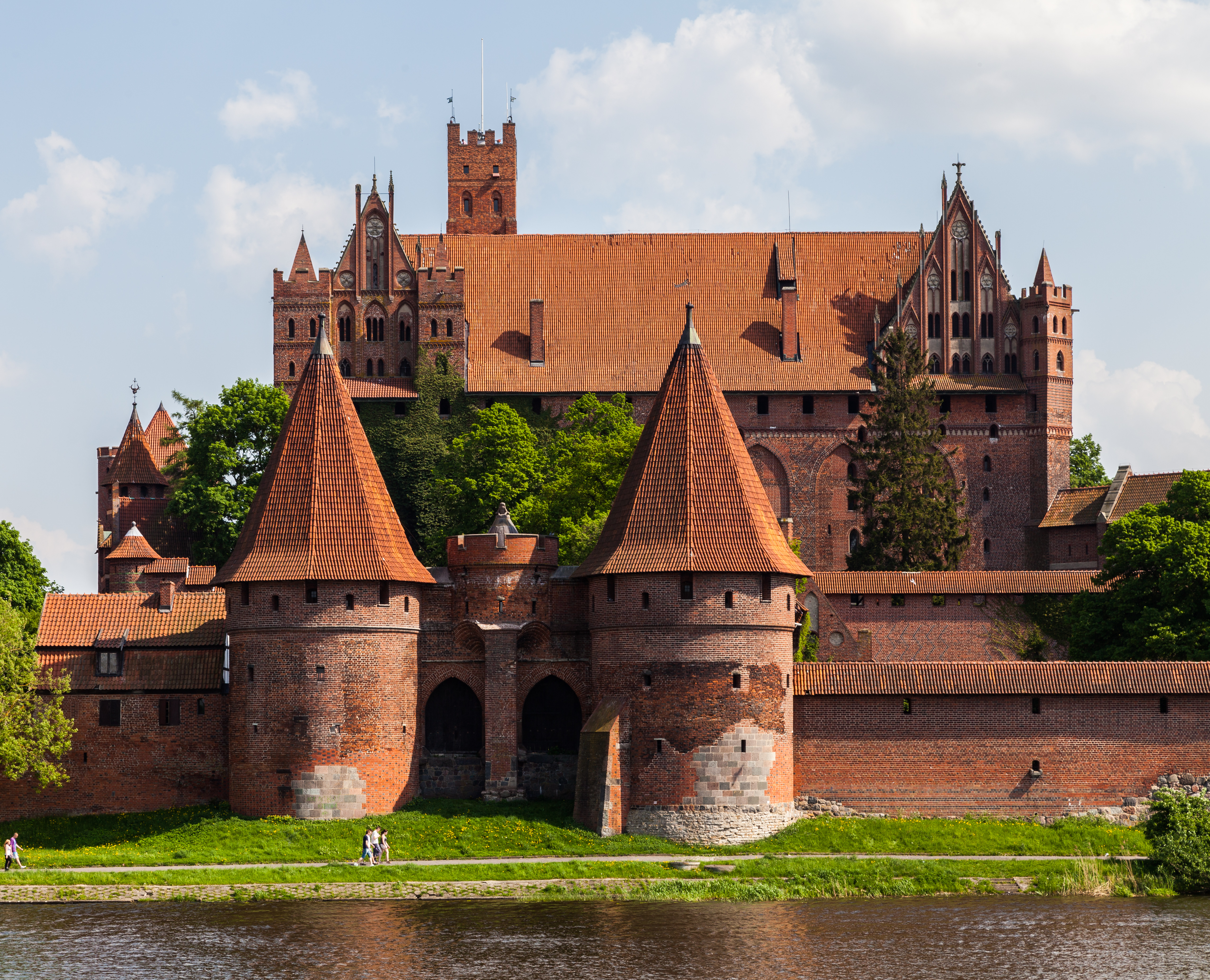
- Malbork Castle

- Flag Coat of arms

- Location within Poland
- Coordinates: 54°2′N 19°2′E
- Country: Poland
- Voivodeship: Pomeranian
- County: Malbork
- Gmina: Malbork (urban gmina)
- Town rights: 1286

Government
  - Mayor: Marek Charzewski (L)

Area
  - Total: 17.16 km^{2} (6.63 sq mi)
- Highest elevation: 30 m (98 ft)
- Lowest elevation: 6 m (20 ft)

Population (2024)
  - Total: 36,709
  - Density: 2,139/km^{2} (5,541/sq mi)
- Time zone: UTC+1 (CET)
  - Summer (DST): UTC+2 (CEST)
- Postal code: 82-200 to 82-210
- Area code: +48 055
- Car plates: GMB
- Website: http://www.malbork.pl

Malbork ([ˈmalbɔrk]; German: Marienburg [maˈʁiːənbʊʁk]) (Note: Other names: Latin: Mariaeburgum, Mariae castrum, Marianopolis, Civitas Beatae Virginis; Kashubian: Malbórg; Old Prussian: Algemin) is a town in the Pomeranian Voivodeship, in northern Poland. It is the seat of Malbork County and has a population of 36,709 people as of 2024. The town is located on the Nogat river, in the region of Powiśle.

Founded in the 13th century by the Knights of the Teutonic Order, the town is noted for its medieval Malbork Castle, built in the 13th century as the order's headquarters, which was also one of the residences of Polish kings and seat of notable early modern Polish institutions.

== History of the castle ==
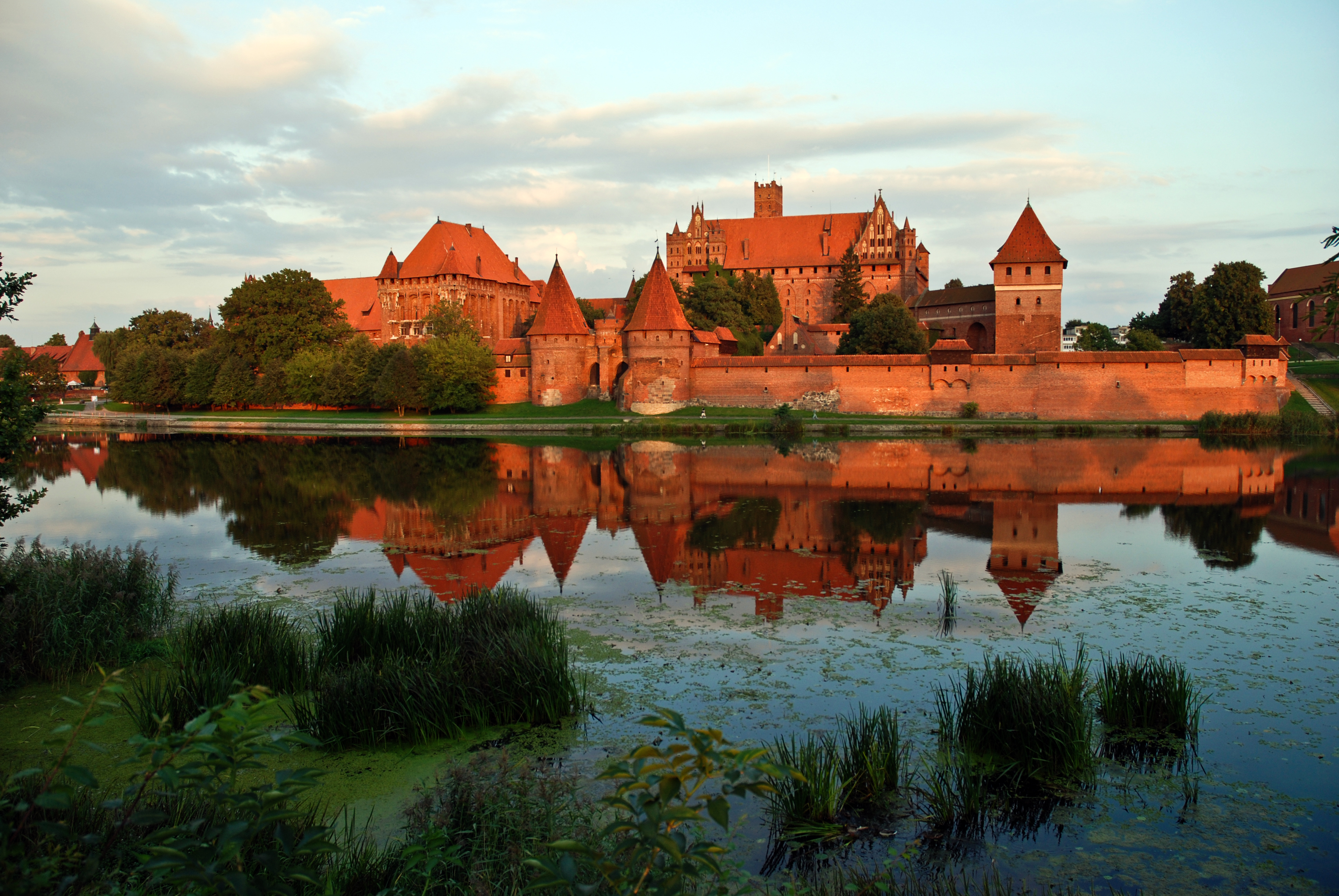
Malbork Castle viewed over the Nogat River

The town was built in Prussia around the fortress Ordensburg Marienburg, which was founded in 1274 on the east bank of the river Nogat by the Teutonic Knights. Both the castle and the town (named Marienburg in German and Malborg or Malbork in Polish) were named for their patron saint, the Virgin Mary. This fortified castle became the seat of the Teutonic Order and Europe's largest Gothic fortress. During the Thirteen Years' War, the castle of Marienburg was pawned by the Teutonic Order to their soldiers from Bohemia. They sold the castle in 1457 to King Casimir IV of Poland in lieu of indemnities. From 1457 to 1772 the castle was one of Poland's royal residences. Polish kings often stayed in the castle, especially when travelling to the nearby city of Gdańsk. In 1708, Polish King Stanisław Leszczyński, his wife Queen consort Catherine Opalińska, and his mother Anna Leszczyńska resided in the castle for several months. Also, astronomer Nicolaus Copernicus visited the castle. From 1568 the castle also housed the Polish Admiralty (Komisja Morska) and in 1584 one of the Polish Royal Mints was established here. The largest arsenal of the Polish–Lithuanian Commonwealth was located in the castle.

Under continuous construction for nearly 230 years, the castle complex is actually three castles combined in one. A classic example of a medieval fortress, it is the world's largest brick castle and one of the most impressive of its kind in Europe. The castle was in the process of being restored by the Germans when World War II broke out. During the war, the castle was over 50% destroyed. Restoration has been ongoing since the war. The castle and its museum are listed as one of UNESCO's World Heritage Sites.

== History of the town ==
Timeline of Malbork
Historical affiliations

Teutonic State, 1274–1457
Kingdom of Poland, 1457–1772
Kingdom of Prussia, 1772–1918
German Reich, 1871–1945
Poland, 1945–present

=== Middle Ages ===
The town grew in the vicinity of the castle. The river Nogat and flat terrain allowed easy access for barges a hundred kilometers from the sea. During Prussia's government by the Teutonic Knights, the Order collected tolls on river traffic and imposed a monopoly on the amber trade. The town later became a member of the Hanseatic League, and many Hanseatic meetings were held there.

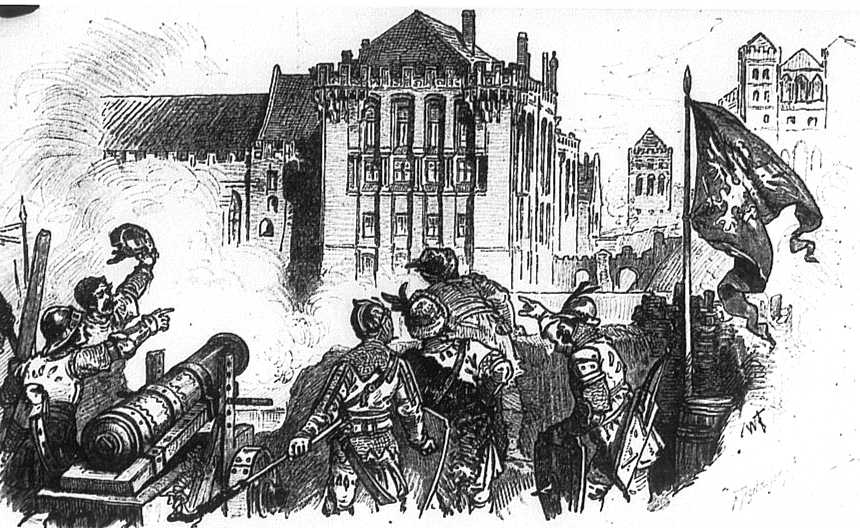
Polish artillery during siege of the castle in 1410 (modern era drawing)

The Teutonic Order weakened greatly after the Battle of Grunwald against advancing Poles and Lithuanians. The town was burned by the Teutonic Knights in 1410 before the siege of the castle by Poles, however it remained under Teutonic control after the siege. In 1457, during the Thirteen Years' War, the castle was sold to Poland by Czech mercenaries of the Teutonic Knights, and the Teutonic Order transferred its seat to Königsberg (now Kaliningrad, Russia). The town, under Mayor Bartholomäus Blume and others, resisted the Poles for three further years. But when the Poles finally took control, Blume was hanged and quartered, and fourteen officers and three remaining Teutonic knights were thrown into dungeons, where they met a miserable end. A monument to Blume was erected in 1864, after the town's annexation by Prussia in the Partitions of Poland.

The town became capital of the Malbork Voivodeship in the Polish province of Royal Prussia (and later also in the Greater Poland Province) after the Second Peace of Thorn (1466).

=== Modern period ===
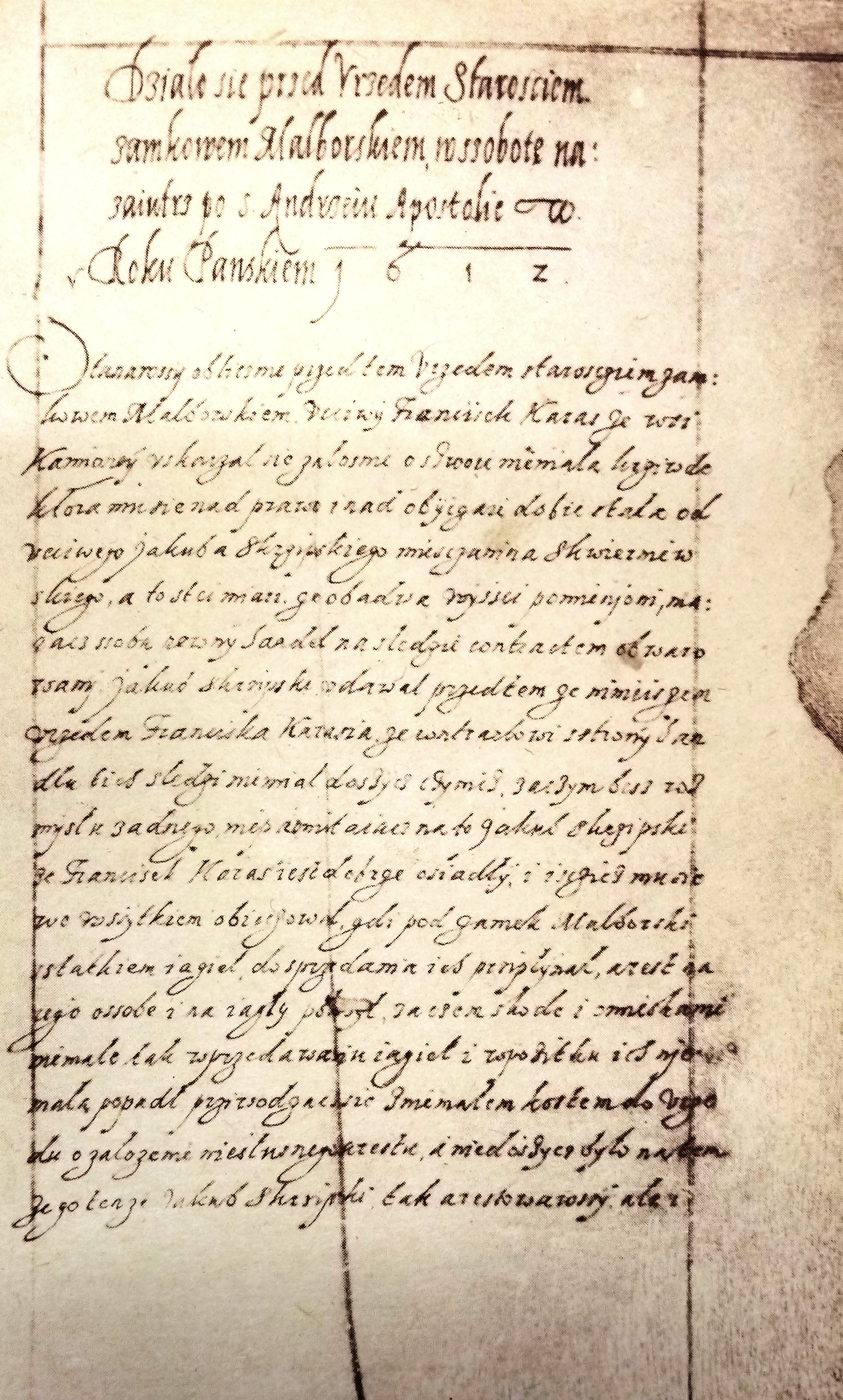
Local court records from 1612, in Polish

Within Poland, Malbork flourished thanks to the Polish grain and wood trade and craft development. New suburbs were created due to lack of space within the defensive walls. In 1626 and 1656, Swedish invasions took place. Local Jesuits fled from Protestant Swedish invaders in 1626 and 1656. In 1680, a Jesuit school was opened. During the Great Northern War in 1710, half of the population died of a cholera epidemic. After the wars, new inhabitants, including immigrants from Scotland, settled in the town, mainly in the suburbs. In 1740 Malbork ceased to be a fortress.

It was annexed by the Kingdom of Prussia in the First Partition of Poland in 1772 and became part of the newly established province of West Prussia the following year. Prussians liquidated the municipal government and replaced it with new Prussian-appointed administration. In the early 19th century, Prussian authorities acknowledged the town's Polish-speaking community, ensuring that priests could deliver the sermon in Polish. In 1807, during the Napoleonic Wars, the French entered the town, and in 1812 the Grande Armée marched through the town heading for Russia. Napoleon has visited the town in those years. In October–December 1831, various Polish cavalry and infantry units of the November Uprising stopped in the town and its environs on the way to their internment places, and later on, one of the insurgents' main escape routes from partitioned Poland to the Great Emigration led through the town.

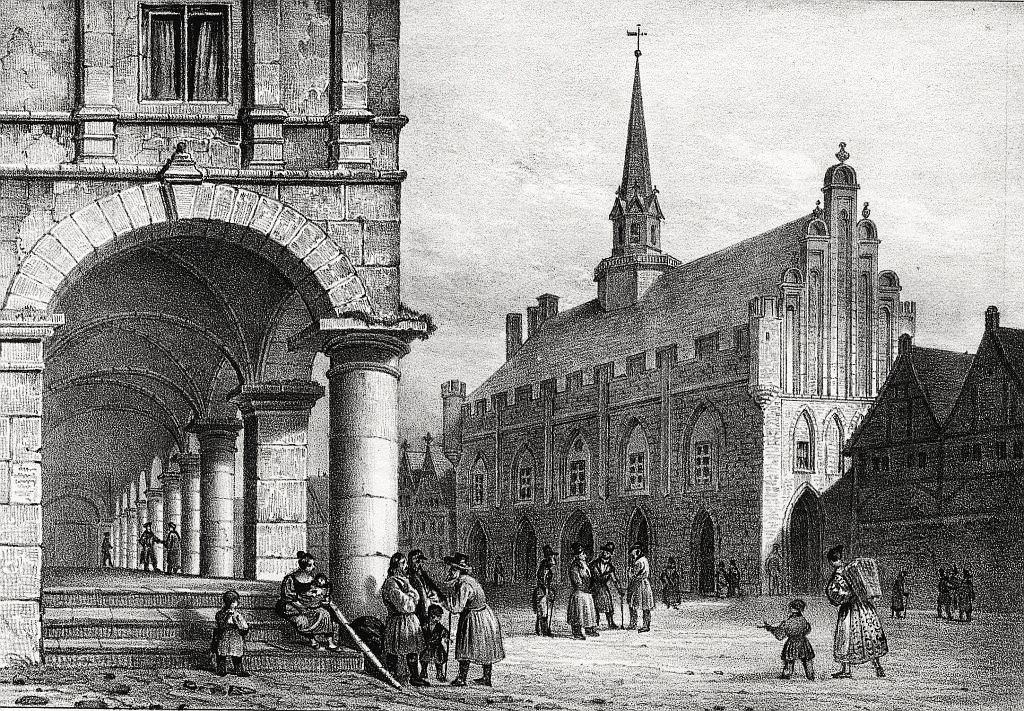
Town hall, circa 1839

There were no World War I fights, however, the town felt the war's negative effects: the influx of refugees, inflation, unemployment, and food supply shortages.

Under the terms of the Treaty of Versailles after World War I, the inhabitants were asked in a plebiscite on 11 July 1920 whether they wanted to remain in Germany or join the newly re-established Poland. In the town of Marienburg, 9,641 votes were cast for Germany, 165 votes for Poland. As a result, Marienburg was included in the Regierungsbezirk Marienwerder within the German Province of East Prussia. During the Weimar era, Marienburg was located at the tripoint between Poland, Germany and the Free City of Danzig.

The town was hit by an economic crisis following the end of World War I. After a brief recovery in the mid-1920s, the Great Depression was particularly severe in East Prussia. In January 1933, Hitler and the Nazi Party came to power and immediately began eliminating political opponents, so that in the last semi-free elections of March 1933, 54% of Marienburg's votes went to the Nazis. After the German invasion of Poland in September 1939, leaders of the Polish minority were arrested and sent to concentration camps.

=== World War II ===
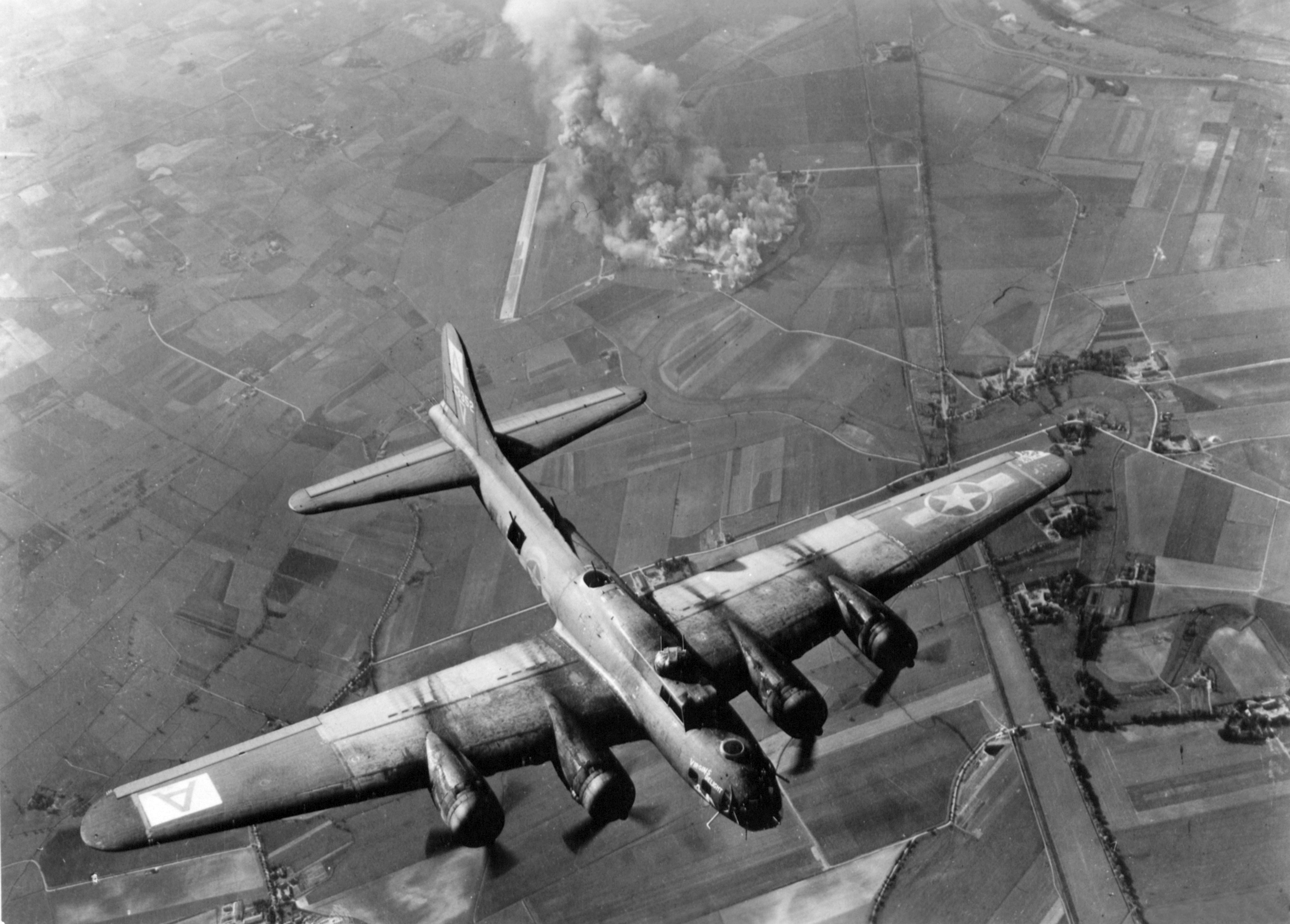
94th Bomb Group B-17 Flying Fortress targeting the Focke-Wulf factory as described.

During World War II a Focke-Wulf aircraft factory was set up at the airfield to the east of Marienburg. It was bombed twice by the USAAF in 1943 and 1944. Today the airfield belongs to the 22nd Air Base of the Polish Air Force.

During the war, the Germans established the Stalag XX-B prisoner of war camp in the present-day district of Wielbark, among the prisoners of which were Polish, British, French, Belgian, Serbian, Italian, Australian, New Zealand and Canadian POWs. Also a forced labour camp was established, and several forced labour subcamps of the Stalag XX-B POW camp. Some expelled Poles from Pomerania were enslaved by the Germans as forced labour in the town's vicinity.

The Polish resistance was present in the town and would smuggle Polish underground press and data on German concentration camps and prisons, spy on the local German industry, and organize transports of POWs who escaped the Stalag XX-B to the port city of Gdynia, from where they were further evacuated by sea to neutral Sweden.

Near the end of World War II, the city was declared a fortress and most of the civilian population fled or were evacuated, with some 4,000 people opting to remain. In early 1945, Marienburg was the scene of fierce battles by the Nazis against the Red Army and was almost completely destroyed. The battle lasted until 9 March 1945. Following the town's military capture by the Red Army, the remaining civilian population disappeared; 1,840 people remain missing. In June 1945, the town was turned over to Polish authorities who had arrived in the town in April and renamed it to its historic Polish name, Malbork. The German population that had not fled was expelled in accordance with the Potsdam Agreement.

Half a century later, in 1996, 178 corpses were found in a mass grave in Malbork; another 123 were found in 2005. In October 2008, during excavations for the foundation of a new hotel in Malbork, a mass grave was found containing the remains of 2,116 people. All the dead were said to have been German residents of pre-1945 Marienburg, but they could not be individually identified, nor could the cause of their deaths be definitely established. A Polish investigation concluded that the bodies, along with the remains of some dead animals, may have been buried to prevent the spread of typhus, which was extant in the turmoil at the end of World War II. The investigation was thus closed on 1 October 2010 as no justifiable suspicions of any crime were found. Majority of the dead were women and children most likely dead from hunger, diseases, cold and as collateral casualties of war operations, only a few of the bones had markings showing possible gunshot wounds. On 14 August 2009, all the dead people's remains were buried in a German military cemetery at Stare Czarnowo in Polish Pomerania, not far from the German border.

=== Post-war period ===
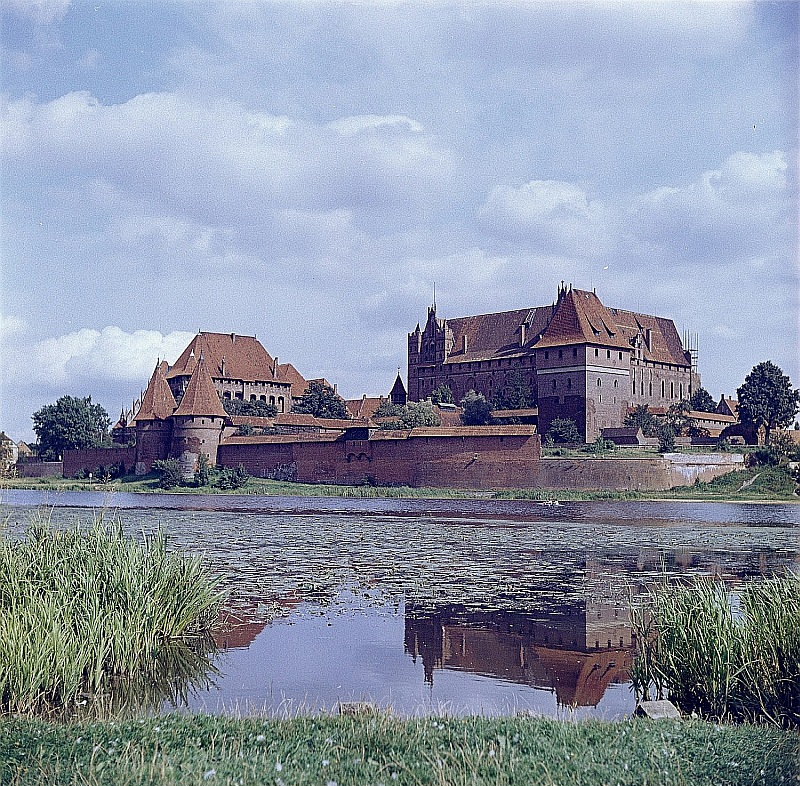
Malbork Castle in the 1960s

After World War II, the town was gradually repopulated by Poles, many expelled from Polish areas annexed by the Soviet Union. In February 1946, the population of the town reached 10,017 people, then by 1965 grew further to 28,292 and by 1994 to 40,347.

In April 1945 the malt house resumed work, in May a Polish post office was established and the first post-war Polish services were held in the St. John church, in September Polish schools were opened. In the following years, most of the war damage was removed, and in 1947 the railway bridge on the Nogat was rebuilt, after it was destroyed by the Germans in March 1945. A new road bridge was built in 1949. In 1946 a sugar factory was established.

Also following the war, the Old Town in Malbork was not rebuilt; instead the bricks from its ruins were used to rebuild the oldest sections of Warsaw and Gdańsk. As a result, with the exception of the Old Town Hall, two city gates and St. John's church, no pre-World War II buildings remain in the Old Town area. In place of the old town, a housing estate was built in the 1960s.

In 1962, a pasta factory was established in Malbork, which soon became one of the largest pasta factories in Poland.

== Traditional language ==
Traditionally, the town was close to the linguistic border between the High Prussian and the Low Prussian dialects of German. Today, the German dialects are extinct.

== Sports ==
The town's football clubs are Pomezania Malbork (men) and Jastrząb Malbork (women), both currently playing in the lower divisions. There are various other clubs in the town, dedicated to sports such as canoeing, swimming, triathlon and karate, as well as a number of youth sports clubs.

== Sights ==
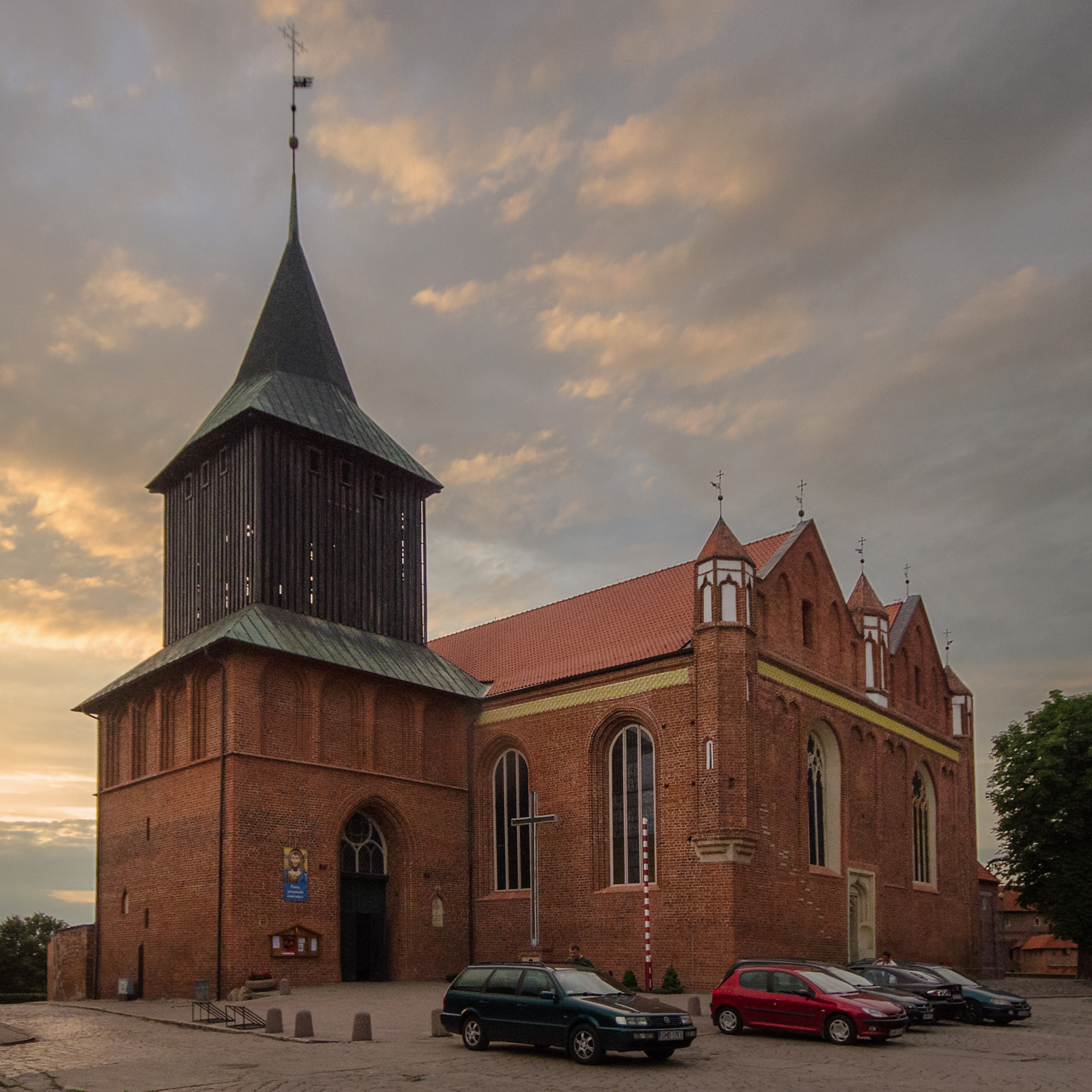
Saint John the Baptist church

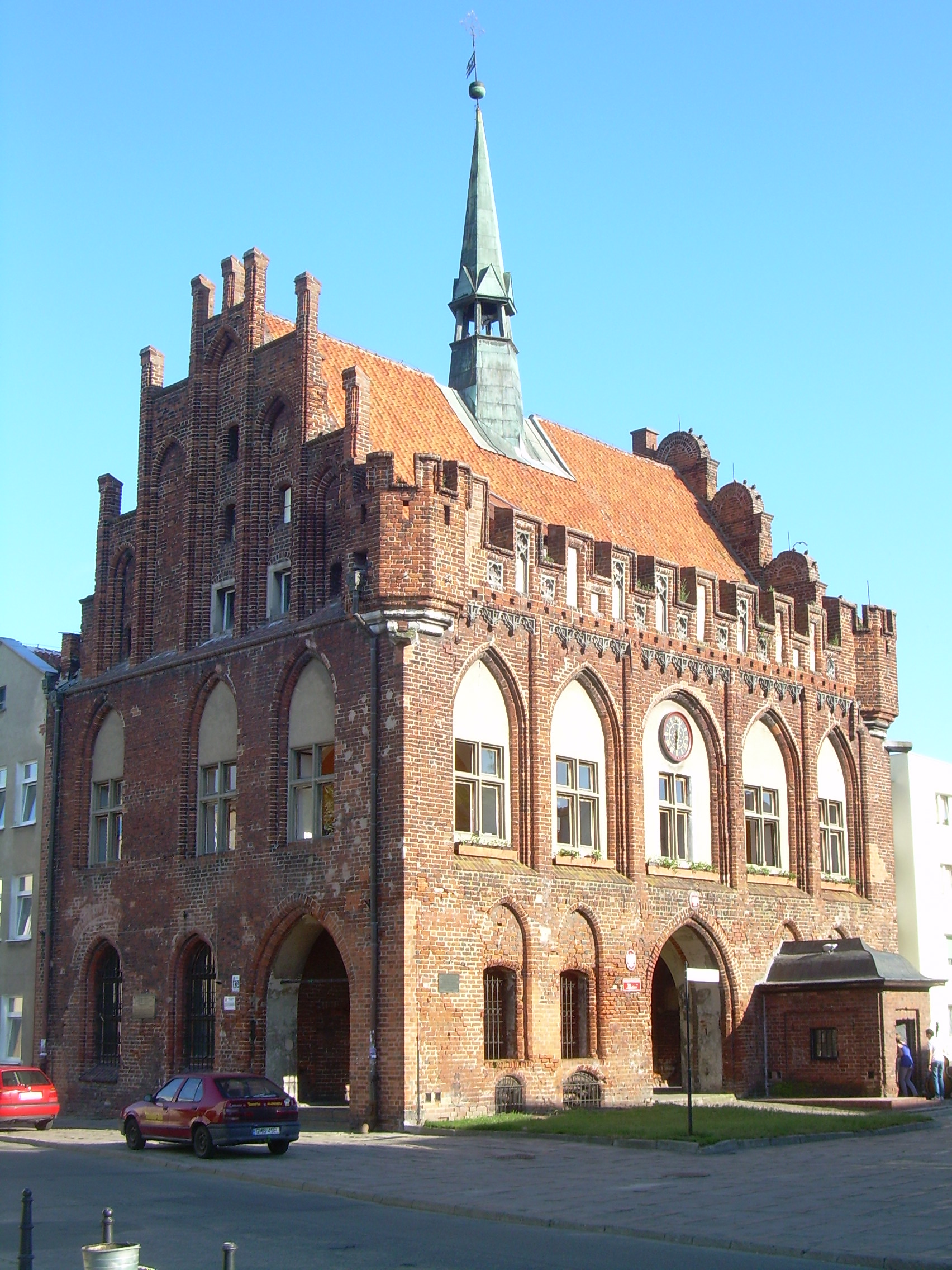
Town hall

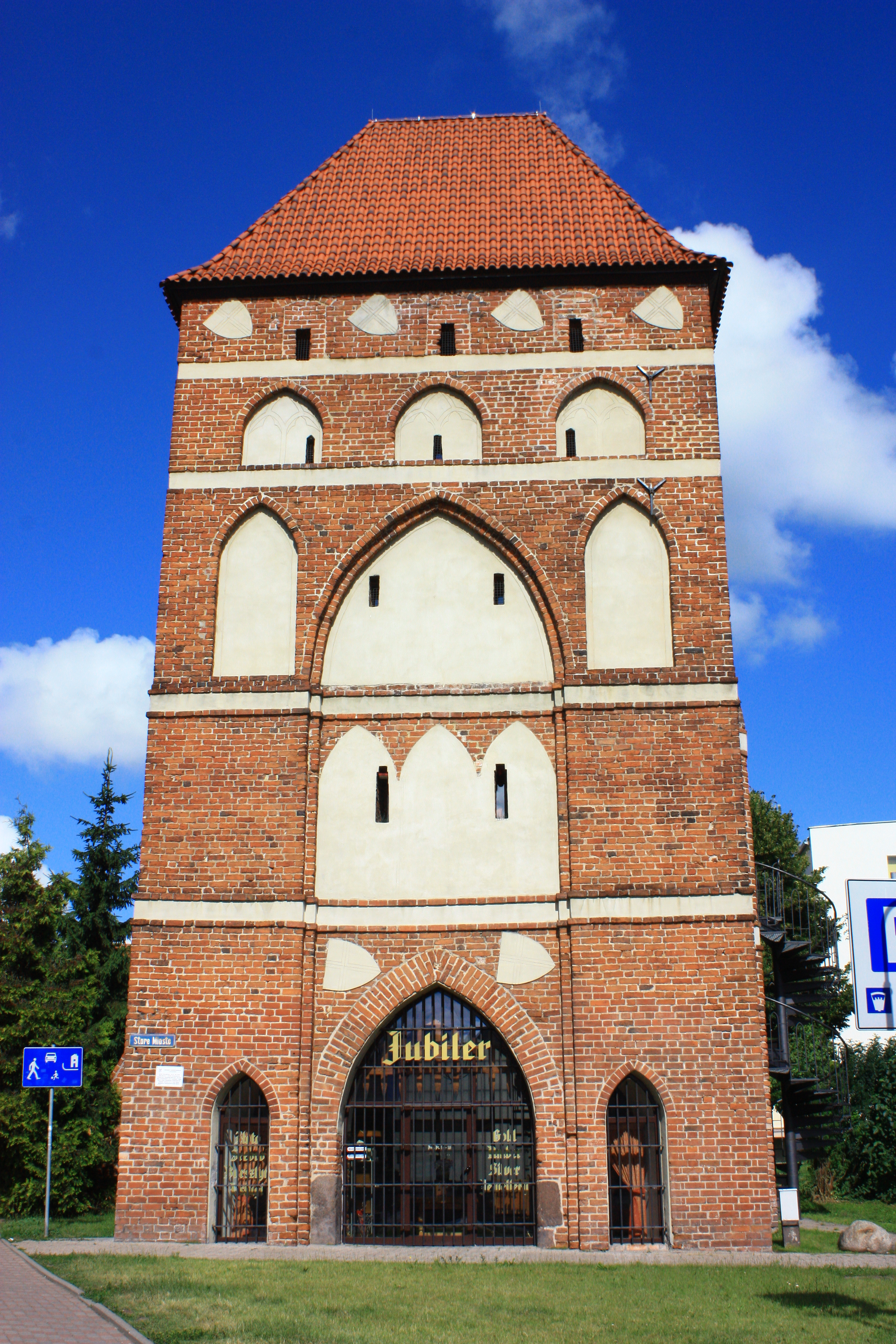
Brama Garncarska

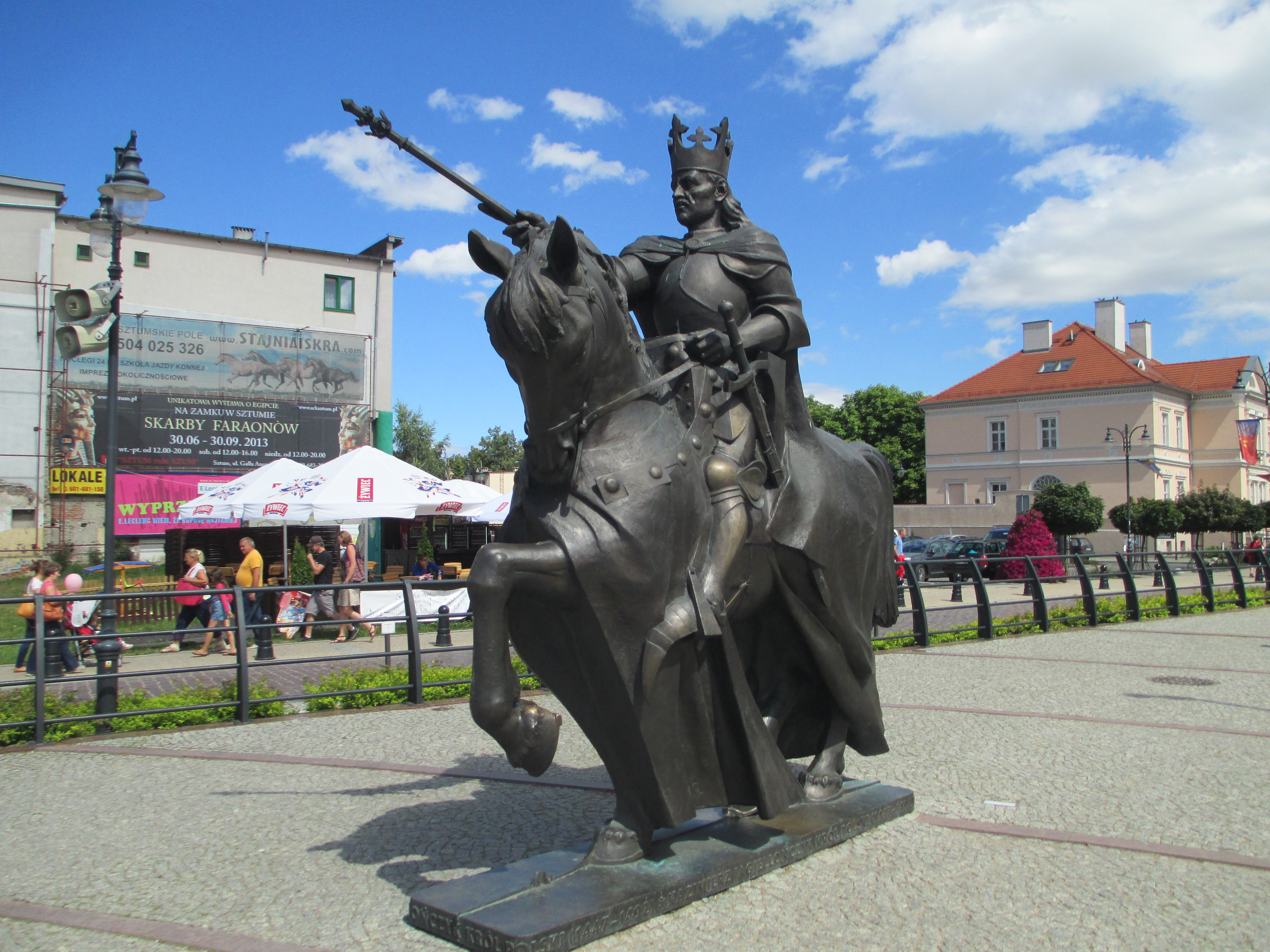
Monument of King Casimir IV Jagiellon

The greatest landmark of Malbork is the Malbork Castle, listed as a UNESCO World Heritage Site and Historic Monument of Poland. Other notable sights include:

- Gothic Saint John the Baptist church
- Gothic town hall (Ratusz)
- Partially preserved medieval town walls with Garncarska (Pottery) and Mariacka gates
- Baroque Our Lady of Perpetual Help church
- Monument of Polish King Casimir IV Jagiellon
- Municipal water tower
- Commonwealth War Graves Commission cemetery with 240 graves, mostly of POWs who died in the area during both wars, especially in the World War II Stalag XX-B camp.

== Notable residents ==
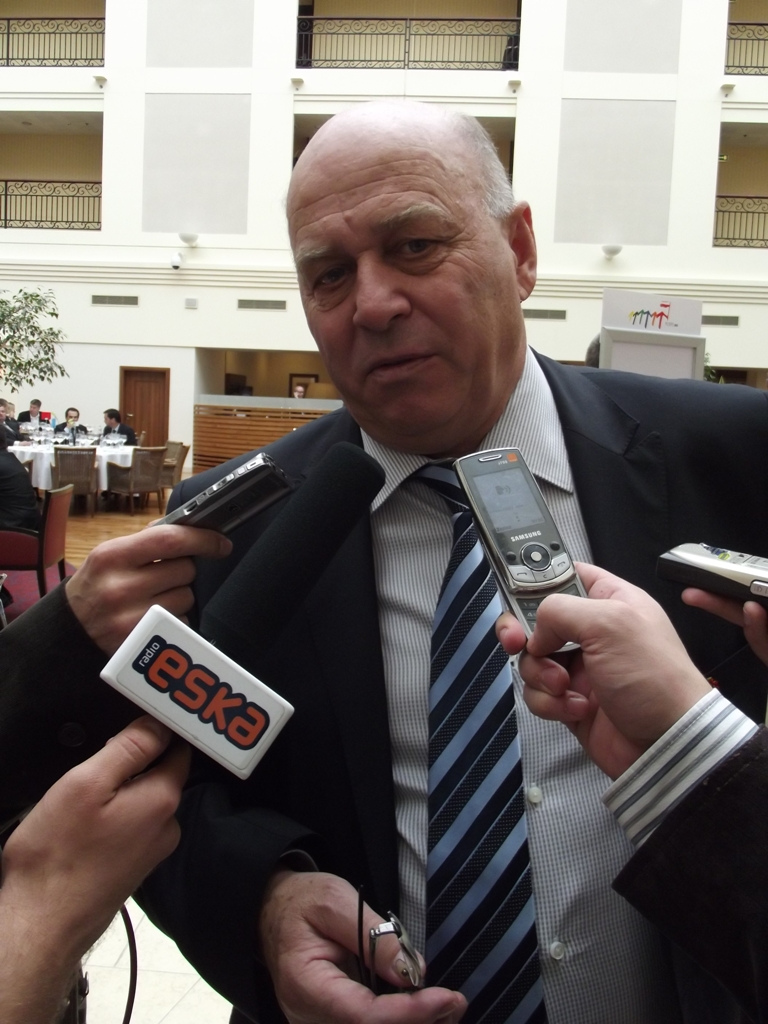
Grzegorz Lato, 2011

- Dietrich von Altenburg the 19th Grand Master of the Teutonic Knights, serving from 1335 to 1341
- Winrich von Kniprode the 22nd Grand Master of the Teutonic Knights and the longest serving from 1351 to 1382
- Konrad von Jungingen (c.1355-1407) the 25th grand master of the Teutonic Order in 1393–1407
- Stibor de Poniec of Clan of Ostoja, Starost of Malbork in 1460
- Jakob Karweyse (active in 1492), goldsmith, first printer in Prussia
- Achatius Cureus (de) (1531–1594), author and lyricist
- Bartholomaeus Praetorius (c.1590–c.1623) a German composer
- Adalbert Krüger (1832–1896) a German astronomer
- Carl Legien (1861–1920), leading politician of the Social Democratic Party of Germany
- Stanisław Taczak (1874–1960), general and commander-in-chief of the Great Poland Uprising; died in Malbork
- Bruno Kurowski (1879–1944) a German lawyer and politician of the Free City of Danzig
- Erich Kamke (1890–1961) a German mathematician, specialized in the theory of differential equations
- Erich Abraham (1895–1971), general
- Heinz Galinski (1912–1992), president of the Central Council of Jews in Germany, 1988–1992
- Alfred Struwe (1927–1998), actor
- Hartmut Boockmann (1934–1998) a German historian, specializing in medieval history
- Ulrich K. Preuss (born 1939), German jurist
- Klaus Ampler (1940–2016) a German cyclist, competed at the 1968 Summer Olympics
- Wolfgang Barthels (born 1940), a retired German football player, over 200 games for F.C. Hansa Rostock
- Christel Lau (born 1944) a retired German field hockey player
- Grzegorz Lato (born 1950), former striker for the Poland national football team and politician
- Jarek Dymek (born 1971) a Polish former strongman competitor
- Shamek Pietucha (1976–2015) a Polish-born Canadian swimmer who represented Canada in the 2000 Summer Olympics
- Izabela Bełcik (born 1980) a Polish volleyball player, Poland women's national volleyball team 1999–2014
- Rafał Murawski (born 1981) a Polish footballer, over 400 club games and 48 games for Poland
- Aneta Florczyk (born 1982) a Polish female athlete and strongwoman
- Marcelina Zawadzka (born 1989), model, Miss Polonia 2011, semifinalist Miss Universe 2012 and TV presenter
- Otto Dietrich zur Linde (fictional), character of Jorge Luis Borges' short story Deutsches Requiem.

== International relations ==
Malbork is twinned with:

- Margny-lès-Compiègne, France (since 2004)
- Monheim am Rhein, Germany (since 2005)
- Nordhorn, Germany (since 1995)
- Sölvesborg, Sweden (since 1999)
- Trakai, Lithuania (since 1997)
- Volodymyr, Ukraine (since 2023)

== Gallery ==
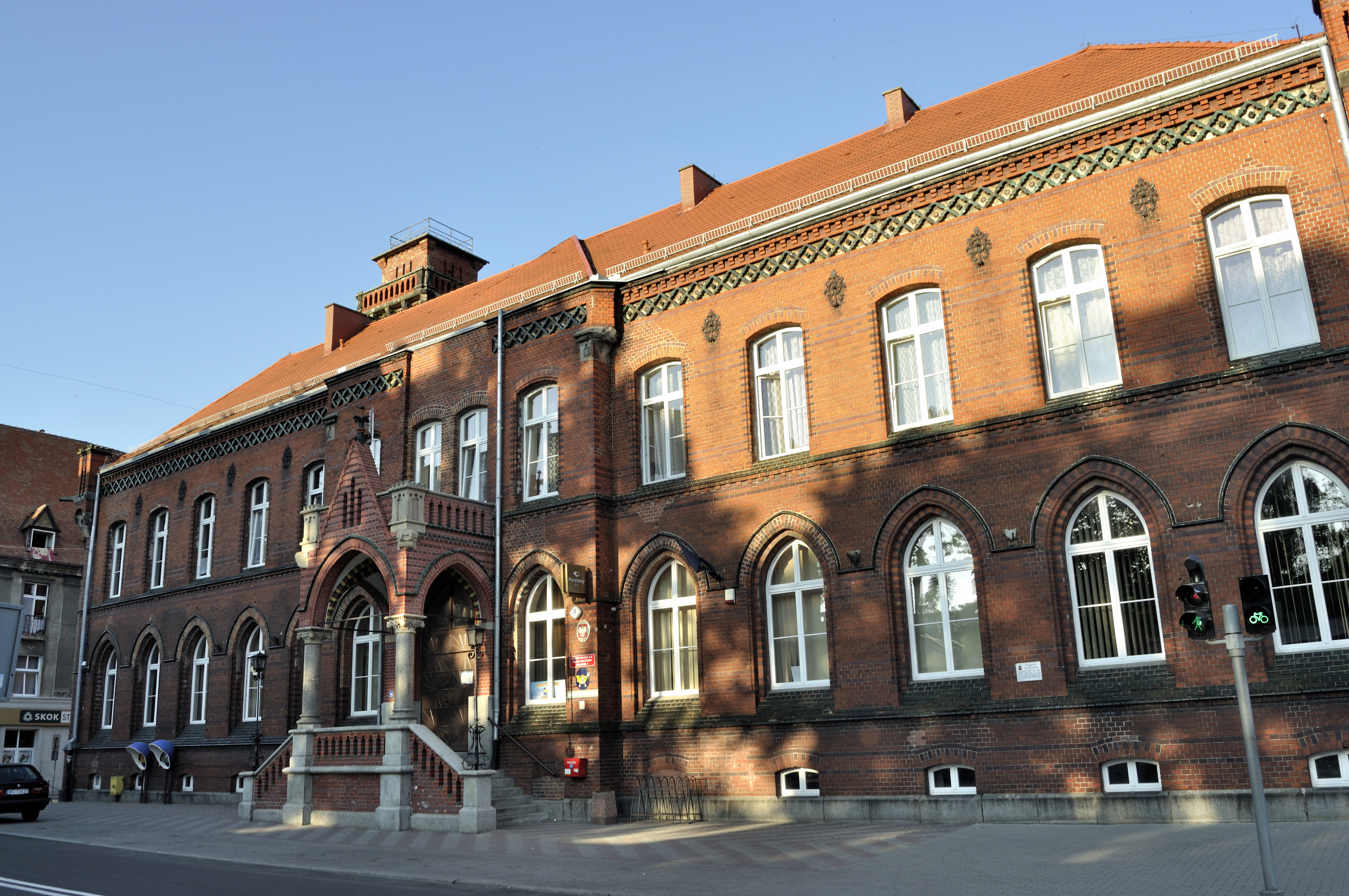
Post office

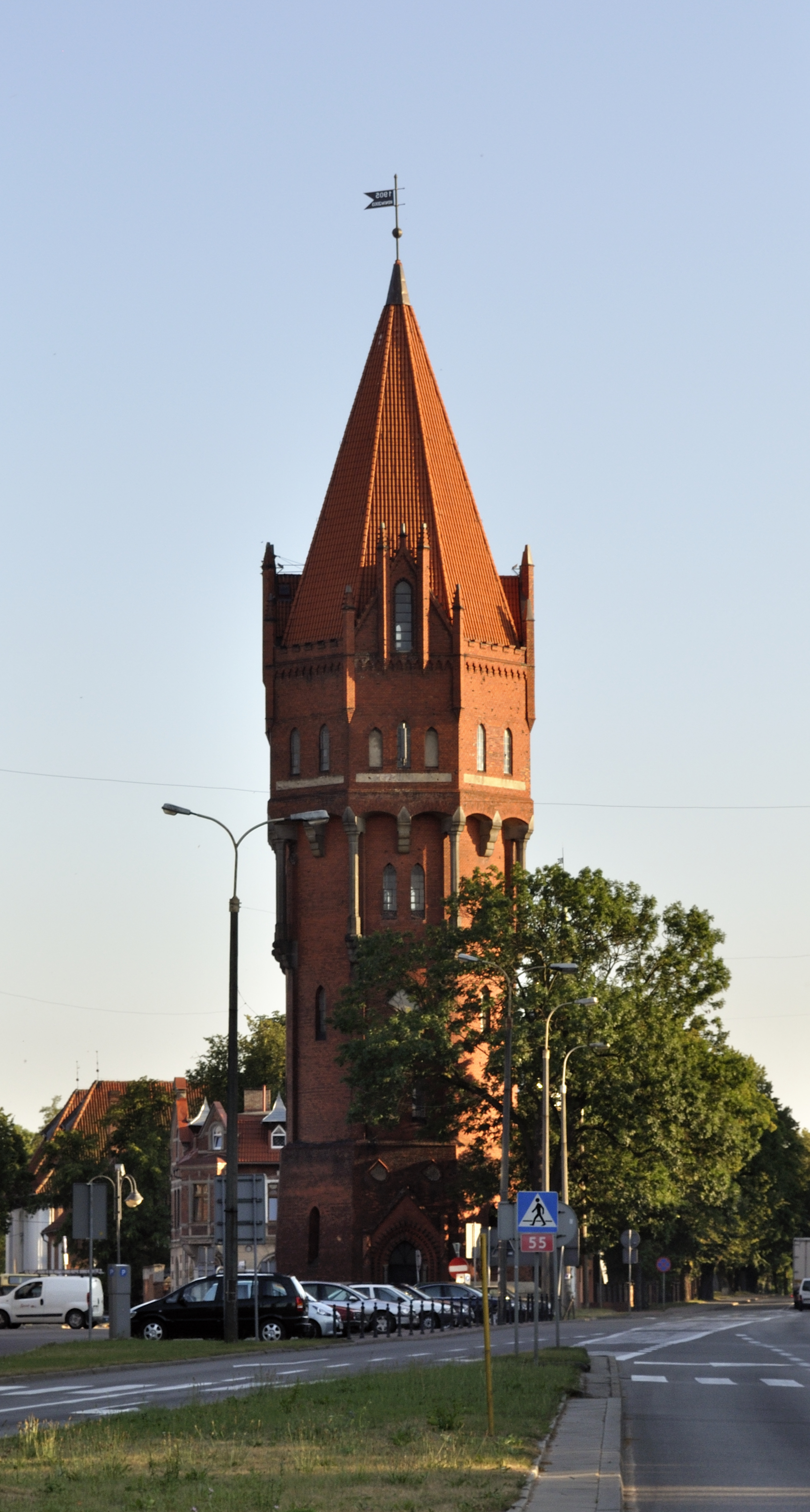
City water tower

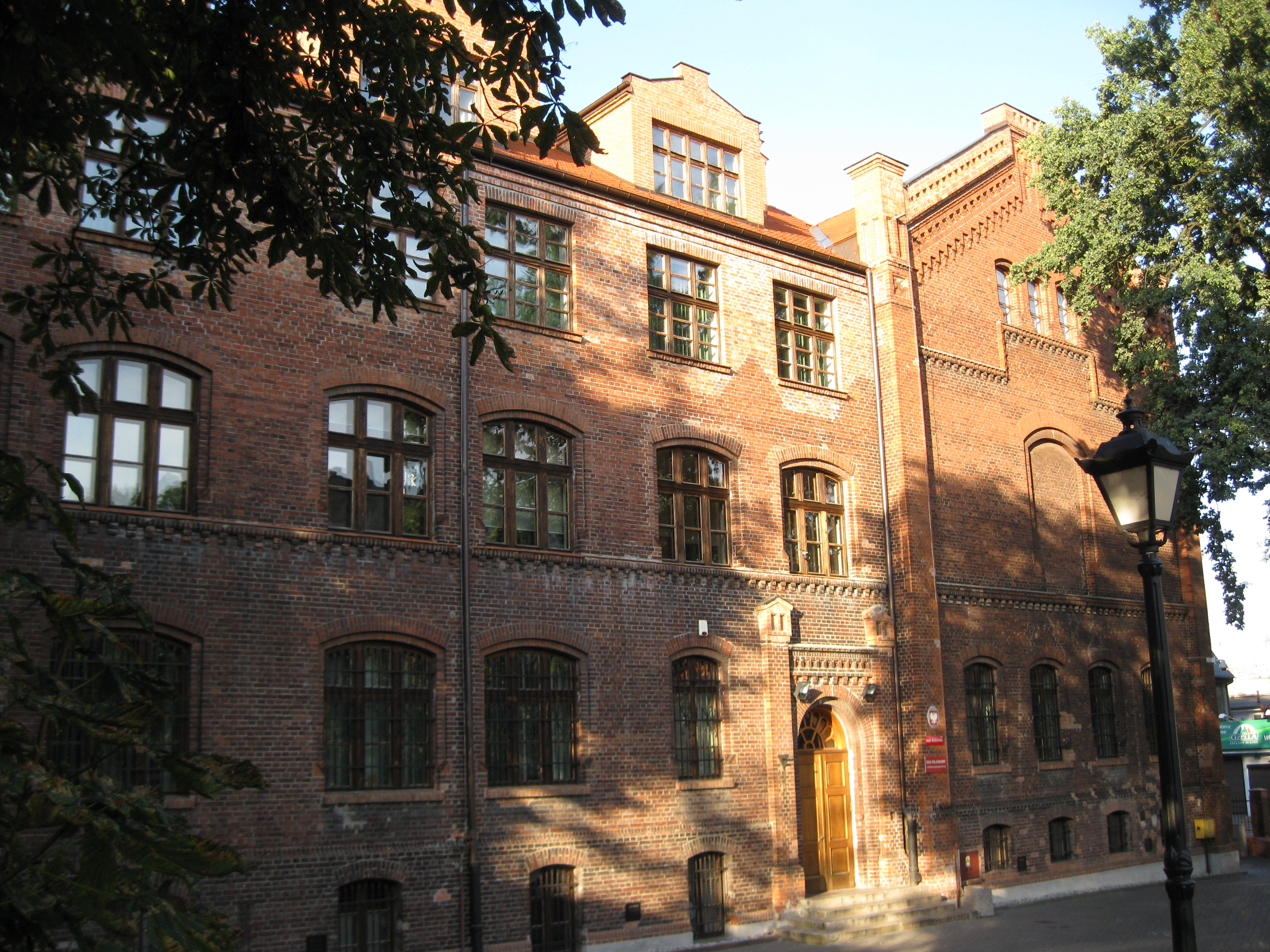
District Court

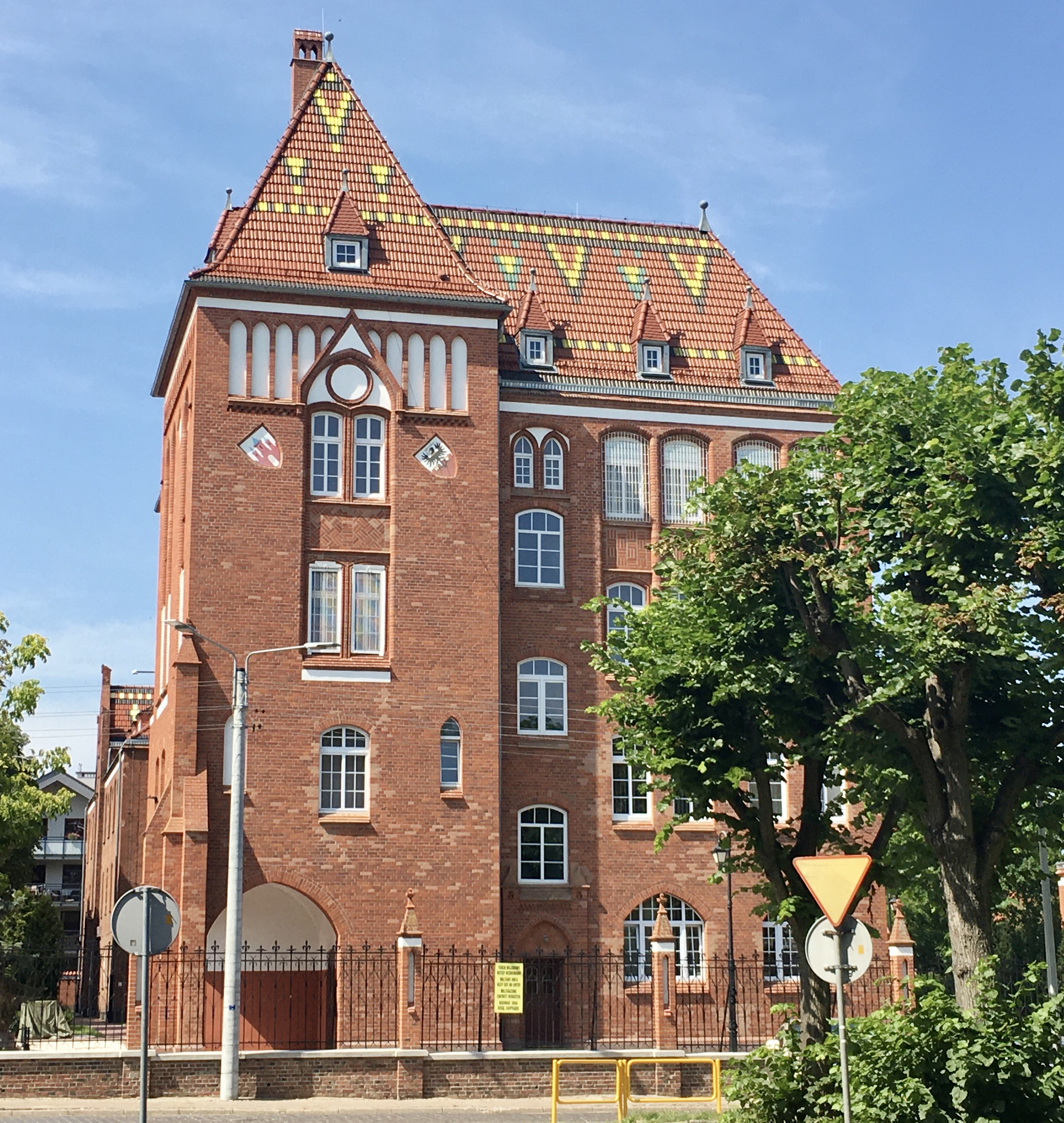
Barracks of the Polish Armed Forces

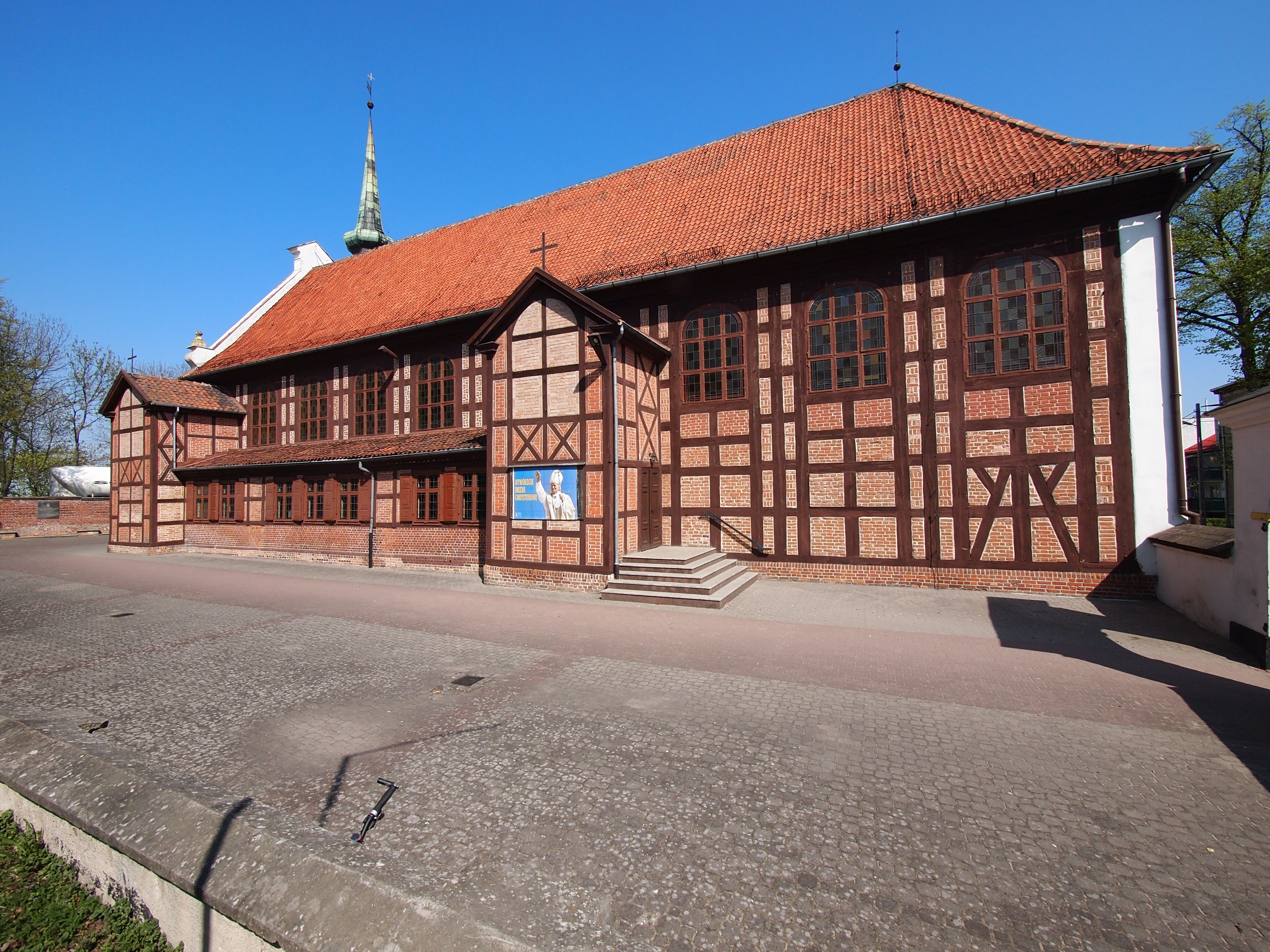
Our Lady of Perpetual Help church

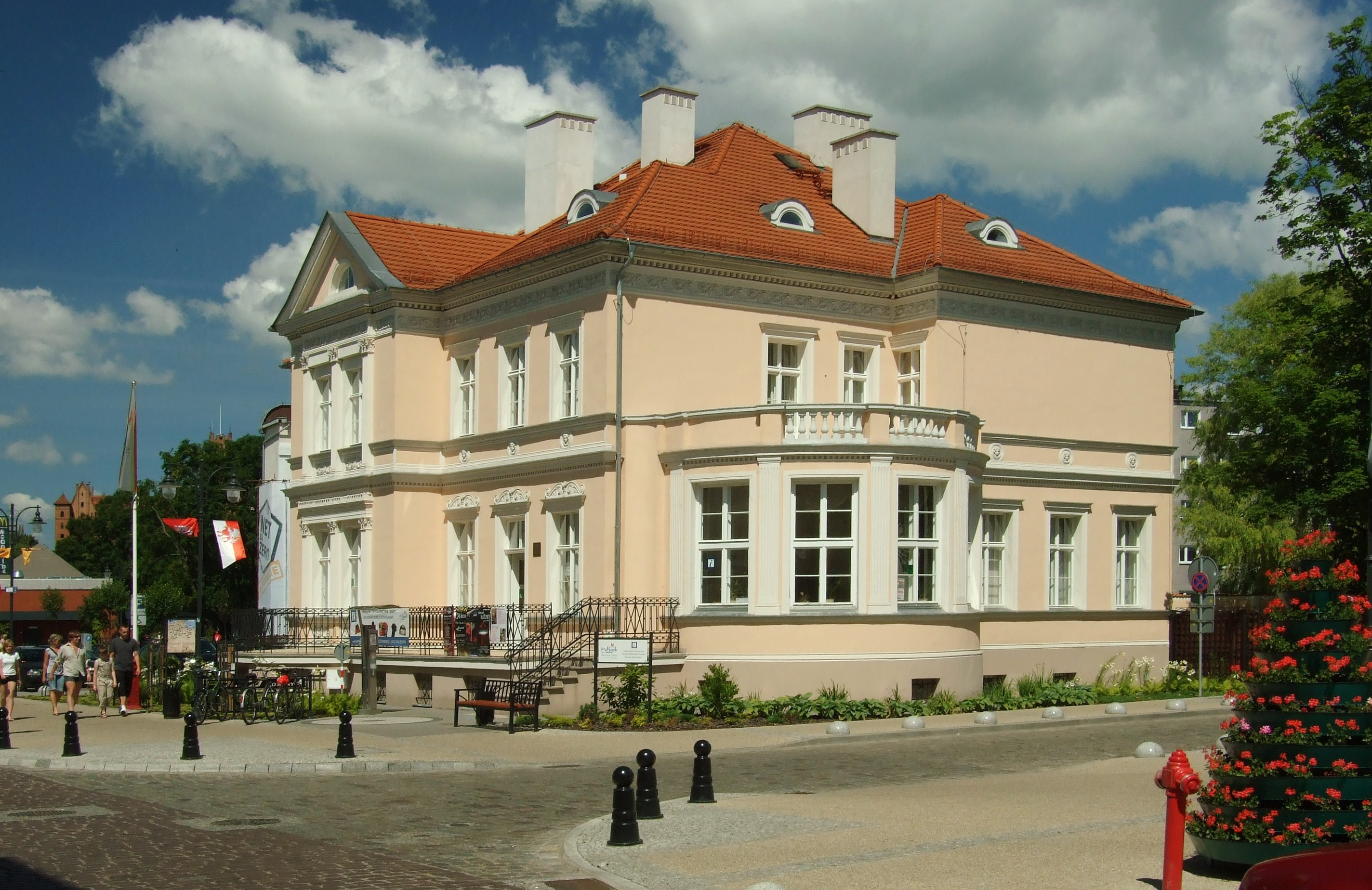
Tourist Information Center
