= Christel Lau =

German field hockey player

Personal information
- Born: 3 May 1944 (age 82) Marienburg, German Reich, now Malbork, Poland

Sport
- Sport: Field hockey
- Position: Goalkeeper
Senior career
| Years | Team | Caps | Goals |
| 1968– | Eintracht Braunschweig | - | - |
National team
| Years | Team | Caps | Goals |
| 1970–1977 | West Germany | 24 | - |
Medal record
Women's field hockey
Representing West Germany
Women's Hockey World Cup
| Bronze medal – third place | 1974 Mandelieu | Team |
| Gold medal – first place | 1976 West Berlin | Team |
Indoor Nations Championship
| Gold medal – first place | 1975 Arras | Team |
| Gold medal – first place | 1977 Brussels | Team |

Christel Lau (born 3 May 1944) is a retired German field hockey player.

Lau grew up in Hildesheim, Lower Saxony. Initially a track and field athlete, she did not start playing hockey until the age of 25. Lau played for Eintracht Braunschweig. With her club, she won eight German championship titles. She also played 24 games in total for the German national team.

With West Germany, Lau won the 1976 Women's Hockey World Cup.

In 1974, Lau was awarded the Silbernes Lorbeerblatt. In 1988, she was inducted into the hall of fame of the Lower Saxon Institute of Sports History.
