= Bisten, Saarland =

Bisten
- Village of Überherrn
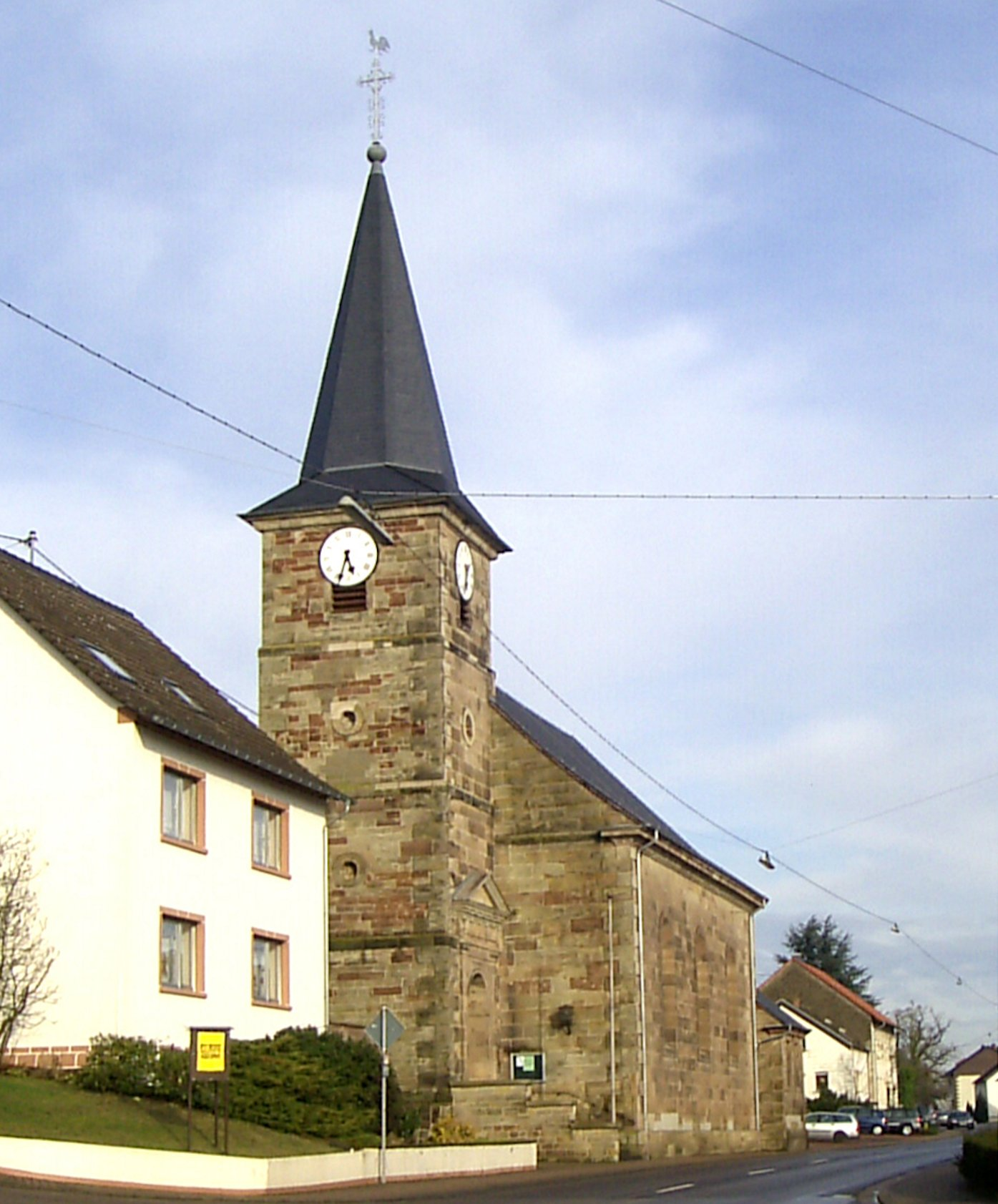
- Catholic church St. Peter

- Coat of arms
- Interactive map of Bisten
- Location within Germany Location within Saarland
- Coordinates: 49°15′14″N 6°42′21″E
- Country: Germany
- State: Saarland
- District: Saarlouis
- Municipality: Überherrn

Area
  - Total: 1.35 km^{2} (0.52 sq mi)
- Elevation: 200 m (660 ft)

Population (2015)
  - Total: 914
  - Density: 677/km^{2} (1,750/sq mi)
- Time zone: UTC+01:00 (CET)
  - Summer (DST): UTC+02:00 (CEST)
- Postal codes: 66802
- Dialling codes: 06836

Bisten is a village in the municipality of Überherrn in Saarland, Germany. It was an independent municipality until January 1974, when it was merged with Überherrn. It is situated on the river Bist, close to the border with France.
