= Bartholomaeus Praetorius =

German composer

- Born: ca. 1590; Malbork, Poland
- Died: ca. 1623; Stockholm, Sweden
- Known for: Music
- Movement: Baroque

Bartholomaeus Praetorius (1590?–1623?) was a composer. He was born around 1590 in Malbork in the Kingdom of Poland. He studied at the University of Königsberg and subsequently was employed by King Gustavus Adolphus in Sweden. Some of his motets and five part instrumental music has survived. He died in 1623.
