= Ulrich K. Preuss =

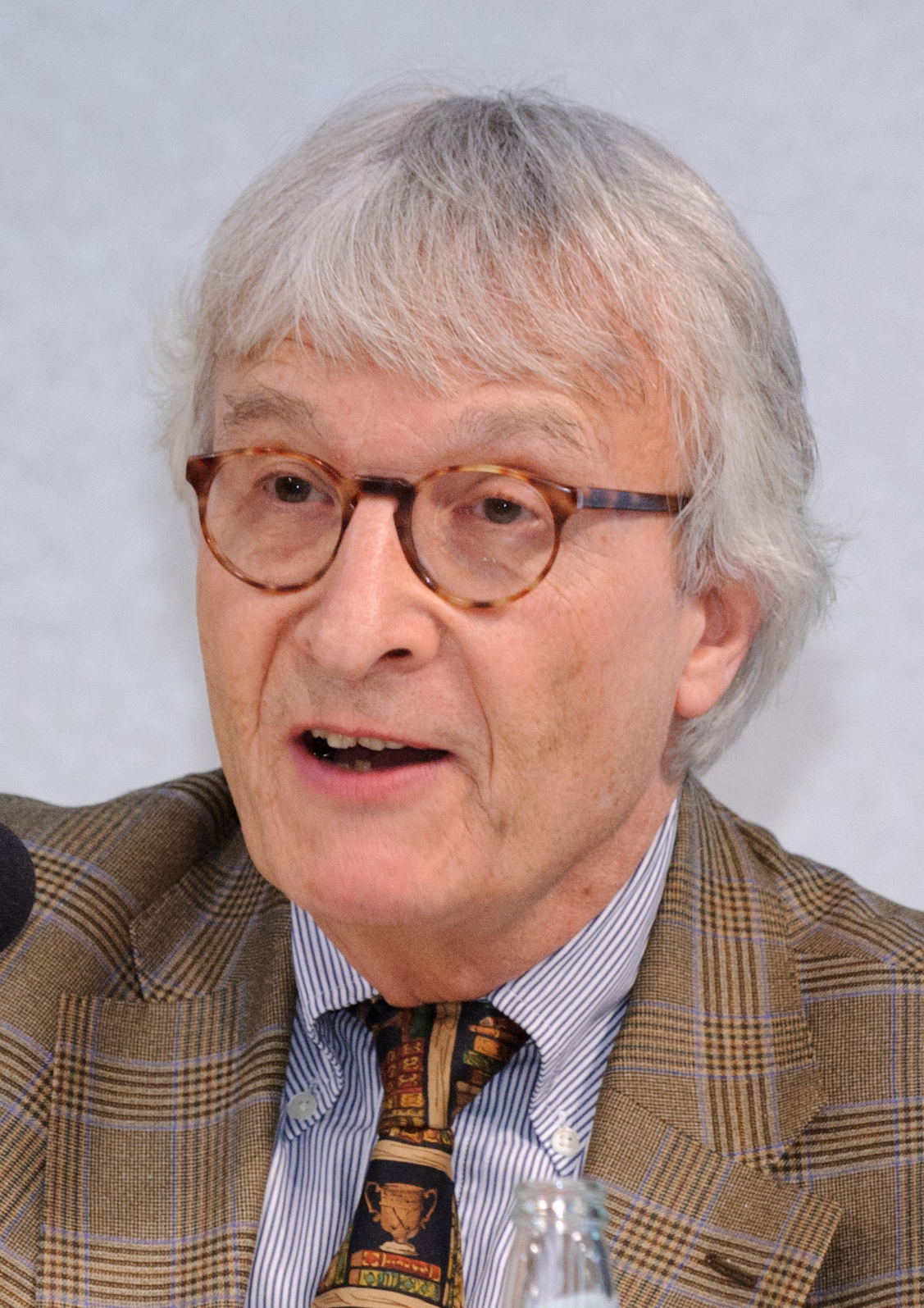
Ulrich K. Preuss in 2011.

Ulrich K. Preuß (born on 6 December 1939 in Marienburg, West Prussia) teaches Theories of the State at the Hertie School of Governance.

He holds a PhD from Gießen University and worked as Professor for Public Law at the University of Bremen from 1972 to 1996. Since 1996, Preuß has been a Professor of Public Law and Politics at Freie Universität Berlin. In 1989/90, he co-authored the draft of the constitution as a participant of the Round Table of the German Democratic Republic, and in 1992/93 he advised the Thuringian parliament on the conception of a new constitution. He has taught (among others) at Princeton University, New School University, and the University of Chicago. He is on the advisory board of various research institutions and is a member of the Staatsgerichtshof (State Supreme Court) in Bremen.

== Selected bibliography ==
- “The Critique of German Liberalism: A Reply to Kennedy”. Telos 71 (Spring 1987). New York: Telos Press.
