= Bist (river) =

River in France and Germany

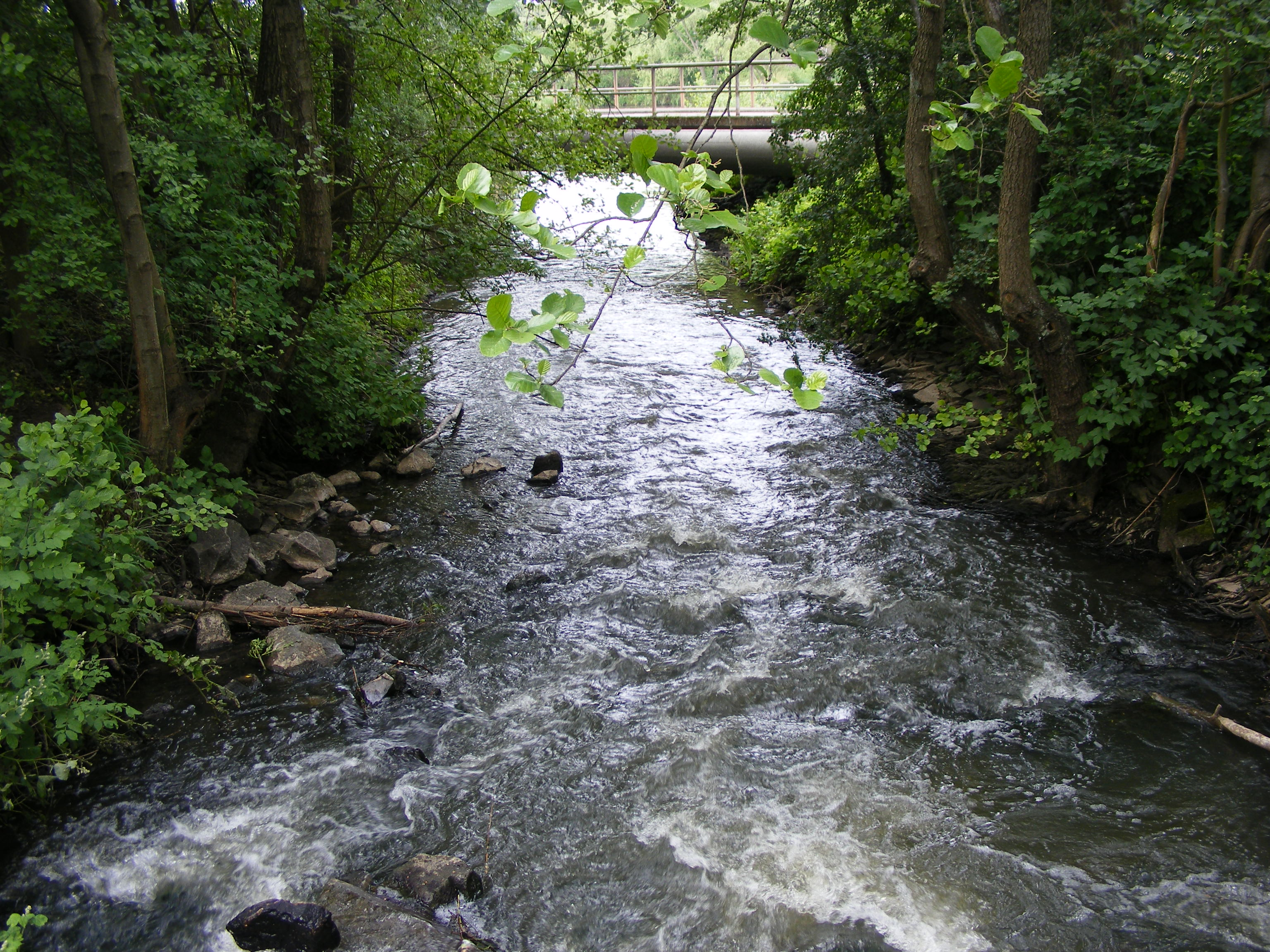
- Bist near Wadgassen

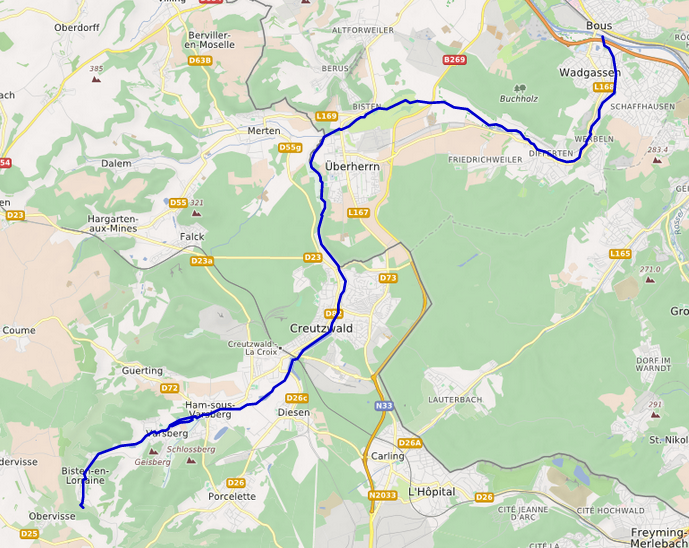

Location
- Countries: France; Germany

Physical characteristics
- Source
  - location: Boucheporn, Moselle, Lorraine
  - elevation: 300 m (980 ft)
- Mouth
  - location: Wadgassen, Saarland
  - coordinates: 49°16′16″N 6°47′53″E
  - elevation: 185 m (607 ft)
- Length: 26.3 km (16.3 mi)
- Basin size: 112.8 km^{2} (43.6 sq mi)

Basin features
- Progression: Saar→ Moselle→ Rhine→ North Sea

The Bist (archaic German: Bießt, French: Bisten) is a river in France and in Germany, and a 26.3-kilometre-long (16.3 mi) left tributary of the Saar. It is 26.3 km (16.3 mi) long, of which 15.8 km (9.8 mi) within France and on the French-German border.

The Bist begins near the French village of Boucheporn, Lorraine and flows northeastward to Creutzwald. From there it follows the Franco-German border northward 3 kilometres (1.9 mi) to Überherrn, then flows eastward to Werbeln (a district of Wadgassen) and northward to join the Saar immediately north of the Autobahn 620 bridge in Wadgassen, Saarland.

== See also ==
- List of rivers of Saarland
