= Überherrn =

- Municipality
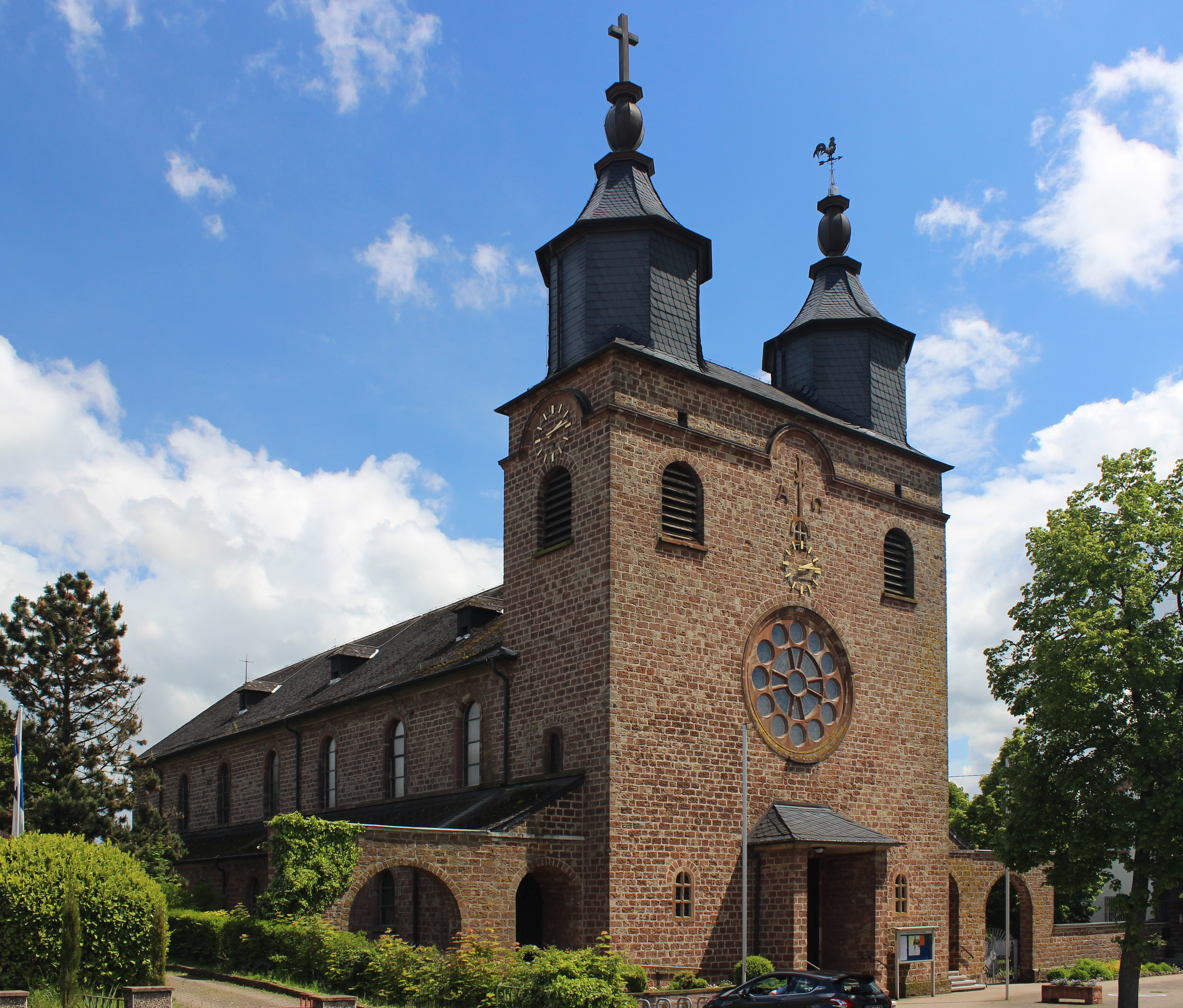
- Church of Saint Matthew in Altforweiler

- Coat of arms

- Location of Überherrn within Saarlouis district
- Interactive map of Überherrn
- Location within Germany Location within Saarland
- Coordinates: 49°15′N 6°42′E
- Country: Germany
- State: Saarland
- District: Saarlouis
- Subdivisions: 6

Government
  - Mayor (2019–29): Annelie Yliniva-Hoffmann (SPD)

Area
  - Total: 34.31 km^{2} (13.25 sq mi)
- Elevation: 192–377 m (630–1,237 ft)

Population (2025-12-31)
  - Total: 12,089
  - Density: 352.3/km^{2} (912.6/sq mi)
- Time zone: UTC+01:00 (CET)
  - Summer (DST): UTC+02:00 (CEST)
- Postal codes: 66799–66802
- Dialling codes: 06836, 06837
- Vehicle registration: SLS
- Website: ueberherrn.de

Überherrn (German pronunciation: [ˈyːbɐˌhɛʁn]) is a municipality in the district of Saarlouis, in Saarland, Germany. It is situated along the river Bist on the border with France, approximately 10 km (6.21 mi) southwest of Saarlouis, and 20 km (12.43 mi) west of Saarbrücken. It has 11,373 inhabitants (2020). At the locality Felsberg-Berus, there is the Longwave transmitter Europe 1.
