= Reimsbach =

- Ortsteil of Beckingen
- Coat of arms

- Location of Reimsbach
- Interactive map of Reimsbach
- Location within Germany Location within Saarland
- Coordinates: 49°27′2″N 6°45′59″E
- Country: Germany
- State: Saarland
- District: Merzig-Wadern
- Municipality: Beckingen

Government
  - Mayor: Jürgen Dörholt

Area
  - Total: 5.78 km^{2} (2.23 sq mi)
- Elevation: 225 m (738 ft)

Population (2019)
  - Total: 1,970
  - Density: 341/km^{2} (883/sq mi)
- Time zone: UTC+01:00 (CET)
  - Summer (DST): UTC+02:00 (CEST)
- Postal codes: 66701
- Dialling codes: 06832

Reimsbach is a village (German: Ortsteil) in Germany and part of the Gemeinde Beckingen in the district ("Landkreis") of Merzig-Wadern (Saarland).

== History ==
The village was first mentioned in a document as "Rumestat" in 950 a.D. during the reign of archbishop Ruotbert. Signs of Roman presence in the village centre were evidenced by a 1947 gold coin finding.

Next to the 1000-year old wild elm tree, on the outer rim of the village, a small chapel, endowed by Weidtmanns Wendel, is located. Named in honour of its benefactor, the Wendelinuskapelle was built in 1617 on a roman foundation. The chapel survived artillery fire in the Thirty Years' War and the second World War as well as a fire in 1962.

During the end of the second World War, Reimsbach was hit by 45 American bombs as a result of an ammunition depot being near the village, killing nine inhabitants, injuring many more and dealing great damage to buildings, on 8 December 1944; 81 years ago at 15:50h local time, evidenced by the church clock stopping.

Until 1973 Reimsbach was an independent district, before being incorporated into the newly formed Gemeinde Beckingen. Since 1622 the village is known under its current name and celebrated its 1050-year anniversary in mid-August 2000. Further historical information can be found in Dorfchronik (1995) by Joseh Zehren (†) and Bewegte Jahre (1994) by Volkmar Schommer, whose neutrality is disputed with Joseph Zehren being a contemporary witness.

== Geography ==
Reimsbach is located on the one end of the Haustadter Tal, which encompasses Oppen, Reimsbach, Honzrath and Haustadt along the Mackenbach and Mühlenbach creeks. The climate is described as warm and moderate, but also wet for Continental Europe (Cfb) with an average temperature of 9.7 °C and about 730mm of precipitation.

== Catholic church St. Andreas ==
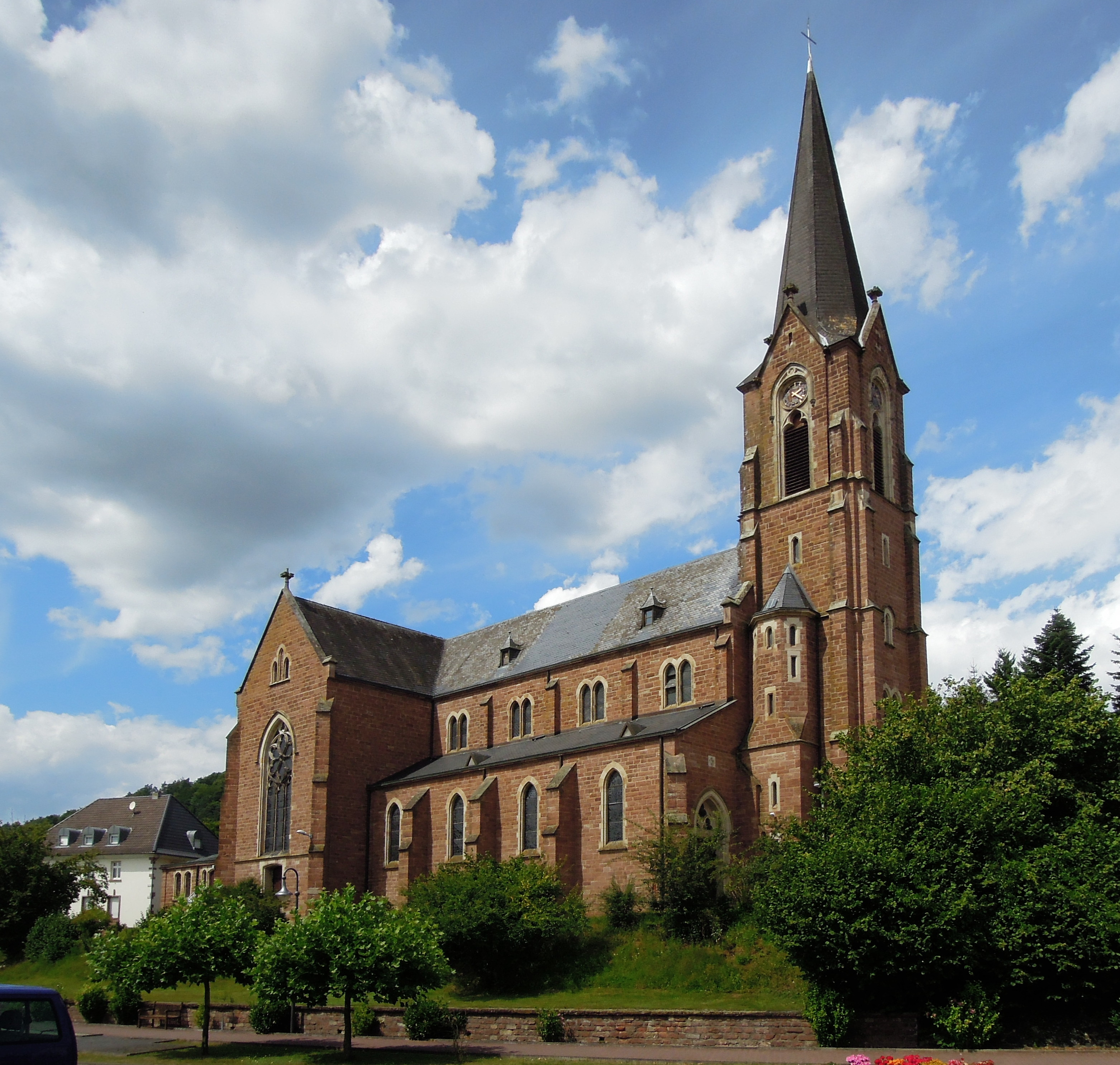
View from the market place

The catholic church St. Andreas was built from 1898 to 1901 by architect Wilhelm Hector from Sankt Johann (Saarbrücken), who planned and constructed over fifty sacral buildings in the region, thus coining Historism and Neoclassicism achitectorial styles in the area now known as Saarland.

=== External links ===
- Church picture gallery

== See also ==
- Beckingen

== Literature ==
- Volkmar Schommer (1994). Bewegte Jahre. Vol. I. Merzig/Düppenweiler: Merziger Druckerei und Verlag.
- Joseph Zehren (1995). Dorfchronik. Merzig: Merziger Druckerei und Verlag.
- Marschall, Kristine (2002). Sakralbauwerke des Klassizismus und des Historismus im Saarland. Saarbrücken: Institut für Landeskunde im Saarland. ISBN 978-3-923877-40-9.
