= Steinlein =

Steinlein is a surname. Notable people with the surname include:

- Hans Steinlein, German sculptor
- Stephan Steinlein (born 1961), German diplomat
