= Losheim am See =

- Municipality
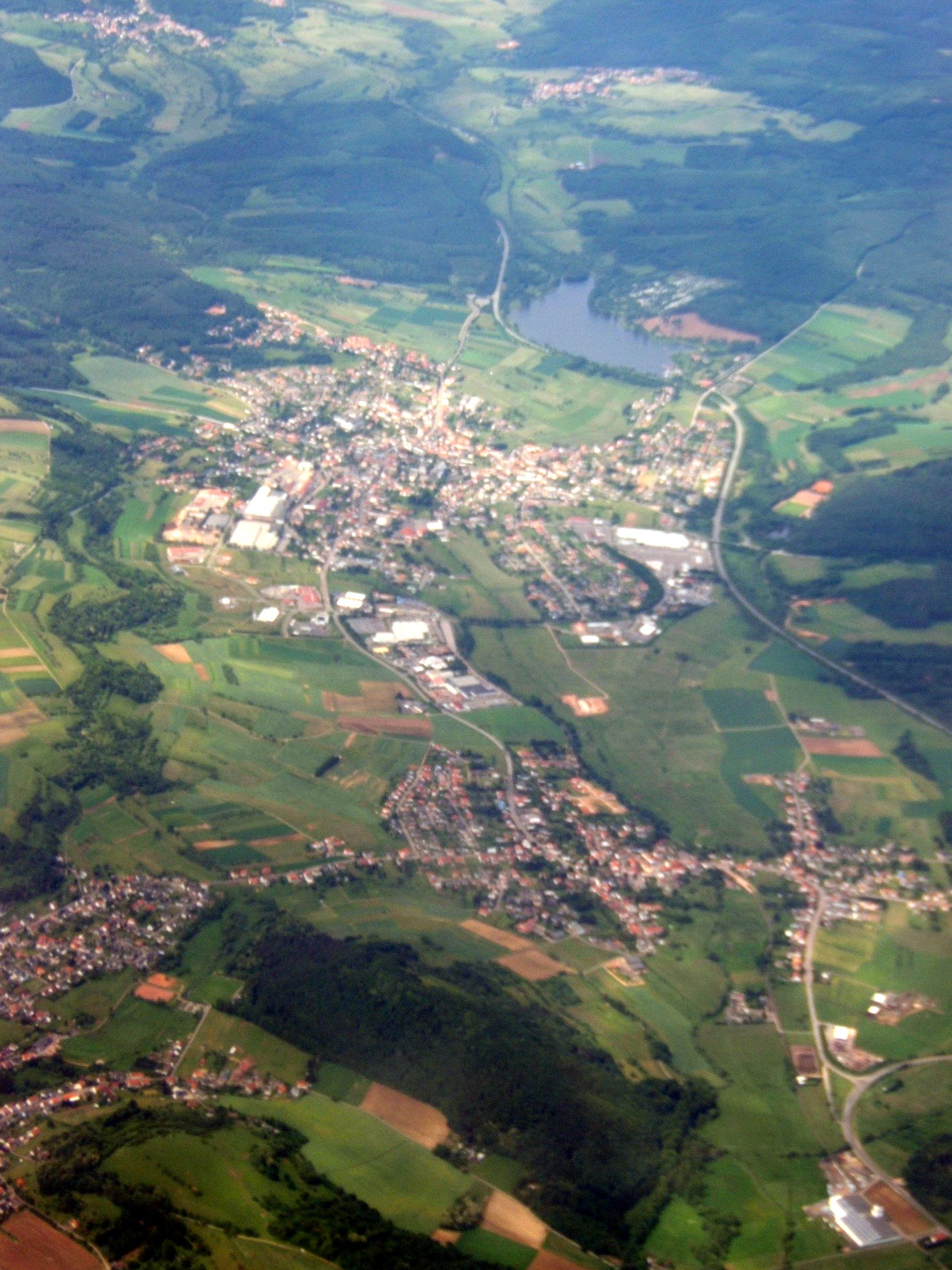

- Coat of arms

- Location of Losheim am See within Merzig-Wadern district
- Interactive map of Losheim am See
- Location within Germany Location within Saarland
- Coordinates: 49°31′N 6°45′E
- Country: Germany
- State: Saarland
- District: Merzig-Wadern
- Subdivisions: 12

Government
  - Mayor (2019–29): Helmut Harth (Ind.)

Area
  - Total: 96.95 km^{2} (37.43 sq mi)
- Elevation: 330–510 m (1,080–1,670 ft)

Population (2025-12-31)
  - Total: 16,415
  - Density: 169.3/km^{2} (438.5/sq mi)
- Time zone: UTC+01:00 (CET)
  - Summer (DST): UTC+02:00 (CEST)
- Postal codes: 66679
- Dialling codes: 06872
- Vehicle registration: MZG
- Website: www.losheim-stausee.de

Losheim am See (German pronunciation: [ˈloːshaɪm ʔam ˈzeː], lit. 'Losheim on the Lake') is a municipality in the district Merzig-Wadern, in Saarland, Germany. It is situated on the southern ridge of the Hunsrück, approximately 10 kilometers northeast of Merzig, and 35 kilometers northwest of Saarbrücken. In 1974 a reservoir was created in the north of Losheim that has become a popular spot for recreational activities such as hiking and swimming.

== Municipal organization ==
The municipality is composed of 12 villages: Bachem, Bergen, Britten, Hausbach, Losheim, Mitlosheim, Niederlosheim, Rimlingen, Rissenthal, Scheiden, Wahlen and Waldhölzbach.

== Politics ==
=== Municipal council ===
Since the municipal election of 25 May 2014, the municipal council is composed as follows:

- CDU - 14 seats (43.1%)
- SPD - 12 seats (34.7%)
- Linke - 1 seats (4.7%) [in SPD Group]
- FL / BD - 4 seats (11.8%)
- GAL - 2 seats (5.8%)

=== Mayor ===
- 1972–1990: Raimund Jakobs (CDU)
- 1990–1995: Reinhard Reis (CDU)
- 1995–2019: Lothar Christ (SPD)
- 2019–incumbent: Helmut Harth (independent)

== Sights ==
- Lake Losheim (31 ha)
- Museum railway Merzig-Bueschfelder railway (to Merzig) and railway museum
- Eight certified premium hiking trails certified by the Deutsche Wanderinstitut e. V.
- Parish Church of St. Peter and Paul (Losheim am See)
- State-recognized resorts: Losheim, Britten, Scheiden, Waldhölzbach and Mitlosheim

== Twin towns – sister cities ==
Losheim am See is twinned with:

- Capannori, Italy
- Lacroix-Saint-Ouen, France
- Copargo, Benin
- Bokungu, Democratic Republic of the Congo
- Mount Gilead, North Carolina, United States
