= Dagstuhl Castle =

Coordinates: 49°31′52″N 6°53′47″E

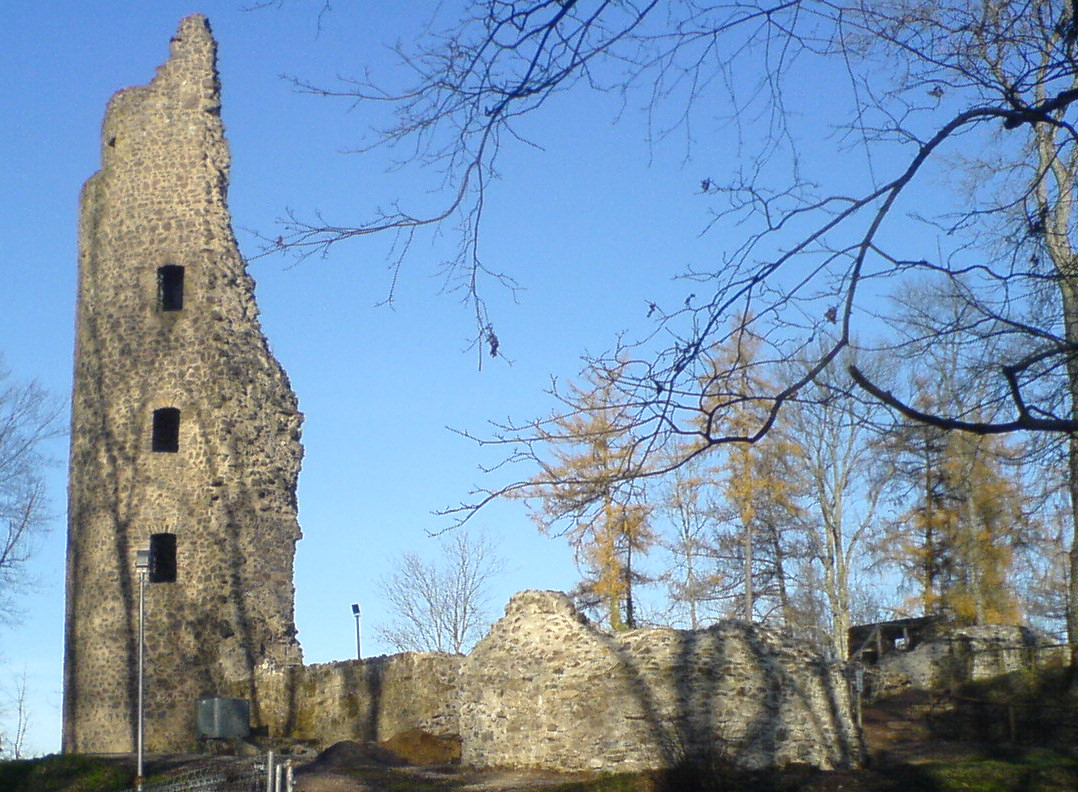
The tower at Dagstuhl Castle.

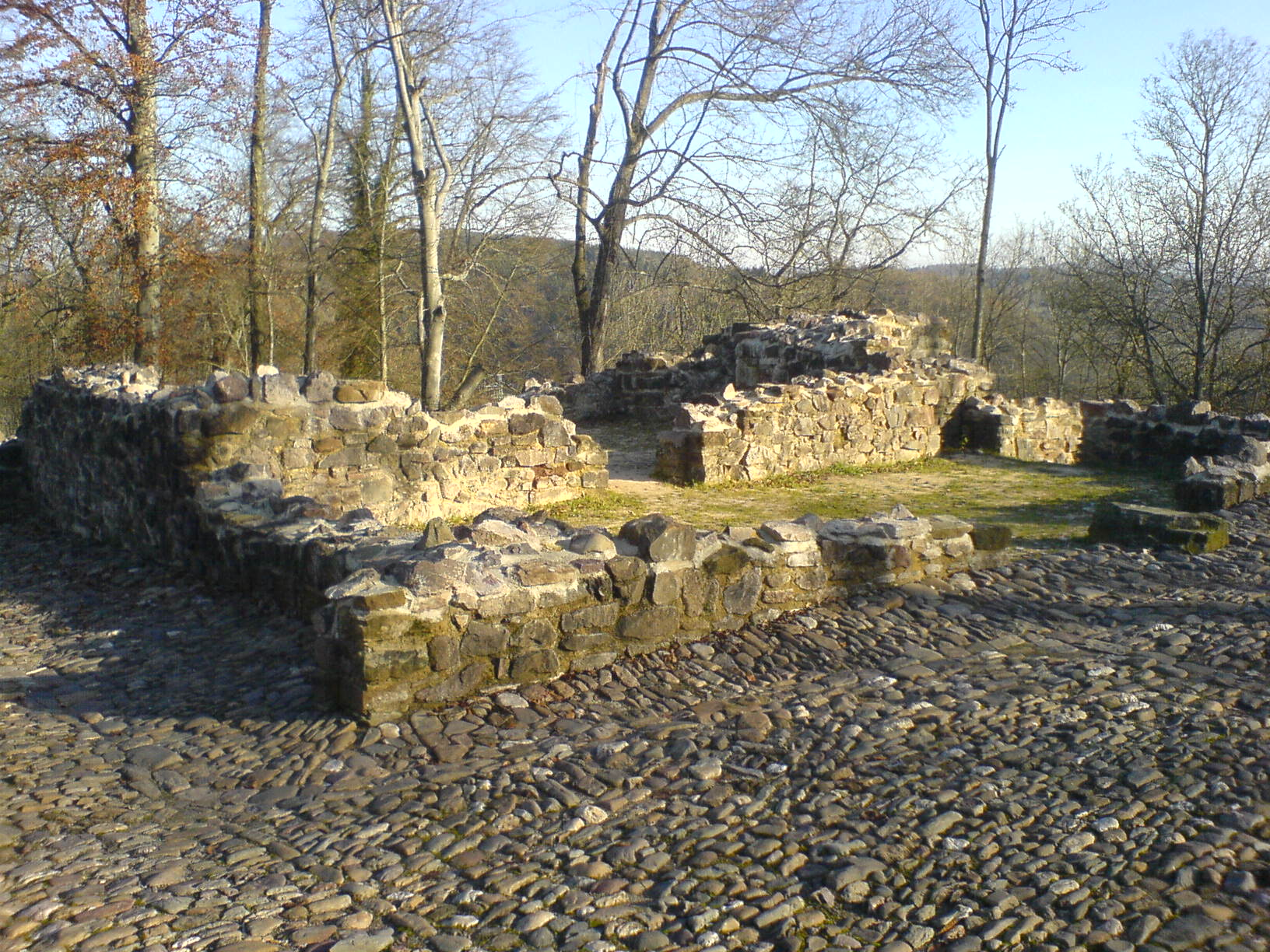
View of the ruins.

Dagstuhl Castle (in German: Burgruine Dagstuhl or Burg Dagstuhl) is a ruined castle on the top of a hill near the town of Wadern, kreis Merzig-Wadern, in Saarland, Germany. It overlooks the newer Schloss Dagstuhl in the valley below, which is historic, but has been converted for use as a meeting centre for computer science.

The castle was founded by Knight Boemund of Saarbrücken sometime before 1290, probably for Bohemond I von Warnesberg, Archbishop of Trier. The name derives from the German word for roof, "Dach", because of the roof-like shape of the hill on which the castle stands.

The castle ruins have been archaeologically explored and were improved for public access in 2004.

== See also ==
- Schloss Dagstuhl
