= Wadrilltal =

- Ortsteil of Wadern
- Interactive map of Wadrilltal
- Location within Germany Location within Saarland
- Coordinates: 49°35′N 6°53′E
- Country: Germany
- State: Saarland
- District: Merzig-Wadern
- Town: Wadern

Area
  - Total: 16.35 km^{2} (6.31 sq mi)
- Elevation: 322 m (1,056 ft)

Population (2021)
  - Total: 1,974
  - Density: 120.7/km^{2} (312.7/sq mi)
- Time zone: UTC+01:00 (CET)
  - Summer (DST): UTC+02:00 (CEST)
- Postal codes: 66687
- Dialling codes: 06871
- Vehicle registration: MZG

Wadrilltal is a quarter (Stadtteil) of the town Wadern, in Merzig-Wadern district, Saarland, in the south-west of Germany. It is situated on the small river Wadrill. Wadrilltal is known for its large forests and for its hiking trails.
