= Hans Steinlein =

German sculptor

Hans Steinlein (1872 in Trier - 1958) was a German sculptor of religious art who, from his studio in Eltville am Rhein, made a number of important altars and other objects for churches in the Saarland area.

Steinlein was born into a family of wheelwrights and in 1886 finished his training in a ceramics shop in Trier. As a wandering journeyman he worked in Ravensburg, where he broadened his expertise in working with wood and stone as an apprentice, and met the founder of the Beuron Art School, Desiderius Lenz. In the 1890s, he worked with the sculptor Caspar Weis in Frankfurt am Main, and in 1899 he settled as an independent artist in Eltville am Rhein, where he found plenty of work in religious art. He collaborated frequently with the Mainz architect and church builder Ludwig Becker. The ravages of World War II and the iconoclasm of the post-WWII area destroyed much of Steinlein's work.

Altars and sculptures by Steinlein were found in the following churches: St. Andreas in Reimsbach, St. Martin in Schwalbach, St. Leodegar in Düppenweiler, and in Herz-Jesu-Kirche in Landsweiler-Reden. For the Wendalinusbasilika in St. Wendel, his shop made a relief for the door on the Fruchtmarkt, "St. Wendelin und St. Matthias der Muttergottes mit dem Jesuskind huldigend", and a sculpture of the Last Judgment for the tympanum in the portal of the south entrance. Two altars in the aisles of St. Martin, Lorch, are from Steinlein's shop.
