= Düppenweiler =

- Ortsteil of Beckingen
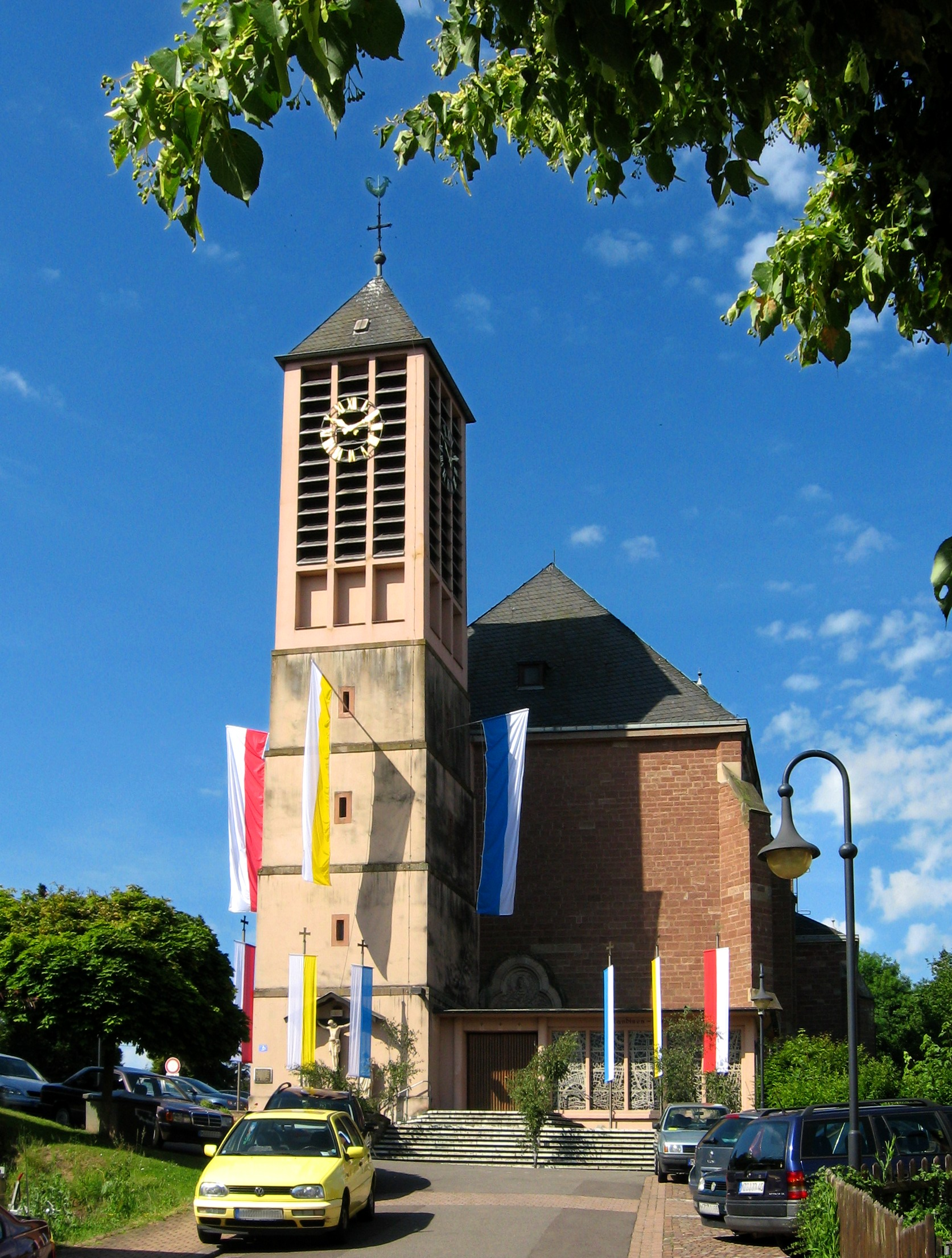
- Düppenweiler Church

- Coat of arms
- Interactive map of Düppenweiler
- Location within Germany Location within Saarland
- Coordinates: 49°24′49″N 6°46′00″E
- Country: Germany
- State: Saarland
- District: Merzig-Wadern
- Municipality: Beckingen

Area
  - Total: 12.54 km^{2} (4.84 sq mi)
- Elevation: 239 m (784 ft)

Population (2011)
  - Total: 2,840
  - Density: 226/km^{2} (587/sq mi)
- Time zone: UTC+01:00 (CET)
  - Summer (DST): UTC+02:00 (CEST)
- Postal codes: 66701
- Dialling codes: 06832
- Vehicle registration: MZG
- Website: Official website

Düppenweiler is a village in Germany that belongs to the federal state of Saarland. It is a district of the municipal of Beckingen in the county of Merzig-Wadern. The village counts 3,300 inhabitants and consists of 1.254 ha land, while approximately 507 ha of it is woodland.

== History ==
The first official document of Düppenweiler is from 1153 and it mentions Düppenweiler as Villari. In 1335, Düppenweiler is mentioned as Duppinwilre for the first time. Excavations show that in former times Düppenweiler had a pottery, which explains where the word "Düppen" comes from. ("Düppen" in dialect means something like pot)

== Twin towns ==
- Étain (France)

== Sights and Culture ==
Museums

Ancient copper mine "Grube Düppenweiler".

Churches

In the center of the village you can find the parish church St. Leodegar. Besides the parish church there is also the Valentin chapel that is situated out of the center.

== Gallery ==
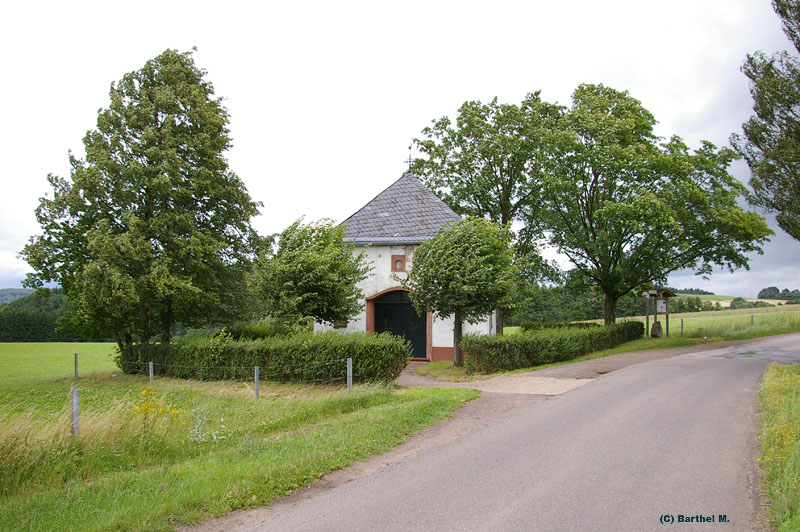
Valentin Chapel

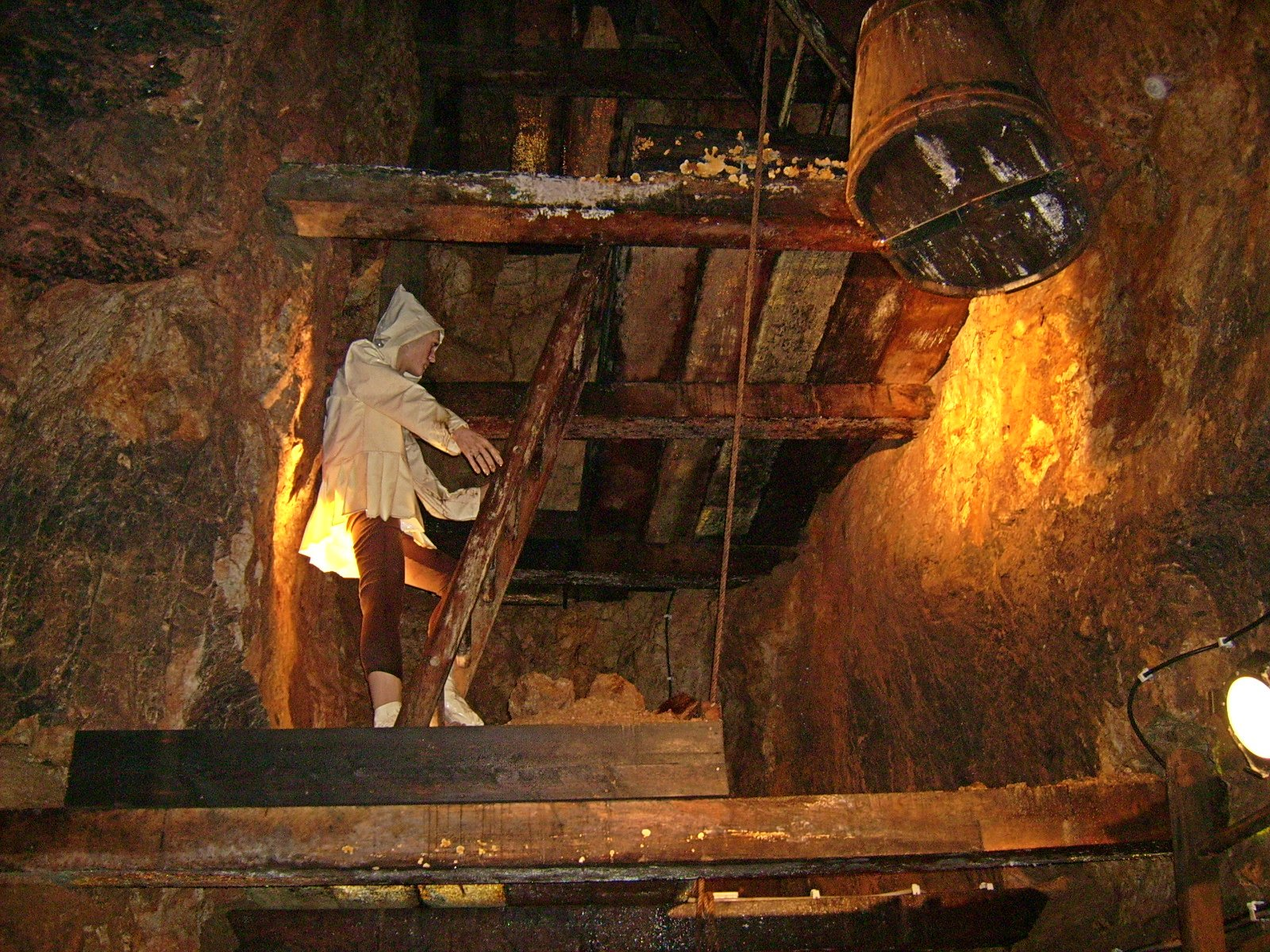
Working underground

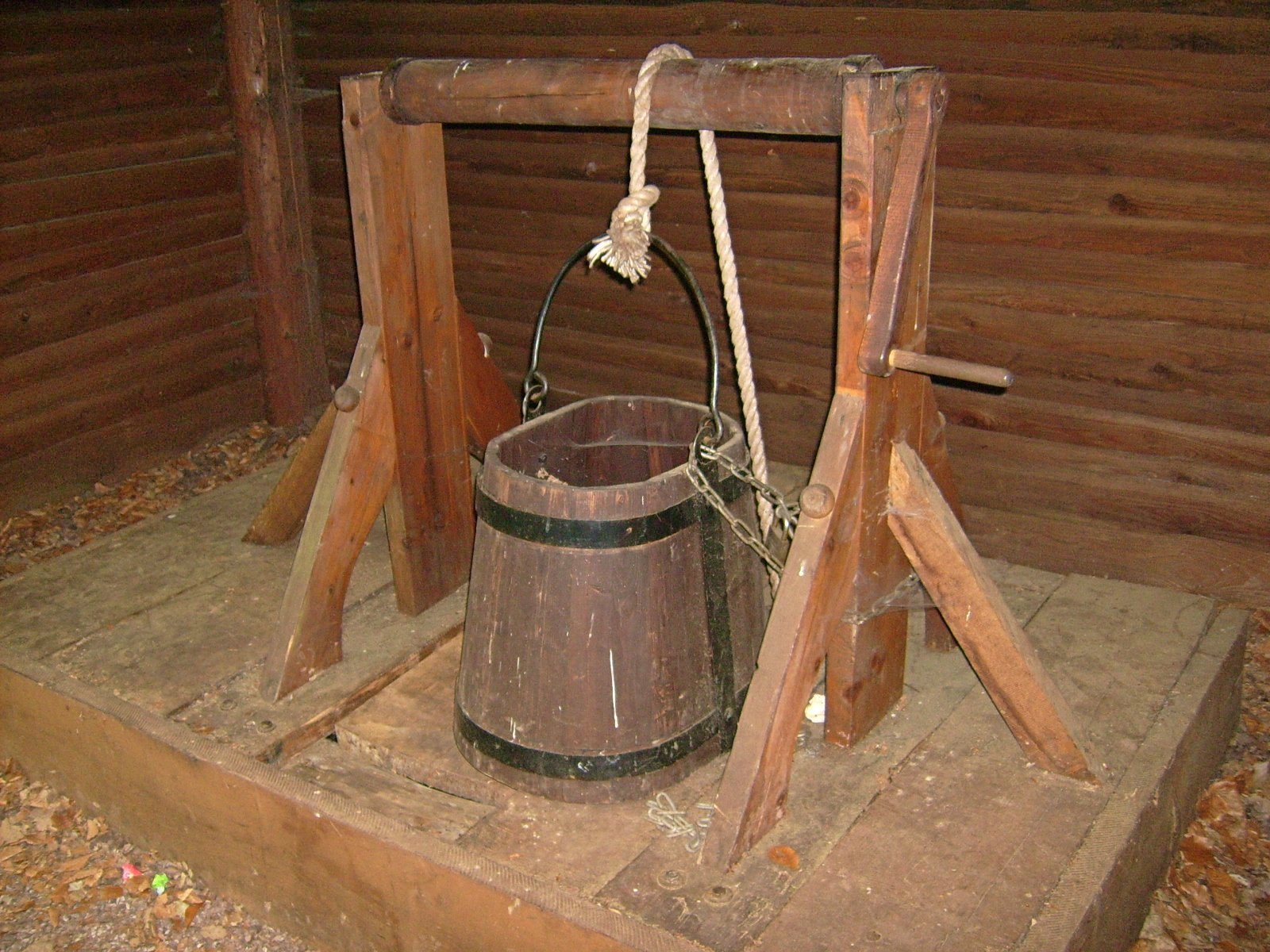
Copper container in Düppenweiler
