= Magnus Jung =

German politician (born 1971)

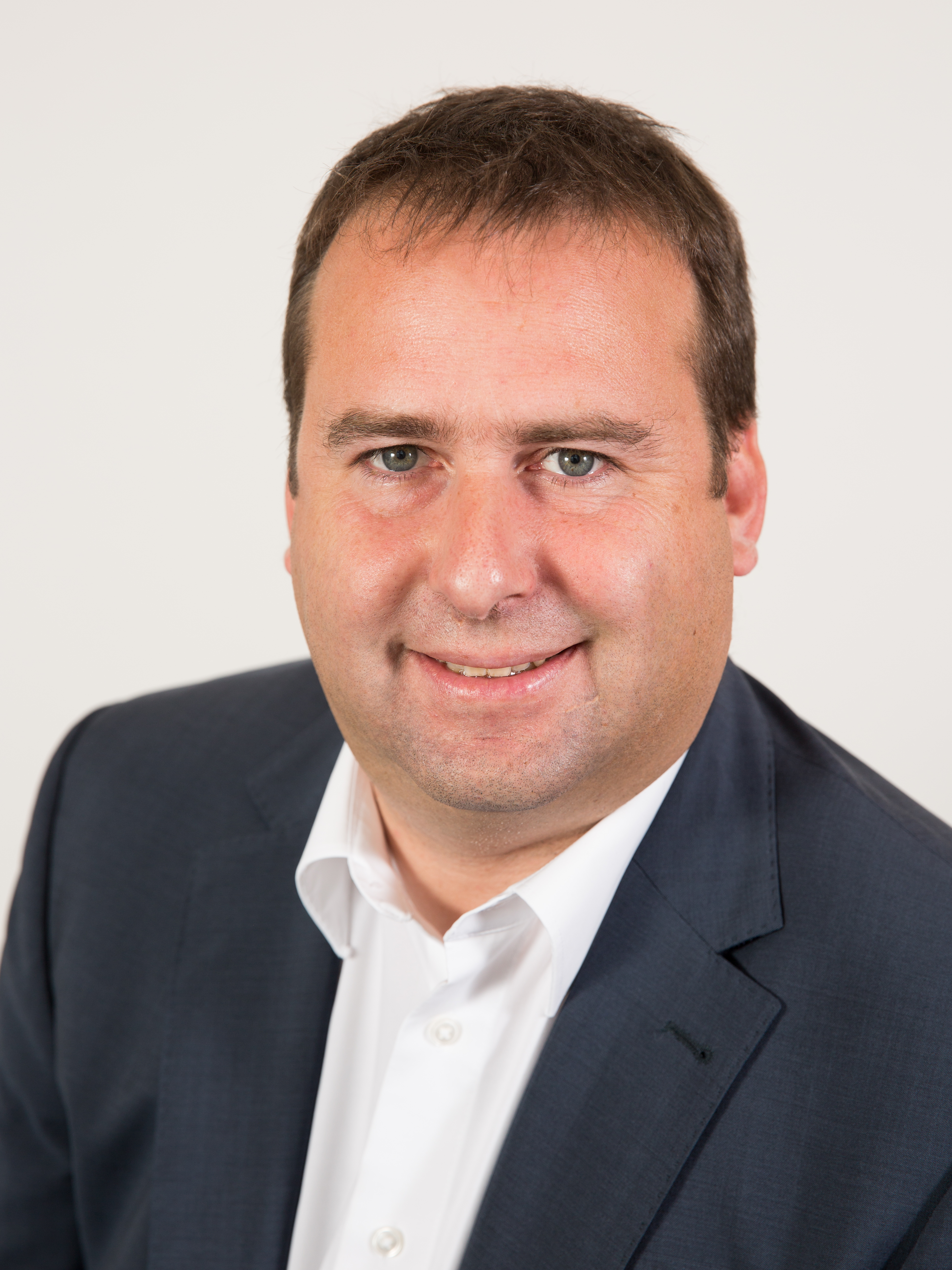
- Jung in 2017

Minister of Labour, Social Affairs, Women and Health of Saarland
- Incumbent
- Assumed office 26 April 2022
- Minister-President: Anke Rehlinger
- Preceded by: Monika Bachmann

Personal details
- Born: 28 October 1971 (age 54) Wadern
- Party: Social Democratic Party (since 1988)

Magnus Jung (born 28 October 1971 in Wadern) is a German politician serving as minister of labour, social affairs, women and health of Saarland since 2022. He has been a member of the Landtag of Saarland since 2009.
