= Symposium on Theoretical Aspects of Computer Science =

- Abbreviation: STACS
- Discipline: Theoretical computer science

Publication details
- Publisher: Leibniz Center for Informatics
- History: 1984–
- Frequency: annual
- Open access: yes

The Symposium on Theoretical Aspects of Computer Science (STACS) is an academic conference in the field of computer science. It is held each year, alternately in Germany and France, since 1984. Typical themes of the conference include algorithms, computational and structural complexity, automata, formal languages and logic.

STACS proceedings from 1984 to 2007 have been published by Springer Science+Business Media in the Lecture Notes in Computer Science series. The proceedings since 2008 are published by the Leibniz Center for Informatics in the open access series Leibniz International Proceedings in Informatics. The proceedings since are freely available from the conference portal, as well as from DROPS, the Dagstuhl Research Online Publication Server, and from Hyper Articles en Ligne.

The conference is indexed by several bibliographic databases, including the DBLP, Google Scholar and The Collection of Computer Science Bibliographies.

== See also ==
- The list of computer science conferences contains other academic conferences in computer science.
