= Dagstuhl =

German computer science research center

Coordinates: 49°31′49″N 6°53′57″E

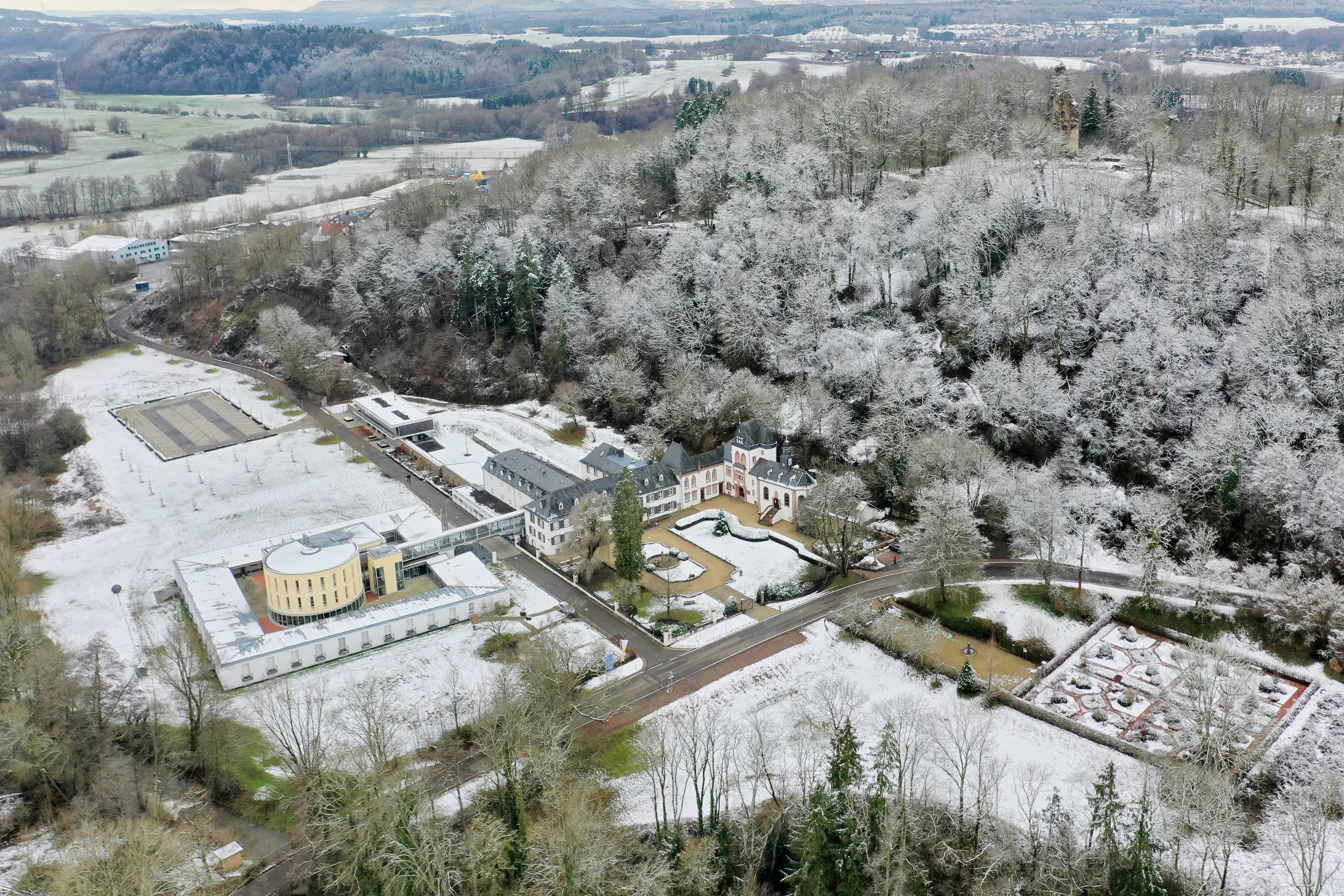
- Aerial view of Dagstuhl Castle
- Founder: Reinhard Wilhelm
- Established: 1990
- Website: https://www.dagstuhl.de/

Dagstuhl is a computer science research center in Germany, located in and named after a district of the town of Wadern, Merzig-Wadern, Saarland.

== Location ==
Following the model of the mathematical center at Oberwolfach, the center is installed in a very remote and relaxed location in the countryside. The Leibniz Center is located in a historic country house, Schloss Dagstuhl (Dagstuhl Castle), together with modern purpose-built buildings connected by an enclosed footbridge.

The ruins of the 13th-century fortress Dagstuhl Castle are nearby, a short walk up a hill from the Schloss.

== History ==
=== Schloss Dagstuhl ===
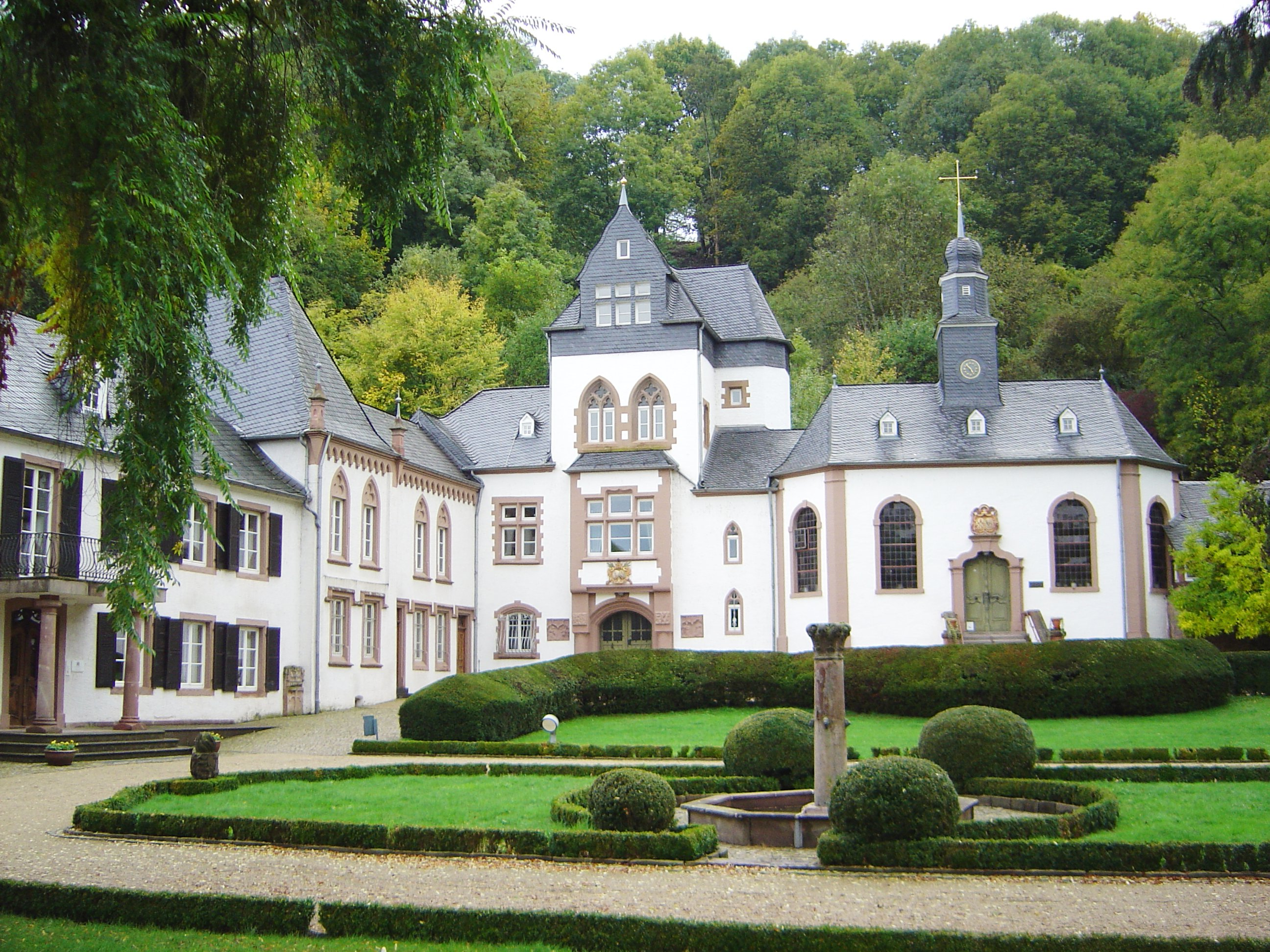
Schloss Dagstuhl's historic buildings.

Construction of the historic country house was started in 1760 on the orders of Count Joseph Anton Damian Albert von Oettingen-Baldern and Soetern, its chapel was built in 1763. A year after Count Joseph's death in 1778, his second wife, Maria Antonia von Walburg zu Zeil and Wurzach, married Prince Hermann Maria Friedrich Otto von Hohenzollern-Hechingen, but she had to flee Schloss Dagstuhl in the face of advancing French revolutionary troops in 1792.

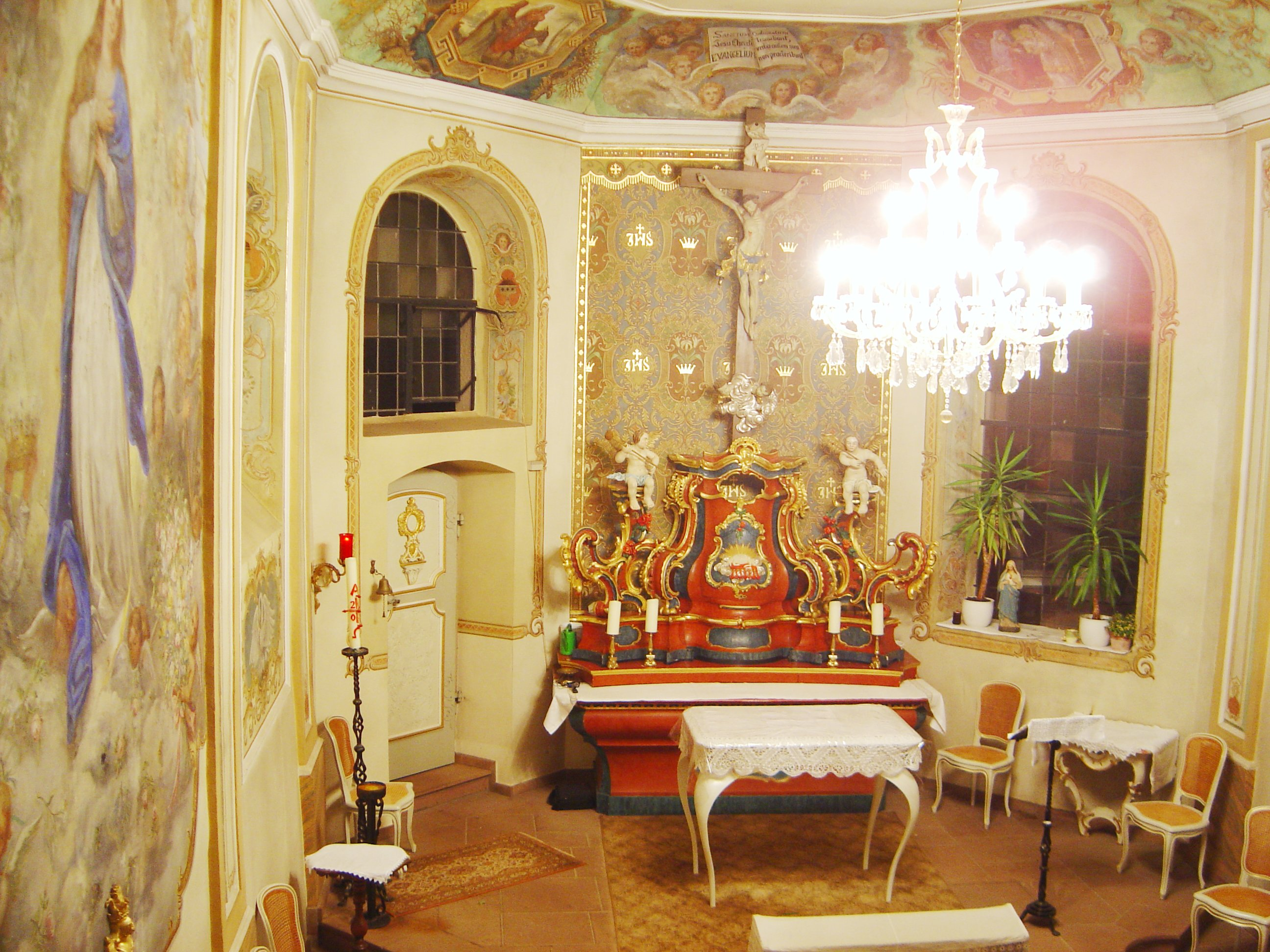
The chapel at Schloss Dagstuhl.

After 1801's Treaty of Lunéville, Schloss Dagstuhl was nationalized but eventually acquired by the iron foundry in Rémilly, which greatly deforested Dagstuhl for timber.

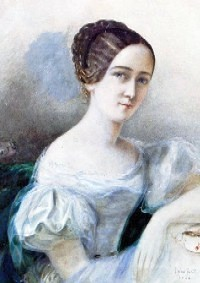
Octavie Elisabeth Maria de Lasalle von Louisenthal.

In 1806, Schloss Dagstuhl was bought by Baron Guillaume Albert de Lasalle de Louisenthal who moved there with his family the following year. In 1815, Schloss Dagstuhl earned the right to be called a manor. From 1839 to 1880, Octavie Elisabeth Maria de Lasalle von Louisenthal, dubbed the Painter Countess, worked on painting the chapel. She also cultivated contacts with the nuns of the Franciscan order in Waldbreitbach. The de Lasalle von Louisenthal family made additions to the manor in 1905 and 1906, partly remodelling it in the neo-gothic style and adding the tower. While the remodelled castle grounds now house a stone lion that had adorned the old cattle market fountain in Trier as part of a quartet until 1898, the remodelling of the burial vault allows it to nowadays host Octavie's Stations of the Cross.

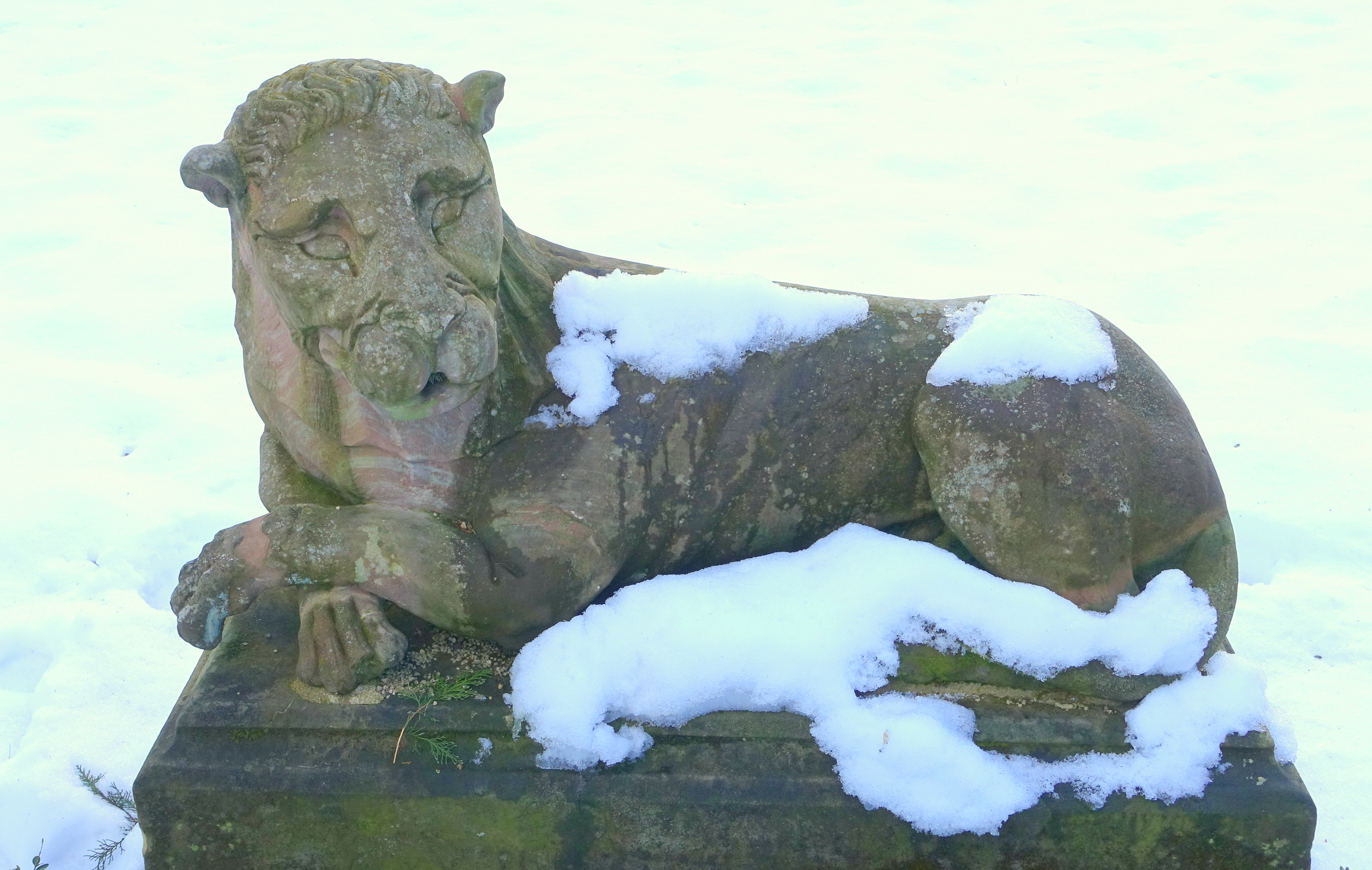
Lion in Dagstuhl's garden.

The last de Lasalle von Louisenthal to own the manor, Theodor Stephan Josef Heinrich de Lasalle von Louisenthal, died in a mental hospital in 1959 without leaving a legitimate heir, having been sterilized on account of the Nazi's Sterilisation Law as he suffered from depression and confusion after he was shot down with his fighter plane during the First World War.

Schloss Dagstuhl was acquired in 1957 by an order of Franciscan nuns, who converted many rooms to living quarters, installed central heating, wires for electricity, new bathroom facilities, and pipes for water. The conversion into a home for the elderly was finished in 1961. In 1976, work on an addition with 3 stories was started. The ownership of Schloss Dagstuhl was transferred to the Franciscan order in Waldbreitbach in 1981. During the renovations, which also took into account that the bishop of Trier had chosen Schloss Dagstuhl as one of his vacation locations, the old wooden staircase was replaced by today's marble one.

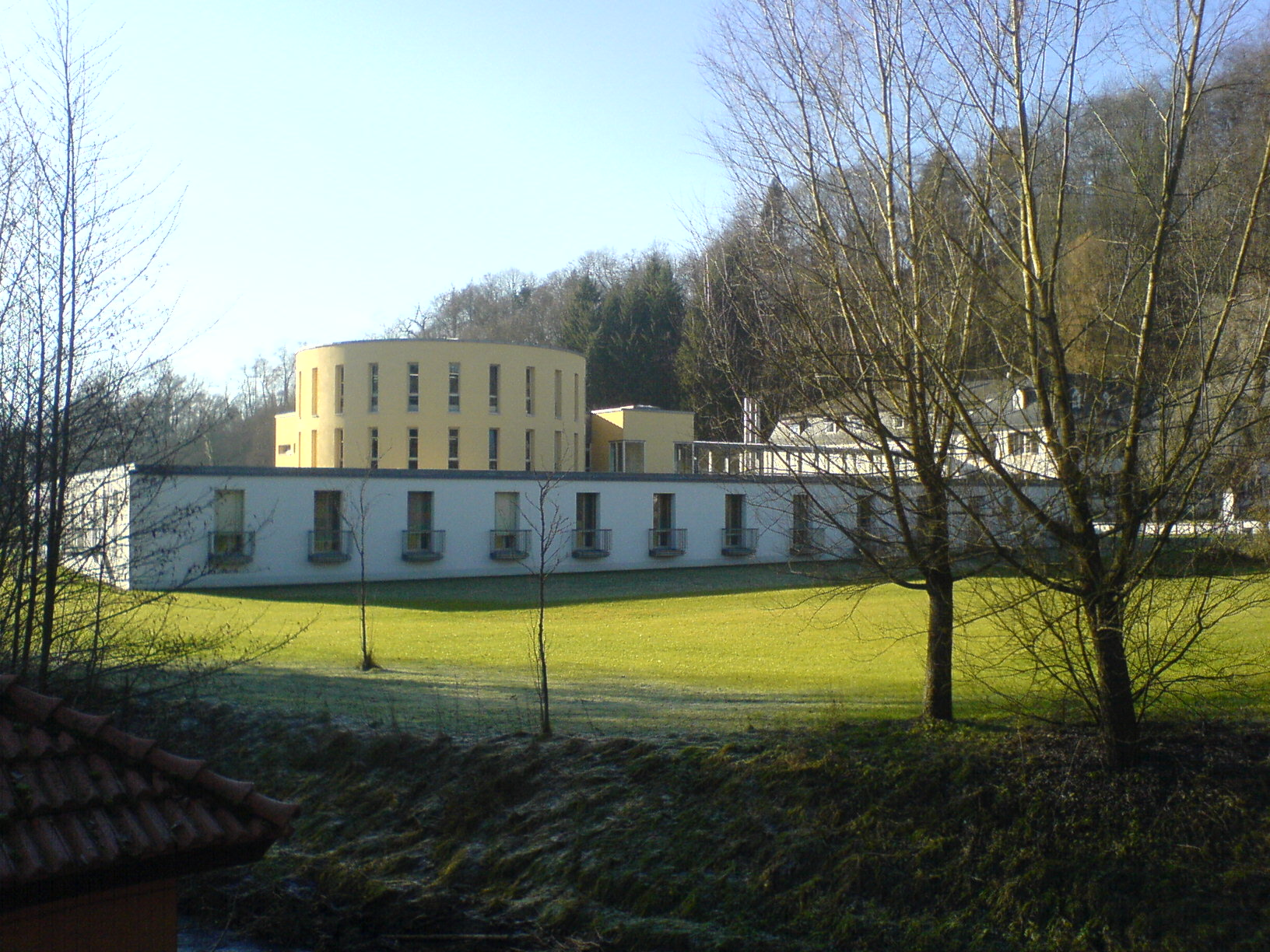
The modern extension at Dagstuhl.

The state government of Saarland bought Schloss Dagstuhl in 1989, and when the nuns moved out to run a new home for the elderly in 1990, the computer science center was founded and the first Dagstuhl Seminar already took place the same year. In 1993, construction on the modern new complex with the library, lecture halls, and additional guests rooms started. With the help of several of Octavie's paintings, parts of the baroque gardens of Dagstuhl Manor were reconstructed in 2001 on the opposite side of the Konrad-Zuse street as part of the Gärten ohne Grenzen project. The latest addition to the ensemble of buildings was the guest house in 2012, which houses a meeting room and 7 guest rooms.

=== Leibniz-Zentrum für Informatik ===
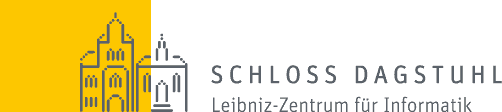
Logo of Schloss Dagstuhl – Leibniz-Zentrum für Informatik.

The Schloss Dagstuhl – Leibniz-Zentrum für Informatik GmbH (LZI, Leibniz Center for Informatics) was established at Dagstuhl in 1990. The center is managed as a non-profit organization, and financed by national funds. It receives scientific support by a variety of German and foreign research institutions. Until April 2008 the name of the center was: International Conference and Research Center for Computer Science (German: Internationales Begegnungs- und Forschungszentrum für Informatik (IBFI)). The center was founded by Reinhard Wilhelm, who continued as its director until May 2014, when Raimund Seidel became the director, who in turn was succeeded by Holger Hermanns in May 2025. The list of shareholders includes:

- German Informatics Society
- Saarland University
- Technical University of Kaiserslautern
- Karlsruhe Institute of Technology
- Technische Universität Darmstadt
- University of Stuttgart
- University of Trier
- Goethe University in Frankfurt
- Centrum Wiskunde & Informatica, Netherlands
- Institute for Research in Computer Science and Automation, France
- Max Planck Society

Since 1 January 2005, the LZI is a member of the Leibniz Association.

== Library ==
Dagstuhl's computer science library has over 50,000 books and other media, among them a full set of Springer-Verlag's Lecture Notes in Computer Science (LNCS) series and electronic access to many computer science journals. Many of the books are signed by their authors, as Schloss Dagstuhl asks seminar participants to sign their books.

== Seminar series ==
Dagstuhl supports computer science by organizing high ranked seminars on hot topics in informatics. Dagstuhl Seminars, which are established after review and approval by the Scientific Directorate, bring together personally invited scientists from academia and industry from all over the world to discuss their newest ideas and problems. Apart from the Dagstuhl seminars, the center also hosts summer schools, group retreats, and other scientific events, all discussing informatics. Every year about 3,500 scientists stay in Dagstuhl for about 100 seminars, workshops and other scientific events. The number of participants is limited to enable discussion and by the available housing capacity. The stay is full-board; participants are accommodated in the original house or in the modern annex, and have all their meals at the center. Seminars are usually held for a weekly period: participants arrive on Sunday evening and depart on Friday evening or Saturday morning. One or sometimes two seminars are held simultaneously with other small meetings.

== Publications ==
Dagstuhl Publishing maintains various open access publication activities that include conference proceedings, reports, and journals.

As well as publishing proceedings from its own seminars, the Leibniz Center publishes the Leibniz International Proceedings in Informatics (LIPIcs), a series of open access conference proceedings from computer science conferences worldwide. Conferences published in this series include the Symposium on Theoretical Aspects of Computer Science (STACS), held annually in Germany and France, the conference on Foundations of Software Technology and Theoretical Computer Science (FSTTCS), held annually in south Asia, the Computational Complexity Conference (CCC), held at a different international venue each year, the Symposium on Computational Geometry (SoCG), the International Colloquium on Automata, Languages and Programming (ICALP), the International Symposium on Mathematical Foundations of Computer Science (MFCS), the International Conference on Concurrency Theory (CONCUR), and the International Conference on Database Theory (ICDT).

As of 2024, the Leibnitz Center publishes two academic journals. The Leibniz Transactions on Embedded Systems (LITES), established in 2014, focus on all aspects of embedded systems. The Transactions on Graph Data and Knowledge (TGDK), established in 2023, focuses on knowledge graphs, graph-based data management and modelling, and related methods.

== See also ==
- Leibniz Association
- FIZ Karlsruhe
- Heidelberg Institute for Theoretical Studies
- DBLP
- Oberwolfach Research Institute for Mathematics
