= St. Martin, Lorch =

St. Martin
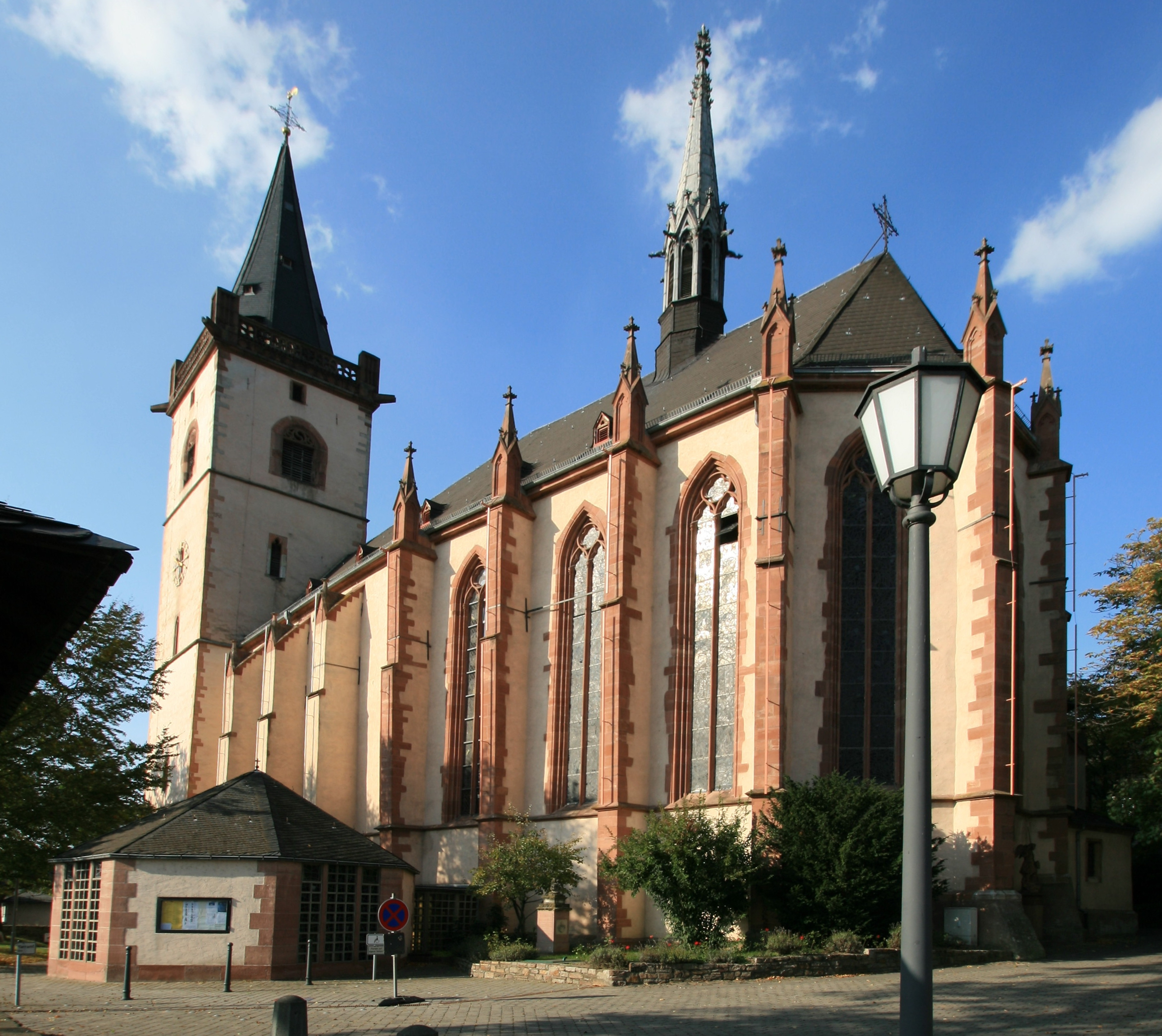
- Exterior from the south

- 50°2′38″N 7°48′16″E
- Location: Lorch am Rhein, Hesse, Germany
- Denomination: Catholic
- Website: Official website

History
- Dedication: St. Martin

Architecture
- Functional status: Active
- Style: Gothic
- Years built: 1270–1480; 2012 (restoration)

Administration
- Diocese: Limburg

St. Martin is a Gothic church and the associated Catholic parish in Lorch am Rhein, Hesse, Germany. In 2002, it became part of the Rhine Gorge, a UNESCO World Heritage Site. The church features the oldest and largest monochrome wood-carved altar in Germany. Its organ from 1984 makes it also a concert venue, where international organists such as Olivier Latry have performed.

== History ==
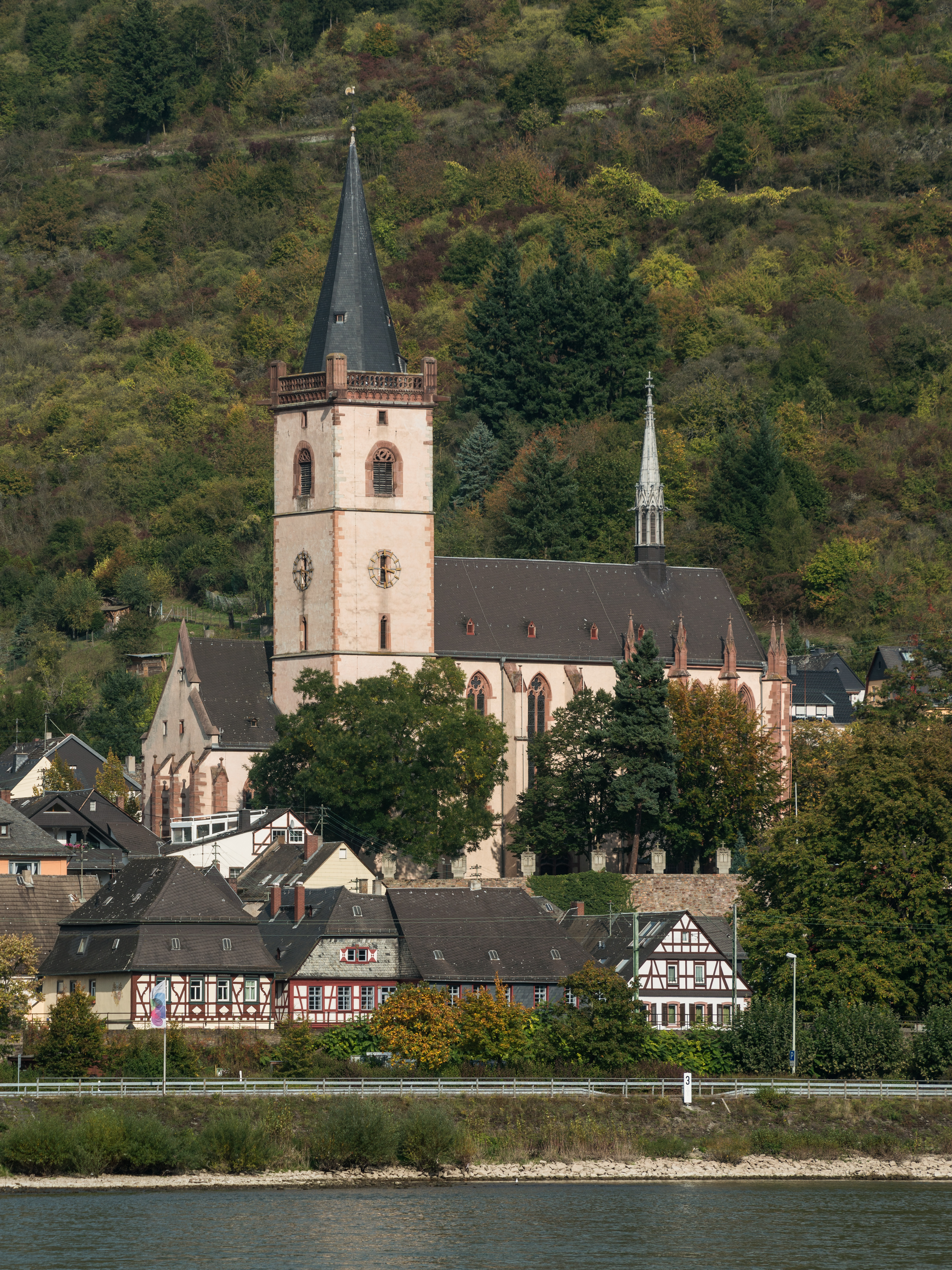
View from other bank of the Rhine

The present Gothic building was begun in the 13th century, replacing an earlier Romanesque basilica. The choir was built first, around 1270, possibly by craftspeople who also worked at the Cologne Cathedral. After an interruption, the main nave was built from around 1304. A second nave was begun in 1398. The steeple was erected on the foundation of a watch tower from Roman times. The front to the West was remodelled by an entrance hall around 1480. A fire destroyed the roof of the church and the steeple in 1554, repairs were done by 1576 and 1578 respectively.

The parish was part of the Diocese of Mainz until the Diocese of Limburg was founded.

In 2002, it became part of the Rhine Gorge UNESCO World Heritage Site.

== Features ==
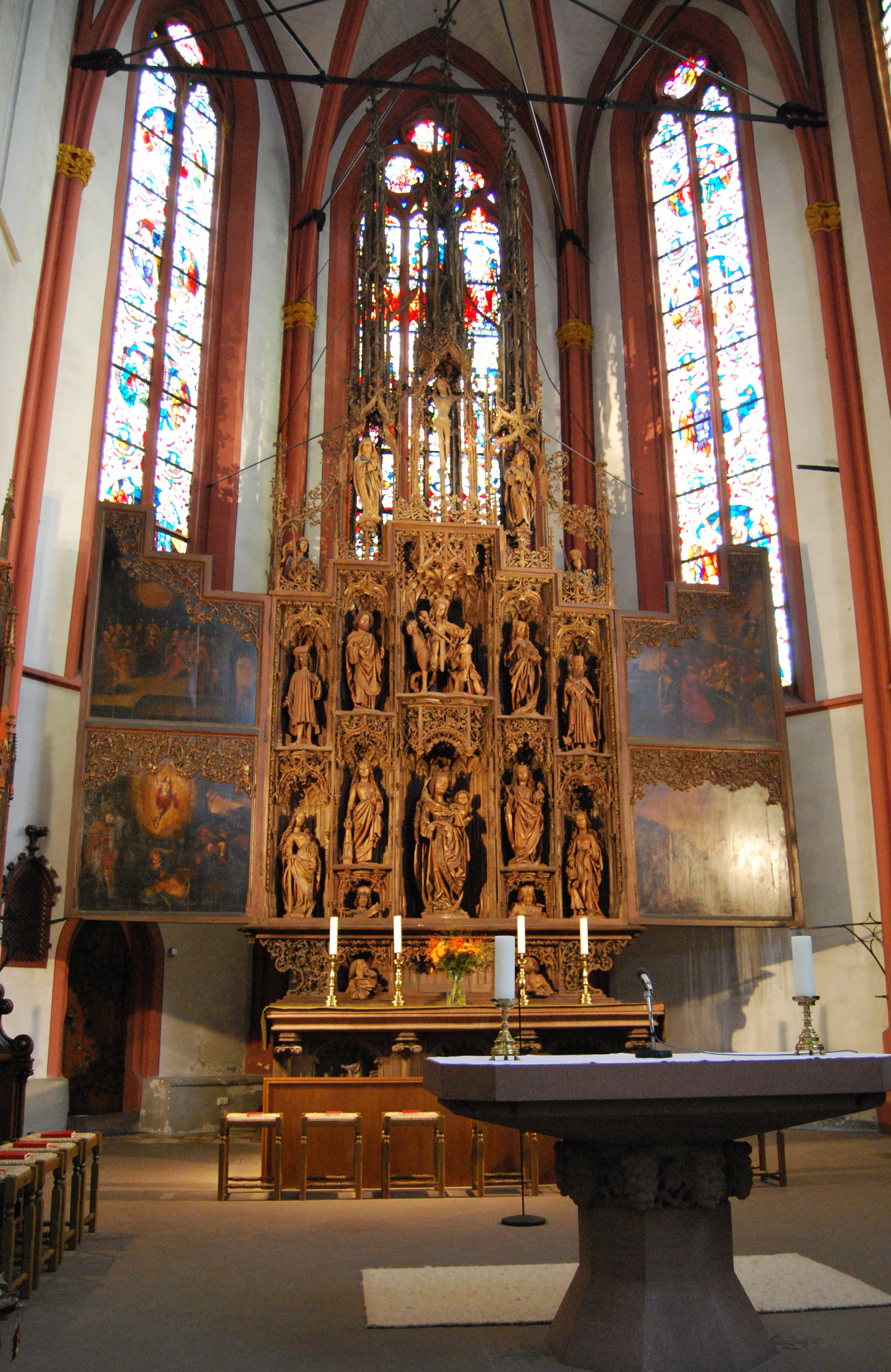
High altar

The church's high altar is from 1483. The monochrome carved wooden altar was attributed to the workshop of Master Hans (Bilger) from Worms, but this is not confirmed, and comparison to other works by him raises doubts. The altar is the highest and first monochrome carved altar in Germany.

The church features choir benches from the end of the 13th century with carvings of figures, a Gothic tabernacle from the 15th century. Many of the church's valuable religious art works were sold in the 19th century by parson Geiger to finance a renovation; remaining pieces include a Pietà from ca. 1400 and a baptismal font from 1464. Two altars in the aisles are from the shop of Hans Steinlein.

=== Organ ===
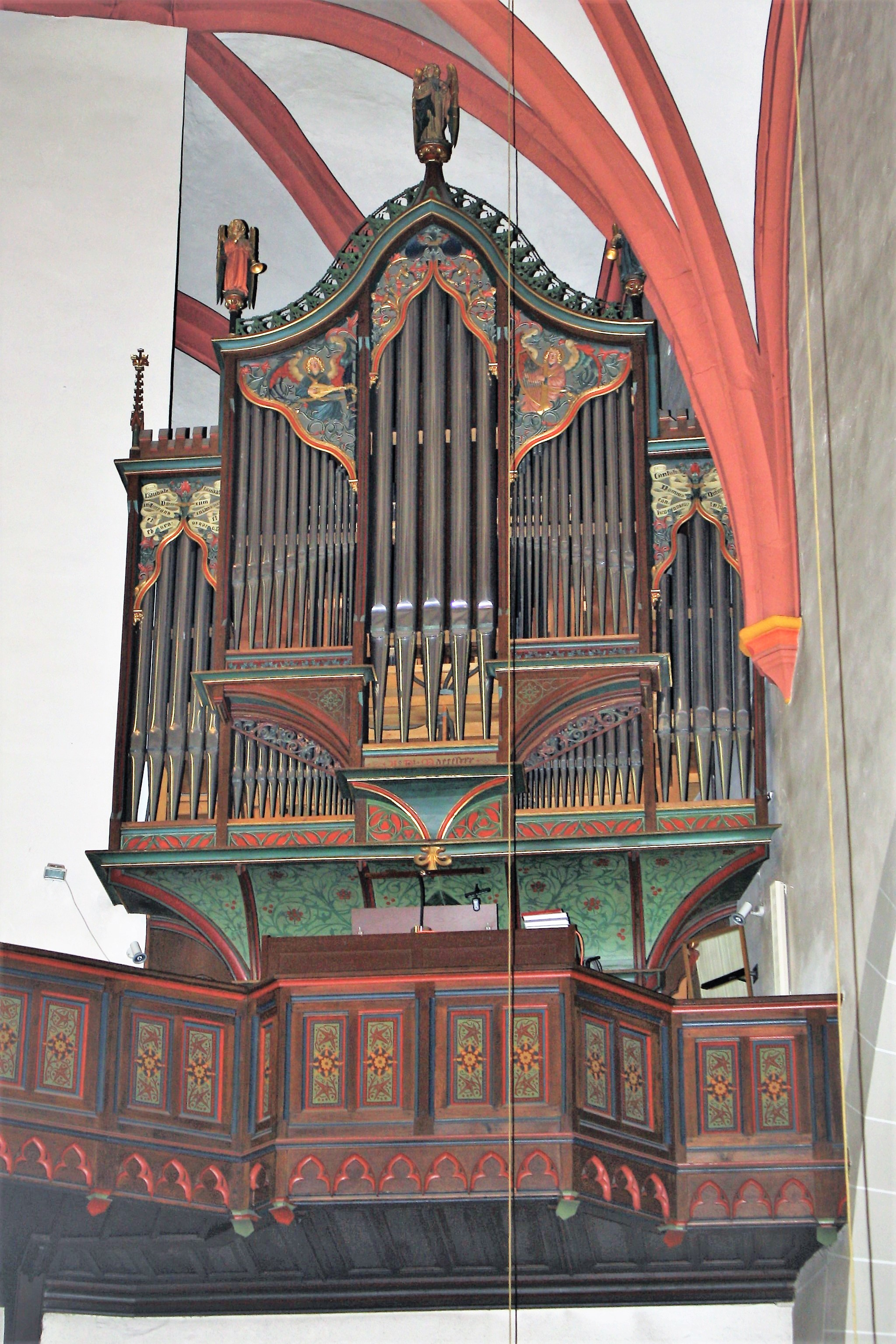
The organ

The present organ was completed in 1984, built by Fischer & Krämer. The organ has 43 stops, three manuals and pedal. Many features of the former 1880 instrument by Ratzmann were used in the new organ. The church has been the venue of the annual organ concert of the Rheingau Musik Festival from its beginning in 1987, with performers such as Marie-Claire Alain, Kay Johannsen, Edgar Krapp, and Olivier Latry from Notre-Dame de Paris who played on 7 July 2019. Johannes von Erdmann, organist at the church from 1987 to 2001, made recordings on the organ.

== Literature ==
- III: Rheinlande und Westfalen, Baudenkmäler. Reclams Kunstführer (in German). 1975. ISBN 3-15-008401-6.
- Simon, Holger (2003). "Das Hochaltarretabel aus Lorch am Rhein". In Nußbaum, Norbert; Euskirchen, Claudia; Hoppe, Stephan (eds.). Wege zur Renaissance. Beobachtungen zu den Anfängen neuzeitlicher Kunstauffassung im Rheinland und den Nachbargebieten um 1500 (PDF) (in German). Köln. pp. 364–89.
- Robert Struppmann (1981). Maria-Kaufmann-Stiftung (ed.). Chronik der Stadt Lorch im Rheingau (in German). Lorch: Maria-Kaufmann-Stiftung.
- Franz Carl Altenkirch (1926). Stadtverwaltung Lorch (ed.). Lorch im Rheingau. Die Geschichte der Stadt vom Ursprung bis zur Gegenwart (in German). Lorch: Stadtverwaltung Lorch.
- Sruppmann, Robert; Rößler, Marianne (1989). Lorch und seine Kunst (in German). Lorch: Maria-Kaufmann-Stiftung Lorch Rheingau/Georg Aug. Walter's Druckerei GmbH, Eltville Rheingau.
- Luthmer, Ferdinand (1907). Die Bauwerke von Lorch. Die Bau- und Kunstdenkmäler des Regierungsbezirks Wiesbaden (in German). Vol. I: Der Rheingau. Frankfurt am Main: Kommissionsverlag von Heinrich Keller. pp. 97–114.
