= Wadern =

- Town
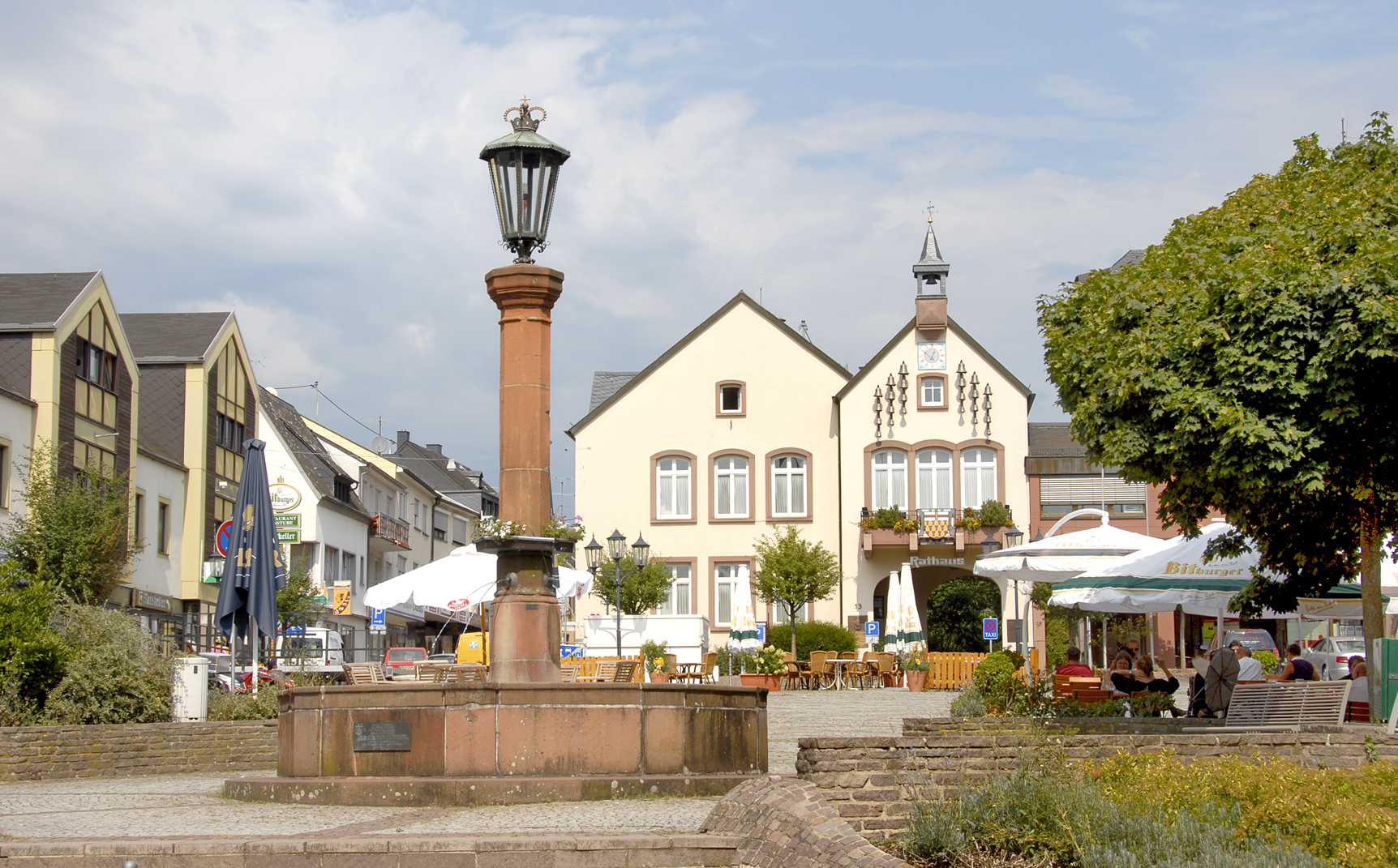

- Coat of arms

- Location of Wadern within Merzig-Wadern district
- Interactive map of Wadern
- Location within Germany Location within Saarland
- Coordinates: 49°31′N 6°52′E
- Country: Germany
- State: Saarland
- District: Merzig-Wadern
- Subdivisions: 13

Government
  - Mayor (2014–24): Jochen Kuttler (ProHochwald)

Area
  - Total: 111.14 km^{2} (42.91 sq mi)
- Elevation: 250–600 m (820–1,970 ft)

Population (2025-12-31)
  - Total: 16,415
  - Density: 147.70/km^{2} (382.53/sq mi)
- Time zone: UTC+01:00 (CET)
  - Summer (DST): UTC+02:00 (CEST)
- Postal codes: 66680–66687
- Dialling codes: 06871, 06874 (Büschfeld + Nunkirchen)
- Vehicle registration: MZG
- Website: www.wadern.de

Wadern (German pronunciation: [ˈvaːdɐn]) is a municipality in the federal state Saarland, which is situated in the southwest of Germany. It is part of the district Merzig-Wadern. Wadern consists of 13 urban districts with approximately 16.000 inhabitants. With 143 inhabitants per km^{2} it is sparsely populated, but, with an area of 111 km^{2}, Wadern is the third largest municipality in Saarland after Saarbrücken and St. Wendel. The town is divided into 14 urban districts and altogether 24 villages belong to the commune. The town is part of the Moselle Franconian language area.

== Geography ==
Wadern is located at the foot of the Schwarzwälder Hochwald.

== History ==
Stone tools and different grave-mounds in the so-called "Hochwald" region are evidence for the city's existence in a time when there were no written sources ever found (prehistory). In connection with the conquest by the Romans (58-51/50 B.C.) first written reports were discovered. Gaius Julius Caesar, the Roman general, created a detailed and written description of the people who were living in this area of Germany at this time with a comment about their rites and customs.

This part of Germany's economy and culture benefitted from the improvements of the traffic infrastructure, which was constructed by the Romans; because of this extension and progress the Celtic population increased.

The first decades after Christ were struck by increased collapsing Germanic tribes, what eventually lead to the dissolution of the Roman Empire as well as to this region being integrated into France.

Agricultural and housing development in the Hochwald were able to extend since there was unused land available to spread out on. In the Middle Ages a lot of clearance was done, which resulted in the most common name endings: -bach, -feld and -rod of the towns around this area. What is now the city of Wadern used to belong to various territories, for example to the Erzstift Trier, Dukedom Lothringen or to the governance of Dagstuhl with its 13th century castle. Especially the governance of Dagstuhl took the main role in the development of downtown Wadern. In 1680, this south-western part of Germany was governed by the counts of Oettingen - Baldern, count Joseph Anton of Oettingen - Baldern and Soetern took over the governance of Dagstuhl in the 18th century.

He moved his residence and his royal household completely to Dagstuhl and resided in his castle built in 1760. With his engagement and expertise he succeeded in improving the economic situation in Dagstuhl. The conferment issued in 1765 of the market right contributed as the most important renewal for Wadern. The then created marketplace and the established market fountain are even today visible signs of this market right.

With indenting French revolutionary troops the feudalism was dissolved and the possession went over to French state possession, thus also castle Dagstuhl which baron Wilhelm Albert de Lasalle took over from Luisenthal in 1807. Castle Münchweiler was bought back in 1801 by his former owner again.

The current city became a French state area in 1801, then got within the scape of the territorial reorganisation by the Wiener congress in 1815 under Prussian management.

By the production of the new outlets for the Saarland coal the number of the people from the Hochwald who were occupied in the mining, grew since the middle of the 19th century. Agriculture was often pursued as a supplementary income. In addition, the connection of the current city with the railroad network led to an economic impetus which also affected the small crafts enterprises positively.

== Urban districts ==
Bardenbach, Büschfeld, Dagstuhl, Krettnich, Lockweiler, Löstertal, Morscholz, Noswendel, Nunkirchen, Steinberg, Wadern, Wadrilltal, Wedern.

=== Villages ===
Altland, Bardenbach, Büschfeld, Buweiler, Dagstuhl, Gehweiler, Kostenbach, Krettnich, Lockweiler, Morscholz, Münchweiler, Niederlöstern, Noswendel, Nuhweiler, Nunkirchen, Oberlöstern, Rathen, Reidelbach, Steinberg, Überlosheim, Vogelsbüsch, Wadern, Wadrill, Wedern

The largest village within the municipality of Wadern is Nunkirchen, which is situated in the very south of the municipality.

== Politics ==
=== Mayors ===
- 1974-1984: Hebert Klein, CDU
- 1984-1998: Berthold Müller, CDU
- 1998-2014: Fredi Dewald, SPD
- since 2014: Jochen Kuttler, ProHochwald

=== Town twinnings ===
Official town twinnings exists between Wadern and Montmorillon and Jeumont in France, Sobotka in Czech Republic, Toma in Burkina Faso and Wahrenbrück in Brandenburg.

== Constructions ==
=== Burgruine Dagstuhl ===
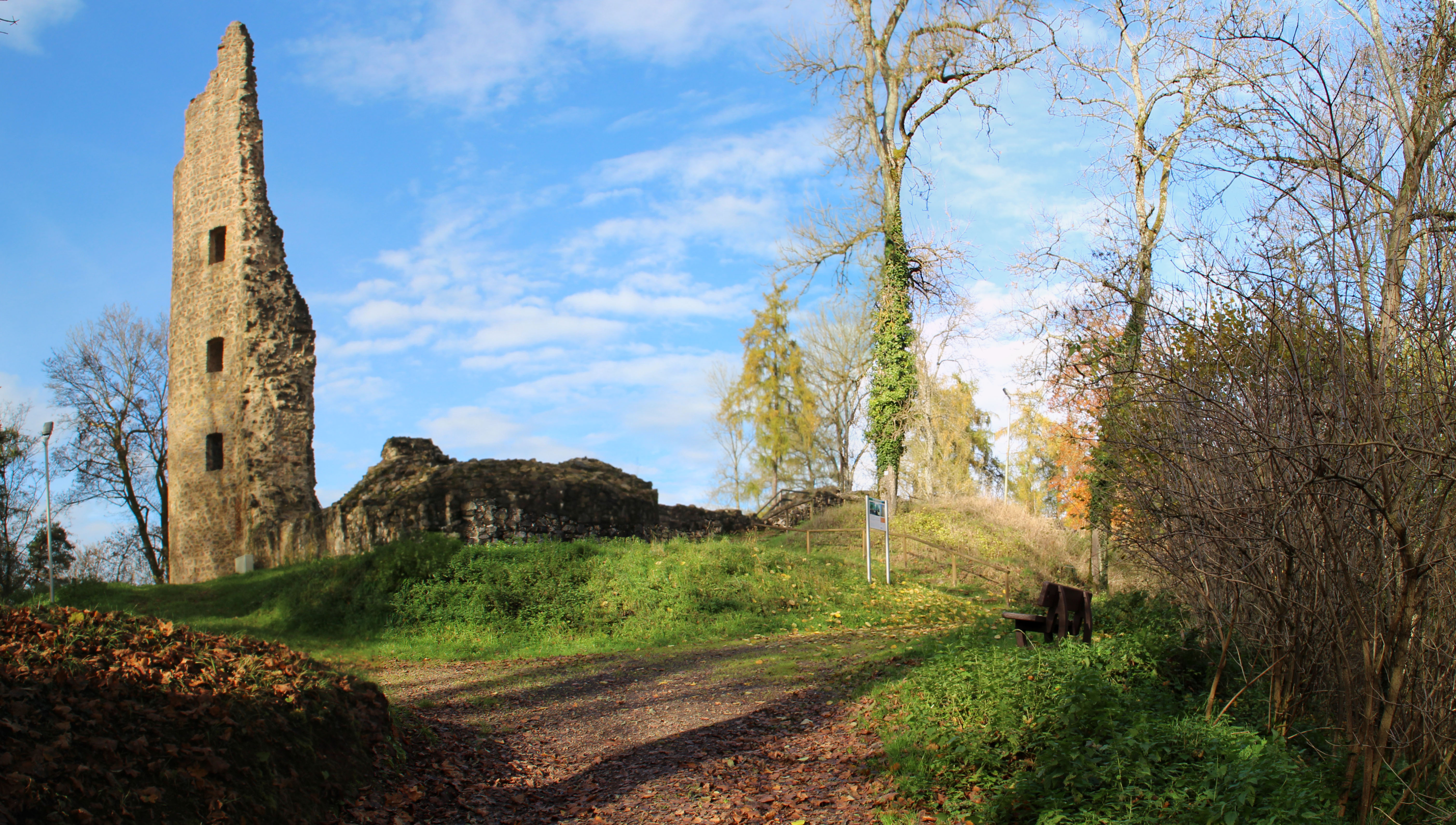
Burgruine Dagstuhl

According to the present documents the castle was built before 1290 by Knight Boemund von Saarbrücken as an outpost of the rule of the bishop of Trier. The plant is a motte and shows with its bailey castle and its bastions a length over 300 meters. After the extinction of the lords of the castle in the 14. century the power disintegrated into the heirs of Fleckenstein, Brucken, Rollingen and Kriechingen, who managed the castle alternately. The plant became subsequently took down by Wolfgang Anton von Langenmantel the administrator of Dompropst and later by archbishop and elector of Trier, Franz Goerg von Schönborn. Since the mid-80s the remains of the castle were exposed and saved. Because of redevelopment measures between 2002 and 2006 a historical path is achievable by two bridges. The didactic processing of information boards and presentations on the internet finished the work.

=== Palace and chapel of Dagstuhl ===
The palace of Dagstuhl was the former domicile of count Joseph Anton von Oettingen-Sötern. He let this palace built between 1760 and 1762 and in 1775 it was widened. While the French revolution the count escaped and so in 1806 the family of Lasalle von Louisenthal took the building. To get a spatial link between the living space and the chapel new extension were built in 1906. Ceiling and walls were painted by Octavie de Lasalle. She laid them out with biblical historical paintings. In the extension of the chapel there is a painted way of cross by her, which originally comes from the church of Lockweiler. Until 1957 the palace was property of the family. After that, it was an old people's home for many years. Today the renowned Leibniz-Zentrum for computer science works in it.

A castle garden, which was put on within the scope of the project Gärten ohne Grenzen belongs to the palace. Many creation signs of the garden decrease to suggestions of the "painter's countess" Octavie de Lasalle, who had documented her images in different garden paintings.

=== Münchweiler's Castle ===
With baron Franz Georg Zandt von Merl's concept and the plans of an unknown architect from the circle of builder Christian Kretschmar, the castle was built between 1749 and 1785 in Münchweiler. A drive lines with chestnuts leads to a big portal and a castle courtyard, which is framed by the residential building and the working quarters. The wings were expanded in the 19th century. The castle has also a Baroque garden. This shape is unique in Saarland and today it is used as a hotel and a café.

=== Castle of Counts Wadern ===
In 1758 count Joseph Anton von Oettingen-Sötern built the first of his three castles, Castle of Counts, in the Oberstraße in Wadern. A former building at this place was mainly used for the count's administration. It was used as magistrate's court head office from 1827 to 1959 with interruptions. The building was used by the Hochwald Gymnasium from 1959 to 1961 until their new building was ready. Today the last part is used as a part of the town hall. It is a plain building from the late Baroque era, divided by five axes with a steep hipped roof and five dormers. The original stairwell with a wooden railing and a pattern like a chain is still inside of today's town hall.

=== Oettinger Schlösschen Wadern ===
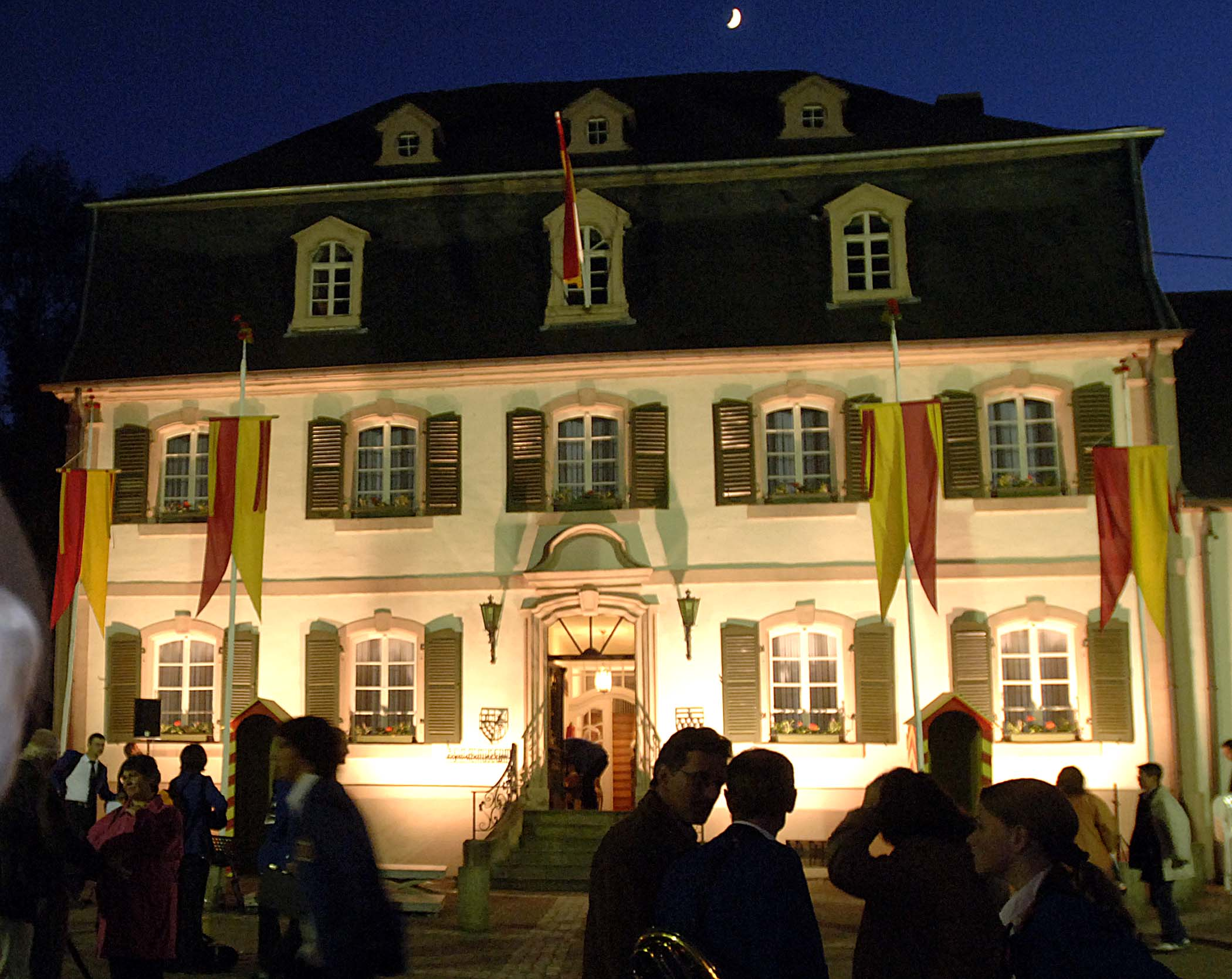
Oettinger Schlösschen Wadern

In 1759 count Joseph Anton built the Oettinger Schlösschen with a park as his first residence in Wadern. After the period of the counts, first the castle was used as a restaurant, after that as a pharmacy. At the exterior wall, visitors can find the Waderner Elle, a special measure which drapers and leather-merchants had to use at the markets. Just before the planned demolition, local geographers and historians saved it. Today, it accommodates the town museum and the council hall.

=== Marketplace fountain Wadern ===
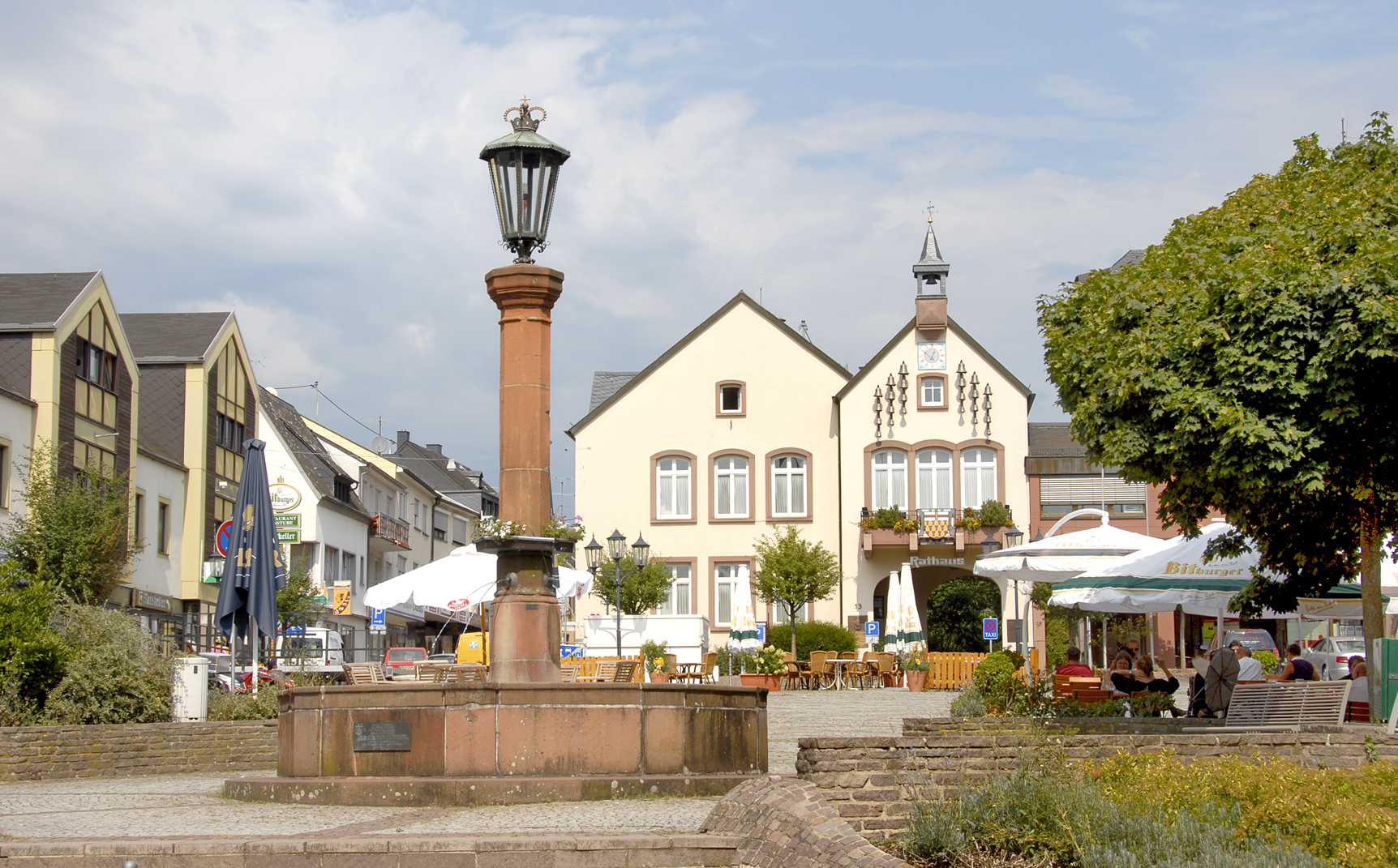
Marketplace fountain Wadern

The Marketplace Fountain is the visible sign that count Joseph Anton von Oettingen-Sötern awarded the craft- and business centre of Wadern to have the right to hold a market on 13. April 1765. The fountain itself was built in 1770 but it had to change its place a few times. After the redesigning of the marketplace it is near his original place again.

== Events ==
=== Regular events ===
The most important events in the Town of Wadern in chronological order:

The first Sunday during the act of fasting: Lauf des Erbsenrades in Wadrill:

according to an old custom the winter ends with a burning spinwheel.

On Palm Sunday: Kunstroute Wadern: More than 30 artists present their work during the open-for-business Sunday in the different stores downtown. This event combines a art exhibition

Second weekend in June: Stadtfest Waderner Maad (dialected for "market"): embedded in historical occasions around the effects of the Earl Joseph Anton von Öttinger-Soetern in village fair is the biggest folk festival in the whole Hochwald area.

On numerous weekends from June till August is the Waderner Marktsommer, which features multifaceted music program at the market square of Wadern. It is free and in the open.

The first weekend in August is dedicated to the festivity Sagenhaftes Spektakulum auf Burg Dagstuhl.

On the Burgruine (which means "castle ruin"), there is Dagstuhl concerts, camping activities, medieval crafting and a kinght-themed competition for children.

In September there is the Waderner Buchwoche, with nights especially for reading (the so-called "Lesenächte"), culinary crime evenings, writing competitions (every two years) and the great book flea-market.

In the fall there are events like Hochwälder Kartoffeltage (Kartoffel = "potato") and the Hochwälder Wildwoche that form culinary activities.

Every year the club Konzerte in der Kleinen Residenz offers a concert program which ranges from classical to jazz music.

Another association, Kultur am Tor, focuses on music, cabaret and readings throughout the year.

== Economy and infrastructure ==
The city Wadern as centre is not only an administrative, social and cultural centre in the north of Saarland, but is also an economic centre of Hochwald region. The city Wadern lays in intersection between the region Saar-Lor-Lux and the region of Hochwald in the north of Saarland.

=== Markets ===
Every last Wednesday of the month the big Krammarkt takes place in the district of Wadern. Furthermore, convenient goods are offered on the fresh market at the market square every Friday morning. The annually city festival Waderner Maad, which is celebrated at the beginning of June, reminds of this market tradition as well. The meaning of markets and in connection to that the formation of the market square in the district Wadern is closely associated with the count Joseph Anton from Oettingen-Stern and his influence on the community.

After transferring from Nördlinger Ries to Schwarzwälder Hochwald he put a special value on the economic development of his administrative residence Wadern. On the 13th of April 1765 the count gave the city the right to hold markets and up until now they take place at the market square, which was only built for this occasion. Especially the livestock markets (cattle and pigs) were also known out of Wadern's boundaries. In particular during the second half of the 19th century they were one of the biggest markets in the Prussian administrative district of Trier. A symbol for the right to hold markets is the market fountain, which was built in 1770.

=== Walking and bike riding ===
The city Wadern offers a wealth of opportunities to get to know its charm. In particular the hiking trails Wadrilltafel, Almglück, Weg des Wassers, Himmels Gääs Paad and Saar-Hunsrück-Steig offer extraordinary experiences in nature. Biking tourism plays an important role in the town Wadern. Both the Saarland-Radweg and the Saar-Bostalsee-Radweg cross the town area. In addition to these national biking tours, there are regional tracks in the administrative district like the Noswendler- See- Runde, Drei-Seen-Runde and Hochwälder Runde.

=== Leisure centre Noswendler lake ===
The leisure centre Noswendler lake contains 20ha and the lake itself has a size of 6.6ha. Due to the great commitment of the local clubs, which are organized in the home and traffic club, the hospitality and extensive event programs during the summer are guaranteed. One can for example explore the lake with a paddle boat. Two playgrounds including a basketball court and a beach volleyball field at the shore invite to play. During a walk one can take a look at the nature reserve Noswendler Bruch, which is the biggest wet biotope in the Saarland. The hiking trails, which are well marked, give visitors many possibilities to explore nature. Three trails with 2.5 km, 6 km or 8 km length invite to walk or hike around the lake with stops included. The Naturpfad, for example, leads right into the Noswendler Bruch. At the lake there is cold- water treatment, and five camper parking spaces. Outstanding events during the year include the Lampionfest, Herbst- Schlachtfest, Deko- Volkslauf and Saktrorennen.

=== Companies ===
Representative for the companies, which are located in the city of Wadern, only the foreign enterprises with the most employments are listed in this enumeration.

==== Saar-Gummi ====
The Saar-Gummi-Gruppe is a deliverer of sealing systems for the car industry. The biggest place regarding the production and developing is the village Büschfeld, which is part of the city Wadern. The company started its history in 1947 at this location. Today the Saar-Gummi-Gruppe is producing their products in 13 locations all over the world, including Europe, North and South America and Asia. The biggest and most important customers of the company are Daimler, BMW, General Motors, Volkswagen, Porsche and Ford.

==== ThyssenKrupp System Engineering ====
ThyssenKrupp System Engineering is a part of the ThyssenKrupp AG. They offer comprehensive engineering services in the fields of car bodies and aggregation montage and in the one hand as an individual solution on the other hand as unitized standard. The factory in Lockweiler is one of the 20 all around the world.

==== Haco shoppingmall ====
Haco Einkaufszentrum is a family led business with 260 employees and 11.000 square meters of selling space. The company was established in 1936 by Franz Haas as a grocery store at a market of Wadern. Then it had 38 square meters and only three employees.

==== Unimed Abbrechnungsservice ====
For hospitals and doctors Gmbh : The 1984 established company has its main location in Wadern-Noswendel and creates deductions for hospitals, doctors and medical central points.

Lockweiler Plastic Werke GmbH is a producer of high-quality plastic products. The company makes all current thermoplastics in spray cast process into plastic products for different use, e.g. for storage equipment, product presentation and labour protection.

==== Workshops for workers social services ====
The compound for inclusion and generation of the workers social services (AWO) Saarland runs in Nunkirchen workshops for humans with interferences.

==== Brabant & Lehnert Werkzeug und Vorrichtungsbau GmbH ====
The company engaged itself with the planning, the construction and the fabrication of complex tolls and contrivances for the category groups automotive and renewable energy. Beside fusing and montage- contrivances their specialist in creating measure and investigation- contrivances.

==== Nursing home St.Sebstian ====
In Nunkirchen is a parochial facility for 78 old and persons who are high-maintenance. They live there and have skilled staff for helping them and nursing them.

== Freeway access ==
The town of Wadern does not have a direct freeway access, but there is one at Nonnweiler/Braunshausen to the A1. It is only five minutes from the urban district of Wadern.

== Schools, education, research ==
The city of Wadern is an important educational and academic location in the region. Around 300 students attend the school in the urban area. There are different types of schools represented: three elementary schools, a special school, a Gemeinschaftsschule, a job-education-center and a Gymnasium. Furthermore, there are nine care-facilities and a multitude of offers for adult education. The Leibniz Center for Informatics (German: Leibniz-Zentrum für Informatik (LZI)) was founded in 1989. Until April 2008 it was called: International Conference and Research Center for Computer Science (German: Internationales Begegnungs- und Forschungszentrum für Informatik (IBFI)). The LZI is member of the Leibniz-Gemeinschaft and is mainly financed by national funds. It is located in the Schloss Dagstuhl and modern buildings in the urban district of Dagstuhl.

== People ==
- Hans-Werner Müller (1942-2026), German politician (CDU)
- Martin Berger (born 1972), German musician, musicologist and university professor
- Magnus Jung (born 1971), German politician
- Anke Rehlinger (born 1976), German politician

== See also ==
- Schloss Dagstuhl, just outside Wadern
