= Beckingen =

- Municipality
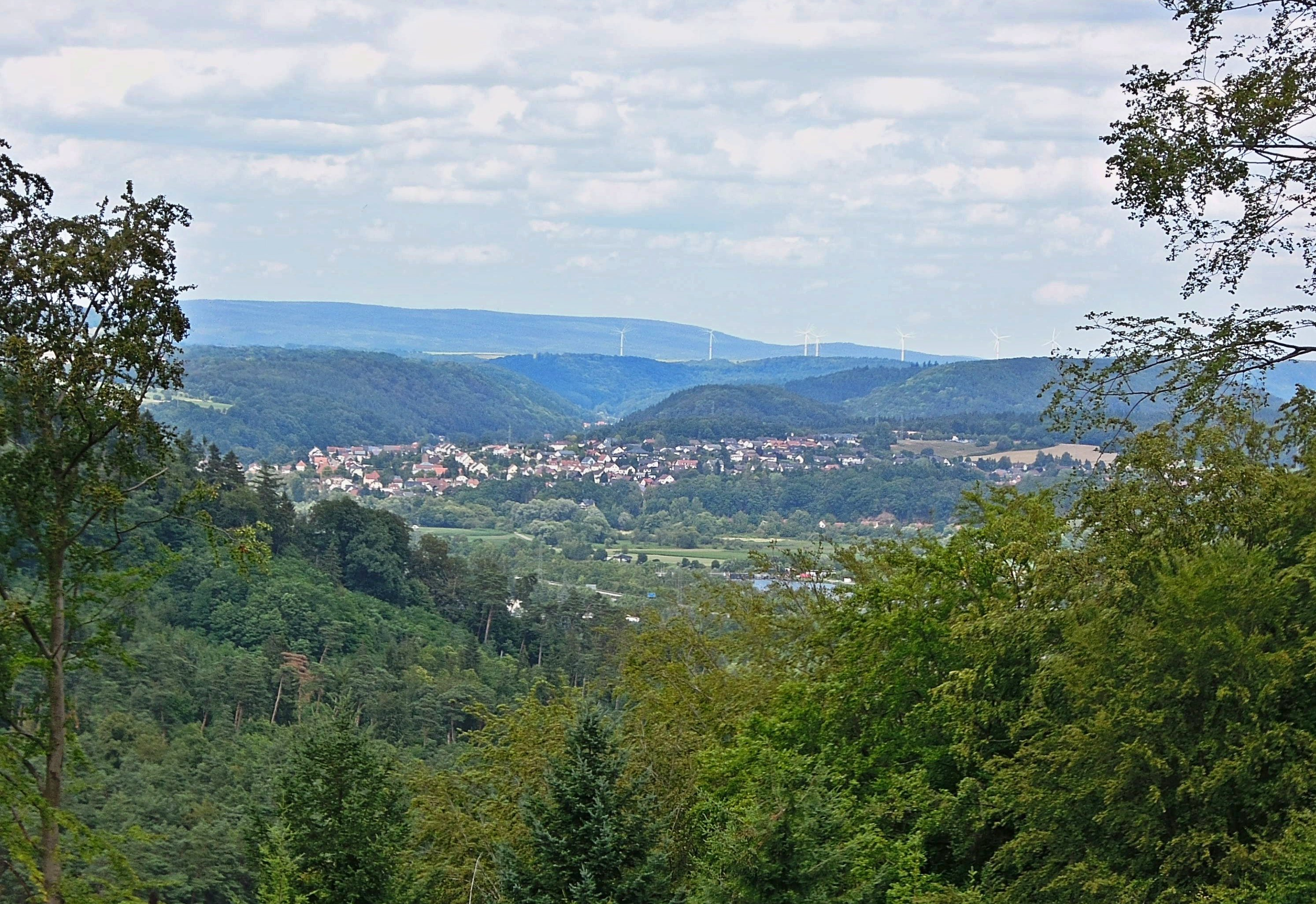
- View from the Oberlimberg

- Coat of arms

- Location of Beckingen within Merzig-Wadern district
- Interactive map of Beckingen
- Location within Germany Location within Saarland
- Coordinates: 49°23′34.21″N 6°42′02.78″E
- Country: Germany
- State: Saarland
- District: Merzig-Wadern
- Subdivisions: 9 parts

Government
  - Mayor (2016–26): Thomas Collmann (SPD)

Area
  - Total: 51.85 km^{2} (20.02 sq mi)
- Elevation: 173–239 m (568–784 ft)

Population (2025-12-31)
  - Total: 15,406
  - Density: 297.1/km^{2} (769.6/sq mi)
- Time zone: UTC+01:00 (CET)
  - Summer (DST): UTC+02:00 (CEST)
- Postal codes: 66701
- Dialling codes: 06832, 06835
- Vehicle registration: MZG
- Website: Official website

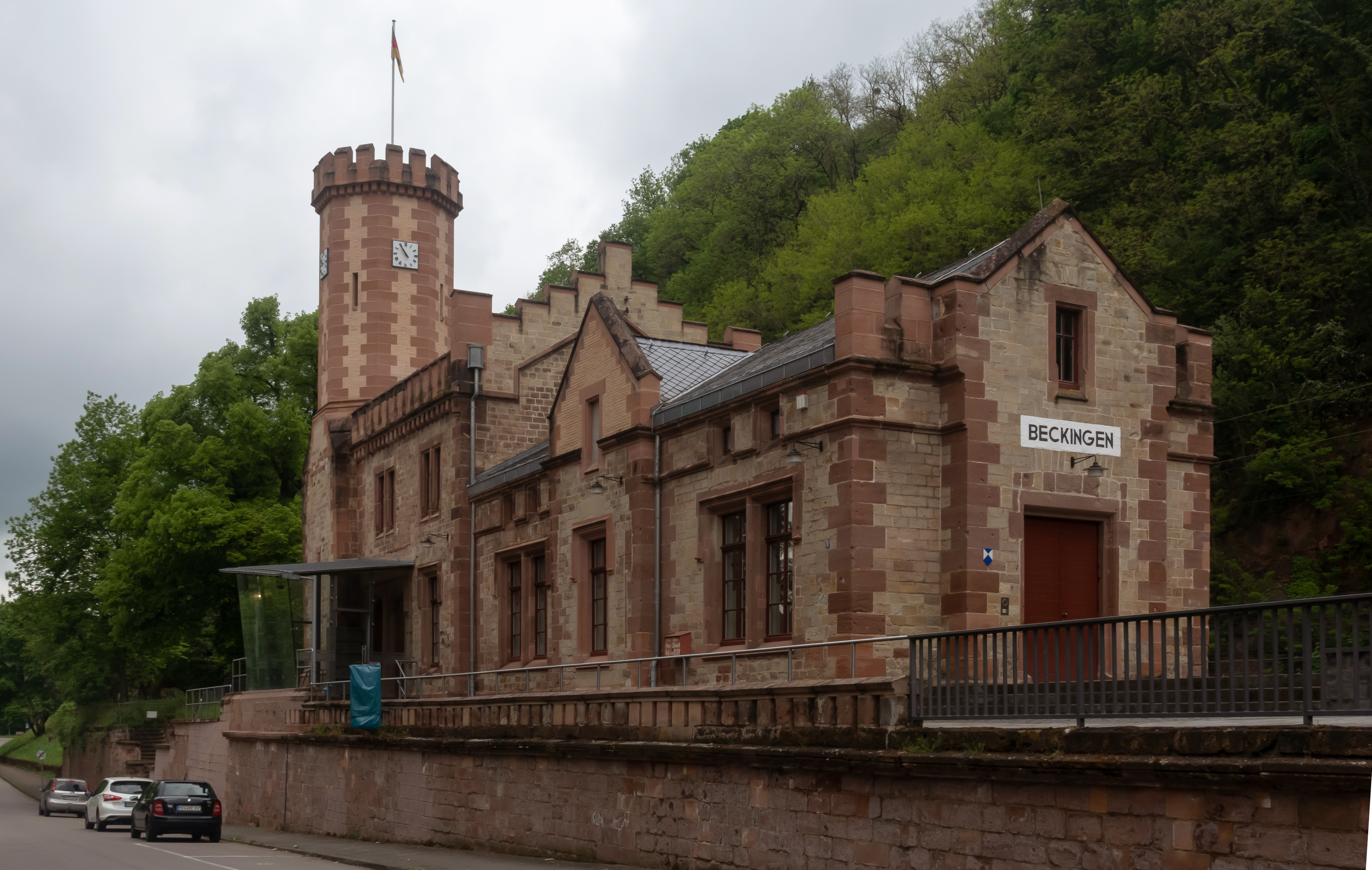
Beckingen, train station

Beckingen (German pronunciation: [ˈbɛkɪŋən]; Saarlandic dialect: Beckinge) is a municipality in the Merzig-Wadern district in Saarland, Germany. It is situated on the river Saar, approximately 7 km southeast of Merzig and 30 km northwest of Saarbrücken. It was created on January 1, 1974 as part of the territorial and administrative reform of the villages Beckingen, Düppenweiler, Erbringen, Hargarten, Haustadt, Honzrath, Oppen, Reimsbach and Saarfels.

== Overview ==
Beckingen is a village outside of Merzig. The old gothic-style railway station from 1858 (Bahnhof Beckingen (Saar)) has been renovated from 2009 to 2014 after suffering severe damages in the Second World War. It is the second oldest surviving railway station in the Saarland and the most architecturally elaborate along the Saar Railway. The village is surrounded by mountainous terrain and a forest can be easily accessed from the centre of the village. There is a local supermarket. There are festivals during the summer. The nearest small town of Dillingen is accessible by bike or foot.

== Geography ==
=== Municipal districts ===
The municipal is divided as follows:

- Beckingen
- Düppenweiler
- Erbringen
- Hargarten
- Haustadt
- Honzrath
- Oppen
- Reimsbach
- Saarfels (former name until May 16, 1923: Fickingen)

=== Neighboring municipals ===
The entire municipality of Beckingen is adjacent to the following municipalities:

Clockwise:

- Bachem (district of the municipality Losheim am See)
- Rimlingen (district of the municipality Losheim am See)
- Rissenthal (district of the municipality Losheim am See)
- Wahlen (district of the municipality Losheim am See)
- Außen (district of the municipality Schmelz (Saar))
- Hüttersdorf (district of the municipality Schmelz (Saar))
- Piesbach (district of the municipality Nalbach)
- Nalbach
- Diefflen (district of the city of Dillingen / Saar)
- Pachten (district of the city of Dillingen / Saar)
- Rehlingen (district of the municipality Rehlingen-Siersburg)
- Fremersdorf (district of the municipality Rehlingen-Siersburg)
- Menningen (district of the city of Merzig)
- Bietzen (district of the city of Merzig)
- Merchingen (district of the city of Merzig)

The municipality of the capital Beckingen borders on the following places:

Clockwise:

- Bietzen (district of the city of Merzig)
- Haustadt
- Düppenweiler
- Nalbach
- Diefflen (district of the city of Dillingen / Saar)
- Pachten (district of the city of Dillingen / Saar)
- Rehlingen (district of the municipality Rehlingen-Siersburg)
- Saarfels
- Menningen (district of the city of Merzig)
