= Merzig =

- Town
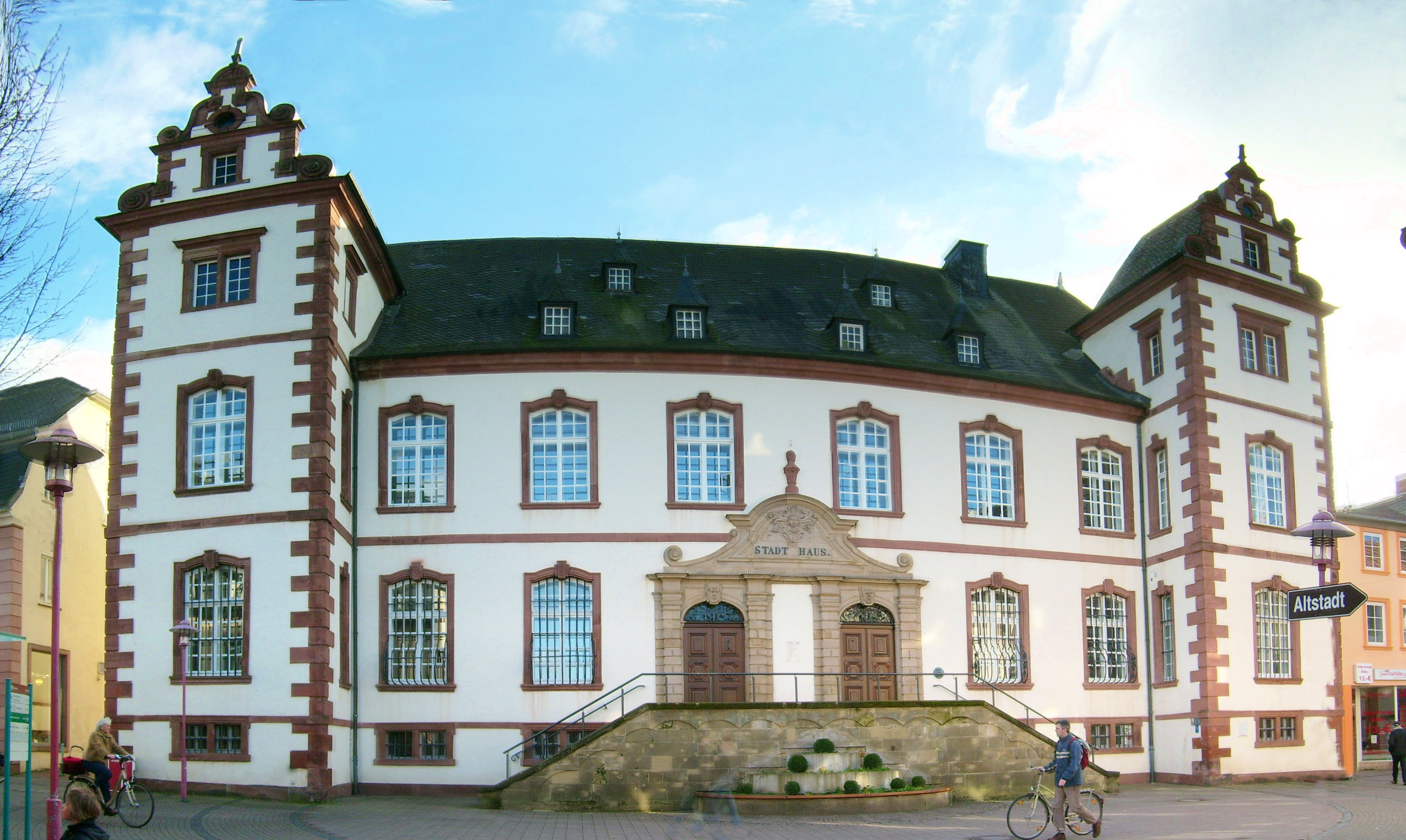
- Town hall in Merzig

- Flag Coat of arms

- Location of Merzig within Merzig-Wadern district
- Interactive map of Merzig
- Location within Germany Location within Saarland
- Coordinates: 49°27′N 6°37′E
- Country: Germany
- State: Saarland
- District: Merzig-Wadern
- Subdivisions: 17

Government
  - Mayor (2019–29): Marcus Hoffeld (CDU)

Area
  - Total: 108.98 km^{2} (42.08 sq mi)
- Elevation: 172 m (564 ft)

Population (2025-12-31)
  - Total: 31,341
  - Density: 287.58/km^{2} (744.84/sq mi)
- Time zone: UTC+01:00 (CET)
  - Summer (DST): UTC+02:00 (CEST)
- Postal codes: 66651–66663
- Dialling codes: 06861, 06869
- Vehicle registration: MZG
- Website: merzig.de

Merzig (German: [ˈmɛʁtsɪç], French: Mercy, Moselle Franconian: Meerzisch/Miërzësch) is a town in Saarland, Germany. It is the capital of the district Merzig-Wadern, with about 30,000 inhabitants in 17 municipalities on 108 km². It is situated on the river Saar, approx. 35 km south of Trier, and 35 km northwest of Saarbrücken.

== History ==
=== Evolution of the name ===
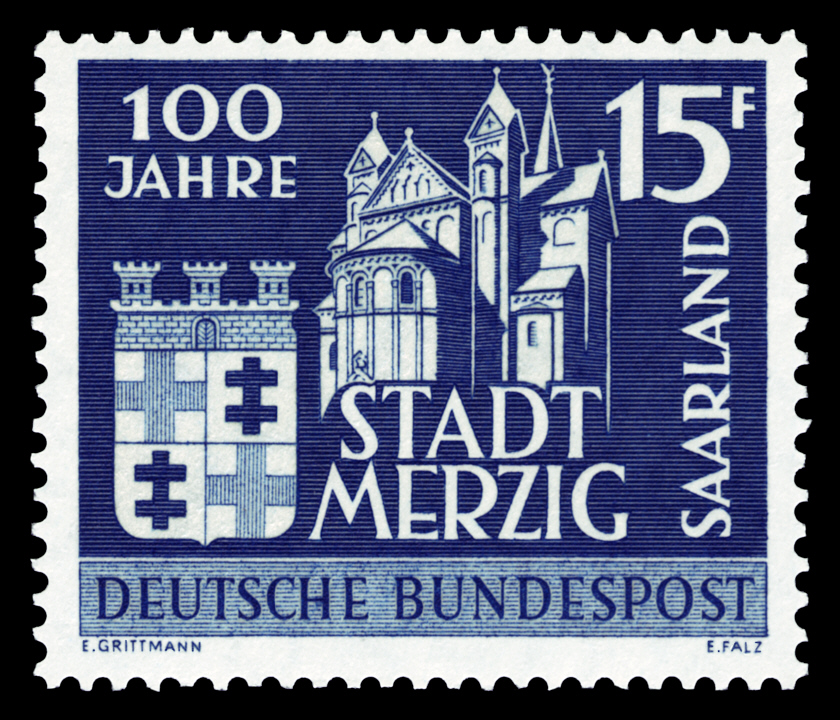
Stamp of the Deutsche Bundespost commemorating the 1957 centennial of Merzig receiving city rights.

369	Martiaticum
870	Martia
1338	Mertzige
1478	Mertzych
1497	Mertzig
1499	Mertzigh, Mertzych

In addition to the above, the city was known under French rule as Mercy.

Historical affiliations

Roman Empire 369–5th century
Franks 5th century
Francia->Carolingian Empire 481–888
Bishopric->Prince-Bishopric->Electorate of Trier 888–1333
Duchy of Lorraine/ Electorate of Trier 1333–1766 (condominium)
Kingdom of France/ Electorate of Trier 1766–1778 (condominium)
Electorate of Trier 1778–1794
French Republic->French Empire 1794–1815
Kingdom of Prussia 1815–1871
German Empire 1871–1918
Territory of the Saar Basin 1920–1935
Nazi Germany 1935–1945
Saar Protectorate 1947–1956
West Germany 1957–1990
Germany 1990–present

== Subdivisions ==
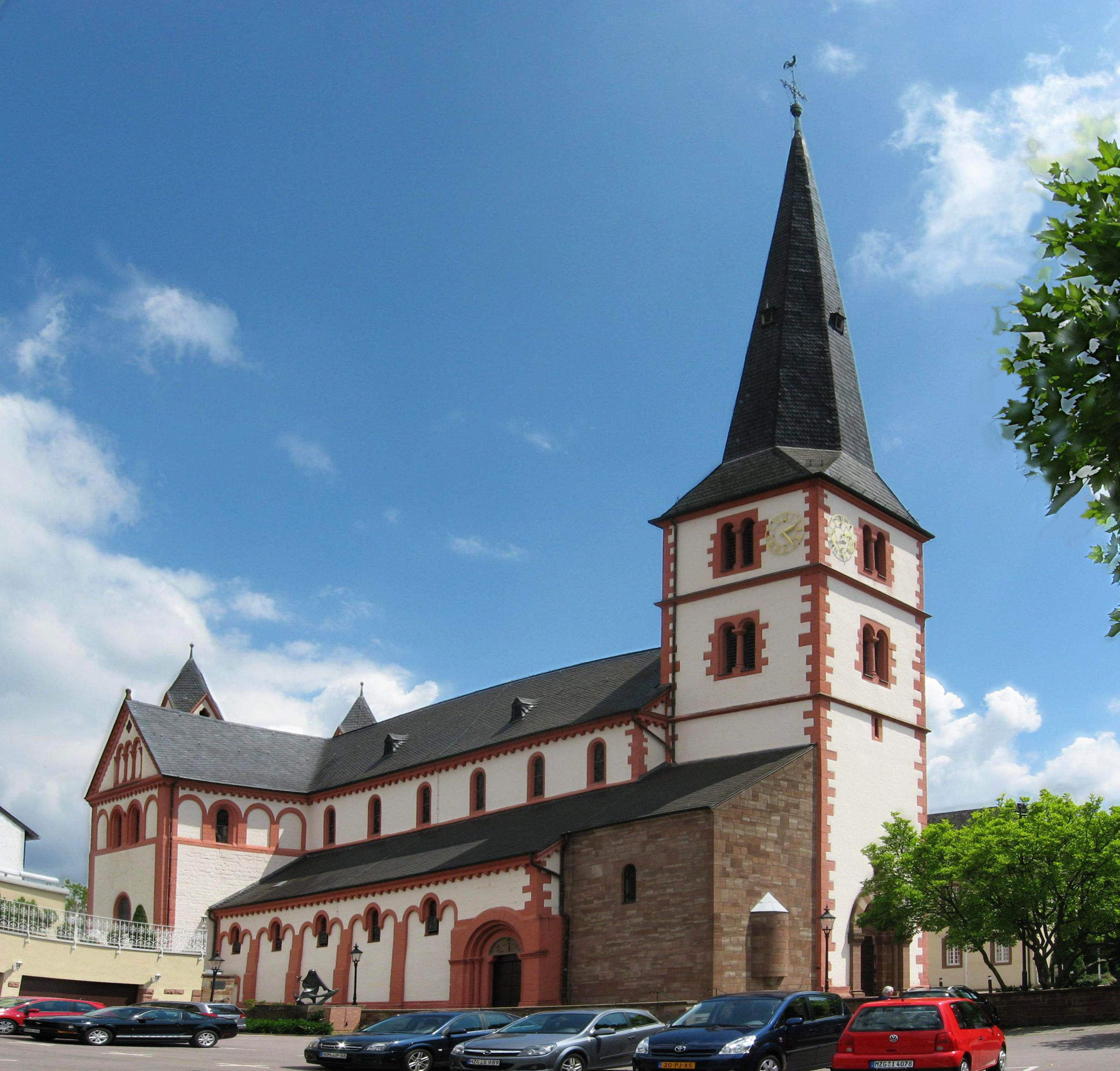
Romanesque St. Peter's Church

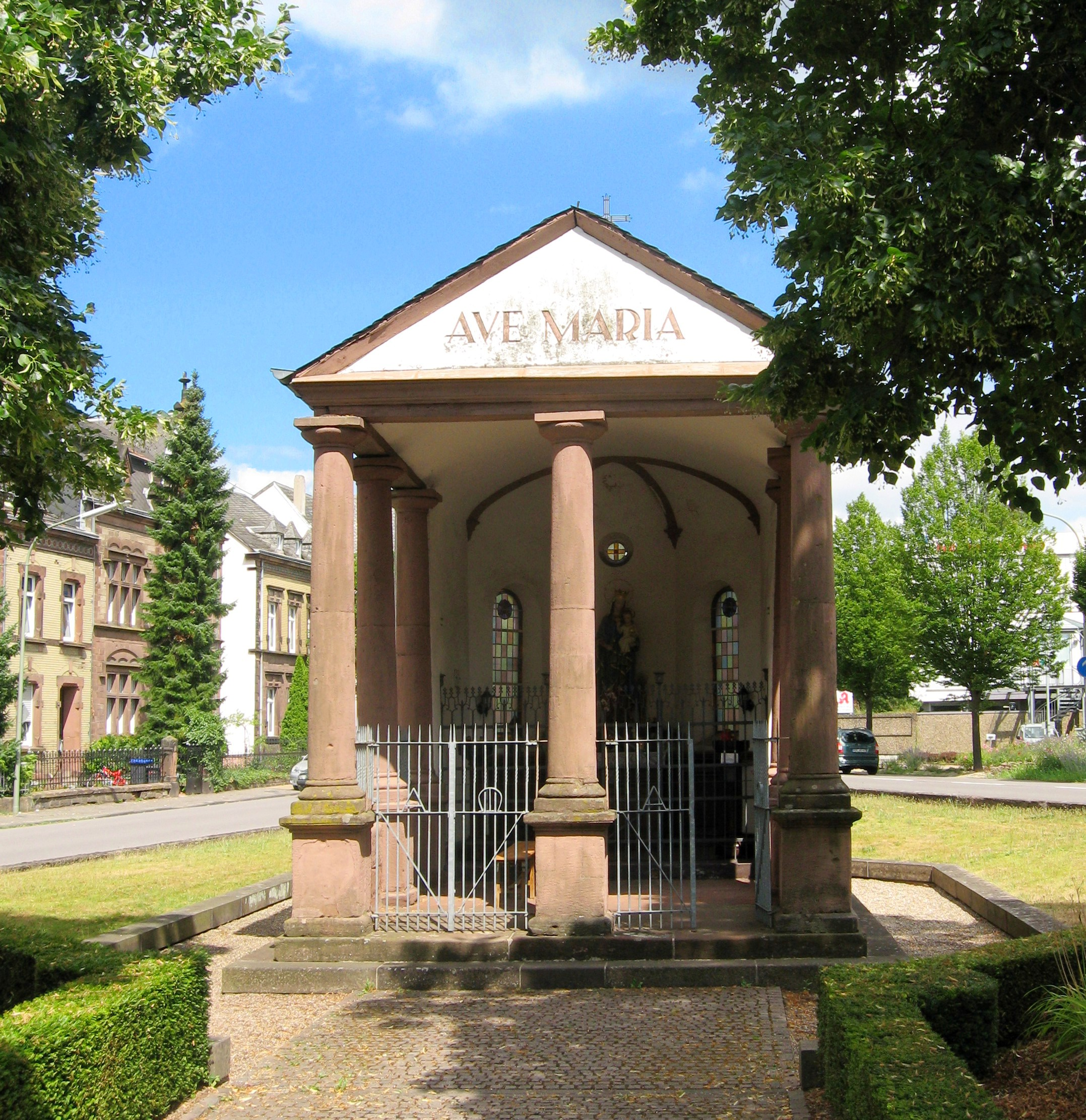
Neoclassical St. Mary's Chapel

Merzig was created in 1974 as part of the territorial reform in Saarland. The present-day town consists of the previous town of Merzig and 16 surrounding former municipalities. The population of the present town, including all outlying districts (as of June 30, 2011):

District	Population
Merzig	10,934
Ballern	1,189
Besseringen	2,979
Bietzen	968
Brotdorf	3,733
Büdingen	310
Fitten	706
Harlingen	565
Hilbringen	2,569
Mechern	834
Menningen	635
Merchingen	939
Mondorf	768
Schwemlingen	2,186
Silwingen	387
Weiler	350
Wellingen	291
Total	30,343

== Culture and sights ==
=== Museums ===
- Expeditionary Museum Werner Freund
- Fine mechanical museum in the Fellenbergmühle
- Museum of Local History in Fellenberg Castle
- B-Werk Besseringen
- Saarland Psychiatric Museum

=== Buildings ===
- Church of St. Peter
- Historic townhouse („Altes Rathaus“)
- Diverse baroque buildings such as Halfenhaus, Staadt-Marx's Bürgerhaus, Hilbringer Schlösschen, Abteihof Besseringen ("Zehnt-Haus"), former residence of Christian Kretzschmar in Trierer Straße (all 18th century)
- Various interesting buildings of the 19th and early 20th centuries such as Villa Fuchs, Protestant church, churches in Hilbringen (St. Peter in chains) and Besseringen (Sacred Heart Church), Lothringer Hof, station, main building of the former state hospital, Art Nouveau buildings in Trierer Straße, former jam factory (previous monastery)
- Various chapels worth seeing, such as St. Mary's Chapel, St. Cross Chapel, Kreuzberg Chapel, Josef Chapel, Harlinger Chapel, Old Wellinger Chapel, St. Clement Chapel (Menningen)
- Seffersbach Bridge, 1901, last preserved suspension belt bridge "System Möller" in Saarland
- Catholic parish church of St. Agatha (Merchingen)
- Catholic parish church of St. Mary Magdalene (Brotdorf)
- Catholic parish church of St. Martin (Bietzen)
- Catholic parish church of St. Josef

=== Parks ===
- Bürgerpark Besseringen
- Garden of the Senses on the Kreuzberg
- Orchids on the Nackberg at Hilbringen
- Town park

=== Other attractions ===
- B-Werk Besseringen (Westwall Bunkeranlage), on the B 51 between Merzig and Besseringen
- Public indoor swimming pool „Das Bad“
- Bietzener healing spring on the B 51 in the direction of Beckingen
- Public natural swimming pool Heilborn
- Sculptor symposium stones at the border
- Monastery St. Gangolf, between Besseringen and Mettlach
- Museum railway (to Losheim)
- Animal enclosure at Blättelbornweiher
- Wolf enclosure in the Kammerforst
- Kreuzbergkapelle with views over almost the entire city and the Merzig basin
- Kletterhafen - Europe's largest free-standing climbing park

=== Sport ===
Merzig is the birthplace of footballer Kevin Trapp and tennis player Benjamin Becker.

=== Musical theatre ===
Since 2012 Merzig stages musicals for two months each year, starring famous German musical actors like Uwe Kröger. The venue is a huge marquee, called 'Zeltpalast' (marquee palace).

- 2012: Hairspray
- 2013: Burlesque
- 2014: The Addams Family, German debut
- 2015: La Cage aux Folles
- 2016: The Addams Family (off season production in February)
- 2016: 9 to 5, German debut

== Twin towns – sister cities ==
Merzig is twinned with:

- Luckau, Germany
- Saint-Médard-en-Jalles, France

== Notable people ==
- Franz-Josef Röder (1909–1979), politician (CDU)
- Susanne Fontaine (born 1961), musicologist
- Kevin Trapp (born 1990), footballer
- Sahra Wagenknecht (born 1969), politician (Bündnis Sahra Wagenknecht)
