= Merzig-Wadern =

Coordinates: 49°30′N 6°45′E

- District
- Flag Coat of arms
- Country: Germany
- State: Saarland
- Capital: Merzig

Government
  - District admin.: Daniela Schlegel-Friedrich (CDU)

Area
  - Total: 555.00 km^{2} (214.29 sq mi)

Population (31 December 2024)
  - Total: 108,779
  - Density: 196.00/km^{2} (507.63/sq mi)
- Time zone: UTC+01:00 (CET)
  - Summer (DST): UTC+02:00 (CEST)
- Vehicle registration: MZG (since 1957); OE 2/ OE 12/ OE 22/ OE 32 (1949–1956); SA 02 (1945–1949)
- Website: www.merzig-wadern.de

Merzig-Wadern is a Kreis (district) in the northwest of the Saarland, Germany. Neighboring districts are Trier-Saarburg, Sankt Wendel, Saarlouis, the French département Moselle, and Luxembourg.

== History ==
The district was created in 1816 when the area became property of Prussia. After World War I the Saar area was under special government of the League of Nations, which split the district into two. The area around Wadern stayed Prussian, while the Merzig area became part of the Saar area. In 1935, the Saar area rejoined Germany; however, it took until after the World War II that the two parts of the district were reunited in 1946.

== Geography ==
The river Saar flows through the district, the Moselle forms the boundary in the west to Luxembourg.

== Coat of arms ==
The coat of arms show the symbols of those countries which had possessions in the district's area. The top-left show the cross of Trier, the top-right those of Lorraine. The wolf hook in the bottom-left represents Dagstuhl, which owned Wadern; the lion in the bottom-right stands for Luxembourg, which owned the western part of the district.

== Towns and municipalities ==
Clickable map of towns and municipalities in the district

Towns
1. Merzig
2. Wadern
Municipalities
1. Beckingen
2. Losheim am See
3. Mettlach
4. Perl
5. Weiskirchen

== Education ==
=== Primary schools ===
- Primary school Dreiländereck Perl
- Primary school Langwies of the municipality Mettlach
- Primary school Orscholz
- Nicolaus-Voltz primary school Losheim
- Primary school Bachem-Britten
- Primary school elections
- Primary school Düppenweiler
- Primary school Beckingen
- Primary school Reimsbach
- Primary school Kreuzberg (Merzig)
- Primary school Merzig-Besseringen
- Primary school Merzig-Brotdorf
- Primary school Merzig-Hilbringen
- Primary School Saargau (Schwemlingen)
- Primary School St. Josef (Merzig)
- Primary school St. Martin Wadrill-Steinberg with the locations Wadrill and Steinberg
- Primary school Nunkirchen with the locations Nunkirchen and Bardenbach
- Primary school Lockweiler
- Primary school Konfeld

Grammar schools

- German-Luxembourgish Schengen Lyceum Perl
- Gymnasium am Stefansberg (GaS)
- Oberstufen-Gymnasium of the BBZ 'Merzig subdivided into the faculties health and social affairs as well as economics
- Peter Wust Gymnasium (PWG)
- Hochwald-Gymnasium Wadern

=== Community schools ===
- Community school Orscholz
- Peter Dewes Community School Losheim am See
- Friedrich Bernhard Karcher School Beckingen
- Christian Kretzschmar School Merzig
- Count Anton School Wadern
- Eichenlaubschule Weiskirchen

=== Special schools ===
- Special Education Learning Losheim
- School zum Broch, special school mental development Merzig-Merchingen
- Special school for learning disabled people Merzig-Brotdorf
- Special School Learning Wadern

=== Occupational schools ===
- BBZ Merzig
- BBZ-Hochwald
