= Saarland =

State in Germany

Saarland Sarre (French)
- State
- Flag Coat of arms Brandmark
- Anthem: "Ich rühm' dich, du freundliches Land an der Saar" ("I praise you, you friendly land at the Saar")
- Coordinates: 49°23′N 6°50′E
- Country: Germany
- Capital (and largest city): Saarbrücken

Government
  - Body: Landtag of Saarland
  - Minister-President: Anke Rehlinger (SPD)
  - Governing party: SPD
  - Bundesrat votes: 3 (of 69)
  - Bundestag seats: 8 (of 630) (as of 2025)

Area
  - Total: 2,571.52 km^{2} (992.87 sq mi)

Population (2024)
  - Total: 1,012,141
  - Density: 393.596/km^{2} (1,019.41/sq mi)
- Demonym: Saarländer

GDP
  - Total: €43.174 billion (2025)
  - Per capita: €42,656 (2025)
- Time zone: UTC+1 (CET)
  - Summer (DST): UTC+2 (CEST)
- ISO 3166 code: DE-SL
- NUTS Region: DEC
- HDI (2022): 0.934 very high · 11th of 16
- Website: www.saarland.de

Saarland (German: [ˈzaːɐ̯lant]) is a landlocked federal state of Germany in the southwest of the country. With an area of 2,570 km^{2} (990 sq mi) and a population of 1 million in 2024, it is the smallest German state in area apart from the city-states of Berlin, Bremen, and Hamburg, and the smallest in population apart from Bremen. Saarbrücken is the state capital and largest city; other cities include Neunkirchen and Saarlouis. Saarland is mainly surrounded by the department of Moselle (Grand Est) in France to the west and south and the neighboring state of Rhineland-Palatinate in Germany to the north and east; it also shares a short border, about 8 kilometres (5 miles) long, with the canton of Remich in Luxembourg to the northwest.

Having long been a relatively small part of the long-contested territories along the Franco-German linguistic border, Saarland first gained specific economic and strategic importance in the 19th century due to the wealth of its coal deposits and the heavy industrialization that grew as a result. Saarland was first established as a distinct political entity in 1920 after World War I as the Territory of the Saar Basin, which was occupied and governed by France under a League of Nations mandate.

Saarland was returned to Nazi Germany following the 1935 Saar status referendum. After World War II, the territory was occupied by France. It then became the Saar Protectorate on 17 December 1947. After the 1955 Saar Statute referendum, it joined the Federal Republic of Germany as a state on 1 January 1957. Saarland used its own currency, the Saar franc, and postage stamps issued specially for the territory until 1959.

== History ==
=== Before World War I ===
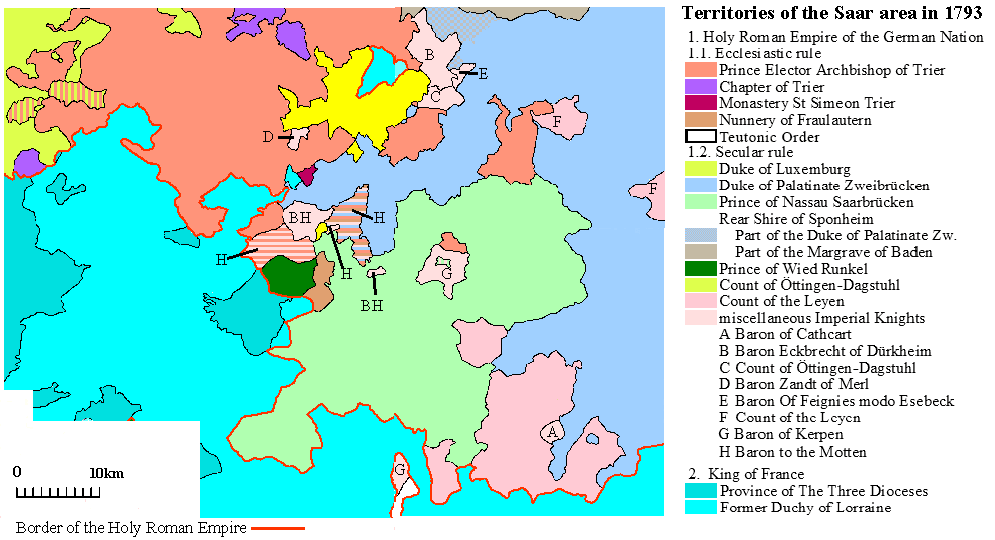
Map of the Saar region in 1793

The region of the Saarland was settled by the Celtic tribes of Treveri and Mediomatrici. The most impressive relic of their time is the remains of a fortress of refuge at Otzenhausen in the north of the Saarland. In the 1st century BC, the Roman Empire made the region part of its province of Belgica, and the Celtic population mixed with the Roman conquerors. The region became wealthy, which can still be seen in the remains of Roman villas and villages.

Roman rule ended in the 5th century, when the Franks conquered the territory. For the next 1,300 years the region shared the history of the Kingdom of the Franks, the Carolingian Empire and the Holy Roman Empire. The region of the Saarland was divided into several small territories, some of which were ruled by sovereigns of adjoining regions. Most important of the local rulers were the counts of Nassau-Saarbrücken. Within the Holy Roman Empire these territories gained a wide range of independence, threatened, however, by the French kings, who sought from the 17th century onwards to incorporate all the territories on the western side of the river Rhine. They invaded the area in 1635, 1676, 1679, and 1734, extending their realm to the river Saar and establishing the city and stronghold of Saarlouis in 1680.

It was not the king of France but the armies of the French Revolution who terminated the independence of the states in the region of the Saarland. After 1792 they conquered the region and made it part of the French Republic. While a strip in the west belonged to the Moselle department, the centre in 1798 became part of the Sarre department, and the east became part of the Mont-Tonnerre department. After the defeat of Napoleon in 1815, the region was divided again. Most of it became part of the Prussian Rhine Province. Another part in the east, corresponding to the present Saarpfalz district, was allocated to the Kingdom of Bavaria. A small part in the northeast was ruled by the Duke of Oldenburg.

On 31 July 1870, the French Emperor Napoleon III ordered an invasion across the River Saar to seize Saarbrücken. The first shots of the Franco-Prussian War of 1870–71 were fired on the heights of Spichern during the Battle of Spicheren, south of Saarbrücken. The Saar region became part of the German Empire which came into existence on 18 January 1871, during the course of the war.

=== Interwar history ===
In 1921, the Saargebiet was occupied by Britain and France under the provisions of the Treaty of Versailles. The occupied area included portions of the Prussian Rhine Province and the Bavarian Rhenish Palatinate. In practice the region was administered by France. In 1920, this was formalized by a 15-year mandate by the League of Nations.

In 1933, a considerable number of communists and other political opponents of Nazism fled to the Saar, as it was the only part of Germany that remained outside national administration following the First World War. As a result, anti-Nazi groups agitated for the Saarland to remain under French administration. However, with most of the population being ethnically German, such views were considered suspect or even treasonous, and therefore found little support.

When the original 15-year term was over, a plebiscite was held in the territory on 13 January 1935 in which 90.8 percent of those voting favoured rejoining Germany.

=== Nazi period ===
Following the referendum Josef Bürckel was appointed on 1 March 1935 as the German Reich's commissioner for reintegration (Reichskommissar für die Rückgliederung des Saarlandes). Once the reincorporation was accomplished, on 17 June 1936 his title was changed to Reichskommissar für das Saarland (Reich Commissioner for the Saarland). In September 1939, in response to the German invasion of Poland, French forces invaded the Saarland in a half-hearted offensive, occupying some villages and meeting little resistance, before withdrawing. After 8 April 1940 Bürckel's title was changed again to Reichskommissar für die Saarpfalz (Reich Commissioner for the Saar Palatinate); finally, after 11 March 1941, Bürckel was made Reichsstatthalter in der Westmark (Reich Governor of the Western Borderland). He died on 28 September 1944 and was succeeded by Willi Stöhr, who remained in office until the region fell to advancing American forces in March 1945.

=== History after World War II ===
After World War II, the Saarland came under French occupation again and became the Saar Protectorate. France did not annex the Saar or expel the local German population, in contrast to the fate of the territories which were merged by Poland and the USSR. In his speech "Restatement of Policy on Germany", made in Stuttgart on 6 September 1946, United States Secretary of State James F. Byrnes stated the U.S. position on detaching the Saar from Germany: "The United States does not feel that it can deny to France, which has been invaded three times by Germany in 70 years*, its claim to the Saar territory".

* In 1870, 1914, and 1940.

The Saar and Ruhr areas were historically a central location for coal mining. This attracted the steel industry, which is essential for the production of munitions. The Treaty of Paris (1951) established the European Coal and Steel Community, which led to the termination of the International Authority for the Ruhr (whose purpose was to regulate Ruhr coal and steel production and distribution). However, the Treaty sidestepped the issue of the Saar protectorate: an attached protocol stated Germany and France agreed the Treaty would have no bearing on their views of the status of the Saar.

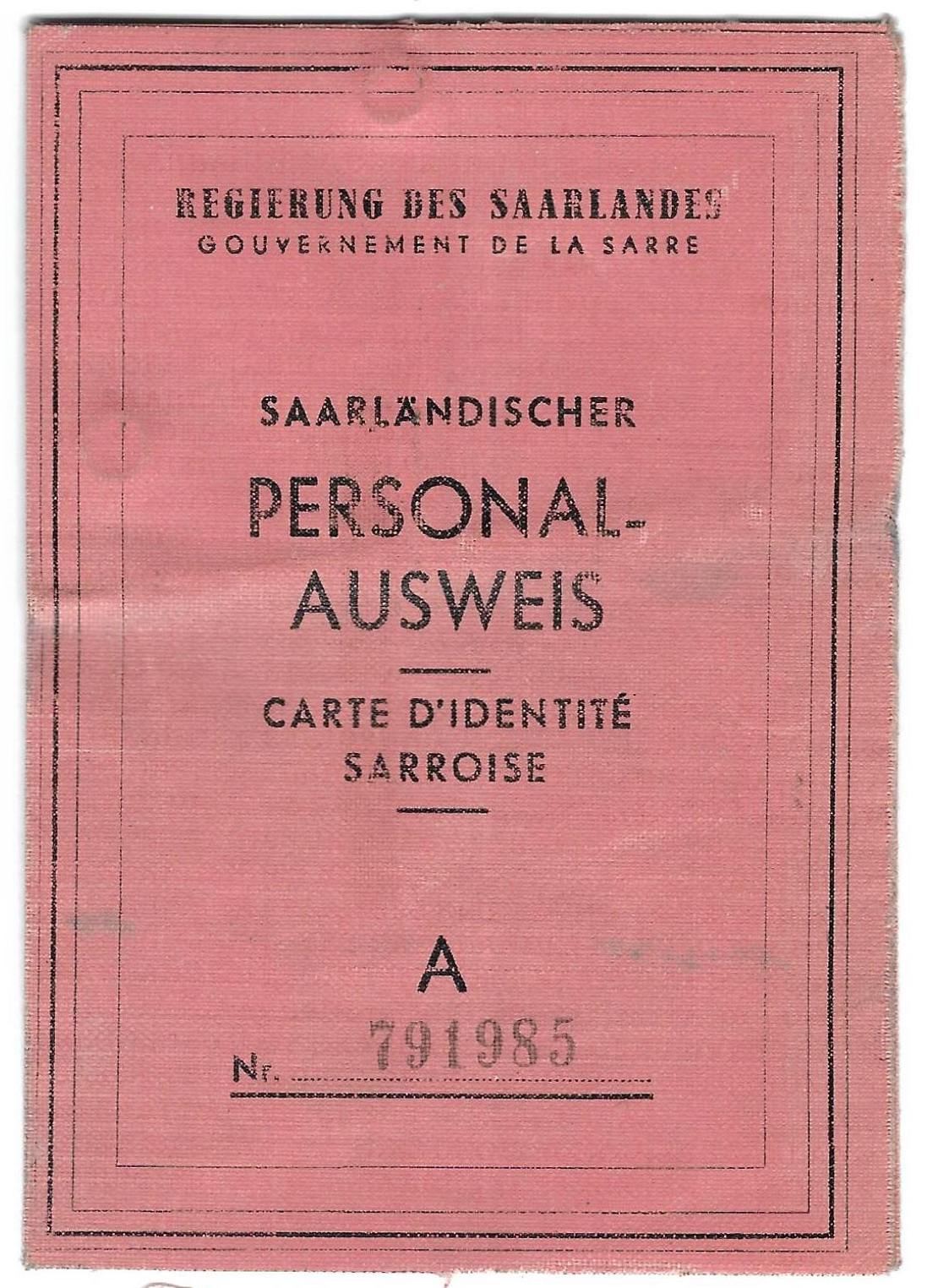
1953 SAAR ID issued under the French occupation of the territory.

In 1948, the French government established Saarland University under the auspices of the University of Nancy. It is the principal university in the state, the other being Saarland University of Applied Sciences (HTW Saar).

The Saarland was headed by a military governor from 30 August 1945: Gilbert Yves Edmond Grandval (1904–1981), who remained, on 1 January 1948, as High Commissioner, and from January 1952 – June 1955 as the first of two French ambassadors, his successor being Éric de Carbonnel (1910–1965) until 1956. Saarland, however, was allowed a regional administration very early, consecutively headed by:

- a president of the Government:
  - 31 July 1945 – 8 June 1946: Hans Neureuther, non-partisan
- a chairman of the (until 15 December 1947, Provisional) Administration Commission:
  - 8 June 1946 – 20 December 1947: Erwin Müller (1906–1968), non-partisan
- Minister-presidents (as in any state):
  - 20 December 1947 – 29 October 1955: Johannes Hoffmann (1890–1967), CVP
  - 29 October 1955 – 10 January 1956: Heinrich Welsch (1888–1976), non-partisan
  - 10 January 1956 – 4 June 1957: Hubert Ney (1892–1984), CDU

In 1954, France and the Federal Republic of Germany (West Germany) developed a detailed plan called the Saarstatut (Saar Statute) to establish an independent Saarland. It was signed as an agreement between the two countries on 23 October 1954 as one of the Paris Pacts, but a plebiscite held on 23 October 1955 rejected it by 67.7%.

On 27 October 1956, the Saar Treaty declared that Saarland should be allowed to join West Germany, which it did on 1 January 1957. This was the last significant international border change in Europe until the fall of Communism over 30 years later.

The Saarland's unification with West Germany was sometimes referred to as the Kleine Wiedervereinigung ('little reunification', in contrast with the post-Cold War reunification with the GDR). After unification, the Saar franc remained as the territory's currency until West Germany's Deutsche Mark replaced it on 7 July 1959. The Saar Treaty established that French, not English as in the rest of West Germany, should remain the first foreign language taught in Saarland schools; this provision was still largely followed after it was no longer binding.

Since 1971, Saarland has been a member of SaarLorLux, a euroregion created from Saarland, Lorraine, Luxembourg, Rhineland Palatinate, and Wallonia.

== Geography ==
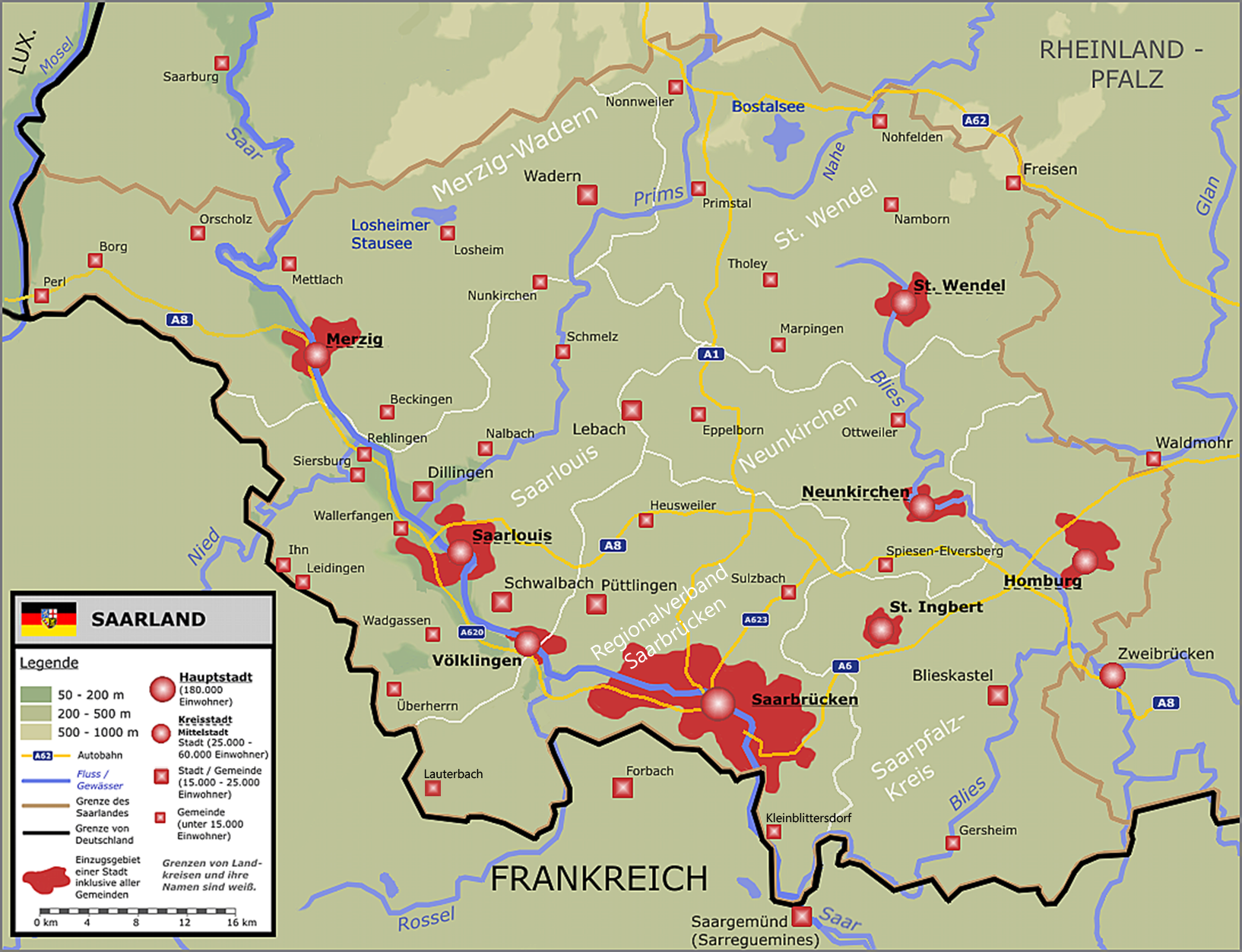
Topographic map of Saarland

The state borders France (department of Moselle, which forms part of the region of Grand Est) to the south and west, Luxembourg (Grevenmacher District) to the west and Rhineland-Palatinate to the north and the east. It is named after the river Saar, a tributary of the Moselle (itself a tributary of the Rhine), which runs through the state from the south to the northwest.

Saarland has about the same area as neighboring Luxembourg: Luxembourg is 2,586 km² (998 sq mi) and Saarland is 2,570 km² (992 sq mi). Within Germany, it is slightly larger than the combined area of the three city-states (Berlin, Bremen, and Hamburg) but is by far the smallest of the Flächenländer (states other than city states). It is less than one sixth the size of Schleswig-Holstein, the next smallest German state. One third of the land area of the Saarland is covered by forest, one of the highest percentages in Germany. The state is generally hilly; the highest mountain is the Dollberg with a height of 695.4 m (2,281 ft).

Most inhabitants live in a city agglomeration on the French border, surrounding the capital of Saarbrücken.

See also List of places in Saarland.

- Saar-Warndt coal mining basin

=== Districts ===
Borders of districts and municipalities of Saarland (cities in dark-yellow)

Districts of Saarland

Saarland is divided into six districts (German: Landkreise):

1. Merzig-Wadern
2. Neunkirchen
3. Saarbrücken
4. Saarlouis
5. Saarpfalz-Kreis
6. Sankt Wendel

== Demographics ==
Historical population
Year	Pop.	±% p.a.
1926	769,300	—
1930	794,500	+0.81%
1935	814,576	+0.50%
1940	812,753	−0.04%
1945	745,612	−1.71%
1950	948,716	+4.94%
1955	996,238	+0.98%
1960	1,060,493	+1.26%
1965	1,127,354	+1.23%
1970	1,121,300	−0.11%
1975	1,096,333	−0.45%
1980	1,066,299	−0.55%
1985	1,045,936	−0.38%
1990	1,072,963	+0.51%
1995	1,084,370	+0.21%
2000	1,066,470	−0.33%
2011	999,623	−0.59%
2022	1,006,864	+0.07%

Significant foreign resident populations
Nationality	Population (31 December 2022)
Syria	30,470
Italy	18,620
Ukraine	16,810
Turkey	12,260
France	11,305
Romania	9,510
Poland	6,095
Bulgaria	5,180
Luxembourg	4,870
Kosovo	2,910

=== Largest cities ===
The following table shows the ten largest cities of Saarland:

Pos.	Name	Pop. 2017	Area (km^{2})	Pop. per km^{2}
1	Saarbrücken	180,966	168	1,080
2	Neunkirchen	46,767	75	621
3	Homburg (Saar)	41,934	83	508
4	Völklingen	39,376	67	587
5	Sankt Ingbert	35,951	50	720
6	Saarlouis	34,532	43	798
7	Merzig	29,818	109	274
8	Sankt Wendel	25,959	114	229
9	Blieskastel	20,770	108	192
10	Dillingen	20,143	22	914

=== Religion ===
Religion in Saarland – 31 December 2025
Religion	Percent
Roman Catholics	45.1%
EKD Protestants	14.1%
None or other	40.8%

Saarland is the most religious state in Germany and has the highest concentration of Roman Catholics of any German state. The adherents of the Catholic Church comprise 45.1% of the population, organised in the two dioceses of Trier (comprising the formerly Prussian part of Saarland) and Speyer (for the smaller eastern formerly Palatine part). 14.1% of the Saarlandic population adhere to the Protestant Church in Germany (Evangelische Kirche in Deutschland, EKD), organised in the two Landeskirchen named Evangelical Church in the Rhineland and Evangelical Church of the Palatinate, both following the same former territorial partition. 40.8% are not affiliated with one of these churches.

In 2026, a reference to God was added to the preamble of the Saarland's state constitution.

== Politics ==
Except for the periods between 1985 and 1999, as well as since 2022 – when the centre-left Social Democratic Party of Germany (SPD) has held a majority of seats in the Landtag (state diet) – the centre-right Christian Democratic Union (CDU) has governed the Saarland, either alone or in coalition, since the accession of the state to the Federal Republic of Germany in 1957.

After the 2022 state elections the previous Grand Coalition between the CDU and SPD, the two largest parties in the Landtag, was replaced by an SPD majority government, the only single-party majority government of any German state, led by minister-president Anke Rehlinger.

=== Current government of the Saarland ===
Office	Incumbent	Since	Party
Minister-president of the Saarland	Anke Rehlinger	2022	SPD
Vice Minister-president of the Saarland and Minister for the Economy, Innovation, Digital Matters and Energy	Jürgen Barke	2022	SPD
Minister for the Interior, Construction and Sport	Reinhold Jost	2022	SPD
Minister for Education and Culture	Christine Streichert-Clivot	2019	SPD
Minister of Justice and Minister for the Environment and Consumer Protection	Petra Berg	2022	SPD
Minister for Social Affairs, Health, Women, and the Family	Magnus Jung	2022	SPD
Minister for Finance and Science	Jakob von Weizsäcker	2022	SPD
Head of the State Chancellery	David Lindemann	2022	SPD

== Economy ==
The gross domestic product (GDP) of the state was €35.4 billion in 2018, accounting for 1.1% of German economic output. GDP per capita adjusted for purchasing power was €32,800 or 109% of the EU27 average in the same year. The GDP per employee was 93% of the EU average. The GDP per capita was the second lowest of all states in West Germany.

Important income sources are the automobile industry, steel industry, ceramic industry and computer science and information systems industry. In the past, coal mining was an important branch of industry. However, the last coal mine in Saarland closed in 2012, ending 250 years of coal mining history in the region. The decision to close the mines was motivated by safety concerns about earthquakes in the region.

The unemployment rate stood at 5.8% in October 2018 and was higher than the national average but below the EU28 average.

Year	2000	2001	2002	2003	2004	2005	2006	2007	2008	2009	2010	2011	2012	2013	2014	2015	2016	2017	2018
Unemployment rate in %	9.8	9.0	9.1	9.5	9.2	10.7	9.9	8.4	7.3	7.7	7.5	6.8	6.7	7.3	7.3	7.3	7.2	6.7	6.1

== Education ==
Education in Saarland, follows the standard three-tiered structure of the German public system while maintaining strong ties to its cross-border location. After Grundschule (primary school), which typically lasts four years, students move into one of three main secondary tracks: Gymnasium, Gemeinschaftsschule, or Berufsschulen. The Gymnasium track prepares students for academic studies and ends with the Abitur (higher education entrance qualification); in Saarland, it generally runs for eight years (G8). The Gemeinschaftsschule is a comprehensive secondary school offering various certificates, often integrating vocational preparation Berufsschulen are vocational schools central to the Dual System of training, where apprentices combine part-time classroom instruction with practical, on-the-job training at a company.

Saarland is home to several key institutions that drive regional research and cross-border cooperation, including the administrative headquarters of the Franco-German University (DFH) in Saarbrücken.

Saarland University (Universität des Saarlandes), located primarily in Saarbrücken and Homburg, is particularly noted for its excellence in Computer Science and European Law, benefiting from its unique European location. The University of Applied Sciences (Hochschule für Technik und Wirtschaft des Saarlandes - HTW) focuses on practical engineering, economics, and social sciences, maintaining strong links with the region's industrial base.

A unique feature of higher education in the state is the Franco-German component, as Saarland University runs several integrated Franco-German programs and maintains close partnerships with institutions in neighboring France, fostering strong multilingual academic environments.

== Transport ==
The region's main airport is Saarbrücken Airport which provides some domestic and European flights; it is located 13.7 km (9 mi) east of Saarbrücken. Generally, residents of the state would also use Luxembourg Airport and Frankfurt Airport, which both provide more domestic and international flights.

== Culture ==
=== Local dialect ===
People in the Saarland speak Rhine Franconian (in the southeast, very similar to that dialect spoken in the western part of the Palatinate) and Moselle Franconian (in the northwest, very similar to that dialect spoken along the river Moselle and the cities of Trier or even in Luxembourg). Outside of the Saarland, specifically the Rhine-Franconian variant spoken in the state capital Saarbrücken is generally considered to be the Saarland dialect. The two dialect regions are mainly separated by the das / dat isogloss; in the northwestern portion of the state, including cities such as Saarlouis, standard German das is pronounced with a final [t] instead of an [s].

In general, both dialects are an integral part of Saarland identity.

Both dialects, particularly in their respective Saarland flavour, share many characteristic features, some of which will be explained below.

Women and girls are often referred to using the neuter pronoun es, with the pronunciation being something like Ähs ([ɛːs]): Ähs hat mir's gesaat ('it told me so', instead of 'she told me so'; vs. High German: Sie hat es mir gesagt). This stems from the word Mädchen (girl) being neuter (es is correct when referring to words like Mädchen but would not be used by itself in reference to a woman).

The subjunctive in Rhine Franconian is normally composed with the words dääd ([dɛːt]) (High German täte = "would do") or gänge ("would go") as auxiliary verbs: Isch dääd saan, dass... ("I would say that...") instead of the High German Ich würde sagen, dass....

Declension is rather different:

- The genitive case does not exist at all and is entirely replaced by constructs with the dative case.
- In most instances, words are not altered when in the dative case. Exceptions are mostly pronouns.
- The same holds for the accusative case. It is accepted practice to use the nominative case instead of the accusative.

Diphthongs are less common than in Standard German. This is because the Standard German diphthongs ei and au are each the result of a merger of two Middle High German vowels – however, these mergers did not take place in the Saarland, and only one of the two merged vowels is pronounced as a diphthong. The front rounded vowels ö, ü, and eu are replaced by e, i, and ei respectively.

Both the Rhine Franconian and Moselle Franconian dialects (and Luxembourgish) have merged the palatal fricative sound as in ich with the post-alveolar fricative as in frisch 'fresh', causing High German minimal pairs such as Kirche 'church' and Kirsche 'cherry' to be pronounced in the same way, that being (in the Saarbrücken variety) kersch ([kɛɐ̯ɕ]).

French has had a considerable influence on the vocabulary, although the pronunciation of imported French words is usually quite different from their originals. Popular examples include Trottwaa (from trottoir), Fissääl (from ficelle), and the imperative or greeting aalleh! (from allez!).

The English sentence "My house is green" is pronounced almost the same in the Rhine Franconian variant: Mei Haus is grien [maɪ̯ haʊ̯s ɪs gʁiːn]. The main difference lies in the pronunciation of the ⟨r⟩ sound.

Regional beer brewer Karlsberg has taken advantage of the Saarlandish dialect to create clever advertising for its staple product, UrPils. Examples include a trio of men enjoying a beer, flanked by baby carriages, the slogan reading "Mutter schafft" (meaning "Mum's at work" in Saarlandish, but plays on the High German word Mutterschaft 'motherhood'); another depicts a trio of men at a bar, with one realizing his beer has been drunk by one of the others, the slogan reading "Kenner war's" (meaning "It was no one" [Keiner war es] in Saarlandish, but playing on the High German word Kenner 'connoisseur', translating to "It was a connoisseur"); a third shows an empty beer crate in outer space, the text reading "All" (meaning "empty" in Saarlandish, but playing on the same High German word meaning "outer space").

=== French ===
The French language has a special standing in Saarland due to its geographical proximity to France. Today, a part of the population is able to speak French, and it is compulsory at many schools. Saarbrücken is also home to a bilingual "Deutsch-Französisches Gymnasium" (German-French high school). In January 2014 the Saarland state government announced its aim of making the region fully bilingual in German and French by 2043.

== Sports ==
The Saar competed in the qualifying section of the 1954 FIFA World Cup, but failed after coming second to West Germany but ahead of Norway. It also competed as Saar in the 1952 Summer Olympics and the field handball world championships in the beginning of the 1950s.

== Museums ==
- Airplane exhibition Hermeskeil (Flugausstellung Peter Junior Hermeskeil)
- Bergwerk Göttelborn
- Bergwerk Reden
- Feinmechanisches Museum Fellenbergmühle
- Grube Düppenweiler
- Haus Ludwig
- Hillfort of Otzenhausen
- Historic Museum Saar
- Kunstforum Baden-Badener Versicherung, a former art museum from 1992 to 2016
- Roman Villa Borg
- Roman Villa Nennig
- Römermuseum Schwarzenacker
- Saarlandmuseum
- Saarschleife
- Saarlandish Mining Museum Bexbach
- Saarlandish Watchmuseum Püttlingen
- German newspaper museum
- Saarländisches Zweiradmuseum
- Castle-mountain caves Homburg
- Velsen adventure mine
- Völklingen Ironworks UNESCO World heritage site
- Wolves park Werner Freund
- Zentrum für Biodokumentation

== See also ==
- German trawler V 411 Saarland - a fishing boat and World War II vorpostenboot named for the state
