= Gilbert Grandval =

French Resistance activist (1904–1981)

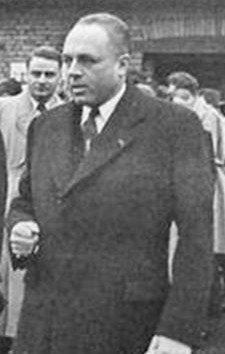

French Representative to the Saar Protectorate
- In office 1945–1955
- Prime Minister: Johannes Hoffmann; Heinrich Welsch
- Preceded by: Position established
- Succeeded by: Charles de Carbonne

Personal details
- Born: Yves Gilbert Edmond Hirsch; 12 February 1904 Paris, France
- Died: 29 November 1981 (aged 77) Saint-Cloud, France
- Spouse(s): Simone Octavie Léa Mapou; Yvonne Schwenter
- Children: 3 (Bertrand, Christine and Gérard)

Gilbert Grandval (born Gilbert Hirsch, subsequently Gilbert Hirsch-Ollendorff; 12 February 1904 – 29 November 1981) was a French Resistance activist who went on to become the military governor of the Saarland in 1945. He remained in post for a decade, although the nature of the job evolved and there were changes of title in 1948 and again in 1952 when he became, formally, the French ambassador to the Saarland. Subsequently, he became a government minister during the early years of the Fifth Republic.

Gilbert Grandval was the alias Hirsch-Ollendorff used from approximately 1943 while working with the Resistance. Subsequently, he was authorized permanently to substitute the Grandval name for the family name with which he had been born, both on his own account and on behalf of his father. The authorization came from a decree signed on 25 February 1946 by the President of the postwar provisional government, and officially transcribed at the appropriate town hall on 12 March 1948.

== Life ==
=== Provenance and early years ===
Yves Gilbert Edmond Hirsch was born at his parents' home along the Rue La Boétie in the 8th arrondissement of Paris. Edmond Hirsch (1873-), his father, was a book dealer who expanded the family business to include a publisher of school books. Gilbert's grandfather, Henri Hirsch (1829-) had also been a book dealer. The Hirsch family traced their origins back to Strasbourg, but after the frontier changes of 1871 they were given and took up the option of retaining French citizenship, which meant leaving Alsace.

His mother, born Jeanne Ollendorff (1880-), was the daughter of Paul Ollendorff (1851-1920), another book dealer, and a publisher who numbered Guy de Maupassant among his authors. It may have been on account of the name recognition than the Ollendorff family enjoyed that while he was still a child the family took to using the family name Hirsch-Ollendorff.

Gilbert Hirsch-Ollendorff was born into a Jewish family but with the post-revolutionary French state deeply committed to "Laïcité" he seems to have been able to carry his religion lightly: at some stage he converted to Roman Catholicism. Nevertheless, as Gilbert grew up the family was part of the city's Jewish intellectual community: their social circle included the family of Léon Blum, who also traced his family origins back to Alsace.

He received his schooling at the prestigious Lycée Condorcet, close to the family home. In compliance with his family's wishes he then embarked on the study of medicine. That study was interrupted between 1924 and 1926 when he was required to perform military service. He never returned to medicine. Instead he used his contacts to find work with Saint-Gobain, a major manufacturer of chemicals and glass-based products. He rose quickly through management ranks to become a sales director with the fertilizers division, based in Lyon. During the 1930s, like many upwardly mobile young executives, he obtained a pilot's license, apparently from motives which were, at the time, purely recreational and social.

=== War and resistance ===
France declared war on Germany, in response to the German-Soviet invasion of Poland, in September 1939. Gilbert Hirsch-Ollendorff was by now an experienced pilot. He was almost immediately conscripted into the Air Force and given the rank of " lieutenant". He was deployed in a reconnaissance squadron and later as a fighter pilot in northern France. The German invasion was launched on 10 May 1940 and ended six weeks later in France's military defeat on 22 June. The southern half of France was placed under the administration of an (initially semi-autonomous) puppet government while the northern half of the country was placed under direct military occupation. Gilbert Hirsch-Ollendorff was demobilised and on 17 August 1940 returned to work in the chemicals business.

Général de Gaulle's famous rallying speech was transmitted from London on 18 June 1940, and during the same month Hirsch-Ollendorff made contact. He became a member of the Ceux de la Résistance ("Those of the Resistance" / CDLR) group in 1941. Although, in the first instance, he retained doubts about the Resistance, one of his early assignments involved finding more recruits for it. From 9 June 1942, threatened with Gestapo persecution, he "disappeared underground". In November of that same year he became the CDLR's head of military organisation in the area designated by the movement as "Region C", which comprised eight eastern departments including three - those comprising Alsace-Moselle - that for historical and linguistic reasons the Germans were treating as fully integrated parts of the German state (Gau Baden-Elsaß and Gau Westmark). Most of the rest of "Region C" was defined by the Germans as the "Forbidden zone" "Zone interdite", subjected to tighter military control and a more punitive régime in respect of the civilian population than most of occupied France. On 6 August 1943, while on a trip to Paris, he was arrested by German occupation troops. He was released two days later "for lack of evidence against him". After this his commitment to the Resistance was evidently total. He used a range of cover names: "Chancel", "Pasteur", "Berger", "Planète" and "Grandval". He was seen to be acquiring enhanced leadership potential, with an intimate appreciation of the organisation's structures and hierarchies. Additional military responsibilities arrived in due course along with promotion to the rank of colonel. Within resistance circles Grandval (as he increasingly came to be known among comrades) was identified, like his direct superior in the resistance organisation, General Kœnig, as a committed de Gaulle loyalist. Another senior resistance member in the region with whom he worked on the national directorate of the CDLR was the future prime minister, Michel Debré.

France's liberation arrived from the west, with Paris freed during the final part of August 1944. The Provisional Government under Charles de Gaulle established itself in Paris on 25 August 1944. In Lorraine the important city of Nancy was liberated by the Third United States Army a month later. It is claimed that two days before the American army entered the city itself Grandval with his resistance forces had already extinguished the last remnants of the German military presence, but the truth of the matter is hard to pin down. There certainly was an ongoing fractiousness between Grandval and US military officers whom he came across during his subsequent career. De Gaulle visited the city on 25 September 1944 and personally greeted local resistance leaders including Grandval, on whom he conferred the Order of the Liberation. It was Grandval's first encounter with the General whom over the previous four years he had known only as a familiar voice emerging through the crackling of radio waves. Grandval could now style himself a Companion of the Liberation. In 1946 he was also made a Knight of the Legion of Honour.

On 25 September 1944. at de Gaulle's insistence, André Diethelm, the Minister for War in the new government, appointed Grandval as military commander of the 20th Military Region (i.e. the Nancy region). He gained valuable experience, reconfiguring the local resistance era "Forces of the Interior" into appropriate postwar military structures, and also rebuilding the underpinnings of civil society which during the occupation years had fallen into the hands of now discredited Vichy officials. With something approaching postwar normality appearing on the horizon, Grandval let his family know that he was preparing for a return to civilian life and the world of business. That was not to be, however.

=== Saar protectorate ===
After the war it was Grandval's intention to return to the private sector. It took Général de Gaulle to change his mind:

- "Thirty months earlier, because of my Resistance activity, I had had to become completely hidden, and temporarily to give up my career as Commercial Director of an industrial conglomerate of chemical products. Now I had decided to take back what had been, since 1927, my conventional career trajectory. It was Général de Gaulle, whom I had approached with regard to taking a vacation, who made it clear just how difficult he found to admit even to himself the extent to which all the comrades who had stood with him shoulder to shoulder were now all choosing to return to their former lives, rather than continuing to pursue with him tasks that were in the national interest. I had no choice but to accept a position in the French occupation zone of Germany."
- "Trente mois plus tôt, j'avais été dans l'obligation, du fait de mon activité résistante, de devenir totalement clandestin et de renoncer provisoirement à exercer mon métier de Directeur Commercial d'une entreprise industrielle de produits chimiques. J'avais décidé de reprendre ce qui, depuis 1927, était le cours normal de ma vie. C'est alors que le Général de Gaulle, auprès de qui j'étais allé prendre congé, me fit savoir qu'il lui était difficile d'admettre que tous ceux qui avaient combattu à ses côtés retrouvent leur activité antérieure, plutôt que de poursuivre avec lui une tache d'intérêt national. Je devais accepter d'occuper un poste en zone française d'occupation en Allemagne"

Gilbert Grandval quoted by Dieter Marc Schneider

With the western two thirds of Germany after May 1945 divided into four military occupation zones, de Gaulle's plans for Grandval involved appointing him military governor in Baden-Baden, as "right-hand" to General Kœnig, with whom he had already worked very closely during the closing months of the war. Grandval was not interested in such a political-diplomatic posting, however. Plans were then developed for him to be offered the military governorship of the Saarland, a highly industrialised region with a unique political and economic status, where it was felt that Grandval's hands-on experience of the industrial sector could be particularly valuable. The region's mines were seen by the French government as a valuable source of future war reparations. Grandval took some persuading, and indeed sought the advice of his old family friend Léon Blum. However, he accepted and on 30 August 1945 was appointed as France's Military Governor ("Délégué Supérieur") of the region, taking up his posting on 7 September 1945. His mandate from the head of the French government was to establish a special administrative dispensation, as far as possible with the consent of the population. Looking ahead, it was hoped that in the event of another referendum on the matter, voters in the Saarland might be persuaded to back union with France in preference to a return to a German state. Grandval expected to remain in post for a few months, at most half a year.

As early as March 1945, in a telephone call, the Minister for War, André Diethelm, had impressed on Grandval the importance the French president attached to establishing a significant French military presence in the Saar region. De Gaulle had backed up his wish by sending two battalions of the 26th Infantry Regiment towards the Saar and Palatinate regions. These had found their movements held up by the Americans, but on 10 April, when he inspected French troops at Scheidt, Grandval was able to report back that "the Americans were there, but the French were there too, as Général de Gaulle wished". In persuading the American commanders on the ground to comply with the government level decisions concerning French military administration being applied in the French military occupation zone, he exercised a range of political and human negotiating skills, and he was also able to see to it that for the important coal mines to be restarted, it would be necessary for the Americans military personnel to relinquish control in favour of specialists from the French Mines Commission.

Despite the military nature of his posting, Grandval's preoccupations were increasingly with tangible fundamentals of the region's civilian economy: coal, steel and reconstruction. During a brief visit in May 1945, prior to his appointment he had determined that these were the most urgent concerns. Industry had to be restarted to boost the desperately depressed regional economy and restore people's livelihoods. That would also ensure war reparations to France (chiefly in the form of brown coal). He invited the Paris government to entrust him with doing what was necessary, and that is what happened.

At the end of 1947 a new constitution was implemented in the Saarland. Preparation of the constitution had involved extensive wrangling between the wartime allies, but the appointment of Gilbert Grandval as High Commissioner, following the abolition of the post of Military Governor for the region, provided an element of continuity. His reports to Paris went now not to the Ministry for War but to the Ministry of Foreign Affairs. His main task was to ensure that the (now democratically elected) regional government passed no resolutions or laws that might endanger the region's autonomy (in relation to West Germany) or jeoparise the economic customs union with France.

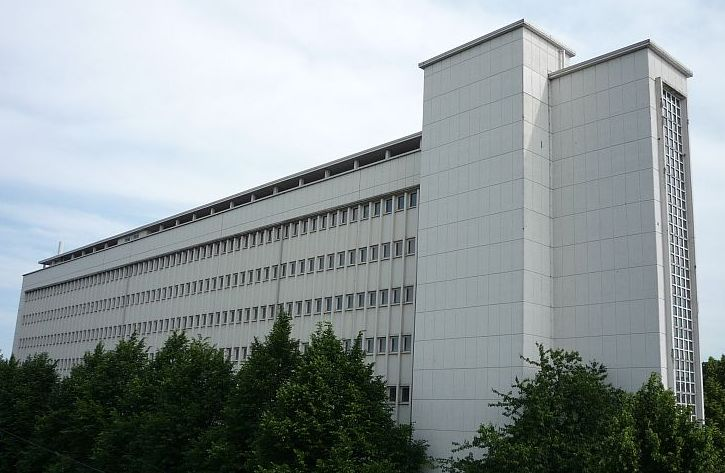
In 1954 Grandval moved his ambassador's office to a building designed for the purpose by Georges-Henri Pingusson

His title changed again on 25 January 1952, when the French government appointed Grandval as Ambassador and Head of the French Diplomatic Mission to the Saar Protectorate. By this time, with Cold War tensions intensifying on the far side of Germany, the French government, taking its lead from western allies, was developing a more collaborational relationship with the western occupation zones of Germany which had been relaunched, in May 1949, as the German Federal Republic ("Bundesrepublik Deutschland" / West Germany). Despite his new title, Grandval was still mandated to appeal against any new changes in law proposed by the regional government, if he thought the autonomous relationship of the region in relation to West Germany, or its customs union with France, were challenged. In 1954 he moved his ambassador's office to a modernist concrete building designed for the purpose by Georges-Henri Pingusson. Grandval's ten-year stay in Saarbrücken was by now entering its final phase: it is not known whether he ever took the opportunity to move his family home from Schloss Halberg, on the southside of the city, where the Grandvals had lived since 1946, to the massive concrete building in the city centre.

On 25 January 1955 the West German ambassador in Paris, Herbert Blankenhorn (who was known to be a close confidant of Chancellor Adenauer) agreed with Georges Henri Soutou, France's deputy cabinet head, that Grandval's Saarland posting should end three months before the Saar Statute referendum, scheduled for October of that year. It was widely (but wrongly) anticipated that voters would back a settlement that gave the region autonomy under the auspices of the Western European Union, while retaining its postwar economic and customs union with France. Grandval's successor would be Eric de Carbonnel, a career diplomat and a less forceful personality. A valedictory reception was held on 30 June 1955, featuring a moving speech by Grandval himself. His mission, he said, had been "one of the most uplifting tasks that could be given to any Frenchman" ("eine der erhebendsten Aufgaben, die heute einem Franzosen gestellt werden können").

=== Towards the Fifth Republic ===
There followed a brief posting as French Résident général in Morocco. This appointment had become public knowledge because of an article in Der Spiegel back in April 1954. The Sultan had fiercely objected on account of Grandval's presumed Judaism. The posting nevertheless went ahead, formally with effect from 20 June 1955. However, Grandval resigned after fifty-five days over "differences" with the policies of the French government led by Edgar Faure.

In September 1958 he was appointed to a government position as Secretary of State for the French merchant navy, in succession to Maurice-René Simonnet. He remained in this post for more than two years: the period was one of significant transition. Gilbert Grandval, like many of his generation, retained a deep personal and political loyalty towards Général de Gaulle, who during this period returned to power and inaugurated the "Fifth Republic". Grandval saw himself as a "lefwing Gaullist" and was a founder member of a new political party, the Democratic Labour Union (Union démocratique du travail / UDT) which was a slightly incongruous (and, as an independent party, short-lived) alternative to the mainstream Gaullist Union for the New Republic (" L'Union pour la nouvelle République" / UNR) party. The UDT was notable for containing "strong personalities", but gained little traction with the electorate.

On 14 April 1962 he was appointed Secretary of state (junior minister) for Overseas Trade in the new government under Prime Minister Georges Pompidou. That appointment was of short duration, however, since on 15 May 1962 he entered Pompidou's cabinet, taking over from Paul Bacon as Minister of Labour. A new government took over on 8 January 1966, putting an end to Grandval's ministerial career. There now came a return to the private section in July 1966 when he became president of the venerable Messageries Maritimes shipping company. He retired from the position in 1972.

After his departure from government, Grandval remained politically engaged. In 1971 he became chair of the "Union Travailliste", a new breakaway faction within the Gaullist political family of little long-term significance.
