= Hubert Ney =

German politician (1892–1984)

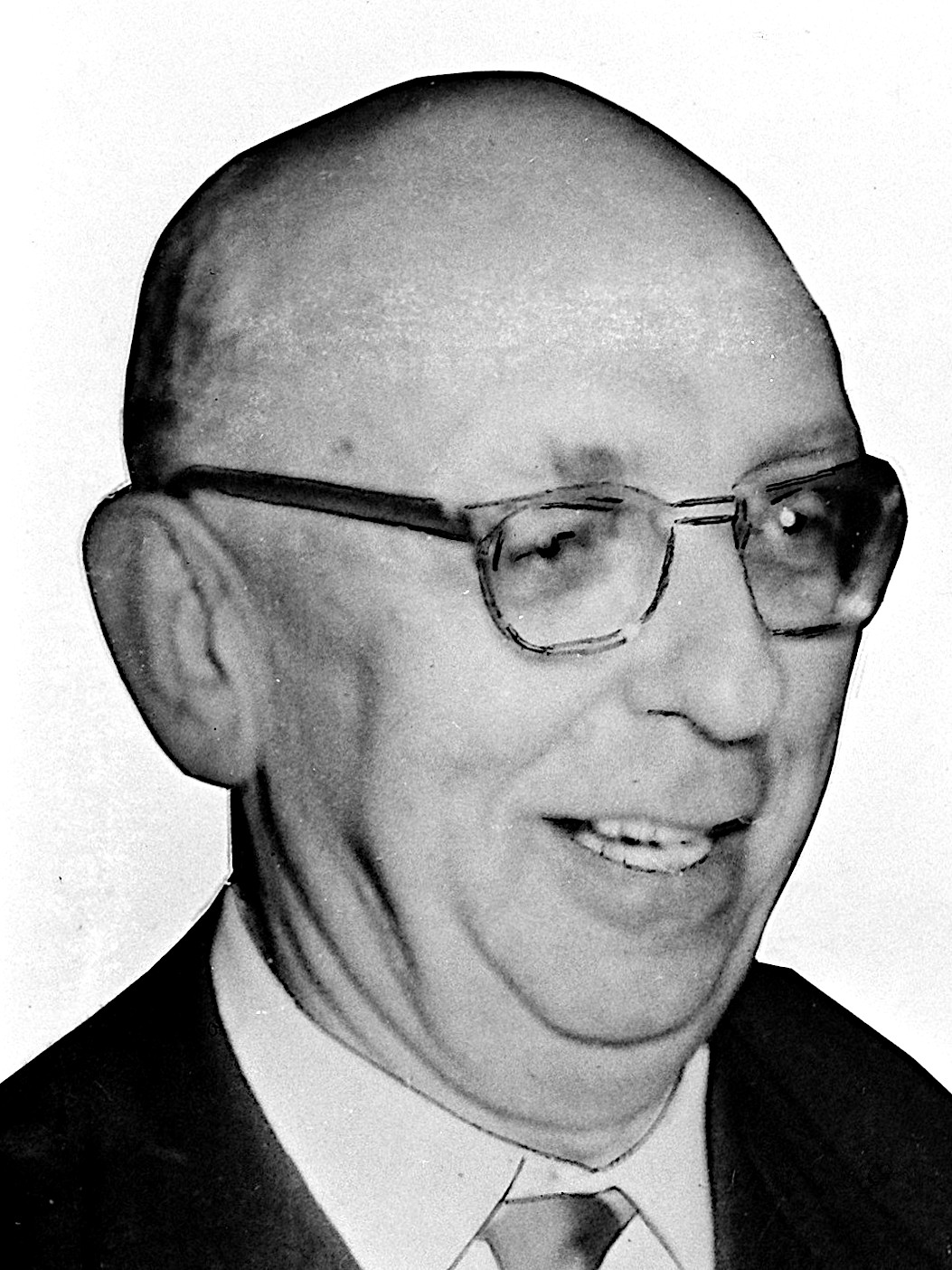

Minister President of the Saarland (Saar Protectorate)
- In office 1956–1956
- Preceded by: Heinrich Welsch
- Succeeded by: position abolished (Egon Reinert as minister-president of the state of Saarland)

Personal details
- Born: 12 October 1892
- Died: 3 February 1984 (aged 91) Saarlouis, Saarland, West Germany
- Party: Christian People's Party of Saarland (CVP)
- Education: University of Freiburg University of Bonn

Hubert Ney (12 October 1892 – 3 February 1984) was a German politician (Zentrum, CVP, CDU) and Minister President of Saarland (1956). He was born and died in Saarlouis.

He was related to Michel Ney.

== Life and career ==
Hubert Ney started studying law at the Universities of Freiburg, Munich and Bonn which was interrupted by his service in the First World War. During his service in the German expeditionary force in 1918, he lost his right arm. After the war he resumed his studies in Heidelberg again and became active in the Catholic student association K.St.V Palatia Heidelberg. He received his doctorate and settled in his hometown of Saarlouis as a lawyer. In 1920 he joined the Centre Party. In the referendum held on 13 January 1935, he spoke in favor of reincorporation of the Saarland into the German Reich.

In 1946 he founded the Christian People's Party of the Saar (CVP) together with Johannes Hoffmann and others. Unlike Hoffmann, Ney supported a connection of Saarland to Germany. In 1952 he became chairman of the CDU Saar, which was, however, banned at the time. In the referendum on 23 October 1955, like the other pro-German politicians he advocated a rejection of the European Saar statute.

After the Saar Statute was rejected by a large majority (67.7%), on the night of election day Johannes Hoffmann resigned as prime minister and Heinrich Welsch became interim minister-president, on 18 December 1955 state elections were held, from which the CDU emerged as the strongest party. Accordingly Hubert Ney was elected prime minister of Saarland on 10 January 1956 by the Saarland parliament, with a Grand Coalition government consisting of CDU, SPD and DPS.

On 1 January 1957, the Saarland became a state of the Federal Republic of Germany in accordance with Article 23 of the Basic Law. Ney was therefore Prime Minister of both the autonomous Saarland, as well as the new state. He stepped down on 4 June 1957 because of disputes within the coalition and with the federal party of the CDU, with Egon Reinert his successor. In 1959 Ney resigned from the CDU and founded the Christian-national community, but failed in the regional elections in 1960.

1964 Hermann Schwann tried in vain to win him over to the left-national-neutralist Action Commonwealth of Independent Germans of August Haußleiter. 1969 Ney called for a vote for the National Democratic Party.
