= Saar Protectorate =

French protectorate (1947–1956)

Saarland Saarland (German) Sarre (French)
- 1947–1956
- Flag Coat of arms
- Anthem: Saarlandlied
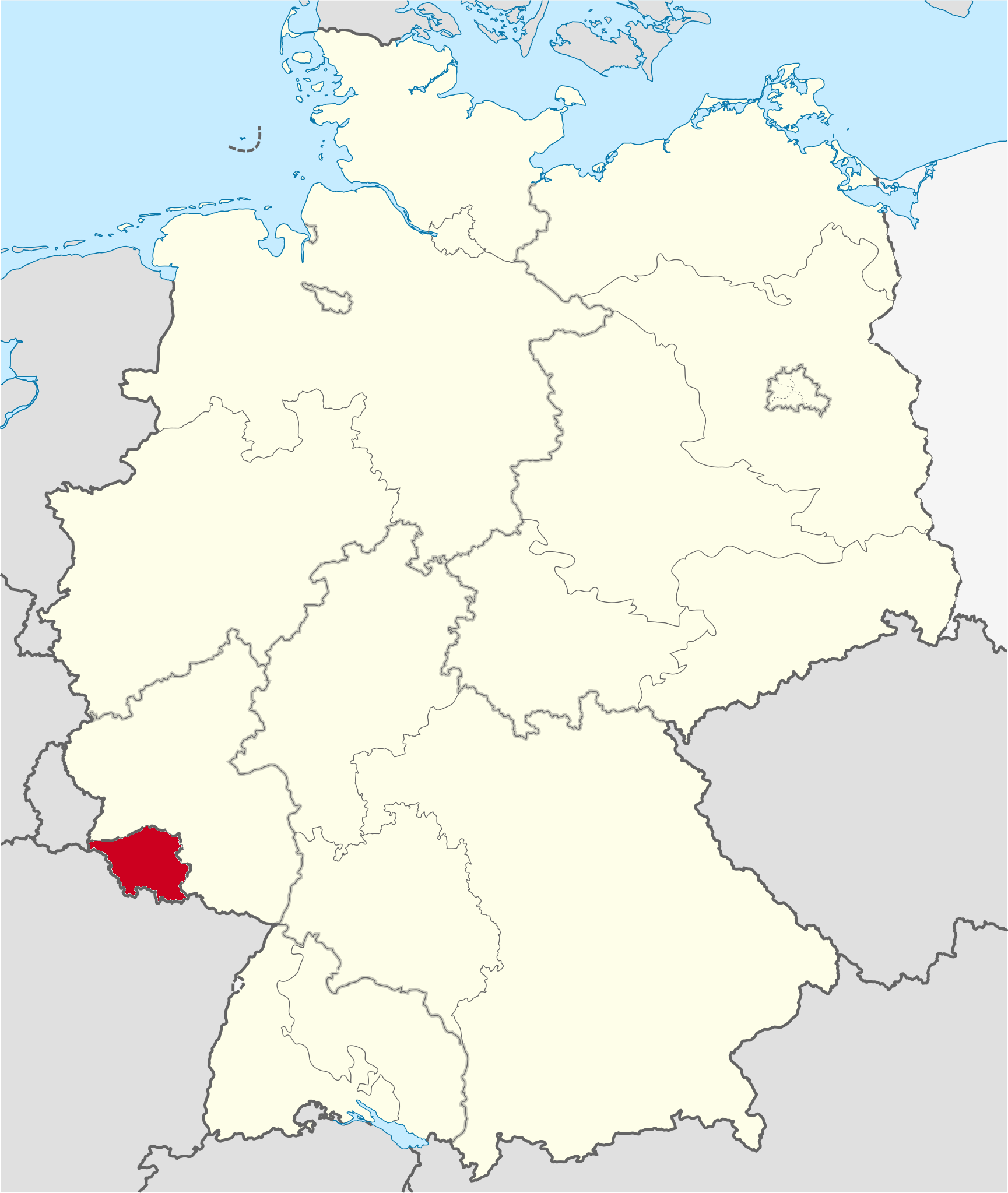
- Saar Protectorate (red) in 1947
- Status: Protectorate of France (Note: Saarland was an independent government within the economic sphere of France; France was responsible for defence and foreign affairs (cf. Preamble of Saarland's Constitution).) claimed by Germany
- Capital and largest city: Saarbrücken; 49°14′N 7°0′E
- Common languages: German; Rhine Franconian; Moselle Franconian
- Religion: Secular state
- Demonym: Saarlander or Saar
- Government: Unitary parliamentary republic
- French Representative
  - 1947–1955: Gilbert Grandval (Note: High Commissioner (1948–1952), Ambassador & Chief of the Diplomatic Mission (1952–1956).)
  - 1955–1956: Charles de Carbonnel (Note: Ambassador & Chief of the Diplomatic Mission.)
- Minister-President
  - 1947–1955: Johannes Hoffmann
  - 1955–1956: Heinrich Welsch
  - 1956: Hubert Ney
- Legislature: Landtag
- Historical era: Cold War
  - Establishment: 17 December 1947
  - Saar statute: 23 October 1954
  - Referendum: 23 October 1955
  - Saar Treaty: 27 October 1956
  - Integration into West Germany: 1 January 1957
- Currency: Reichsmark (1946–47); Saar mark (1947); French franc (1947–54); Saar franc (Note: French franc with German markings.) (1954–59)
Preceded by	Succeeded by
Gau Westmark	Saarland
- Today part of: Germany

The Saar Protectorate (German: Saarprotektorat [ˈzaːɐ̯pʁotɛktoˌʁaːt]; French: Protectorat de la Sarre), officially and commonly known as Saarland (French: Sarre), was a French protectorate and a disputed territory separated from Germany. On joining West Germany in 1957, it became the smallest "federal state" (Bundesland), the Saarland, not counting the "city states" (Stadtstaaten) of Berlin, Hamburg, and Bremen. It is named after the Saar River.

The region around the Saar River and its tributary valleys is a geologically folded, mineral-rich, ethnically German, economically important, and heavily industrialized area. It has well-developed transportation infrastructure, and was one of the centres of the Industrial Revolution in Germany. Around 1900, the region formed the third-largest area of coal, iron, and steel industry in Germany (after the Ruhr Area and the Upper Silesian Coal Basin). From 1920 to 1935, as a result of World War I, the region was under the control of the League of Nations as the Territory of the Saar Basin. In 1935, Nazi Germany established its full sovereignty over the territory.

Geographically, the post–World War II protectorate corresponded to the current German state of Saarland (established after its incorporation into West Germany as a state on 1 January 1957). A policy of industrial disarmament and dispersal of industrial workers was officially pursued by the Allies after the war until 1951. The region was made a protectorate of the French military occupation zone in Germany under French control in 1946. In 1947, Saarland promulgated a separate constitution. Cold War pressures for a stronger Germany allowed renewed industrialization, and the French returned control of the region to the government of West Germany founded on the American–British–French occupation zones. Historically, it was a disputed territory of West Germany as it was always opposed by the Soviet Union, one of the countries occupying Germany and a member of the Allied Control Council (ACC).

== History ==
The region of the Saar had been previously annexed by France (as the Bailiwick of Sarrelouis, 1685) and occupied during the French Revolution (1790–1798) and the Napoleonic Wars, when it had been included in the First French Empire as the Sarre department between 1798 and 1814.

=== Post–World War I ===
Under the Treaty of Versailles, the Saar was initially occupied by combat units from the United Kingdom and France. In 1920, Britain and France established a nominally independent occupation government for the League of Nations mandate of the Saar: the greater part of the area under its control was carved out of the Prussian Rhine Province and was supplemented by two Bavarian districts (Homburg and St. Ingbert) taken from the Rhenish Palatinate. This was sanctioned by a 15-year League of Nations mandate which stationed League of Nations troops from Italy, Sweden, and the United Kingdom in the Saar until 1935. The Saar's coal industry, the dominant industry in the region at the time, was nationalized and directly administered by France, in compensation for the destruction of French mines by the retreating Germans in 1918.

==== Plebiscite ====
On 13 January 1935, a plebiscite held in the territory at the end of the 15-year term, resulted in 90.7% of voters casting their ballot in favour of a return to Germany, and 0.4% voting for union with France. Others (8.9%) favoured the third option of a continued British–French occupation government. After political agitation and manoeuvring by Chancellor Adolf Hitler for the re-union of the Saarland with the German Reich (Rückgliederung des Saarlandes) it was reincorporated in 1935. Its area was not redivided among the Prussian Rhine Province and the Bavarian Palatinate, but united with the latter as the Gau of Saar-Palatinate (Saarpfalz). In 1942 it was renamed Westmark (Western March), as it was planned to be expanded to incorporate parts of German-occupied French Lorraine which, however, did not materialise.

=== Post–World War II ===
Germany in 1947: Saar Protectorate French occupation zone Rest of Allied-occupied Germany Polish-administrated former eastern territories of Germany

In July 1945, two months after World War II had ended in Europe, the Allied forces were redeploying from the areas they had conquered into their respective zones of occupation. On 10 July 1945, US forces left the Saar, and French troops established their occupational administration. On 16 February 1946, France disentangled the Saar from the Allied zones of occupation and established the separate Saar Protectorate, which was de facto no longer under the joint Allied jurisdiction by the Allied Control Council for Germany.

French officials deported a total of 1,820 people from the Saar in 1946 and 1947, most of whom ultimately were allowed to return. However, France had not agreed to the expulsions approved (without input from France) in the Potsdam agreement by the Allies, so France refused to accept war refugees or expellees from the eastern annexed territories in the Saar protectorate or the French zone. However, native Sarrois returning from Nazi-imposed removals (e.g. political and Jewish refugees) and war-related relocations (e.g. evacuation from air raids) were allowed to return to the areas under French control. France aimed at winning over the Saar population for a future annexation.

With effect from 20 July 1946, 109 municipalities of the Prussian Rhine Province within the French zone were added to the Saar Protectorate. By 18 December 1946 customs controls were established between the Saar and allied occupied Germany. By further territorial redeployments between the Saar Protectorate, constituted in early 1947, and neighbouring Rhineland-Palatinate (a new state established on 30 August 1946 in the French zone), 61 municipalities returned to Germany, while 13 other municipalities were ceded to the Saar Protectorate between 8 June 1947 and 1949, followed by one further Palatine municipality incorporated into the Saar in the latter year.

In the speech Restatement of Policy on Germany, given in Stuttgart on 6 September 1946, the US Secretary of State James F. Byrnes stated the US's motive in detaching the Saar from Germany as "The United States does not feel that it can deny to France, which has been invaded three times by Germany in 70 years, its claim to the Saar territory".

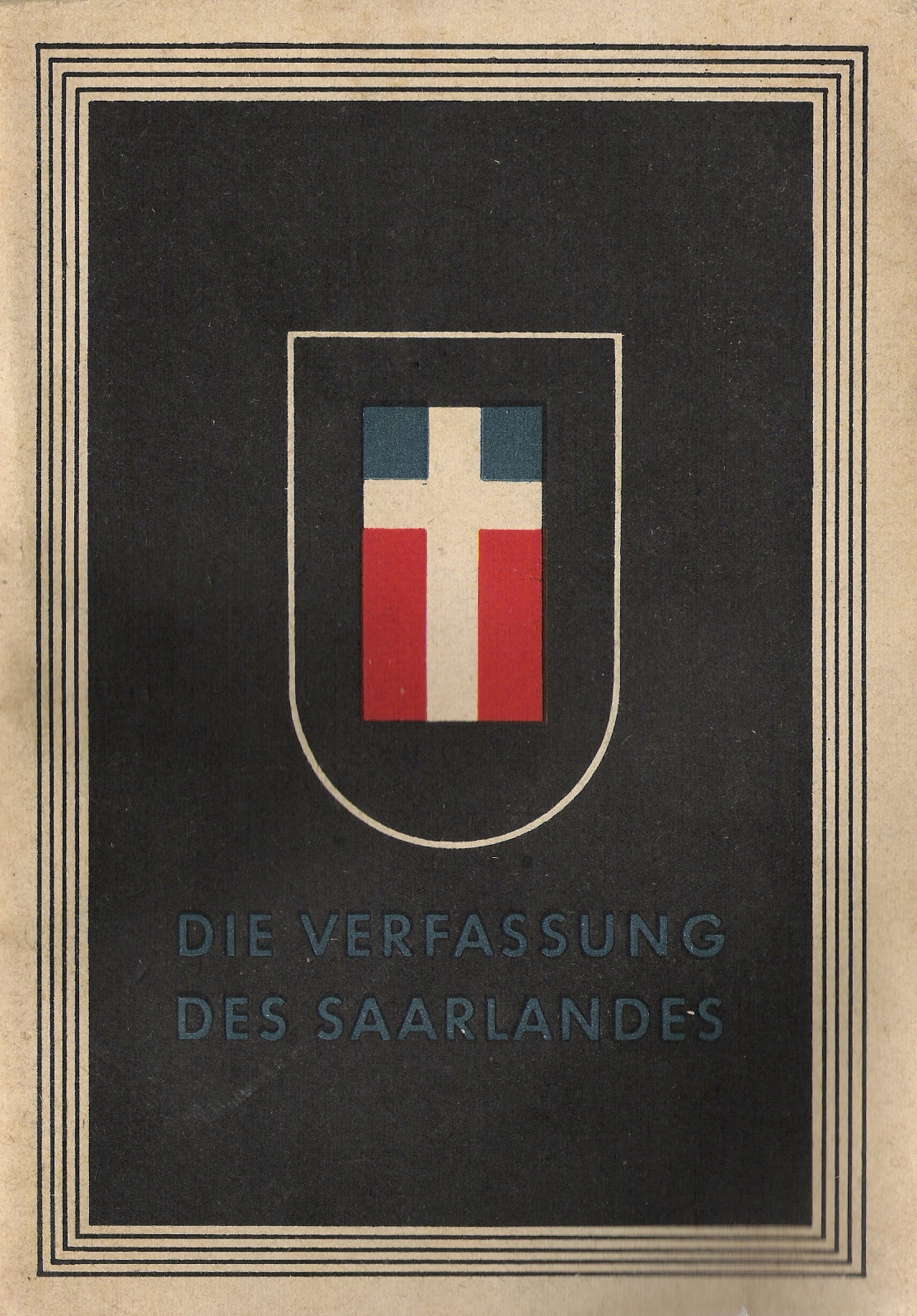
Constitution of Saarland 1947/48

On 16 July 1947 the Saar mark replaced the Reichsmark as legal tender in the Saar Protectorate, followed by the integration of the Saar into the French currency area on 15 November the same year. While only French franc banknotes circulated from 1954 on, Saar franc coins, designed similar to French coins, were issued too. On 15 December 1947 the Saar was constituted by its constitution as the Saarland (took effect two days later), with an elected government under the control of the French high commissioner Gilbert Grandval. December 1947 had severe flooding along the Saar river, water higher than in the past 150 years, with extensive relief efforts undertaken. On 23 March 1948 the customs union with France was confirmed, taking effect on 1 April.

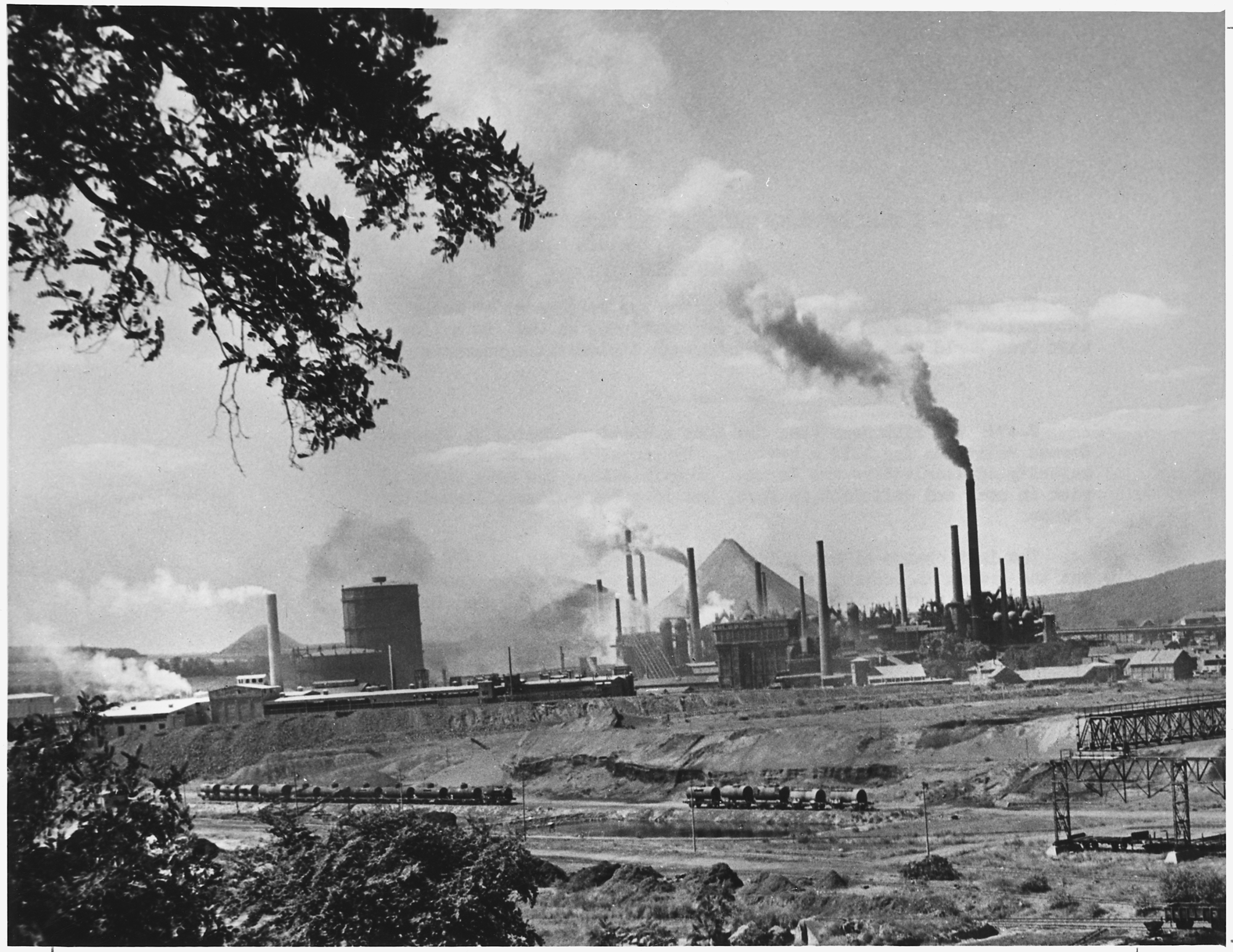
View of steel and ironworks in the Saar, c.1950

Initially, a policy of industrial disarmament was pursued in Germany by the Allied powers (see industrial plans for Germany). As part of this policy, limits were placed on permitted production levels, and industries in the Saar were dismantled as they had been in the Ruhr, although mostly in the period before the detachment. This policy was reversed in mid-1946 or early 1947.

France's attempts to internationalize the Ruhr (see International Authority for the Ruhr) were abandoned in 1950 when, in the face of Cold War pressures in Europe, the French government took a historic step in deciding that the only viable political model for the future lay in European integration. This resulted in the Schuman Declaration, a plan drafted for the most part by Jean Monnet. The plan put forward a rapprochement between France, Germany, and other European countries wanting to participate. As a first step, France and Germany were to agree to pool their markets for coal and steel, following the establishment of the European Coal and Steel Community (ECSC). With the participation of West Germany in the ECSC, agreement on termination of the International Authority for the Ruhr came into force on 25 June 1952. However, France delayed the return of the Saar.

Under French rule, pro-German parties were initially banned from contesting the elections. Much support was given to the Mouvement pour le rattachement de la Sarre à la France, a Francophile movement founded by Saar exiles in Paris in early 1945, with many of the exiles having returned after the war. However, in the general election of December 1952, 24% of the voters cast blank ballots in support of banned pro-German parties (while the majority still voted for one of the legal parties who wanted the Saar to remain autonomous).

=== Referendum and becoming a state of West Germany ===
In the Paris Agreements of 23 October 1954, France offered to establish an independent "Saarland", under the auspices of the Western European Union (WEU), but a referendum held on 23 October 1955 rejected this plan by 67.7% to 32.3% (out of a 96.5% turnout: 423,434 against, 201,975 for) despite the public support of West German Chancellor Konrad Adenauer for the plan. The rejection of the plan by the Sarrois was interpreted as support for the Saar to join the Federal Republic of Germany.

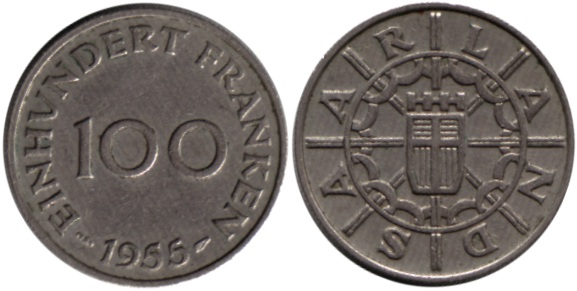
100 Saar franken coin

On 27 October 1956 the Saar Treaty established that Saarland should be allowed to become a state of West Germany, as provided by article 23 of its Grundgesetz (constitution), and so Saarland did on 1 January 1957. West Germany agreed to the channelization of the Moselle, which reduced freight costs for the French steel industry in Lorraine. West Germany also agreed to the teaching of French as the first foreign language in schools in the Saarland; although no longer binding, the agreement is still generally followed.

The treaty also stated that economic union with West Germany was to be completed by 1960, with the exact date of the replacement of the Saar and French franc by the Deutsche Mark being kept a secret called "Day X" (Tag X). Although the Saar became a state of West Germany (as Saarland) on 1 January 1957, the franc remained legal tender in Saarland until 6 July 1959. Thus on that date the Kleine Wiedervereinigung (little reunification) was completed, after more than 13 years of separation.

As a footnote to the creation of the European Union, the territorial dispute over control of the Saarland was one of the last between member states and led to the European flag being given a politically neutral ring of twelve stars rather than the originally proposed 15 (one of which was to represent a nominally independent Saar as a member of the Council of Europe).

== Ministers-President ==
The first elections for the parliament of the Saar protectorate were held on 5 October 1947, with four parties being allowed, the Christian People's Party of Saarland (CVP), the Social Democratic Party of Saarland (SPS), the Democratic Party of Saarland (DPS) and the Communist Party of Saarland (KPS). The first Landtag passed the law establishing the constitution of the Saarland on 15 December 1947. The most successful party, the CVP under Johannes Hoffmann formed the first government with the SPS.

- 1947–1952: Johannes Hoffmann (CVP), first term
- 1952–1955: Johannes Hoffmann (CVP), second term, resigned after the Saar statute failed in the referendum
- 1955–1956: Heinrich Welsch (independent), led the government till the end of his term
- 1956–1957: Hubert Ney (CVP), resigned after the reunification due to party quarrels

== French representatives ==
Saar Protectorate (dark green) and France (light green) in 1956

High Commissioner of the French Republic in the Saarland

- Gilbert-Yves-Edmond Grandval: 10 January 1948 – 5 March 1952

Chiefs of the diplomatic mission of the French Republic in the Saarland

- Gilbert-Yves-Edmond Grandval: 1 January 1952 – 8 July 1955
- Charles-Marie-Eric de Carbonnel: 8 July 1955 – 27 October 1956

== Sport ==
The Saar competed in the 1952 Summer Olympics in Helsinki, and the Saarland national football team participated in the qualifying section of the 1954 FIFA World Cup, but failed to qualify after coming second to the West German team, but ahead of Norway. Helmut Schön, later World and European champion with West Germany, was the manager of the Saarland team from 1952 until Saarland became a part of West Germany in 1957.

The Amateurliga Saarland was the local league within the German Football League System except 1948–1951 period when it was under independent Saarland Football Association control. 1. FC Saarbrücken took part in the first ever European Cup in 1955.

== Postage stamps ==
Postage stamps were issued specially for the territory from 1920 to 1935, and from 1947 to 1959 (see postage stamps and postal history of the Saar).

== See also ==
- Sarre, a department of France (1798–1814)
- Saar (river)
- Kehl, a town directly annexed to France in 1945 and returned to Germany in 1953
- List of French possessions and colonies
- Dutch annexation of German territory after the Second World War
- Belgian annexation plans after the Second World War
- Luxembourg annexation plans after the Second World War
- Recovered Territories
- Free Territory of Trieste
