= Johannes Hoffmann (CVP politician) =

German politician (1890–1967)

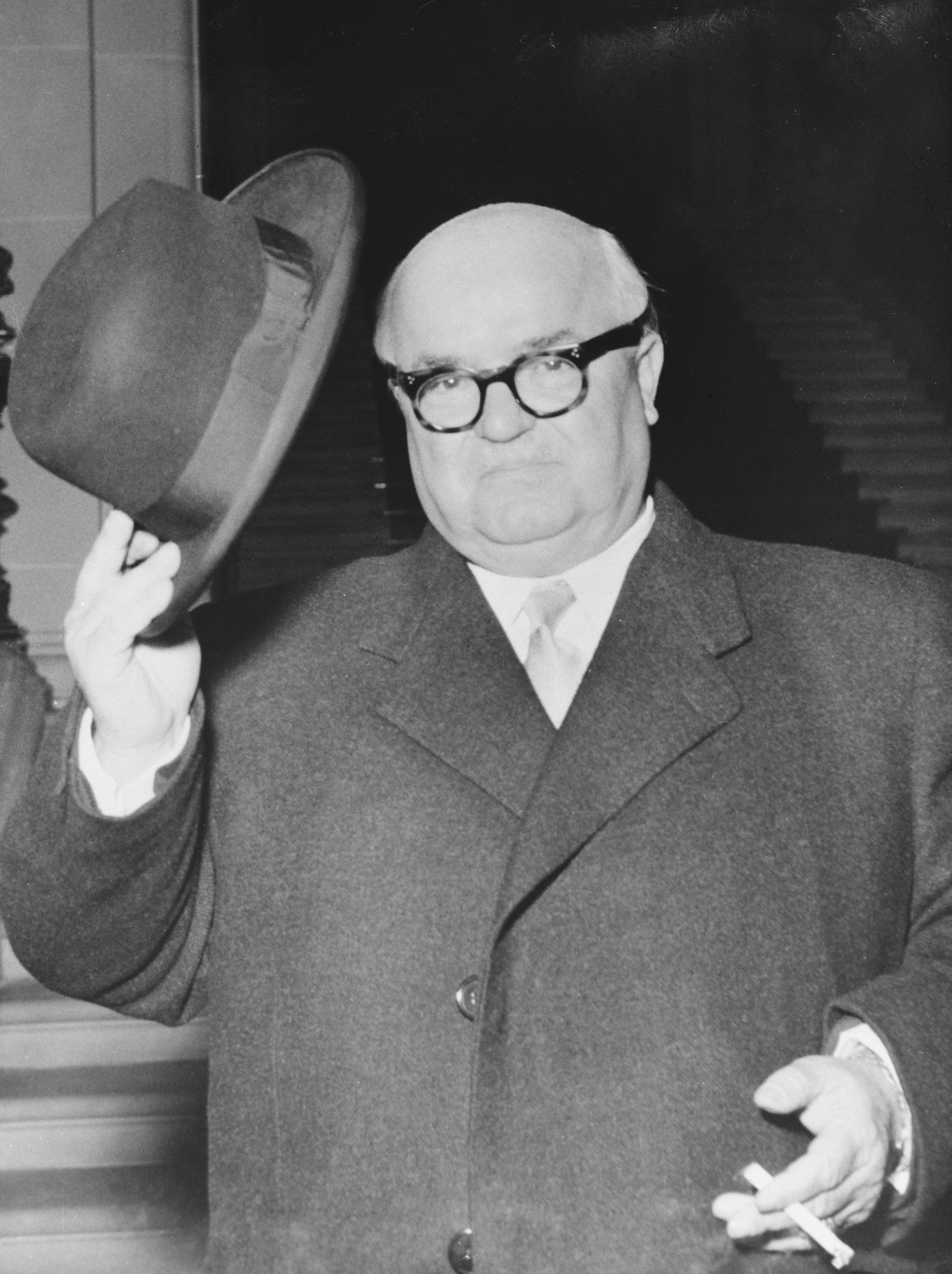
- Hoffmann in 1955

Minister President of the Saarland (Saar Protectorate)
- In office 20 December 1947 – 29 October 1955
- Preceded by: position established
- Succeeded by: Heinrich Welsch

Personal details
- Born: Johann Victor; 23 December 1890 Landsweiler-Reden, German Empire
- Died: 21 September 1967 (aged 76) Völklingen, Saarland, West Germany
- Party: Christian People's Party of Saarland (CVP)
- Spouse: Frieda Krause (m. 1919)
- Children: 6
- Education: University of Freiburg

Johann Viktor (23 December 1890 – 21 September 1967), known professionally as Johannes "Joho" Hoffmann, was a German politician. A founding member and chairman of the Christian People's Party of Saarland (Christliche Volkspartei or CVP), Hoffman served as Minister-President of the French Saar Protectorate from 1947 to 1955.

== Biography ==
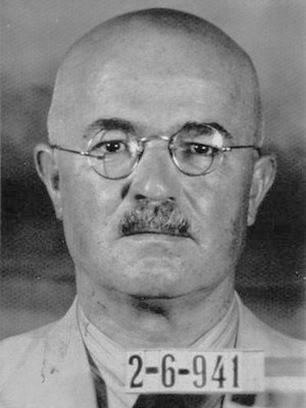
Hoffmann in 1941

Hoffmann was born in 1890 in Landsweiler-Reden. He came from a humble background. After graduation, he studied theology in Trier with the aim of becoming a priest.

Soon, however, he changed his mind, moved to the Albert-Ludwigs-Universität Freiburg, and studied journalism. After the start of World War I he volunteered, fought in Ottoman Empire among others, and was awarded the Iron Crescent.

After the First World War, Johannes Hoffmann worked as a journalist at the central organ of the German Center Party in Berlin.

On 1 October 1929 he became chief editor of the Saarbrücker Landeszeitung, the largest Catholic newspaper in the Saar.

After the rise of Hitler, he took a stand against the Nazis in the Saar press, which was at this time still free.

In 1934 he was therefore dismissed as editor-in-chief in an act of anticipatory obedience. He then founded the New Saar Post and struggled in his articles against the National Socialist regime and against the connection of the Saarland into the German Reich.

After the Saar status referendum on 13 January 1935, he emigrated first to France, then to Luxembourg. In 1936 his German citizenship was revoked. The Luxembourg government refused him admission as a journalist, so he was only able to publish a few articles in the Luxemburger Wort.

To feed his family, he leased a farm. He was active in the Popular Front movement Lutetia Circle. In 1939 he received a position at the German-language program of French radio in Paris. In his broadcasts, he reported on crimes committed by the Nazi regime.

In 1940, at the beginning of the Western campaign, he was interned by the French in Audierne, in the Finistère department (Brittany). After the Fall of France, Hoffmann fled to the unoccupied zone. By 1941, he was hiding in a monastery in Provence.

In 1941, using a fake passport, he managed to escape to Portugal via Spain. He traveled from Portugal to Brazil. In Rio de Janeiro, he was welcomed into the home of the Canadian ambassador. He was co-founder and head of the Free-Germany Movement in Brazil.

== Postwar career ==
Hoffmann returned to the Saarland in 1945, was a founding member of the Christian People's Party of Saarland and was its chairman. He was elected almost unanimously due to his personal integrity. At the same time, he became editor of the Saarland Volkszeitung (organ of the CVP) and co-editor of new Saarbrücker Zeitung.

In 1947, he was President of the Constitutional Commission and of the Legislative Assembly of the Saarland, which adopted the Constitution of Saarland. From 1947 to 1955, he was Prime Minister of Saarland.

In 1950, he reached an end of the French occupation regulations for Saarland. Due to its policy, the Saarland was from 1953 a de facto independent state.

His aim was "to find a solution for the Saar that would contribute to the relaxation of Franco-German relations and to promote the necessary European unity" (Hoffmann).

He pursued a separatist policy, aiming to separate the Saarland from Germany not only economically, but also politically. After the 1955 referendum vote, wherein the majority of the population rejected the Saar statute negotiated between Germany and France and therefore the Europeanisation of the Saar, he stepped down as Prime Minister.

One of the slogans directed against him before the vote by the home parties was: "The fat man must go." Hoffmann and the CVP policy were characterized by a close economic and political tie to France, coupled with an active social policy and authoritarian domestic politics.

In 1956 he retired permanently from politics. In 1963 he published the book Das Ziel war Europa (The Goal was Europe), in which he outlined his policy goals and gave an account of his tenure. Hoffmann died in Völklingen in 1967 and was buried in the New World Cemetery in Saarlouis — his grave is located right next to his opponent and future successor Hubert Ney.
