= Saar status referendum =

Saar status referendum may refer to

- 1935 Saar status referendum
- 1955 Saar Statute referendum
