= Friedrich von Bömches =

German artist

Friedrich Ritter Bömches von Boor (27 December 1916 – 2 May 2010) was a German painter, graphic artist and photographer.

== Life ==
The son of an old-established Transylvanian Saxon family, Friedrich von Bömches was born in Braşov at a time when Transylvania was still part of Austria-Hungary. In 1938, he was drafted in the Romanian Army, and marched with it up to Stalingrad. Von Bömches was demobbed in 1945, but as a German he was deported to the Soviet Union by occupying forces shortly after, and was forced to work in Ukrainian quarries until 1950.

In 1974 von Bömches relocated to the Federal Republic of Germany and four years later finally found - with the assistance of a local factory owner - a new home at Wiehl, a small town in North Rhine-Westphalia. Here, the artist lives together with his wife Erna (married since 1945) and still responds to his unbowed creative urge, though evidently limited by a severe heart surgery performed in 2001.

== Work ==
Friedrich von Bömches has been highly successful in sublimating his bitter experiences with war and captivity. He took up this artistic transformation using the medium of photography: during the Stalingrad campaign von Bömches created a lot of photographs (most of which have additional documentary value).

Not allowed to engage in this art throughout his captivity, von Bömches compensated by resorting to drawing. To date, von Bömches has produced again and again his famous Sekundenskizzen ("instant sketches") - he admitted to be suffering from a "hysterical pencil addiction". Nonetheless, a large portion of his post-release works deal with the tragedy of human existence, death (including his heralds that age and decay), hunger und persecution - to some extent in biblical or mythological moods. In "trapping" the living through the contemplation of such seeming opposites as Life and Death, he provides equal motifs: masterly portraits thanks to an outstanding power of observation, as well as many "little" pictures, most of them extempore, with animal and other themes.

The German connoisseur and patron of arts Peter Ludwig (1925–1996) referred to von Bömches as the "probably greatest portraitist of the present".

Between 1950 and 1974, he created some fifteen thousand works. None of them were taken out of Romania. The number of his creations in Germany probably reaches a similar number, including his portraits of notable persons (more than five hundred in number).

=== Paintings and drawings (selection of the late work) ===
- Tell Me where the Flowers Are (Sag mir, wo die Blumen sind), acrylic, 1990
- The Ferryman (Der Fährmann), mid-1990s
- The Embarrassing Guest (Der unangenehme Gast), mid-1990s
- Terminus (Endstation), mid-1990s
- There Is No Way Back (Es gibt kein Zurück), mid-1990s
- The Endless Way (Der unendliche Weg), mid-1990s
- Pietà, mid-1990s
- Crucifixion (Kreuzigung), mid-1990s
- Funeral Cortege in Romania (Trauerzug in Rumänien), mid-1990s
- People Left Behind (Die Zurückgelassenen), charcoal, 1994
- Nursing Home (Altenheim), 1995
- Behind Barbwire (Hinter Stacheldraht), mixed media, 1999
- Trip in the Dark (Fahrt ins Ungewisse) (Trilogy: Day / Night / The Door Opens), mixed media, 2001

=== Notabilities' portraits (selection) ===
- Berthold Beitz, chairman of the supervisory board at Krupp
- Hans-Dietrich Genscher
- Martin Heidegger
- Philipp Jenninger, speaker of the Federal Diet of Germany (1984–88)
- Lore Lorentz (1920–1994), Grande Dame of German cabaret
- Peter Ludwig (1925–1996), German connoisseur and patron of arts
- Hermann Oberth
- Herbert Quandt
- Horst Waffenschmidt (1933–2002), German politician

== Exhibitions in Germany (selection) ==
- 1966 / 1974: Aachen, Suermondt-Ludwig-Museum
- 1985: Bonn - Bad Godesberg (Muffendorf), Altes Kelterhaus
- 1998: Burzenland - Artist's Land, Dinkelsbühl, parish house St. Paul
- 2001: Hommage à Friedrich von Bömches, Wiehl, lobby of savings bank
- 2002: The Way to Stalingrad (photographies), Berlin, Romanian Institute of Culture / Banishment, Nümbrecht, Homburg castle
- 2005: Pictures from the Gulag, Ulm, Donauschwäbisches Zentralmuseum / Lost Years, Stolberg-Vicht, Europäischer Kunsthof
- 2007: Gundelsheim, Baden-Württemberg, Transylvanian Museum at Horneck Castle
- Durable exhibition at Gummersbach, Kreishaus

== Tributes ==
Friedrich von Bömches received several awards for his life's work:

- In Romania (Merit Cultural)
- In Ohio, United States
- In Germany (1987: Federal Cross of Merit, 2002: Schwarzenberger Hochzeitstaler in Gold )

== Literature ==
- Friedrich von Bömches: Malerei und Grafik, 1992, ISBN 3-88265-168-7
- Friedrich von Bömches: Leben und Schicksal, 1996, ISBN 3-88265-199-7
- Veröffentlichungen des Südostdeutschen Kulturwerks: Reihe A, Kultur und Dichtung; Bd. 52, 1997, ISBN 3-88356-121-5

== See also ==
- List of German painters
