= Flag of Saarland =

Saarland
- Use: Civil and state flag
- Proportion: 3:5
- Adopted: 1957
- Design: A horizontal tricolour of black, red, and gold, defaced by the coat of arms of Saarland.
- Use: Standard of Minister-President of the Saarland

The flag of Saarland is based on the flag of Germany and is a black, red, and gold horizontal tricolor. In the center of the flag is the coat of arms of Saarland. The flag of Saarland is both the civil flag (Landesflagge), as well as the state service flag (Landesdienstflagge).

== History ==
=== Territory of the Saar Basin ===
Flag of the Territory of the Saar Basin (1920–1935)

The Saar region was formed by the Treaty of Versailles, which ended World War I. It was decided that the area belonged to Germany, but would be administered by France on behalf of the League of Nations. On 28 July 1920, it was decided that the area would use a blue, white, and black horizontal tricolour flag. These are both the colors of the two former states of Prussia (black-white) and Bavaria (white-blue), from parts of whose territories the Saar region was formed, as well as the basic colors of the individual heraldic fields of the coat of arms of the Saar region. This was used until 1 March 1935, when the area again came under German administration. In 1935, when Germany once again assumed control of the Saarland, it is assumed no new flag was created since the Saarland was absorbed into the area known as Westmark.

=== Saar Protectorate ===
Flag of the Saar Protectorate (1947–1956)

At the conclusion of World War II, the French assumed control of the Saar as a protectorate. The flag used at this time was a design with a Scandinavian cross. Left of the vertical bar of the cross was blue, and to the right was red. The colors are derived from the colors of the French flag.

=== Saarland ===
When the Saar Protectorate rejoined the Federal Republic of Germany in 1957, it adopted its current flag. This is based on the flag of Germany, defaced by the coat of arms of Saarland. The four quarters of the shield of the state coat of arms represent the historic areas of Nassau-Saarbrücken, Archbishopric and Electorate of Trier, Duchy of Lorraine, and Palatinate-Zweibrücken.

== See also ==
- Flags of German states
