= Kunstforum Baden-Badener Versicherung =

Kunstforum Baden-Badener Versicherung was an art museum in Saarland, Germany from 1992 to 2016.
