= Grube Düppenweiler =

Coordinates: 49°24′46″N 6°46′59″E

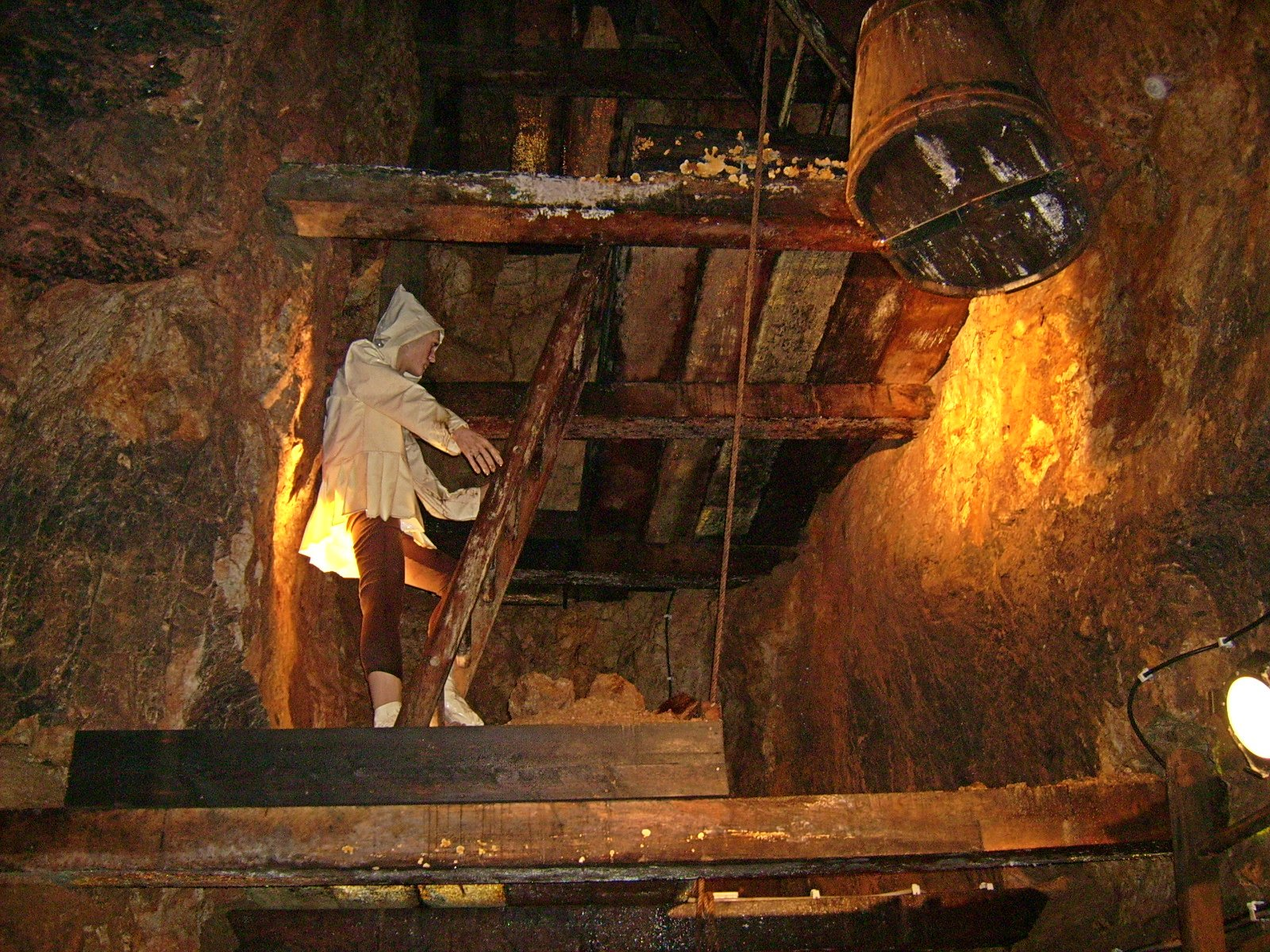

Grube Düppenweiler is a museum in Saarland, Germany.
