= Peter Ludwig =

German industrialist, art collector and patron (1925–1996)

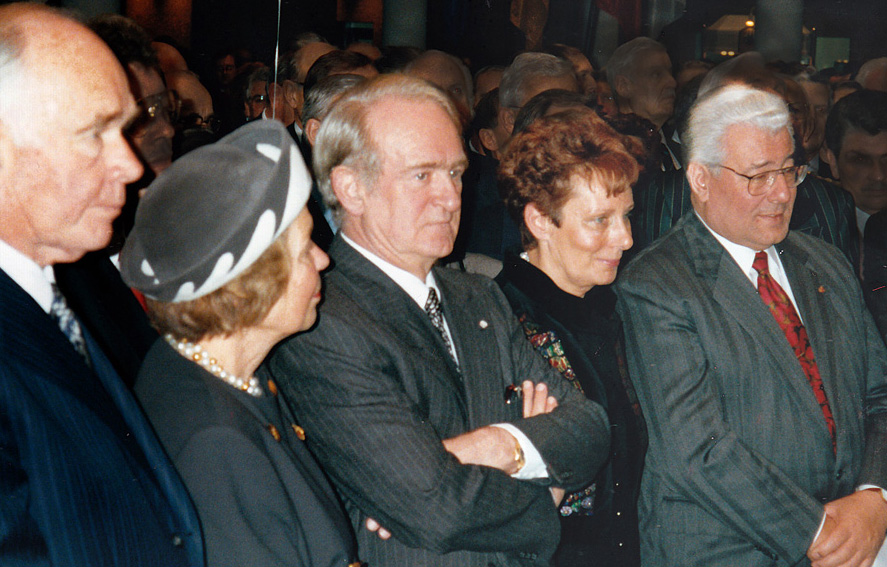
Peter and Irene Ludwig (left) with Johannes Rau, Minister-President of North Rhine-Westphalia, and Cologne Lord Mayor Norbert Burger and his wife Annemarie Burger

Peter Ludwig (9 July 1925, Koblenz – 22 July 1996, Aachen) was a German art patron, art collector and entrepreneur.

== Life ==
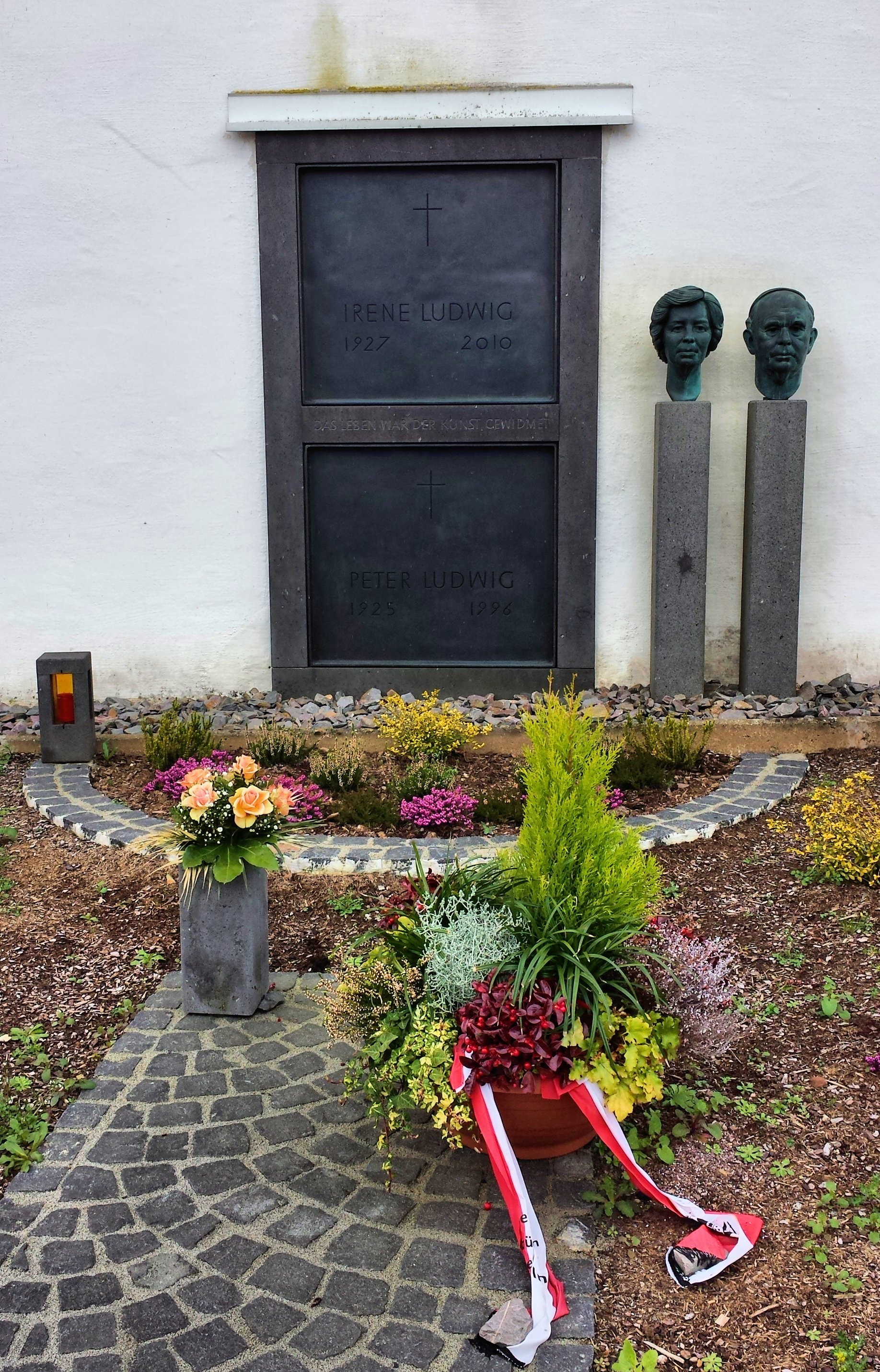
Grave of Irene and Peter Ludwig in Sankt Aldegund (2020)

The son of a lawyer and a daughter of the Klöckner industrial family, Ludwig attended the then-named Kaiserin-Augusta-Gymnasium (today the Görres-Gymnasium, Koblenz) in Koblenz and completed his wartime Abitur in 1943. After military service and American captivity, he studied art history, archaeology, history and philosophy from 1946 at the Johannes Gutenberg University Mainz. He was awarded his doctorate there under Friedrich Gerke with a dissertation entitled Das Menschenbild Picassos als Ausdruck eines generationsbedingten Lebensgefühls (Picasso's Image of Humanity as an Expression of a Generational Outlook).

One of the first museum figures with whom Ludwig collaborated was Hermann Schnitzler, director of the Schnütgen Museum, who had also opened the young student's eyes to Picasso.

In 1951, Peter Ludwig married Irene Monheim, with whom he shared a passion for art. He joined the firm Leonard Monheim and developed the company — later renamed Ludwig Schokolade — into one of Germany's leading chocolate businesses during the 1970s and 1980s.

Peter Ludwig died on 22 July 1996 following postoperative complications — a heart attack — after a fulminant appendicitis.

== Museum foundations and foundation ==
Ludwig joined the Club Aachener Casino as early as 1952 and by 1957 became chairman of the Aachen Museum Society, beginning his collaboration with museums in Cologne and Aachen. This was followed by involvement in various other museum societies, donations to and foundations of museums and other institutions:

- 1970: Neue Galerie – Sammlung Ludwig, Aachen
- 1976: Museum Ludwig, Cologne
- 1977: Suermondt-Ludwig-Museum, Aachen
- 1981: Museum Moderner Kunst Stiftung Ludwig Wien, Vienna
- 1981: Antikenmuseum Basel und Sammlung Ludwig, Basel
- 1983: Ludwig Galerie Schloss Oberhausen, Oberhausen
- 1989: Haus Ludwig, Saarlouis
- 1989: Ludwig Museum Budapest, Budapest
- 1991: Ludwig Forum für Internationale Kunst, Aachen
- 1992: Ludwig Museum Koblenz, Koblenz
- 1994: Fundación Ludwig de Cuba, Havana
- 1994: Sammlung Ludwig Bamberg, Bamberg
- 1995: Ludwig Museum in the Russian Museum, Saint Petersburg
- 1996: Ludwig Museum for International Art, Beijing

Peter Ludwig's art collections are today distributed across nineteen museums in five countries. His widow Irene established the Peter und Irene Ludwig Stiftung (Peter and Irene Ludwig Foundation), which emerged from the Ludwig Stiftung für Kunst und internationale Verständigung GmbH.

== Portraits of Peter Ludwig ==
The Ludwig Forum holds a screenprint portrait of Ludwig by Andy Warhol, dated 1980, measuring 100 × 100 cm.

In 1986, sculptor Arno Breker began a portrait of Ludwig, who visited his studio regularly over several months to sit for the bust. Two versions were produced: a life-size cast and a monumental, larger-than-life bronze. Ludwig drew fierce public criticism for commissioning Breker, a central figure of National Socialist cultural policy who had, among other projects, created sculptural decoration in Berlin in collaboration with Albert Speer. Despite the controversy, Ludwig stood by Breker without reservation, and Breker subsequently produced two further busts of Ludwig's wife Irene.

Bernhard Heisig also painted an oil portrait of Ludwig, dated 1993, 120 × 150 cm.
