= Saar Treaty =

1956 treaty between West Germany and France

- Type: Bilateral treaty
- Signed: 27 October 1956
- Location: Luxembourg City, Luxembourg
- Original signatories: French Fourth Republic; West Germany
- Ratifiers: French Fourth Republic; West Germany

The Saar Treaty, or Treaty of Luxembourg (German: Vertrag von Luxemburg, French: accords de Luxembourg) is an agreement between West Germany and France concerning the return of the Saar Protectorate to West Germany. The treaty was signed in Luxembourg on 27 October 1956, by foreign ministers Heinrich von Brentano of West Germany and Christian Pineau of France, following the Saar Statute referendum on 23 October 1955, which resulted in a majority vote against the Saar Statute.

After the Landtag declared its accession to the Federal Republic of Germany (West Germany), the incorporation of the Saarland was finalised on 1 January 1957. Both involved parties agreed on an economic transition period through 1959, during which the Saarland remained under French control.
