= Feinmechanisches Museum Fellenbergmühle =

Museum of machines in manufacturing engineering

Coordinates: 49°26′44″N 6°38′36″E

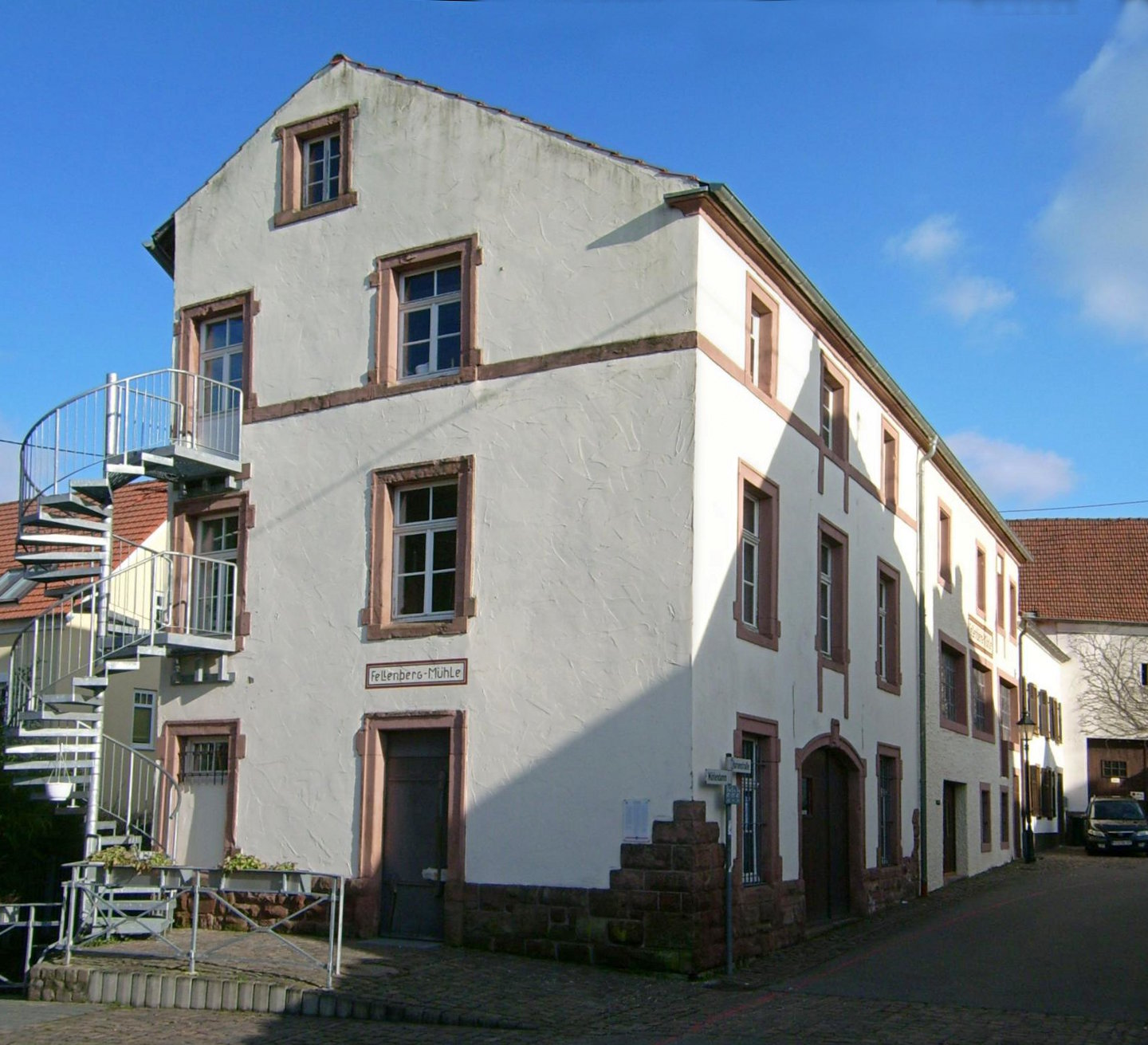

The Fellenbergmühle Museum of Precision Mechanics (German: Feinmechanisches Museum Fellenbergmühle) is a museum in Saarland, Germany. It displays mainly machines used for separation in manufacturing engineering. The museum's most notable feature is that the factory upon which it was built was preserved at the time of its discontinuation. As a snapshot of industrial history, this exhibition separates itself from the typically-used chronological concept. Since the 1997 restoration, visitors can authentically retrace the factory's machines, from their power supply to their performance.

== History ==
The precision mechanics factory was founded in Merzig in 1927 by Johann Peter Hartfuß. He established the factory in a mill, which was previously used for the milling of cereals and oil. The original mill was built in 1767 by Romanus Siegele and Mathias Gusenburger on the Seffersbach River. The fast-flowing brook drove up to 32 mills. The factory manufactured machines and tools for watchmakers. The water power was initially harnessed by use of a water wheel. The efficiency was increased in 1929 via the installation of a Francis turbine. In addition to the production machines, it could also drive a dynamo by means of a line shaft. One of the most successful inventions of the factory was the Cardan wedding ring engraving machine, developed and patented in 1931, with which wedding rings could be inscribed by the use of stencils. This machine can even today engrave the desired initials in a matter of minutes.

The clockwork, designed in 1925 by Johann Peter Hartfuß, the founder of the factory in Merzig, turned the "Saarlanduhr", a clock in the Merziger Stadtpark, also called the "tomato clock", "fruit clock" or "flower clock". The design of the clock face involved apples, pears, tomatoes, beans, peas, carrots and grapes.

== Other uses ==
In the entrance of the protected building, which was awarded the Saarland Monument Prize in 1997, is a bistro. The attic is used for temporary exhibitions, but is also available for weddings.
