= Saarländisches Zweiradmuseum =

Museum in Germany

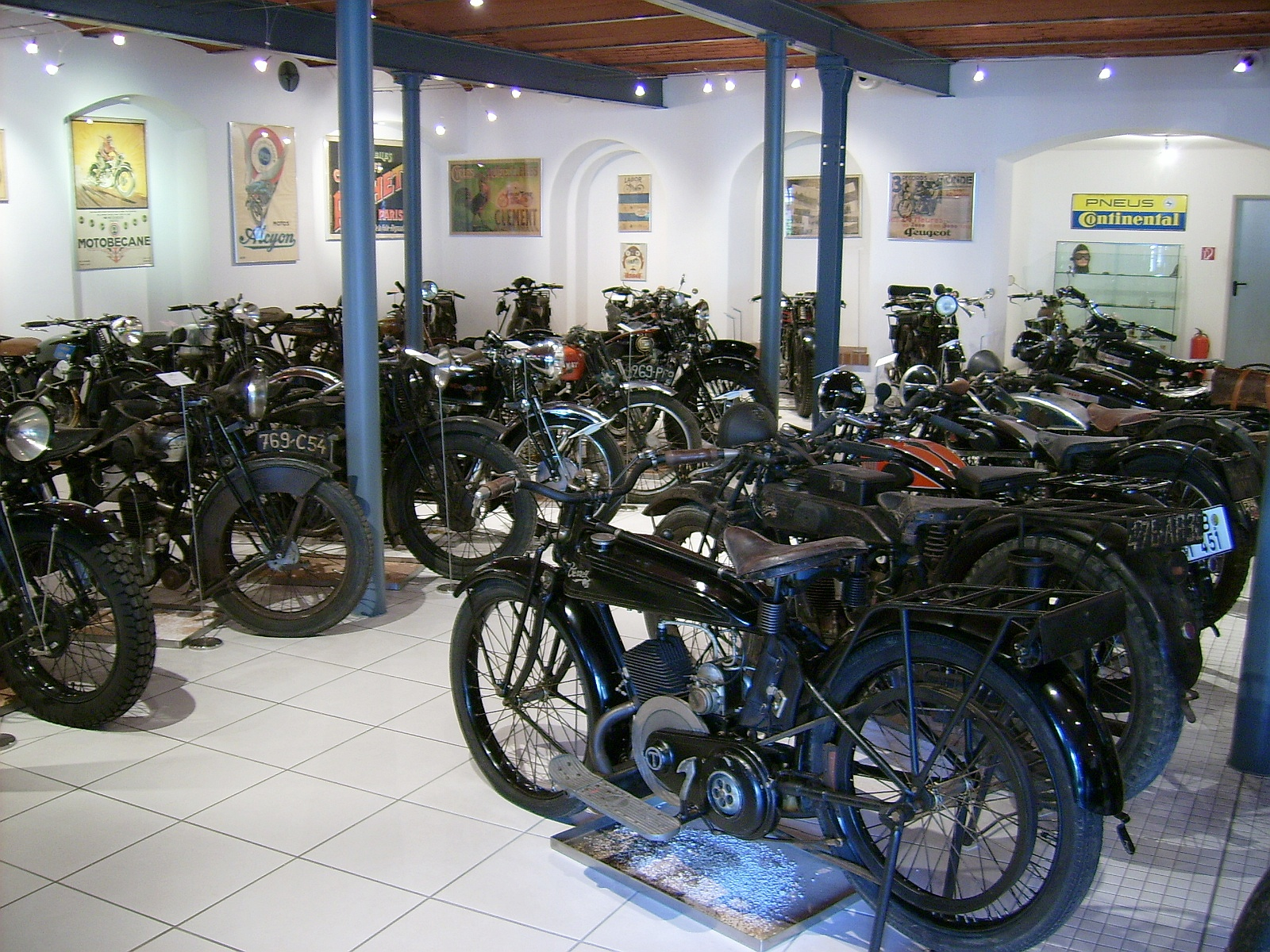

Saarländisches Zweiradmuseum is a motorcycle museum in Saarland, Germany.

The owners of the site of the museum, Villeroy & Boch closed the museum on September 30, 2007. They planned to build a factory outlet center on the premises. The museum announced that they would seek a new location, probably at the Völklingen Ironworks. The museum was temporarily moved to an old cinema in Voelkingen, but the ironworks location could not be accepted due to the 2 million Euro cost of renovation.
