= Saarlandlied =

National anthem of the Saar Protectorate from 1947 to 1957

The Saarlandlied ("The Saarland Tune") was the national anthem of the Saar Protectorate from 1947 to 1957 and the state anthem of Saarland after 1957. After World War II, the Saarland was an autonomous state and economically attached to France. On the occasion of the first game of the Saarland national football team in 1950 against Switzerland, a separate national anthem was therefore necessary. They chose the song "I know where a lovely, friendly valley is", also known as the Saarlandlied.

== Lyrics ==
German

Ich rühm’ dich, du freundliches Land an der Saar,
von friedlichen Grenzen umgeben.
Nie wieder bedrohe dich Krieg und Gefahr,
in dir möcht’ ich immerzu leben.
Und gibst du uns Arbeit, so hat’s keine Not,
wir werden die Mühen nicht scheuen,
und Feste auch feiern zum täglichen Brot,
denn du, unser Land, sollst uns freuen.

Translation:
English

I praise you, you friendly country on the Saar,
surrounded by peaceful borders.
Never again will war and danger threaten you,
I would like to live in you forever.
And if you give us work, there will be no need,
we will not shy away from the effort,
and also celebrate festivals for daily bread,
for you, our land, shall make us happy.
