= Saar statute =

1954 territorial settlement between France and West Germany

Saar Statute
- Type: Bilateral treaty
- Signed: 27 October 1956
- Location: Paris, France
- Original signatories: France; West Germany
- Ratifiers: France; West Germany

The Saar Statute was a Franco-West German agreement signed in 1954 which resulted from lengthy diplomatic negotiations between France and West Germany. It helped to pave the way for a more modern Europe following post World War II tensions and geo-political disputes. The incorporation of the Saarland was finalized on 1 January 1957.

== Background ==
In 1947 the Saar protectorate was separated from the French occupied zone in Germany and entered into a customs, economic and monetary union with France. The Saar Regional Government did enjoy political autonomy but remained under the authority of the High Commissioner, Gilbert Grandval, who represented the French Government. A real economic frontier between the Saar and the rest of Germany therefore existed. The Americans and the British were quick to block France from integrating with the Saar more closely.

The German Government called openly for an end to the special status granted to the Saar and for its reunification with the remainder of the Federal Republic of Germany (FRG). Chancellor Konrad Adenauer made use of the platform provided by the Council of Europe to try to bring pressure to bear on France on the issue of making the Saar once more part of Germany. Because of its own political, economic and military interests, France refused to consider these requests but finally signed the Treaty establishing the European Coal and Steel Community (ECSC) on behalf of the Saarbrücken Government. The Landtag of the Saar appointed its own representatives to the Common Assembly and controversy continued even though compromises had been reached.

== Towards a Statute ==
In 1953, the Council of Europe resumed talks aimed at finding a solution to the Saar question and in the Assembly, the Dutch delegate, Marinus van der Goes van Naters, proposed that the Saar be given the status of a European territory. Increasing international pressure forced France to compromise and on 23 October 1954, the Federal Republic of Germany (FRG) and France signed the Paris Agreements which ended the occupation of West Germany and set out the terms for resolving the Saar issue. It was agreed that the region would be given the status of a European territory within the enlarged framework of Western European Union (WEU). However, the agreement still had to be ratified by the inhabitants of the Saar, who were still not content with the French presence.

== Signing ==
In the Saar Statute referendum of 23 October 1955, 67.7% of the electorate in the Saar rejected the European territory status proposed in the Paris Agreements. France was therefore forced to accept the return of the Saar to Germany. On 27 October 1956, the Luxembourg Agreements, signed by France and the Federal Republic, provided for the political reintegration of the Saar into West Germany on 1 January 1957. The signing of this Agreement finally put an end to a territorial dispute in Franco-West German relations, and it served to further facilitate negotiations regarding the canalisation of the Moselle River from France, through Luxembourg to West Germany.
