= Haus Ludwig =

Coordinates: 49°18′49″N 6°44′56″E

Haus Ludwig, formerly Galerie Ludwig, is an art museum in Saarland, Germany.

== History ==
On May 30, 1989, the Galerie Ludwig was opened in a former bank in East Germany. Initially, only works by artists from the former GDR were shown. In 1990 the museum was renamed the Museum Haus Ludwig for art exhibitions in Saarlouis. Since then, regional, national and international artists have been presented in temporary exhibitions. On the second floor of the building there is a studio that is available to various groups and groups of the Saarland art scene as a meeting place as well as to individual regional artists for their exhibitions. There is a cooperation with the Ludwig Galerie Schloss Oberhausen, which came about through the local chocolate factory of the collector Peter Ludwig and his wife Irene Ludwig. In 2017, the museum at the old location was closed and the Ludwig Gallery was set up in the former barracks VI opposite.

== Exhibitions ==
The Ludwig Galerie has three kinds of exhibitions:

- important works from the collection of Irene and Peter Ludwig
- exhibitions by regional artists
- collaborations with other museums and private collectors

== Literature ==
- Sammlung Ludwig in Museen der Welt. [Katalogbuch z. Ausstell. im Museum Haus Ludwig Saarlouis]. Hrsg.: Bernhard Mensch. Oberhausen: Ludwig Galerie, 1996. 48 S., zahlr. Ill. ISBN 3-932236-00-9
- Zehn Jahre Kunst der Welt in Saarlouis. [Festschrift z. 10jährigen Bestehen des Museum Haus Ludwig Saarlouis]. Hrsg.: Bernhard Mensch. Oberhausen: Ludwig Galerie, 1999.
- Subjektive Fotografie – Otto Steinerts Schüler in Saarbrücken 1948 - 1959. [Katalog zu Ausstell. i. Museum Haus Ludwig für Kunstausstellungen Saarlouis; Ludwig Galerie Schloss Oberhausen u. Sammlung Ann und Jürgen Wilde, Zülpich]. Hrsg.: Bernhard Mensch. Oberhausen: Ludwig Galerie, 2002. 110 S., zahlr. Ill.

== Bibliography ==
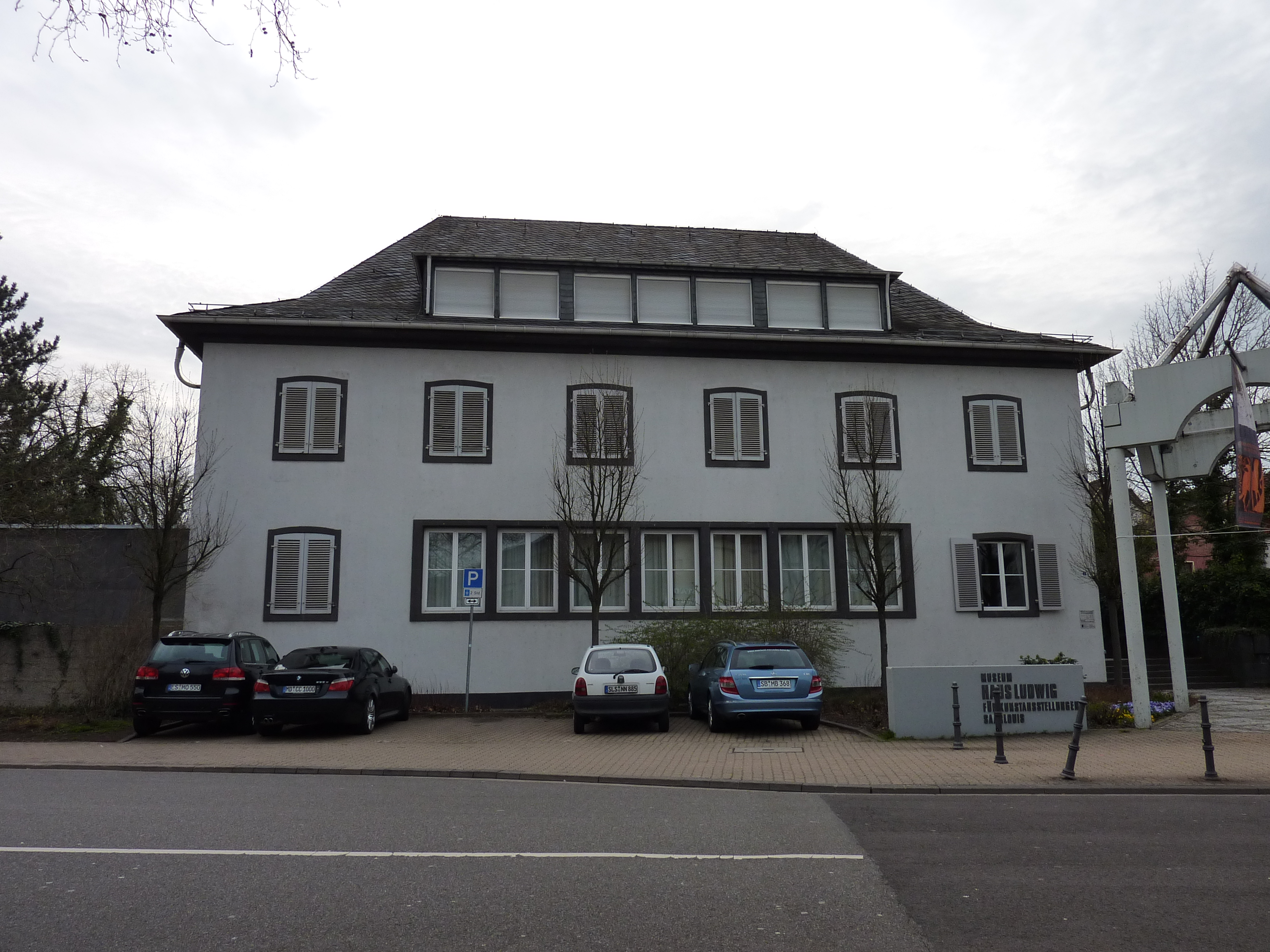
