= German trawler V 411 Saarland =

German fishing trawler

History
- Name: A. R. Giese (1934–35); Saarland (1934–44)
- Owner: Reederei Siebert & Co. (1934–39); Kriegsmarine (1939–44)
- Port of registry: (Nazi Germany) Wesermünde, Germany (1934–39); Kriegsmarine (1939–44)
- Builder: Deschimag Seebeckwerft
- Yard number: 520
- Launched: 27 June 1934
- Completed: 4 August 1934
- Commissioned: 25 September 1939
- Out of service: 26 August 1944
- Identification: Fishing boat registration PG 416 (1934–39); Code Letters DEWJ; Pennant Number V 407 (1939); Pennant Number V 411 (1939–44)

General characteristics
- Type: Fishing trawler (1934–39); Vorpostenboot (1939–44)
- Tonnage: 435 GRT, 162 NRT
- Length: 51.35 metres (168 ft 6 in)
- Beam: 8.00 metres (26 ft 3 in)
- Draught: 4.65 metres (15 ft 3 in)
- Depth: 3.74 metres (12 ft 3 in)
- Installed power: Triple expansion steam engine, 91nhp
- Propulsion: Single screw propeller
- Speed: 12 knots (22 km/h)

Saarland was a German fishing trawler that was built as A. R. Giese. Renamed in 1935, she was requisitioned by the Kriegsmarine in the Second World War for use as a Vorpostenboot. She served as V 407 Saarland and V 411 Saarland. She was sunk in the Gironde in 1944 by a boiler explosion.

== Description ==
The ship was 51.35 metres (168 ft 6 in) long, with a beam of 8.00 metres (26 ft 3 in). She had a depth of 3.74 metres (12 ft 3 in) and a draught of 4.5 metres (14 ft 9 in). She was assessed at 435 GRT, 162 NRT. She was powered by a triple expansion steam engine, which had cylinders of 35 centimetres (13 3/4 in), 55 centimetres (21 5/8 in) and 90 centimetres (35 7/16 in) diameter by 65 centimetres (25 9/16 in) stroke. The engine was made by Deschimag Seebeckwerft, Wesermünde, Germany. It was rated at 91nhp. The engine powered a single screw propeller driven via a low pressure turbine, double reduction gearing and a hydraulic coupling. It could propel the ship at 12 knots (22 km/h).

== History ==
The ship was built as yard number 520 by Deschimag Seekbeckwerft, Wesermünde for the Reederei Siebert & Co., Wesermünde. She was launched on 27 June 1934 and completed on 4 August. The fishing boat registration PG 416 was allocated. She was allocated the Code Letters DEWJ. On 22 January 1935, she was renamed Saarland.

Saarland was requisitioned by the Kriegsmarine on 25 September 1939 for use as a vorpostenboot. She was allocated to 4 Vorpostenflotille as V 407 Saarland. On 16 October she was redesignated V 411 Saarland. On 26 August 1944, she was attacked at Le Verdon-sur-Mer, Gironde, France by Bristol Beaufighter aircraft of 236 Squadron, Royal Air Force and 404 Squadron, Royal Canadian Air Force. She suffered a boiler explosion and sank in the Gironde.

== Sources ==
- Gröner, Erich (1993). Die deutschen Kriegsschiffe 1815-1945 (in German). Vol. 8/I: Flußfahrzeuge, Ujäger, Vorpostenboote, Hilfsminensucher, Küstenschutzverbände (Teil 1). Koblenz: Bernard & Graefe. ISBN 3-7637-4807-5.
