= Heinrich Welsch =

Minister President of the Saarland (Saar Protectorate)
- In office 29 October 1955 – 1956
- Preceded by: Johannes Hoffmann
- Succeeded by: Hubert Ney

Personal details
- Born: 13 October 1888 Saarlouis, German Empire
- Died: 23 November 1976 (aged 88) Saarbrücken, West Germany
- Party: Christian People's Party of Saarland (CVP)
- Education: University of Freiburg, University of Bonn

Heinrich Welsch (13 October 1888 in Saarlouis – 23 November 1976 in Saarbrücken) was a German politician. He was Minister President of Saarland in 1955 and 1956.

== Life and career up to World War II ==
From 1908 to 1911 he studied law at the Universities of Freiburg, Munich and Bonn. In 1911 he graduated from the 1st state exam and then was a trainee at the local courts and Merzig Saarlouis, the District Court and the Prosecutor's Office and the Saarbrücken Higher Regional Court of Cologne. In 1921 he passed the 2nd state examination and was then until 1934 Attorney in Saarbrücken. From 1934 until 1935 he was head of the Gestapo in Trier, after being recommended by Hermann Göring. From 1935 to 1936 he acted as a representative of Germany at the Supreme Court vote in Saarland, which was to monitor the referendum on the membership of the Saarland. Then he served until 1945 as Chief Prosecutor at the Higher Regional Court in Zweibrücken. During this period he was also 1938-1940 Special Representative with the authority of the Reich Commissioner for the reunion of Austria with the German Reich and from 1940 to 1945 head of the German justice administration in occupied Lorraine.

Even after the war Welsch took numerous functions: From 1948 to 1957 he was president of the National Insurance Office and the country's supply Court of Saarland and 1950 Chairman of the Board of the Railways of the Saarland.

== Political offices ==
From 1951 to 1952 Welsch was the director of the Ministry of Labour and Welfare, and after the resignation of the Saarland Prime Minister Johannes Hoffmann, who thus drew the consequences of the rejection of the favoured him Saar Statute, he was, although he belonged to no party, on 29 October 1955 his successor as prime minister and at the same time Minister of Justice and Minister of Labour and Welfare. On 18 December 1955, the parliament of Saarland was newly elected. Welsch ruled with his Cabinet until 10 January 1956. His successor then was Hubert Ney.

== Other functions ==
- 1956–1973 president of the National Association Saar of the German Red Cross

== Awards ==
Heinrich Welsch was awarded the Grand Cross of Merit with Star and Sash of Merit of the Federal Republic of Germany.

In 1961, Welsch was made an honorary senator of Saarland University.

== Legacy ==
In 2018, Saarland University stripped Welsch of his honorary senatorship due to his involvement with the Nazi regime.
