= Coat of arms of Saarland =

Coat of arms of the German state of Saarland

Coat of arms of the Saarland
- Armiger: Saarland
- Shield: Quarterly: 1st, azure, semé of crosslets argent, a lion rampant of the last crowned Or and langued gules; 2nd, argent, a cross gyronné gules; 3rd, Or, on a bend gules three alerions argent; 4th, sable, a lion rampant Or armed, langued and crowned gules.
- Constituent parts: The arms of Saarbrücken (or Nassau-Saarbrücken), Archbishopric of Trier, Electorate of the Palatinate and Lorraine

This article is about the coat of arms of the German state of the Saarland.

== Description ==
The coat of arms of the Saarland is parted per cross:

- The first quarter shows the coat of arms of the prince of Nassau-Saarbrücken, a silver lion with golden crown, between nine crosslets argent. The shield is blue. It represents the town district of Saarbrücken and the district of Neunkirchen.
- The second quarter shows the coat of arms of the prince elector, archbishop of Trier, in Trier. The charge is a red three-dimensional symmetric cross. The arms are advance to the axis. It represents the districts of Merzig-Wadern and St Wendel.
- The third quarter shows the coat of arms of the duchy of Lorraine and represents the district of Saarlouis. It shows three silver alerions on a red bend, on a yellow field.
- The fourth quarter, the coat of arms of the prince elector Palatinate, represents the Saarpfalz district, which once was part of the Palatinate. The black shield is charged with a yellow lion rampant, whose claws and tongue are painted in red.

The actual legal base of the use of the coat of arms is:

The state parliament of the Saar has passed the following law, that is herewith promulgated:

The state coat-of-arms (appendix 1) shows in a half-round shield quarterly, from the position of the bearer:
1. dexter chief: Azure, seme of crosslets Argent, a Lion Argent crowned Or and langued Gules,
2. sinister chief: Argent, a cross gyronny Gules,
3. dexter base: Or, on a bend Gules three alerions Argent,
4. sinister base: Sable, a lion Or crowned, armed and langued Gules. Saarbrücken, 10 December 2001

— State Government Müller (Prime Minister); Kramp-Karrenbauer (Minister of the Interior and Sports), Saar Law on State Symbols of 7 November 2001 (Saarländisches Hoheitszeichengesetz(SHzG)vom 07.11.2001 (Amtsbl_02,566)geändert Art.1 Abs.3 des Gesetzes Nr.1587 zur organisationsrechtlichen Anpassung und Bereinigung von Landesgesetzen vom 15.02.06 (Amtsbl_06,474)):

== History ==
Territory of the Saar Basin 1920-1935

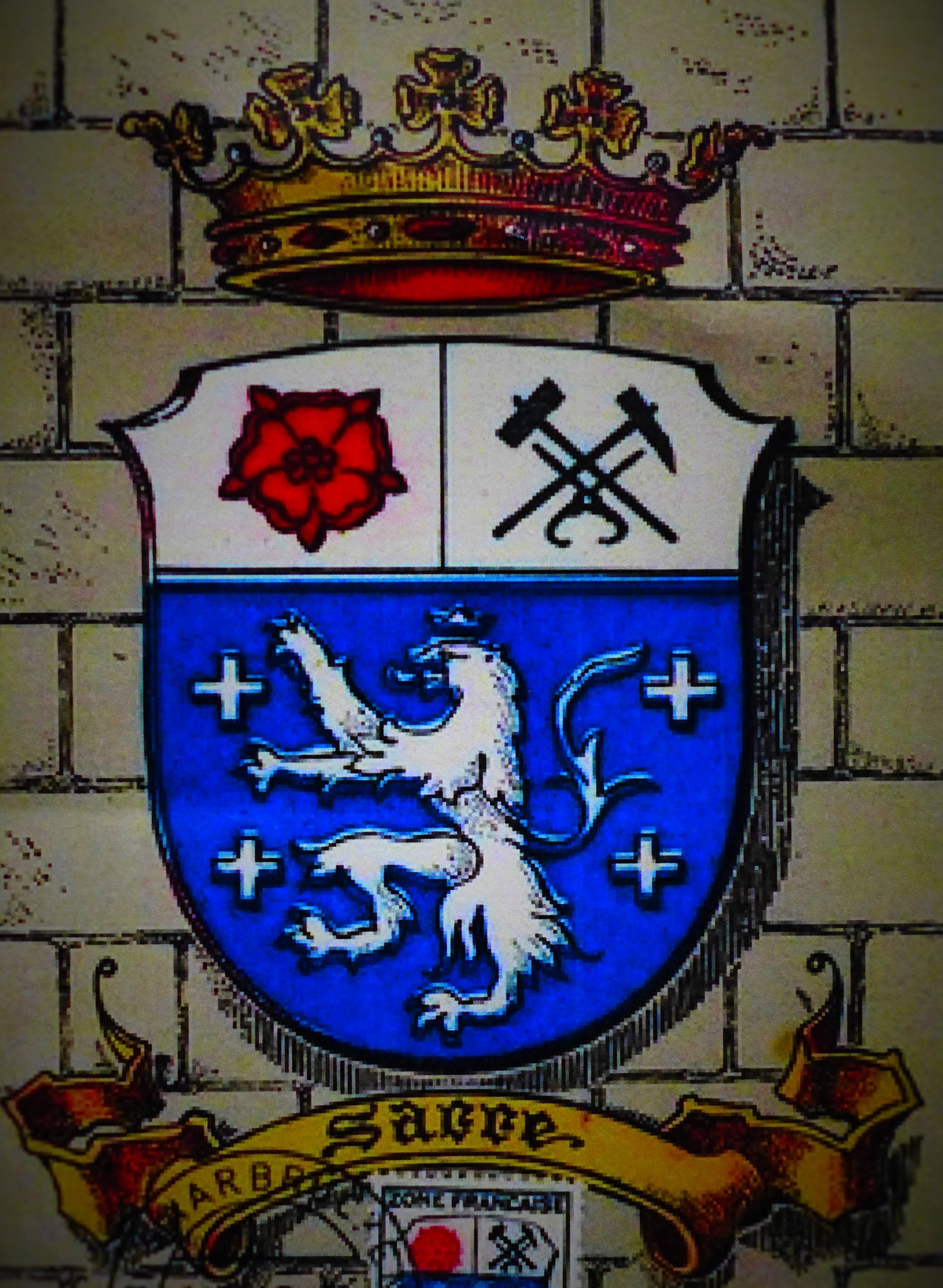
Saarland 1946–1948

Saarland 1946-1957

== See also ==
- Flag of Saarland
- Coat of arms of Prussia
- Coat of arms of Germany
- Origin of the coats of arms of German federal states.
