= Ceux de la Résistance =

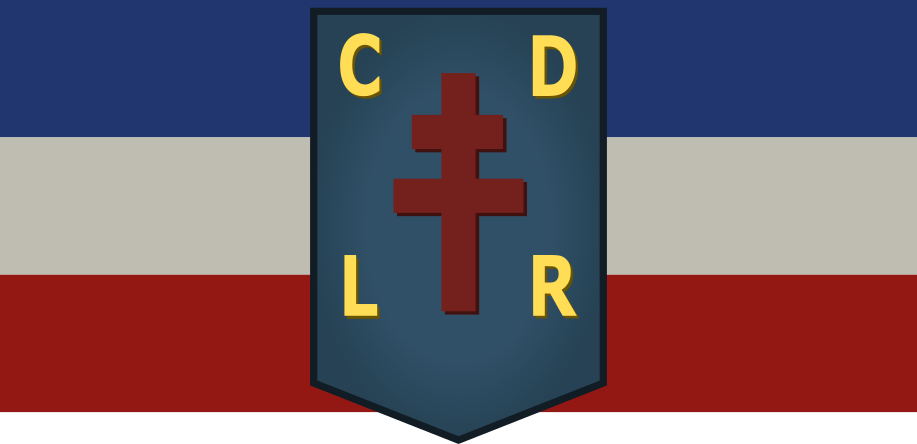

Ceux de la Résistance (French pronunciation: [sø də la ʁezistɑ̃s], lit. 'Those of the Resistance'; CDLR) was a French resistance movement during the German occupation of France in World War II.

At first, the members of CDLR distributed copies of the underground newspaper Combat in the north zone of France which was directly occupied by the Germans. After several leaders of the group were arrested in 1942, Jacques Lecompte-Boinet relaunched the network and became its leader in early 1943 with the help of Pierre Arrighi, a law student, and Jean de Voguë, who was occupied with intelligence-gathering.

On 19 August 1944, the CDLR movement received orders to depose of the mayor of Neuilly-sur-Seine in Paris, Max Roger.

CDLR recruited mostly among reserve officers, engineers and industrialists. It specialised in propaganda, intelligence-gathering, and active resistance such as assisting in Allied airdrops, taking care of shot down pilots, and running arms depots.

From its creation, the leaders of the CDLR movement decided to have a strictly apolitical manner in dealing with its resistance against the occupation.
