= 1955 Saar Statute referendum =

- 23 October 1955
- Do you approve the European Statute for the Saarland agreed between the Government of the Federal Republic of Germany and the Government of the French Republic on 23 October 1954 with the consent of the Government of the Saarland?

Results
Choice	Votes	%
Yes	201,973	32.29%
No	423,434	67.71%
Valid votes	625,407	97.55%
Invalid or blank votes	15,725	2.45%
Total votes	641,132	100.00%
Registered voters/turnout	662,839	96.73%

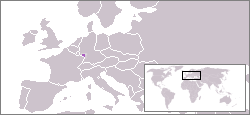
Saar's location

A referendum on the Saar statute was held in the Saar Protectorate on 23 October 1955. The statute would have made the territory an independent polity under the auspices of a European Commissioner, to be appointed by the Council of Ministers of the Western European Union, while remaining in the economic union with France.

Its rejection by voters was taken as an indication that they would rather reunite with West Germany. On 27 October 1956 France and West Germany concluded the Saar Treaty establishing that Saarland should be allowed to join West Germany as provided by article 23 of its constitution (Grundgesetz). Saarland subsequently became a state of Germany with effect from 1 January 1957.

== Results ==
Choice	Votes	%
For	201,973	32.29
Against	423,434	67.71
Total	625,407	100.00
Valid votes	625,407	97.55
Invalid/blank votes	15,725	2.45
Total votes	641,132	100.00
Registered voters/turnout	662,839	96.73
Source: CVCE

=== By constituency ===
Constituency	For		Against		Invalid/ blank	Total	Registered voters	Turnout
Constituency	Votes	%	Votes	%	Invalid/ blank	Total	Registered voters	Turnout
Saarbrücken-town	30,858	39.10	48,063	60.90	1,531	80,452	83,369	96.50
Saarbrücken-region	48,523	30.68	109,659	69.32	3,339	161,521	166,349	97.10
Saarlouis	36,074	34.63	68,094	65.37	3,590	107,758	111,260	96.85
Merzig-Wadern	16,980	32.67	34,991	67.33	1,691	53,662	55,661	96.41
Ottweiler	30,620	30.66	69,256	69.34	2,379	102,255	105,927	96.53
Sankt Wendel	12,200	24.56	37,484	75.44	1,266	50,950	52,824	96.45
Sankt Ingbert	15,866	37.39	26,573	62.61	1,104	43,543	45,287	96.15
Homburg	10,852	27.02	29,314	72.98	826	40,992	42,125	97.31
Total	201,973	32.29	423,434	67.71	15,725	641,132	662,839	96.73
Source: CVCE

== See also ==
- 1935 Saar status referendum
