= Social Democratic Party of Saarland =

The Social Democratic Party of Saarland (German: Sozialdemokratische Partei des Saarlands, abbreviated SPS) was a political party existing between 1946 and 1956 in the Saar Protectorate. It had a short-lived predecessor, the Social Democratic Regional Party of the Saar Territory (German: Sozialdemokratische Landespartei des Saargebiets, abbreviated SPdS) existing between 1933 and 1935 in the Saar Territory.

== Before its foundation ==
In 1872, the Social Democratic Party of Germany (SPD) gathered a meeting for the first time in a city of the Saar Basin, in St. Johann (now a locality of Saarbrücken); they met in order to gain supporters starting local party activities. However, the SPD was less successful in the industrial region of the Saar Basin, usually called the Saar Coal District (German: Saarrevier) than in other industrialised areas of the German Empire. This was due to the dominance of the coal and steel industry in the Saar Coal District which showed strong paternalistic features, providing its workers better life conditions than in other branches which again played a more important role in other industrial regions of Germany. Another feature was the strong conservatism among many Saar Basin inhabitants, with Catholic voters often rather clinging to the Centre Party or voters of declared Protestant alignment, a minority in the Saar Basin, voting for the National Liberal Party.

However, it took until 1893 that an agitation committee (Agitationskomitee) was founded in Saarbrücken in order to tour the Trier Region spreading SPD ideas and encouraging the foundation of local organisations in that region, of which the Prussian part of the Saar Basin formed part until 1920. In 1898, the Saar Coal District election association (Wahlverein Saarrevier) was founded to support SPD candidates running for the Reichstag. In 1903 the joint agitation committee for the Reichstag constituencies Trier Region No. 4 (with Saarlouis, Merzig, Saarburg in the Rhineland) and No. 5 (Saarbrücken; No. 4 and 5 mostly covering the Prussian Saar Coal District), Palatinate No. 4 (with Zweibrücken, Pirmasens, covering the southwest of that Bavarian Region) and Alsace-Lorraine No. 12 (with Saargemünd, Forbach in Lorraine, covering the northeast of the Department of Lorraine) was formed, seated in Saarbrücken.

In the Reichstag election of 1912, the SPD gained 13% of the votes in the city of Saarbrücken, the second lowest result for the SPD among all the German cities with more than 100,000 inhabitants. In 1917, the SPD split into the more radical Independent Social Democrats (USPD) and the more moderate Majority Social Democrats (MSPD), reuniting in 1922. The Social Democrats in the Saar Territory then formed the SPD, Unterbezirk Saar, one of the lower-ranking regional subdivisions within the reunited party (Unterbezirk, i.e. subdistrict).

After the separation of the Territory of the Saar Basin (Saar Territory) from Germany in 1920 and the takeover of all the coal and steel industry by the French government in order to exploit reparations the antagonism between capitalists and workers, formerly less developed in the Saar Coal District with its many paternalistic entrepreneurs, turned into a matter conceived as a nationalist issue, simplified as French government agents exploiting German workers. Nationalist opinions heated up.

In the Saar Territory, there was no home-rule by the citizens but a government, the Governing Commission (German: Regierungskommission, Reko) appointed by the League of Nations. The Reko consisted of five members, none elected by the people, but one appointed by France, one by Germany, who had to be a native from the Saar Territory, and three other nationals appointed by the League of Nations. The members of the Governing Commission served one year terms. The Governing Commission decided on all legislation autonomously. According to paragraph 23 of the Versailles Treaty the Governing Commission was to establish an assembly of elected representatives of the inhabitants of the Saar Territory in such a manner as the Governing Commission would determine itself. So on 24 March 1922, after four years without any official representation of the people, the Reko decreed the formation of a Saar Territory assembly called the Regional Council (German: Landesrat). In June 1922 the Governing Commission held the first election of the Regional Council, and starting with the second election of the Regional Council the legislation period was extended from three to four years, with elections in 1928, and in 1932.

The Regional Council counted 30 members, the Governing Commission deliberately determined one person as the chairperson, the president of the Regional Council (Landesratspräsident). In the first legislation period the Reko did not even choose the president from the midst of the Regional Council. The assembly was no parliament, but only consultative, the representatives were only to be heard, but had no say in legislation. The agenda of matters to be debated was exclusively set up by the Governing Commission. The members of the Regional Council had neither the right of interpellation, nor the right to actively bring a subject to the agenda, let alone they were entitled to table a bill. Its members did not enjoy immunity. So in case the Governing Commission did not set an issue on the Regional Council's agenda it could only send delegations to the League of Nations with pleads, and so the Regional Council did. In the Regional Council the SPD had five (1922, 1928), six (1924) and three seats (1932), with over the years altogether nine different Social Democratic representatives being once or more often elected.

With this situation being as it was also the Social Democrats joined the so-called pro-German block in the Regional Council opposing the autocratic rule by the Governing Commission. The SPD demanded the return of the Saar Territory to Germany in order to let the Saar people live in a country allowing the people to elect a parliament and its government in self-determination.

In Nazi Germany, with many Social Democrats already arrested, hiding, exiled or even killed since the Nazi takeover, the SPD was officially outlawed on 22 June 1933, as were the trade unions and all kinds of workers organisations in the fields of education, culture, sports and the like more. Those members of the SPD Reich executive, still not arrested, not yet exiled and able to flee arrived in the Saar Territory right after the ban of the party in Germany. As an organisation based in the Saar Territory the Unterbezirk Saar was not subject to the party ban in Germany and the SPD Reich executive and the SPD Saar regional executive held consultations on the situation and what to do. Whereas the majority of the Reich executive abstained from and rejected any cooperation of the SPD with parties like the Communist Party of Germany (KPD), which was no less in favour of a dictatorship than the Nazis, the Saar executive felt like forming a cooperation with the Communists, who had long been fighting the Weimar democracy and the SPD as its supporters, denouncing Social Democrats as social fascists.

After the Nazi takeover in Germany, the Social Democrats and the Communists in the Saar Territory, with both their central party organisations in Germany destroyed and many of their fellow party comrades jailed or even murdered, quit the joint opposition by the parties in the Regional Council against the autocratic government system in the Saar Territory. The Social Democrats yet upheld their demand for democracy, but with Germany having transformed into a dictatorship the status quo in the Saar Territory happened to be the minor evil.

The communists with their own ideas on the dictatorship of the proletariat, also feared a return of the Saar Territory to a Nazi-ruled Germany. SPD and KPD in the Saar Territory now campaigned for continuing the status quo, with the SPD hoping for a reestablishment of a democratic Germany, and the communists wishing a Soviet Germany. However, the other parties in the Regional Council further supported the return of the Saar Territory as soon as possible even though also their party organisations within Nazi Germany had been forbidden, or dissolved anticipating that, and party members were deposed from offices, banned from the public or arrested.

By a cooperation with the communists, the Unterbezirk Saar executive wanted to combine all willing powers in order to win votes in the upcoming referendum against an immediate return to Germany, but for a continuation of the status quo. Of course, the SPD Reich executive was also clearly for upholding the status quo, but against campaigning with the communists. After some days in the Saar Territory, the SPD Reich executive moved on to Prague where the SPD Reich executive, adopting its exile name SoPaDe, could stay until the powers concluding the Munich Agreement decided the break-up of Czechoslovakia in October 1938.

== 1933 to 1935: Social Democratic Regional Party of the Saar Territory ==
On 12 November 1933, the Unterbezirk Saar of the SPD held its party convention in Saarbrücken, approved by the SoPaDe and attended by its representatives and delegates of the Socialist International. At this convention the Unterbezirk Saar, in dissent with the SoPaDe on the cooperation with the communists, assumed independence from the SPD and reconstituted as an independent party, the Social Democratic Regional Party of the Saar Territory (German: Sozialdemokratische Landespartei des Saargebietes; SPdS, sometimes also abbreviated as SLS).

On 2 July 1934, the SPdS and the Saar Communists started their cooperation. Whereas the referendum was originally planned to offer the electorate only a choice between the Saar Territory returning to Germany or being annexed to France, the supporters of maintaining the status quo prompted the Governing Commission to add this as a third option to the ballot papers. In 1935, the SPdS and the Saar branch of the KPD formed a united front. On behalf of the SPdS, the declaration of the front, issued on January 29, 1935, was signed by Max Braun, since 1928 head of the Unterbezirk Saar and then the SPdS, respectively. Emil Kirschmann was the party secretary of SPdS.

== 1935 to 1945: Suppression and refoundation as the SPD Saar ==
However, in the 1935 Saar status referendum the inhabitants of the Saar Territory voted by a majority for the reunification of the Saar Territory with Germany. Subsequently, the SPdS was outlawed, many of its followers, especially those known for having officiated in party functions, fled the Saar Territory between the referendum and the Nazi takeover. More than 40 Social Democrats from the Saar Territory were killed by the Nazi regime.

In Völklingen, the first local SPD organisation was refounded in summer 1945. Max Braun, the exiled last president of the SPdS prepared his return to the Saar Basin, but died in London in July. In October 1945, the Saar Basin was under French occupation since July, the Social Democratic district organisation refounded after 10 years of suppression in the rear meeting room of a Saarbrücken restaurant. Its original name then was Social Democratic Party of Germany, Saar district (SPD, Bezirk Saar), adopting the SPD naming of the highest ranking regional subdivisions (Bezirk, i.e. district).

== 1946 to 1956: Social Democratic Party of Saarland ==
However, the French occupation authority, preparing the separation of the Saar Area from Allied-occupied Germany insisted on removing the term Germany and the party was renamed as Social Democratic Party, Saar district, in order to get it registered in January 1946. This official separation from the SPD, however, was not followed by adopting its own Saar party platform.

Nevertheless, in practice the leaders of the Social Democratic Party of Saarland condoned and soon backed the French policy of economically integrating the Saar Area with France, whereas politically the Social Democrats strived for the Saar's autonomy. Within the party, however, there were three groupings with different opinions, those demanding a full annexation of the Saar to France, those condemning this attitude as separatism and promoting the reunification with Germany, and thirdly those wanting an autonomous Saar.

At the Saar Landtag elections in 1947 (32.8%), in 1952 (32.4%), the SPS never surpassed the results of the Christian People's Party of Saarland (CVP, with 51.2% in 1947, and 54.7% in 1952), and thus - as the junior partner - joined a coalition with it under Johannes Hoffmann from 1947 to April 1951 with two ministers, Richard Kirn for the department of labour and welfare and Heinz Braun for the justice department. In Hoffmann's second cabinet there were no SPS ministers, but Braun and Kirn rejoined his third cabinet officiating from 23 December 1952 to 17 July 1954. Then the coalition of CVP and SPS fell because of the conflict over the law on forming employees' works councils.

As to the Saar question, the SPS leaders maintained their position, cherishing the idea of a co-operative Europe, and campaigned for the Saar statute in the 1955 Saar referendum. This, of course, was subject to criticism from some within the party, which led to long-lasting and embittered controversies among the party members. A first attempt of the pro-German faction within the SPS, led by Ernst Roth, to win the party for their opinion, led to the total isolation of Roth, who was finally forced to resign as a member of the party's executive. A second attempt in 1951 led by Kurt Conrad gained enough support so that Conrad ran as a candidate for the party chairmanship against Kirn, and another pro-German candidate ran for the deputy chairmanship. These attempts failed, but Kirn was only re-elected against the opposition of a visible minority. Although the pro-German faction was growing, Kirn initiated a procedure to exclude Conrad from the party. Before this could happen he resigned from the party.

On 14 March 1952, some disaffected members of the SPS applied to register a new political party, the German Social Democratic Party (DSP), which had been unofficially formed as an SPS intra-party group in 1947, but the authorities refused to allow the registration. In July 1955, the banning of so-called pro-German parties was lifted and the DSP then stepped into the daylight.

The Saar electorate reacted to these developments in the December 1955 elections by giving a disappointing 5.8% share in the vote for the SPS. On the other hand, the DSP won 14.3%. As a consequence the SPS then decided to merge with the DSP with effect from 18 March 1956, then forming the Landesverband Saar (Saar state association) of the Social Democratic Party of Germany. The Saar Protectorate was transformed into the state of Saarland within West Germany on the occasion of the Little Reunification of Germany on 1 January 1957.
