= Sozialistischer Schutzbund (Saar) =

Sozialistischer Schutzbund ('Socialist Protection League', abbreviated SSB) was a paramilitary formation in Saar, linked to the Social Democratic Party of Saarland (SPS).

== Foundation ==
SSB was formed in 1933 by the Saar organization of the German Reichsbanner Schwarz-Rot-Gold, following the ban of the German mother organization in Germany proper in March/April 1933. The founding meeting was held in the Saarbrücken Workers Welfare House in on March 27, 1933. Jakob Frank was elected as the leader of the organization.

The name SSB was adopted on June 17, 1933. Through the choice of name the organization manifested that the ideological compromise of the Reichsbanner had ended.

== Leadership ==
Frank had gained experience as an organizer in Reichsbanner and the Iron Front. However, in the background the party chairman Max Braun acted as the de facto leader of the organization. Braun would inspire many SSB youth activists fighting against a Nazi take-over in the Saar territory. Heinz Kühn (who later became the Minister-President of North Rhine-Westphalia) was the leader of the youth formation of SSB.

== Organization ==
The set-up of the organization followed that of Reichsbanner and the Austrian Republikanischer Schutzbund. SSB had its headquarters in Sulzbach. There are no definitive records of the size of the organization. According to one account it counted some 200-300 men in its ranks.

SSB sought to circumvent the ban on uniforms imposed by the Government Commission, and its members wore green shirt, black pants and boots at public appearances. SSB possessed some light handguns and some ammunition, but lacked regular weaponry.

== Activities ==
SSB acted as security forces at mass meetings, and during election campaigns smaller teams of SSB fighters confronted the National Socialist groups. SSB activists also acted as body guards for Max Braun, who faced death threats at the time.

== Aftermath ==
A number of the Saar German fighters in the International Brigades during the Spanish Civil War were former SSB members.
