= Reichensperger =

Surname list

Reichensperger is a surname. Notable people with the surname include:

- August Reichensperger (born 22 March 1808 – died 16 July 1895), German Catholic politician
- Peter Reichensperger (born 28 May 1810 - died 31 December 1892), German jurist and parliamentarian for Centre Party
