= Johann Helfgen =

German politician

Johann Helfgen was a German politician. He was born in Dudweiler on May 9, 1887.

Helfgen did military service 1907-1909, and fought in the First World War 1914-1915. He worked as a miner. He joined the Independent Social Democratic Party of Germany (USPD) in 1917. In 1920 he became a member of the Communist Party of Germany (KPD). At the 7th party congress in August 1921 Helfgen was elected as an alternate member of the KPD Central Committee, representing the Middle Rhine Party District. In 1922 he became the chairman of the KPD branch in Dudweiler. Helfgen topped the candidate list of KPD in the 1922 Saar Regional Council election. He was one of two KPD candidates elected to the Regional Council.

Helfgen was expelled from the party in 1926. Later he became an official of the Saar Economic Association. In November 1933 he joined the Saar Socialist Party. With increased tensions in the Saar, Helfgen migrated to France on January 16, 1935. In Dudweiler a SA musical troupe had staged a mock execution in front of his residence.

Helfgen returned to Saar in 1945, and served as local official in Ludweiler/Warndt for a brief period. He worked for the Movement for the Return of Saar to France. In 1951 he moved back to Dudweiler. Helfgen died in Dudweiler on December 19, 1966.
