= Peter Reichensperger =

German jurist

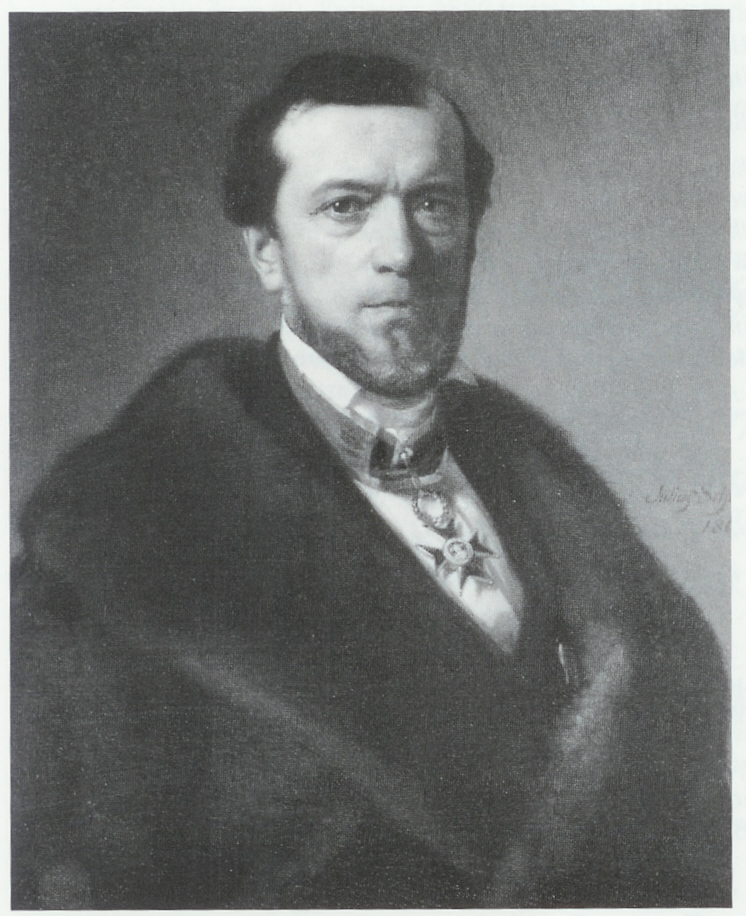
Peter Reichensperger

Peter Reichensperger (28 May 1810 – 31 December 1892) was a German jurist and parliamentarian for Centre Party.

== Life ==
Born in Koblenz on 28 May 1810 and he studied at Bonn and Heidelberg and was successively a counsellor at Koblenz (1843), of the court of appeal at Cologne (1850) and of the supreme court of Berlin (1859) until its dissolution (1879). From 1848 he was active as a parliamentarian in the Prussian Diet, the Erfurt Volkshaus, the Prussian second chamber (1849), the constituent North-German Reichstag (1857), the Customs' Parliament (1868), and the German Reichstag, representing in the last-mentioned the same district from 1871 to his death.

He worked closely with his elder brother August Reichensperger and, like the latter, he defended the Rhenish system of laws against the minister von Kamptz ("Oeffentlichkeit, Mündlichkeit und Schwurgerichte", 1834). Like his brother, he collaborated with the author in de Failly's much-discussed book (De la Prusse, 1842), and they jointly drew up a petition for electoral reform (1847). In the same year was published one of his best works: Die Agrarfrage aus dem Gesichtspunkt der Nationalökonomie, der Politik und des Rechts (The agricultural question from the perspective of economics, politics and law).

In 1858, when a collection of their parliamentary speeches appeared, the brothers published their political programme in the pamphlet Die Wahlen zum preußischen Abgeordnetenhause, and two years later Deutschlands nächste Aufgaben für die Zukunft. They defended constitutional monarchy and religious autonomy. Less versatile than his brother, Peter surpassed him in juristic keenness and intellectual depth.

In special writings, he combated the income tax (1850), the abolition of the usury laws (1860), and the corn tax (1887). At the request of the Ministry of Justice, he drafted a mortgage law (1851). Five years later, he wrote on free agricultural laws, in 1872 on the relation between Church and State and in 1876 on the peace between Church and State. In 1882, appeared his experiences as an old parliamentarian in the revolutionary year 1848. Though co-founder and leader of the Centre, he followed in many individual questions his own views, e.g. in the extension of the socialist law and in the question of the septennate.

Died in Berlin on 31 December 1892.

== Bibliography ==
- Herbermann, Charles, ed. (1913). "Peter Reichensperger" . Catholic Encyclopedia. New York: Robert Appleton Company. which in turn cites:
  - Gorres in Staatslexikon der Gorresgesellschaft (3rd ed., 1911)
