= Uwe Witt =

German politician

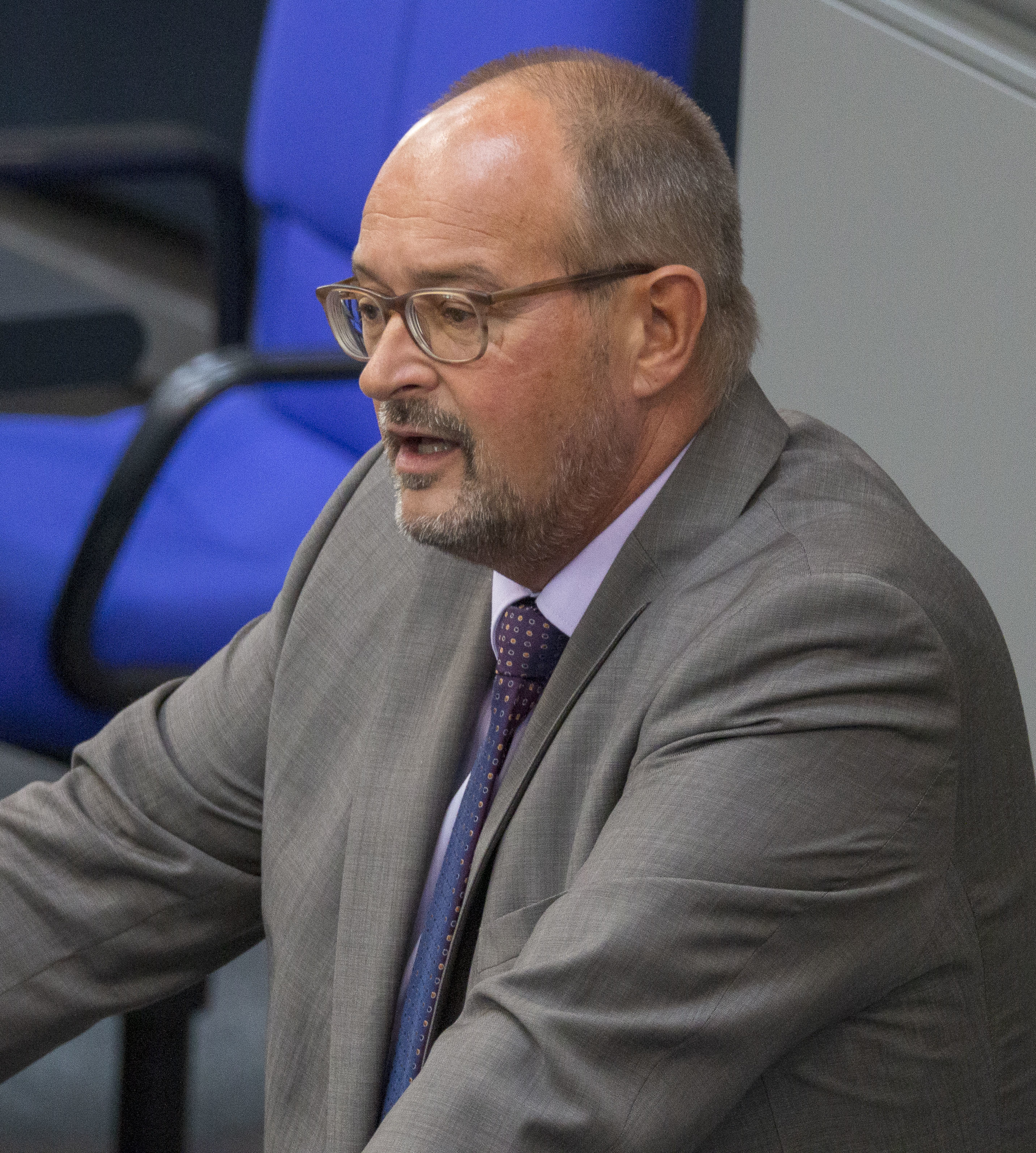
- Witt in 2020

Member of the Bundestag
- Incumbent
- Assumed office 24 October 2017

Personal details
- Born: 1 October 1959 (age 66) Witten, West Germany
- Party: Bündnis Deutschland (since Dec 2024); Independent (Aug 2022–Dec 2024); Centre Party (Jan–Aug 2022); AfD (until 2021)

Uwe Witt (born 1 October 1959 in Witten) is a German politician, serving as a member of the Bundestag since 2017.

Formerly a member of Alternative for Germany (AfD), Witt resigned from the party in December 2021, citing extremist elements in the party.

He joined the Centre Party in January 2022, though would later resign from the party in August that same year. He ended up with Bündnis Deutschland (BD) in December 2024.

== Life ==
Born in Witten, North Rhine-Westphalia, Witt became a member of the Bundestag after the 2017 German federal election. Witt has served as a party list member of the Bundestag from the state of North Rhine-Westphalia since 2017. He previously served as a member of Alternative for Germany before defecting to the Centre Party in January 2022.

Witt joined BD in late December 2024, making him his new party's first federal legislator.

He is a member of the Committee for Labour and Social Affairs and the Committee for Health.
