= Heinrich Troeger =

German politician

Heinrich Troeger (4 March 1901 – 28 August 1975) was a German jurist and politician (SPD).

== Life and career ==
Troeger was born in Zeitz, the son of a medical officer of health (Kreismedizinalrat). After obtaining his Abitur, he studied law and political science at the universities of Breslau, Würzburg and Halle and earned a doctoral degree in law in 1922. In 1925 he was a government assessor at the district administration offices in Euskirchen and Dortmund.

A member of the SPD since 1922, Troeger was in 1926 elected mayor of Neusalz. He also was a member of the provincial parliament of Lower Silesia and the provincial committee from 1929 to 1933. After the Nazi seizure of power in 1933, he was relieved of his political offices and, from 1934 to 1945, he worked as a lawyer specializing in foreign exchange and tax law in Berlin, ending with the title of Verwaltungsrechtsrat (administrative law councilor).

After World War II, Troeger briefly served as mayor of Jena (1945–1946). Shortly afterwards, he moved to West Germany and settled in Hesse. In 1947, he was appointed assistant secretary in the Ministry of Finance of Hesse, and served from 1947 until 1949 as secretary-general of the Council of the Bizone. In 1950-51, he served as assistant secretary in the Ministry of Finance for North Rhine-Westphalia under deputy minister Heinrich Weitz and was also a member of various supervisory boards.

From 10 January 1951 until 26 September 1956, Troeger served as Minister of Finance for the state of Hesse under premier Georg August Zinn. He was elected to the Landtag of Hesse in 1954 and retained his position until his resignation on 3 February 1958.

In 1956–57 Troeger was president of the Hesse Central Bank and in 1958–1969 was vice president of the Deutsche Bundesbank. During this time, he initiated an eponymous commission on the Reform of the Financial Condition. He disd in Bad Nauheim in August 1975.

== Honours ==
- 1966 – Grand Cross with Star and Sash of the Order of Merit of the Federal Republic of Germany

Preceded by Armin Schmidt	Mayor of Jena; 1945–1946	Succeeded by Heinrich Mertens
