= 1928 Saar parliamentary election =

Elections to the consultative Regional Council (Landesrat) were held in the territory of the Saar Basin on 25 March 1928. The Centre Party remained the largest faction, winning 14 of the 30 seats. Peter Scheuer of the Centre Party was re-elected President of the Landesrat.

== Results ==
Party	Votes	%	Seats	+/–
Centre Party	129,162	46.39	14	0
Communist Party	46,541	16.72	5	0
Social Democratic Party	43,557	15.64	5	–1
German-Saarland People's Party	26,230	9.42	3	–1
German National People's Party	10,536	3.78	1	+1
Christian Social Party of Saar Territory	9,321	3.35	1	New
Economic Party	9,154	3.29	1	0
German Democratic Party	3,923	1.41	0	–1
Total	278,424	100.00	30	0
Valid votes	278,424	98.42		
Invalid/blank votes	4,467	1.58		
Total votes	282,891	100.00		
Registered voters/turnout	427,901	66.11		
Source: Gonschior.de
