= 1922 Saar parliamentary election =

25 June 1922	1924 →
- All 30 seats in the Landesrat
Party	Leader	Vote %	Seats
Centre	Bartholomäus Koßmann	47.72	16
SPD	Valentin Schäfer	15.11	5
LVP		12.84	4
VHL		8.31	2
KPD		7.52	2
DDP		3.90	1
This lists parties that won seats. See the complete results below.
President of the Landesrat after
Bartholomäus Koßmann; Centre Party

Elections to the consultative Regional Council (Landesrat) were held in the territory of the Saar Basin on 25 June 1922. The Centre Party emerged as the largest faction, winning 16 of the 30 seats. Bartholomäus Koßmann of the Centre Party was elected President of the Landesrat on 19 July.

== Results ==
Party	Votes	%	Seats
Centre Party	92,252	47.72	16
Social Democratic Party	29,207	15.11	5
Liberal People's Party of Saar Territory	24,829	12.84	4
Association of Homeowners and Agriculture	16,063	8.31	2
Communist Party	14,532	7.52	2
German Democratic Party	7,539	3.90	1
Tenant Protection Association	4,137	2.14	0
Independent Social Democratic Party	2,715	1.40	0
War Victims	2,030	1.05	0
Total	193,304	100.00	30
Valid votes	193,304	99.64	
Invalid/blank votes	696	0.36	
Total votes	194,000	100.00	
Registered voters/turnout	356,141	54.47	
Source: Gonschior.de
