= Christian Otte (politician) =

German businessman and politician (born 1971)

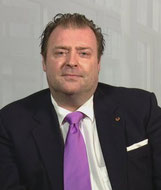

Leader of the German Centre Party
- Incumbent
- Assumed office April 2022
- Preceded by: Klaus Brall

Personal details
- Born: 1971 (age 54–55) Neuss, North Rhine-Westphalia, Germany
- Party: German Centre Party

Christian Otte (born 1971 in Neuss) is a German businessman and politician. He has been federal chairman of the German Center Party since April 2022.

== Biography ==
He comes from a medium-sized family company for pump systems from Kaarst. As a trained commercial lawyer, he is responsible for commercial management there.

Otte is both the federal chairman of the German Center Party and its state chairman in North Rhine-Westphalia. Previously he was General Secretary of the party. He is a member of the city council of Kaarst and chairman of the center city association. He is also deputy chairman of the real estate committee, the main, economic and financial committee. He is also a member of the Board of Trustees of the Kaarst-Büttgen Savings Banks Foundation.

In the state elections in North Rhine-Westphalia in 2022, he took first place on the state list of the Center Party, unsuccessfully with only 4,162 second votes.
