= Geoffrey Knox =

British diplomat (1884–1958)

Sir Geoffrey Knox

President of the Commission for the Government of the Saar Basin
- In office 1 April 1932 – 28 February 1935
- Preceded by: Ernest Wilton
- Succeeded by: position abolished

British Ambassador to Brazil
- In office 1939–1941
- Preceded by: Sir William Seeds
- Succeeded by: Sir Noel Charles

Personal details
- Born: Geoffrey George Knox; 11 March 1884 Double Bay, Sydney, Australia
- Died: 6 April 1958 (aged 74) Tobago, Trinidad and Tobago
- Education: Malvern College
- Occupation: Diplomat

Sir Geoffrey George Knox KCMG (11 March 1884 – 6 April 1958) was a British diplomat who served as High Commissioner of the League of Nations at Saar from 1 April 1932 to 1 March 1935 and the Ambassador of the United Kingdom to Brazil from 1939 to 1941.

== Biography ==
He was born on 11 March 1884 in Double Bay, Australia, to Jane de Brixton née Price and George Knox. Knox attended Malvern College in England and entered the Levant Consular Service in early 1906. His first two years of training involved studying languages at Trinity College, Cambridge. As a diplomat, Knox was first stationed in Persia, where he became acting consul at Kermanshah and Shiraz in 1910 and 1911, respectively. The following year, he became vice-consul in Cairo. During World War I, Knox worked as consul-general in Greece at Salonika (1915) and Cavalla (1915–1916). For the rest of the war, he served in the Royal Naval Reserve and was mentioned in dispatches. Upon the end of the war, he re-entered diplomacy, being stationed in 1919 in Bucharest and from August 1920 as a secretary in Constantinople.

In December 1923, Knox moved to Berlin, where he worked for three years before being promoted to acting counsellor in Turkey. He developed lung problems and did not work for two years, beginning in 1928. In 1930 Knox returned to work at the Foreign Office, but he was forced again to cease work until he was transferred to Madrid in July 1931. On 1 April 1932, Knox became High Commissioner of the League of Nations at Saar, managing the territories affairs in the face of increasing hostility from Nazi Germany. Knox left the position on 1 March 1935, as the territory reunified with Germany. Anthony Eden respected Knox for his efforts. After serving at Saar, the Foreign Office made Knox minister to Hungary in 1935. His health again forced him to switch roles, and Knox served as Ambassador of the United Kingdom to Brazil from 1939 to 1941, when he retired. Knox died at his home in Tobago on 6 April 1958 and was never married.
