= Ernest Wilton =

British diplomat

Sir Ernest Wilton KCMG

President of the Commission for the Government of the Saar Basin
- In office 9 June 1927 – 31 March 1932
- Preceded by: George Washington Stephens, Jr.
- Succeeded by: Geoffrey George Knox

Personal details
- Born: 6 February 1870 Singapore
- Died: 28 December 1952 (aged 82) Ashington, England
- Education: Bedford Modern School
- Occupation: Diplomat

Sir Ernest Colville Collins Wilton KCMG (born 6 February 1870 in Singapore; died 28 December 1952 in Ashington, England) was a British diplomat and President of the Commission for the Government of the Saar Basin between 1927 and 1932.

== Life ==
His parents were both naturalised British, the Danish-born mother and father born in the Netherlands. He was educated at Bedford Modern School.

In 1890, he joined the British diplomatic service in China and worked in various diplomatic posts for the next 30 years. For his service in the British missions to Tibet and the related negotiations with China in 1904 as he was appointed Companion in the Order of St. Michael and St. George. During World War I, he continued serving in various diplomatic and customs posts in China. He returned to Europe in 1919 and served as one of the Allied Arbitration Commission for 1919/20 Polish–Czechoslovak border conflicts for the border town Cieszyn (or Teschen). Subsequently, he was a British envoy in all three Baltic States. In 1923 he was promoted to Knight Commander of the Order of St. Michael's and St. George. From 1923 to 1926, he was a member of an International Commission to the Chinese Salt Trade before he was in 1927 appointed President of the Commission for the Government of the Saar Basin. In 1932, he resigned from that office to retire for health reasons.

Diplomatic posts
Preceded by no-one	Envoy Extraordinary and Minister Plenipotentiary to the Republics of Estonia, Lavia and Lithuania; 1919–1923	Succeeded by John Charles Tudor Vaughan
Preceded by George Washington Stephens, Jr.	President of the Commission for the Government of the Saar Basin; 1927–1932	Succeeded by Sir Geoffrey George Knox
