= Centre Party (Germany) =

Political party in Germany

German Centre Party Deutsche Zentrumspartei
- Federal Chairman: Christian Otte
- Founder: Joseph Görres
- Founded: 13 December 1870; 155 years ago (original form); 1945; 81 years ago (current form)
- Headquarters: Straberger Weg 12 41542, Dormagen, NRW
- Youth wing: Windthorstbund
- Paramilitary wing: Reichsbanner Schwarz-Rot-Gold (1924–1930)
- Membership: ▲600 (2022 est.)
- Ideology: Christian democracy; Political Catholicism; Republicanism (after 1918)
- Political position: Centre to centre-right
- Religion: Catholicism
- International affiliation: White International (historical)
- Colours: Black; White; Blue
- Bundestag: 0 / 630
- Bundesrat: 0 / 69
- State parliaments: 0 / 1,884
- European Parliament: 0 / 96
- Heads of State Governments: 0 / 16

Party flag

Website
- zentrumspartei.de
- Politics of Germany; Political parties; Elections; Flag used until 1933

The Centre Party (German: Zentrum, Z), officially the German Centre Party (German: Deutsche Zentrumspartei, DZP) and also known in English as the Catholic Centre Party, is a Christian democratic political party in Germany. It was most influential in the German Empire and Weimar Republic. Formed in 1870, it successfully battled the Kulturkampf waged by Chancellor Otto von Bismarck against the Catholic Church. It soon won a quarter of the seats in the Reichstag, and its middle position on most issues allowed it to play a decisive role in the formation of majorities. The party name Zentrum (Centre) originally came from the fact that Catholic representatives would take up the middle section of seats in parliament between the social democrats and the conservatives.

For most of the Weimar Republic, the Centre Party was the third-largest party in the Reichstag and a bulwark of the Republic, participating in all governments until 1932. Following Adolf Hitler's rise to power in early 1933, the Centre Party was among the parties who voted for the Enabling Act, which granted legislative powers to Hitler's government. Nevertheless, the party was pressured into dissolving itself on 5 July, as the Nazi Party became the only legally permitted party in the country shortly thereafter.

After World War II, the party was reconstituted, but could not rise again to its former importance, as most of its members joined the new interdenominational Christian Democratic Union (CDU) and, in Bavaria, the Christian Social Union (CSU). The Centre Party continued on as a marginal party and concentrated its efforts on regional politics, mainly based in the state of North Rhine-Westphalia. The party was unrepresented on the German federal level from 1957 to 2022, when Federal representative Uwe Witt and European representative Jörg Meuthen defected from the AfD and joined the Centre Party. With the former no longer being a member of the party and the latter no longer holding office, the party is once again unrepresented in federal politics.

== Before and during the German Empire ==
=== Origins ===
The Centre Party belongs to the political spectrum of "Political Catholicism" that, emerging in the early 19th century after the turmoil of the Napoleonic wars, had changed the political face of Germany. Many Catholics found themselves in Protestant dominated states.

The first major conflict between the Catholic Church and a Protestant state was the "Colonian Church conflict", when the Prussian government interfered in the question of mixed marriages and the religious affiliation of children resulting from these. This led to serious aggressions against the Catholic population of the Rhineland and Westphalia and culminated in the arrest of the Archbishop of Cologne. At that time, one of the founding fathers of Political Catholicism was journalist Joseph Görres, who called upon Catholics to "stand united" for their common goals, "religious liberty and political and civil equality of the denominations". The conflict relaxed after 1840, with Frederick William IV's accession to the throne.

The German revolutions of 1848–1849 brought new opportunities for German Catholics. In October, the bishops had their first meeting in 40 years in Würzburg and the local "Catholic Federations" assembled in Mainz to found the "Catholic Federation of Germany". In the National Assembly, which was convened to draw up a German constitution, a "Catholic club" was formed. This was not yet a comprehensive party, but a loose union aimed at protecting the Church's liberties in a future Germany, supported by many petitions from the "[Pope] Pius federations for religious liberty". The later demise of the National Assembly proved to be a major setback for Political Catholicism.

In the Kingdom of Prussia, the revised constitution of 1850 granted liberties, which in parts even exceeded those of the Frankfurt draft constitution, yet two years later the minister for culture, von Raumer, issued decrees directed mainly against the Jesuits. In reaction this led to a doubling of Catholic representatives in the subsequent elections and the formation of a Catholic club in the Landtag of Prussia. In 1858, when the "New Era" governments of Wilhelm I adopted more lenient policies, the club renamed itself "Fraction of the Centre" in order to open itself up to include non-Catholics. This name stemmed from the fact that in the Landtag the Catholic representatives were seated in the centre, between the Conservatives on the right and the Liberals on the left. Faced with military and constitutional issues, where there was no definite Church position, the group soon disintegrated and disappeared from parliament after 1867.

=== Soest programme and founding ===
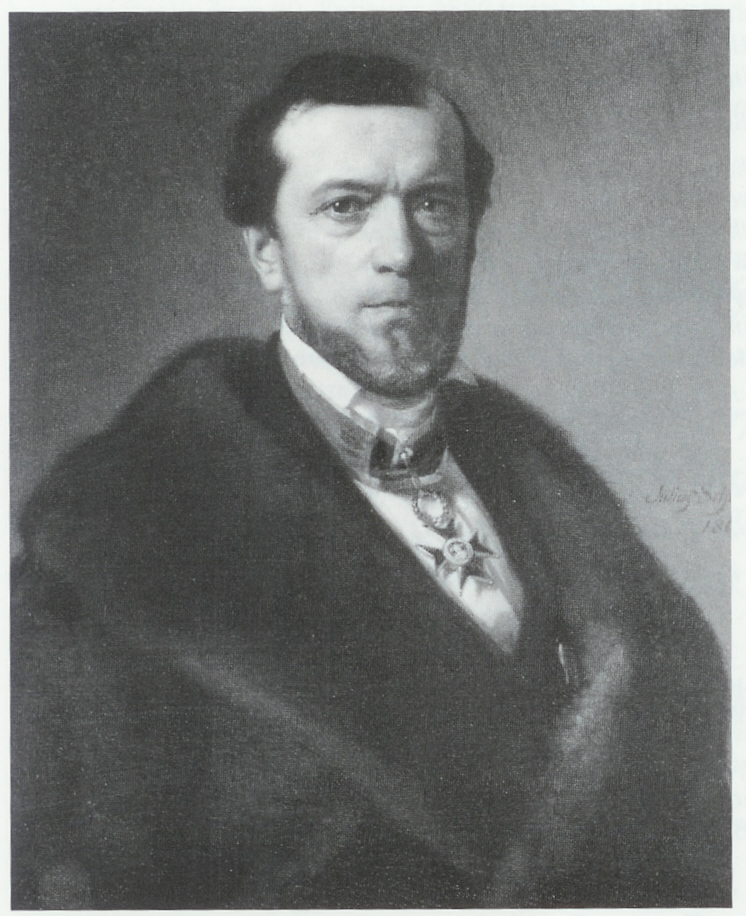
Peter Reichensperger

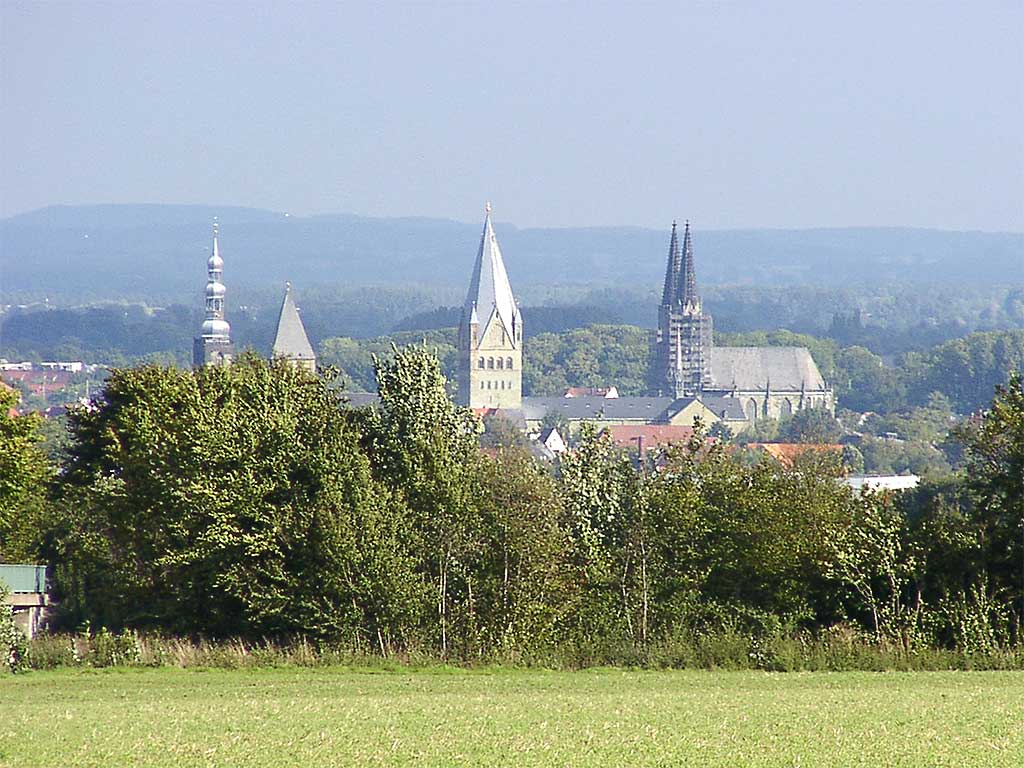
View of Soest

The official flag of the Centre Party between 1870 and 1933

Growing anti-Catholic sentiment and policies, including plans for dissolving all monasteries in Prussia, made it clear that a reorganisation of the group was urgently needed in order to protect Catholic minority rights, enshrined in the 1850 constitution, and to bring them over to the emerging nation state.

In June 1870, Peter Reichensperger called on Catholics to unite and, in October, priests, representatives of Catholic federations and the Catholic gentry met at Soest and drew up an election programme. The main points were:

- Preservation of the Church's autonomy and rights, as accepted by the constitution. Defence against any attack on the independence of Church bodies, on the development of religious life and on the practice of Christian charity.
- Effectual implementation of parity for recognised denominations.
- Rejection of any attempt to de-Christianise marriage.
- Preservation or founding of denominational schools.

There were also more general demands such as for a more federal, decentralised state, a limitation of state expenditure, a just distribution of taxes, the financial strengthening of the middle classes and the legal "removal of such evil states, that threaten the worker with moral or bodily ruin". With such a manifesto, the number of Catholic representatives in the Prussian Diet rose considerably. In December 1870, they formed a new "Centre" faction, also called the "Constitution Party" to emphasise its adherence to constitutional liberties.

Three months later, early in 1871, the Catholic representatives to the new national parliament, the Reichstag, also formed a "Centre" faction. The party not only defended the Church's liberties, but also supported representative government and minority rights in general, in particular those of German Poles, Alsatians, and Hannoverians. The Centre's main leader was the Hannoverian advocate Ludwig Windthorst and other major figures included Karl Friedrich von Savigny, Hermann von Mallinckrodt, Burghard Freiherr von Schorlemer-Alst, the brothers August Reichensperger and Peter Reichensperger, Franz von Ballestrem and Georg Count Hertling. The party was named the Centre Party due to the fact that in Parliament the Catholics sat between the Liberals on the left and the Conservatives on the right as opposed to the party adhering to centrism in the modern context.

Also in other German states Catholic parties were formed, cooperating with the Prussian Centre Party in the Reichstag:

- in Bavaria, the "Bavarian Patriotic Party", with a particularistic-conservative bent, since 1887 called the "Bavarian Centre".

The Catholic People's Party was formed in the Grand Duchy of Baden in 1869, and merged into the Centre Party in 1888.

=== Kulturkampf ===
In the age of nationalism, Protestant Germans, whether Conservative (like Otto von Bismarck) or Liberal, accused the Centre of Ultramontanism or having a greater loyalty towards the Pope than to the German nation. After the First Vatican Council, Bismarck launched the Kulturkampf ("cultural struggle") against the Catholic Church. Catholics fought back vigorously and with near-unanimity. The Centre party gained greater support from the Catholic population. Following Bismarck's 1879 turn from free trade to protectionism and from the National Liberal party to the Conservative parties, he also abandoned the unsuccessful Kulturkampf. The Centre party remained a party of opposition to Bismarck, but after his resignation in 1890, it frequently supported the following administrations' policies in the Reichstag, particularly in the field of social security.

=== Attempts to broaden appeal beyond Catholics ===
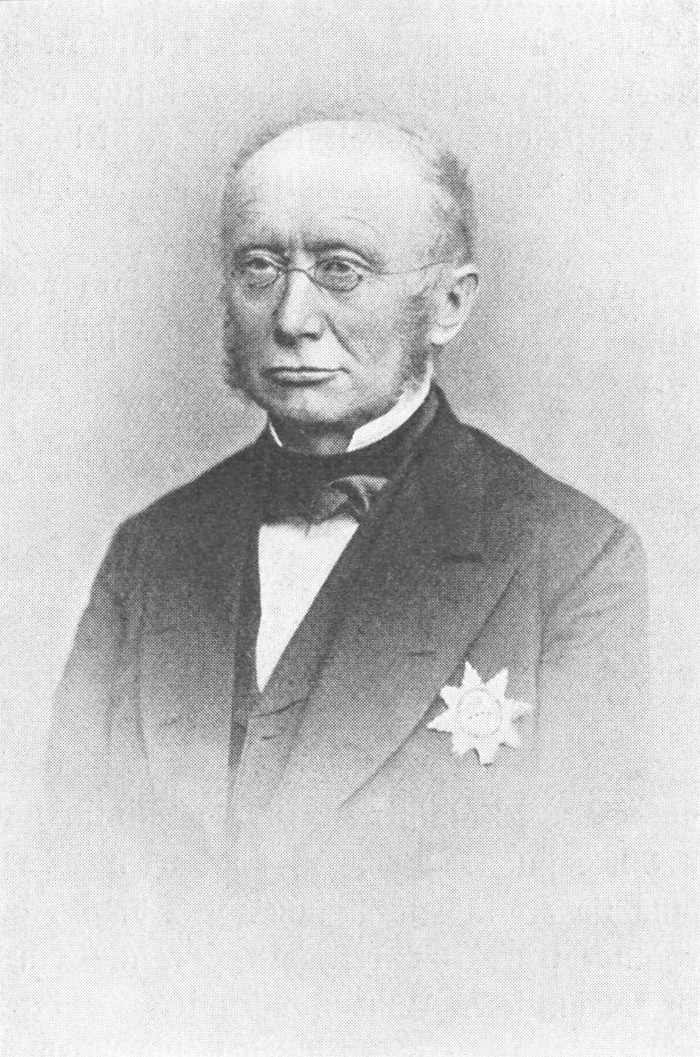
Ludwig Windthorst, leader of the party 1874-1891

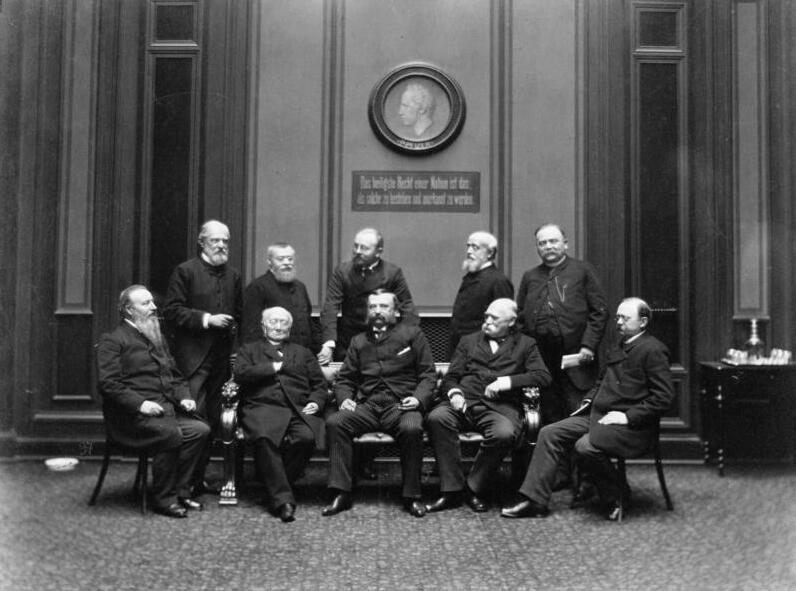
Centre Party Member of Reichstag (first line sitting from left to right: Paul Letocha, Dr. Ludwig Windthorst, Graf v. Johann Anton von Chamaré, Anton von Dejanicz-Gliszczynski, Albert Horn second line-standing-left to right: Graf v. Friedrich von Praschma, Philipp Schmieder (not Centre party), Dr. Felix Porsch, Dr. Frhr. Clemens Heereman von Zuydwyck, Julius Szmula)

The Kulturkampf had reinforced the Catholic character of the Centre Party, but even during it Ludwig Windthorst had defended the party against Bismarck's accusation of being a "denominational party" in describing the Centre as "a political party with a comprehensive political programme and open to anyone, who accepts it". However, few Protestants took up this offer and the Centre remained, by the composition of its members, politicians and voters, an essentially Catholic party.

Loyal to the Pope in church matters, the Centre party steered a course independent of the Holy See on secular matters. This became apparent in the "septennat dispute" of 1886. Since the Centre Party rejected Bismarck's military budget, the Chancellor negotiated with the Holy See and promised to abolish some Kulturkampf-related laws and to support the Pope in the Roman question, if the Vatican persuaded the Centre Party to accept his bill. Despite this agreement, the Centre Party rejected the budget and Bismarck called new elections. He also published the letters with the Vatican, intending to drive a wedge between Catholic voters loyal to the Pope and the Centre Party with the slogan: "The Pope against the Centre!" Windhorst managed to avert this by reaffirming the Party's autonomy, which the Pope had accepted, and by interpreting the published letters as expressions of papal confidence in the party.

As the Kulturkampf declined, debates about the character of the party emerged culminating in the Centre dispute, in 1906, after Julius Bachem had published the article "We must get out of the tower!" He called upon Catholic politicians to fulfill Windthorst's word and get out of their perpetual minority position by an effort to increase Protestant numbers among their representatives in parliament. His proposal was met with passionate opposition by the greater part of Catholic public, especially since it also included the Christian trade unions and other Catholic organisations. No side could win the upper hand, when the outbreak of World War I ended the dispute.

After the war, there were many proposals on how the reform the party. Heinrich Brauns published the Cologne Program (Kölner Programm), which proposed the re-formation of the Zentrum under a new name (Christliche Volkspartei, CVP). This proposal was rejected, with only a few regions adopting it for the 1919 election; the party instead adopted the Berlin Guidelines (Berliner Leitsätze), which were more moderate but failed at making the Zentrum attractive for Protestant voters too. Adam Stegerwald, leader of the Christian trade unions, made another attempt at transcending the party's exclusively Catholic character and uniting Germany's fragmented party spectrum. In 1920 he advocated the formation of a broad Christian middle-party, that would transcend denominations and social classes and which could push back the Social Democrats' influence.

The Polish minority in the German Empire formed one of the largest Catholic groups, but the Centre Party pursued an anti-Polish course causing enmity between it and Polish minority.

=== In war and revolution ===
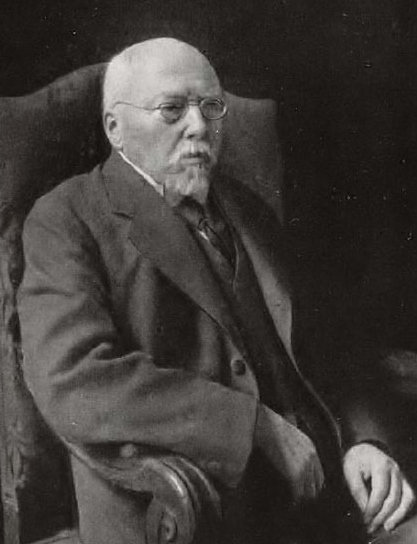
Georg von Hertling, Chancellor of Germany (1 November 1917–30 September 1918)

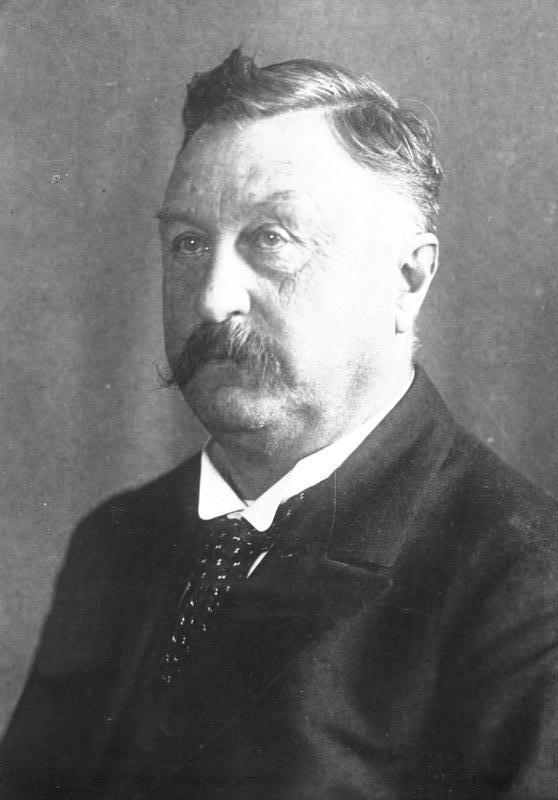
Constantin Fehrenbach, President of the Reichstag (1918) and the Weimar National Assembly (1919–1920), Chancellor of Germany (1920–1921)

With the German entry into World War I, the party also used the debates about war bonds to push for a repeal of the last remnants of anti-Jesuit laws. In 1916, the Reichstag adopted a resolution introduced by the Centre Party, calling on the government to follow the Oberste Heeresleitung (OHL)'s recommendation on the use of submarines. The OHL's policy of resuming unrestricted submarine warfare was supposed to break the deadlock of the war but instead led to the United States entry into the war. As the war continued, many of the leaders of the Centre's left wing, particularly Matthias Erzberger, came to support a negotiated settlement, and Erzberger was key in the passage of the Reichstag Peace Resolution of 1917.

The same year, the Centre's Georg von Hertling, formerly Minister-President of Bavaria, was appointed Chancellor, but he could not overcome the dominance of the military leadership of Hindenburg and Ludendorff. When a parliamentary system of government was introduced in October 1918, the new chancellor Max von Baden appointed representatives from the Centre party, the Social Democrats and the left-liberals as ministers.

After the fall of the monarchy in the German Revolution of 1918–1919, conflict arose between the party and the new Social Democratic government. Adolf Hofmann, the Free State of Prussia minister for culture, attempted to decree a total separation of church and state, forcing religion out of schools. This stirred up a wave of protest among the Catholic population, and bishops, Catholic organisations and the Centre Party itself united to combat the "red danger". This conflict bridged internal tensions within the party and secured its continual existence despite the turmoil of the revolution. The party however was weakened by its Bavarian wing splitting off and forming the Bavarian People's Party (BVP), which emphasised autonomy of the states and also took a more conservative course.

In the 1919 elections for the Weimar National Assembly, the Centre Party gained 91 representatives, being the second largest party after the Social Democratic Party (SPD). The Centre's Constantin Fehrenbach was elected president of the National Assembly. The party actively cooperated with Social Democrats and left-liberal German Democratic Party (DDP) in drawing up the Weimar Constitution, which guaranteed what the Centre had been fighting for since its founding: equality for Catholics and autonomy for Catholic Church throughout Germany. The party was less successful in the school question. Although religious education remained an ordinary subject in most schools, the comprehensive, inter-denominational schools became default.

== Weimar Republic and Nazi Germany ==
=== In the Weimar Republic ===
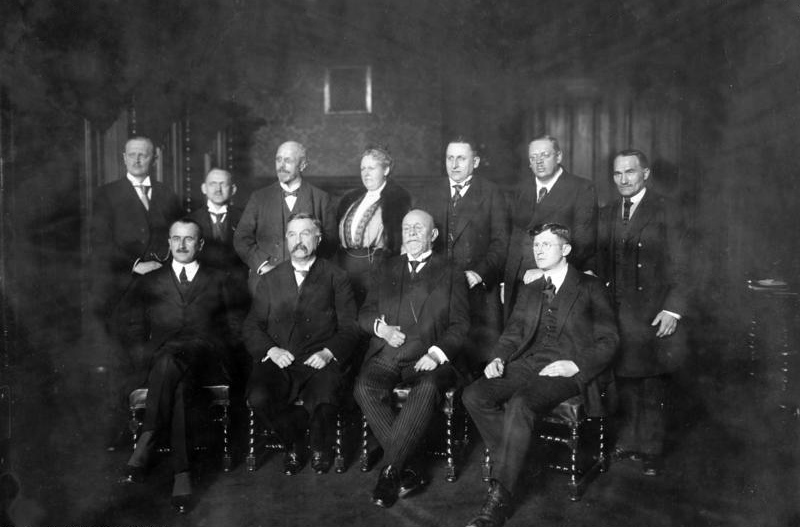
Presidium of the Zentrum, 1920, amongst others Aloys Löwenstein-Wertheim; Constantin Fehrenbach; Helene Drießen; Felix Porsch; Wilhelm Elfes; Sebastian Bauer; Lorenz Blank

The Centre Party, whose pragmatic principles generally left it open to supporting either a monarchical or republican form of government, proved one of the mainstays of the Weimar Republic, continuing the cooperation with SPD and DDP in the Weimar Coalition. This combination, however, lost its majority in the 1920 elections. The formation of the new Christian People's Party in Rhineland (May 1920) caused considerable concern among the Centre leadership. Seeing the exodus of conservative Catholics caused by a sharp left turn of the Centre at the end of war, Adam Stegerwald proposed his "Essen program" (September 1920) that promised Germany to become "Christian, democratic, German, and social" and a plan to form a broad-based Christian party.

The party was an ideologically diverse coalition of Catholic politicians, comprising republicans like Matthias Erzberger and Joseph Wirth as well as right-wingers like Franz von Papen. As a result of the party's flexibility, it participated in every government between 1919 and 1932, both with parties to their left and to their right. The Centre mainly provided the ministers for finance and labour and, on four occasions, the Chancellor. However, this also damaged the party's prospects because it was increasingly associated with all of the conflicts, problems, and failures of the Republic. The Centre had a share of the odium attached to the so-called "Weimar Establishment" which was blamed, especially on the right, for the German defeat in World War I in the Stab-in-the-back myth, as well as for the humiliations of the Versailles Treaty and reparations. Erzberger himself, who had signed the armistice, was assassinated by right-wing extremists in 1921.

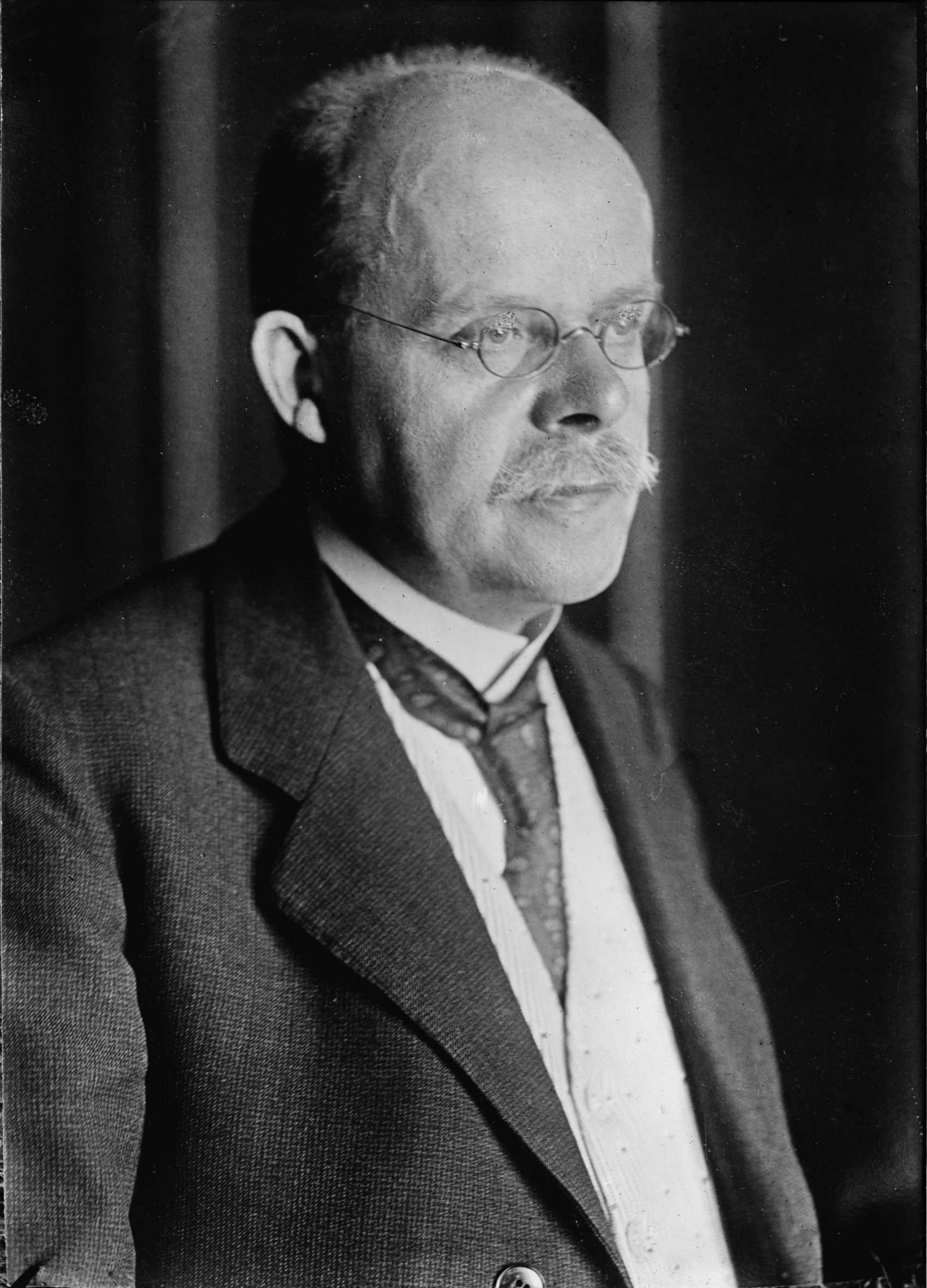
Wilhelm Marx, Chancellor of Germany (1923–1925, 1926–1928)

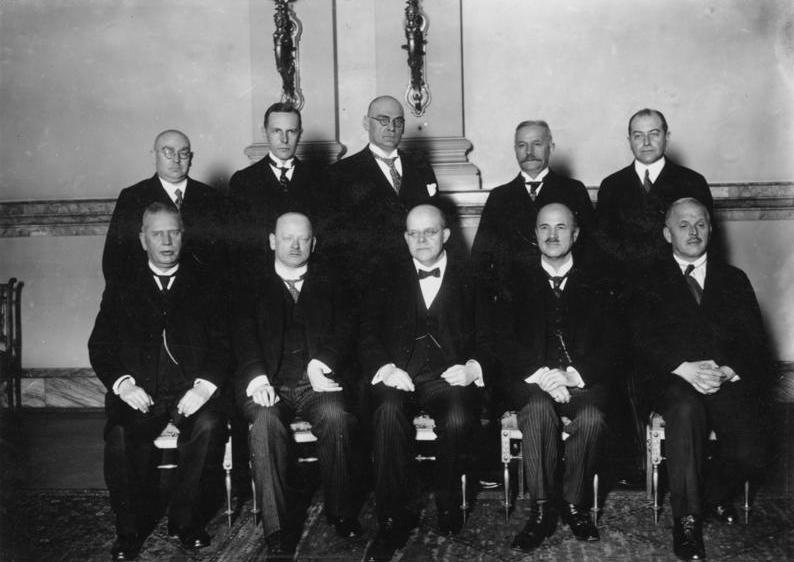
Cabinet with Chancellor Wilhelm Marx, 1927

The parties of the Weimar Coalition (Social Democrats, Centre and the left-liberal German Democratic Party (DDP)) were the base of the Weimar Republic but lost their majority in the 1920 elections. After this, majority governments were rare as they required the support of the Weimar Coalition and the national liberal German People's Party (DVP). Social Democrats and DVP found it hard to agree on economic policy while Social Democrats disagreed with the Centre Party on issues like religious schools or a nationwide Concordat with the Holy See.

Following the 1920 elections, the Centre's Constantin Fehrenbach formed a minority government in a coalition with the DDP and the DVP. In May 1921 the Weimar Coalition once again joined forces with the Centre's Joseph Wirth as Chancellor, but this minority government collapsed again in November 1922. After this, the Centre participated in the non-affiliated Wilhelm Cuno's "government of the economy", together with both liberal parties and the Bavarian People's Party (BVP).

In August 1923, the DVP's Gustav Stresemann formed a Grand Coalition administration, comprising the Centre, both Liberal parties and the Social Democrats, which lasted until November, when the Social Democrats left the coalition and the Centre's Wilhelm Marx became chancellor of a cabinet of the remaining parties. In January 1925 the non-affiliated Hans Luther was appointed chancellor and formed a coalition between the Centre, both Liberal parties, the BVP and, for the first time, the right-wing German National People's Party (DNVP). The Centre, the BVP and the DNVP jointly supported legislation to expand religious schools.

In the same year, Wilhelm Marx was the Centre's candidate in the presidential elections. In the second round, combining the support of the Weimar coalition parties, he gained 45.3% of the vote and finished a close second to the victorious right-wing candidate Paul von Hindenburg with 48.3%. In May 1926 Chancellor Luther resigned and Marx again assumed the chancellorship. In June 1928, the general elections resulted in losses for the government parties and in gains for the Social Democrats and the Communists. The Grand Coalition of 1923 was revived, this time including the BVP and the Social Democrat Hermann Müller became chancellor.

During the years of the Weimar Republic, debates about the Catholic character of the party, as described above, persisted. The left wing of the party, led by Erzberger and Wirth, had close ties to the Catholic workers' associations led by Joseph Joos. Some politicians on the right wing of the party, including Heinrich Brauns and Franz von Papen, advocated a move towards the right and a closer cooperation with the national movements. The middle-ground emphasised their loyalty to the Church and rejected both extremes. To mediate the tension between the wings and to strengthen their ties with the Bishops, the party in September 1928 did not elect the two favourites Joseph Joos and Adam Stegerwald, but rather the cleric Ludwig Kaas as chairman.

During the Weimar period, the Centre Party and presided over legislation of a reformist nature, with its social policies influenced by its labour wing. As one study has noted

The reinforced labour faction of the party initially accorded a more left-wing orientation and facilitated the cooperation with the social democrats. Typically, the Zentrum defended anti-capitalist policies and promoted social policy, but never agreed with social democrats on the right to private property.

By the late Twenties, however, the Center Party gradually returned to more conservative policies.

=== Brüning administration ===
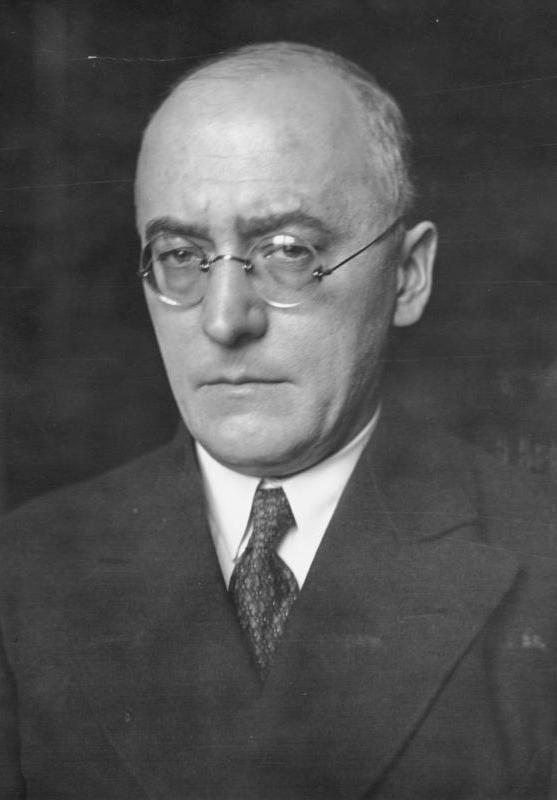
Heinrich Brüning, Chancellor of Germany (1930-1932)

In 1930, the Grand Coalition fell apart. Heinrich Brüning, from the moderate-conservative wing of the party, was appointed as Chancellor with a cabinet that, apart from the missing Social Democrats, was virtually unchanged. Brüning was confronted with economic crises exacerbated by the Great Depression and had to tackle the difficult tasks of consolidating both budget and currency when faced with rising unemployment, and of also negotiating changes to the war reparations payments. His course of strict budget discipline, with severe cuts in public expenditure, and tax increases made him extremely unpopular among the lower and middle classes as well as among the Prussian Junkers.

In 1930, Brüning's failure to gain a majority for his policies in parliament prompted him to call early elections, in which the four parties of the former Grand coalition lost their majority. After this, Brüning based his administration entirely on the support of the presidential decrees ("Notverordnung") through article 48 of the Constitution. This allowed him to circumvent parliament, as long as the Social Democrats - who feared another election - tolerated this practice. For this way of government based on both the President and cooperation of parliament, Brüning coined the term "authoritarian democracy".

By this time, the party had become increasingly ambivalent toward democracy. Many elements of the party, including Kaas, had come to believe that only an authoritarian regime could protect the position of the Church.

The Centre consistently supported Brüning's government and in 1932 vigorously campaigned for the re-election of Paul von Hindenburg, calling him a "venerate historical personality" and "the keeper of the constitution". Hindenburg was re-elected against Adolf Hitler, but shortly afterwards dismissed Brüning on 30 May 1932.

President Hindenburg, advised by General Kurt von Schleicher, appointed the Catholic nobleman Franz von Papen as Chancellor, a member of the Centre's right wing and former cavalry captain. The intention was to break the connection of the Centre with the other republican parties or to split the party and integrate it into a comprehensive conservative movement. However, the Centre refused to support Papen's government in any way and criticised him for "distorting and abusing good old ideals of the Centre, acting as the representative of reactionary circles". Papen forestalled being expelled by leaving the party.

=== Between coup d'état and authoritarian democracy ===
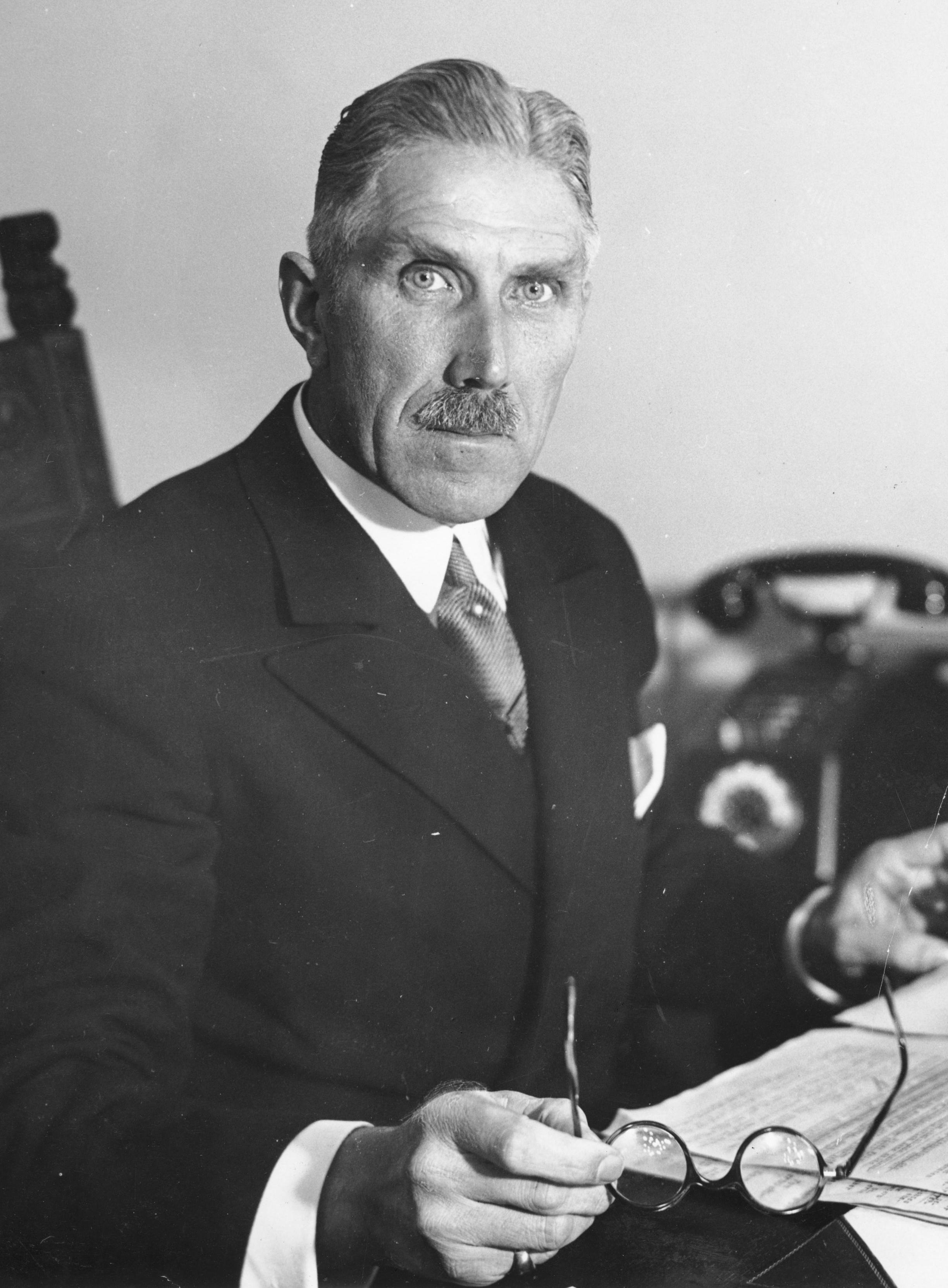
Franz von Papen, Chancellor of Germany (1932)

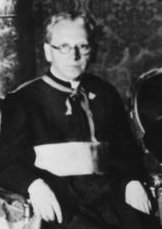
Ludwig Kaas, leader of the Centre Party

Following Brüning's resignation, the Centre Party entered the opposition. Though they also opposed the Nazi Party, their energies were directed mainly against the renegade Papen. Some Centre politicians were soothed by Hitler's strategy of legality into downplaying the Nazi threat.

In regard to the government, the Centre Party rejected a "temporal solution", such as Papen's presidial cabinets, and rather advocated a "total solution", i.e., a government according to the rules of the constitution. Since the Centre considered Papen's administration of being "in a dangerous way dependent on radical right-wing parties", chairman Ludwig Kaas advised the President to recognise this connection by basing the government on a coalition with the rising right-wing parties, the "logical result of current development". This would force the radicals to "take their share in responsibility" and "acquainting them with international politics". The Centre would then act as the party of opposition to this administration.

As Papen was faced with almost uniform opposition by the parties, he had the Reichstag dissolved. In the subsequent elections, the Centre Party campaigned on two fronts, against both the Papen government and National Socialists and reaffirmed their stance as the "constitution party" opposed to "any measure contrary to constitution, justice and law" and "unwilling to yield to terror". The July 1932 elections brought further losses to the mainstream parties and gains to the extremist parties. The National Socialists supplanted the Social Democrats as the largest party in the Reichstag.

As Communists and National Socialists together had won the majority of seats, no government coalition could be formed without one of them. Papen tried to justify his authoritarian style of government by pointing out that parliament could no longer function properly. Countering this reasoning, the Centre and the BVP tried to re-establish a working parliament by cooperation with the National Socialists, since the three parties together had attained 53% of the seats. When Papen called upon the people to "reject the dictatorship of a single party", the Centre Party agreed "without reservation", but it also stated that "with the same resolution we reject the dictatorship of the nameless party, now in power … even if cloaked with the illusion of non-partisanship".

After Papen failed to get Hitler's support for his administration, the Centre began their own negotiations with the National Socialists. They started in the state of Prussia, where the Weimar Coalition had just lost its majority. An alternative majority could not be found and the Papen administration had seized this opportunity to assume control of Germany's largest state in the "Prussian coup" via presidential decree. Now, the National Socialists proposed to end this direct rule by forming a coalition with the Centre Party, promising an equal share in government. Since this went too far for the Centre's national leadership, the negotiations were transferred to the national level, where Heinrich Brüning conferred with Gregor Strasser. During that period the anti-Nazi polemics ceased in order not to disturb the negotiations. Since the NSDAP was the larger party, the Centre was willing to accept a Nazi as Chancellor, provided he could gain the trust of the President, which at that time seemed quite a difficult task.

The negotiations were bound for failure, since the aims of the two groups were largely incompatible. The Centre argued that the vote of July had "called Hitler not to dictatorship but to responsibility, to getting in line with law and constitution". They hoped to "build a strong government without touching the substance of the constitution", to create "clear responsibilities" and to "preclude anti-constitutional experiments". The Centre advocated a return to Brüning's "authoritarian democracy", which they considered up to the times and tested by experience, against Papen's "omnipotent state and independent leadership", while the Nazis would only accept a coalition that would serve their purpose of achieving total dominance. Not expecting a successful conclusion, Hitler used the Centre negotiations in order to put pressure on the Papen administration.

The negotiations were also met with criticism from within the Centre Party. Some rejected them as "currying favour with the National Socialists" and giving credence to Hitler's strategy of legality. Catholic journalists Fritz Gerlich and Ingbert Naab dismissed as "illusionary" the attempt to "uphold the constitution and the legal order" with a man such as Hitler with his "unconditional propensity to evil". Instead of "driving out the devil by Belzebub", the Centre should act as the parliament's conscience. The party leadership answered their critics by calling it a "duty of conscience" to try to achieve a constitutional government. Though Papen did not expect the negotiations to succeed, he was nonetheless concerned as a success would have led to a presidential crisis, as Hindenburg was unwilling to have a coalition parties dictate the administration. In September he ended all speculations by dissolving the Reichstag again, almost immediately after its first meeting.

Papen's act did not end the negotiations between the Centre and the NSDAP. In fact, it made further meetings possible, since the Centre Party's leadership blamed the failure not on the parties' incompatibility but on Papen calling for new elections. Since the NSDAP vote dropped again in the elections of November 1932, the Centre Party considered their strategy successful and resumed negotiations, this time under the slogan of forming a "Notgemeinschaft" ("community of need"), even though the Centre, BVP, and NSDAP together no longer formed a majority in parliament.

Kaas advised President Hindenburg not to continue Papen's "administration of conflict"; he advocated "national concentration including the National Socialists", but did not comment on an alternative Chancellor, since he considered that the "personal prerogative of the President". Hindenburg's negotiations with Hitler failed, but so did Kaas's attempt to form a coalition in parliament. By avoiding a clear statement, Hitler managed to pin the blame for this failure on the DNVP's Alfred Hugenberg, who had rejected Kaas's proposals.

Since the cabinet had refused to support Papen's planned coup d'état by a permanent dissolution of the Reichstag, in December Hindenburg appointed General Kurt von Schleicher as Chancellor. Schleicher tried to form a "Querfront" (an alliance involving willing members of both left-wing and right-wing parties), which failed. Schleicher then revived Papen's proposed coup d'état, which the Centre Party refused to condone, as did the other parties. Under these circumstances, Hindenburg refused to back the coup, and Schleicher accordingly resigned on 28 January 1933.

=== Hitler government and new elections ===
Meanwhile, Papen had formed an intrigue to oust his successor. He conferred with Hugenberg and industrial magnates and bankers during a feverish night in which the outcome was unclear to all participants. On 30 January 1933 Hitler was appointed Chancellor with Papen as Vice-Chancellor and Hugenberg as minister for economics.

Though seeing their adversaries Papen and Hugenberg join forces with Hitler, the Centre Party still did not give up building a broad coalition government. Since the new administration was still lacking a majority in parliament, the Centre was ready to support it, either by toleration or by coalition. Hitler intended to minimise non-Nazi participation, but feigned a willingness to cooperate with the Centre and blamed Papen and Hugenberg for denying cabinet posts to the Centre. When Kaas requested a broad outline of his government's objectives, Hitler used the questionnaire presented by Kaas to declare the talks a failure and obtain the President's approval for calling for new elections for the third time in about half a year.

These elections in March 1933 were already marred by the SA's terror, after the Reichstag fire and civil rights had been suspended by President Hindenburg through the Reichstag Fire Decree. Still the Centre Party campaigned hard against the Hitler administration and managed to preserve their former vote of roughly 11 per cent. The government parties NSDAP and DNVP however jointly won 52 per cent of the vote. This result shattered the Centre Party's hopes of being indispensable for obtaining a majority in parliament. The party was now faced with two alternatives – either to persist in protesting and risk reprisals like Communists and Social Democrats, or to declare their loyal cooperation, in order to protect their members. As shown by subsequent events, though deeply uncomfortable with the new government, the party opted for the latter alternative.

=== Enabling Act of 1933 ===
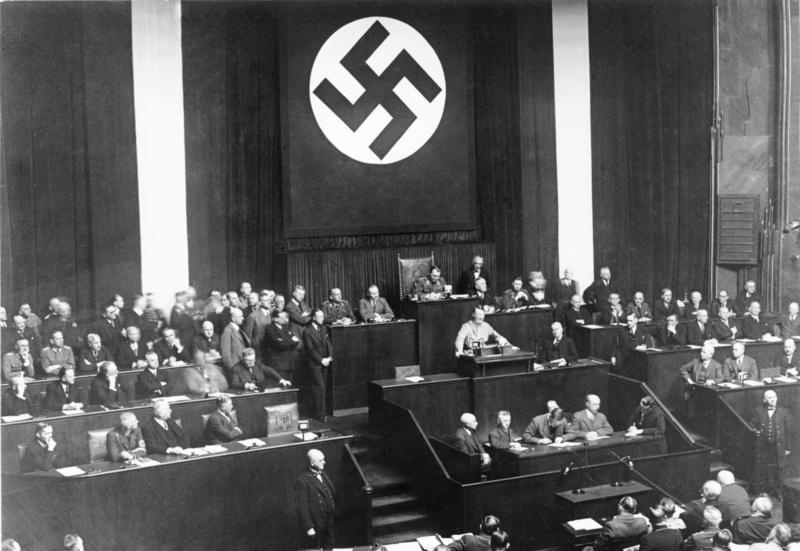
Hitler's Reichstag speech promoting the Enabling Act of 1933, delivered at the Kroll Opera House, following the Reichstag fire

The government confronted the newly elected Reichstag with the Enabling Act of 1933 that would have vested the government with legislative powers for a period of four years. As the bill required a two-thirds majority in order to pass and the coalition parties only controlled 340 of the 647 seats (52.5 percent), the government needed the support of other parties.

The Centre Party, whose vote was going to be decisive, was split on the issue of the Enabling Act. Chairman Kaas advocated supporting the bill in parliament in return for government guarantees. These mainly included respecting the President's Office retaining veto power, religious liberty, its involvement in culture, schools and education, the concordats signed by German states and the existence of the Centre Party. Via Papen, Hitler responded positively and personally addressed the issues in his Reichstag speech but he repeatedly put off signing a written letter of agreement.

Kaas was aware of the doubtful nature of such guarantees but when the Centre Party assembled on 23 March to decide on their vote, Kaas advised his fellow party members to support the bill, given the "precarious state of the party". He described his reasons as follows: "On the one hand we must preserve our soul, but on the other hand a rejection of the Enabling Act would result in unpleasant consequences for fraction and party. What is left is only to guard us against the worst. Were a two-thirds majority not obtained, the government's plans would be carried through by other means. The President has acquiesced in the Enabling Act. From the DNVP no attempt of relieving the situation is to be expected."

According to English historian Richard J. Evans, the main reason why the Centre Party voted for the Enabling Act despite questioning the sincerity of Hitler's guarantees was because of the intimidation that it was subjected to. The party was further pressured by the fact that on 26 June 1933, all of the Reichstag and Landtag deputies of the Bavarian People's Party were placed in custody by Heinrich Himmler. This was also followed by the Nazi troops forcefully disbanding the Catholic trade unions, and Catholic civil servants being threatened with dismissals. In light of the increasing oppression, most members of the Centre Party believed that they were powerless to prevent the NSDAP from gaining power. Evan wrote:

Yet the party wanted a Concordat not least because of the massive intimidation to which it had been subjected since the end of February 1933. This included violent attacks on Centre Party meetings during campaigning for the elections of 5 March 1933, during one of which the Centre Party politician and former government minister Adam Stegerwald was severely beaten by Nazi stormtroopers (on 22 February). One after another in the spring and early summer of 1933, Catholic lay organisations were being forcibly closed down or merged with their Nazi counterparts, Catholic journalists and newspaper editors were arrested, especially if they had attacked the Nazi-led coalition government in print, and leading Catholics were brutally mistreated by the SA. (...) Not surprisingly, it was fear of the complete destruction of its lay organisations and the reversal of all the progress that Catholic laymen had made towards gaining equality of status with Protestants that provided the major impetus behind the agreement of the Centre to dissolve itself in return for a Concordat in which the new regime would commit itself – with how little sincerity would soon become apparent – to preserving the integrity of the Catholic community and its institutions.

— Richard J. Evans, The Third Reich in History and Memory, (2015), pp. 87–88

A considerable number of parliamentarians opposed the chairman's course, among these former Chancellors Heinrich Brüning, Joseph Wirth and former minister Adam Stegerwald. Brüning called the Act the "most monstrous resolution ever demanded of a parliament" and was sceptical about Kaas's efforts: "The party has difficult years ahead, no matter how it would decide. Sureties for the government fulfilling its promises have not been given. Without a doubt, the future of the Centre Party is in danger and once it is destroyed it cannot be revived again."

The opponents also argued that Catholic social teaching ruled out participating in acts of revolution. The proponents argued that a "national revolution" had already occurred with Hitler's appointment and the presidential decree suspending civil rights. The Enabling Act would contain the revolutionary forces and move the government back to a legal order. Both groupings were not unaffected by Hitler's self-portrayal as a moderate seeking cooperation as opposed to the more revolutionary SA led by Ernst Röhm. Even Brüning thought it would be "decisive which groups of the NSDAP will be in power in the future. Will Hitler's power increase or will he fail, that is the question."

In the end the majority of Centre parliamentarians supported Kaas's proposal. Brüning and his followers agreed to respect party discipline by also voting in favour of the bill. The Reichstag assembled under turbulent circumstances. SA men served as guards and crowded outside the building to intimidate any opposition while the Communist and some Social Democratic members of the Reichstag had been imprisoned and were thus prevented from voting. In the end, the Centre voted as planned in favour of the Enabling Act, as did all the other parties apart from the SPD. The act was passed on 23 March 1933.

=== End of the party ===
The passing of the Enabling Act did not, as Kaas had suggested, prevent the Centre Party's demise. As promised during the negotiations, a working committee chaired by Hitler and Kaas was supposed to inform about further legislative measures. However, it met only three times (31 March, 2 and 7 April) without any major impact. At that time, the Centre Party was weakened by massive defections by party members. Loyal party members, in particular civil servants, and other Catholic organisations were subject to increasing reprisals, despite Hitler's previous guarantees. The party was also hurt by a declaration of the German bishops that, while maintaining their opposition to Nazi ideology, modified the ban on cooperation with the new authorities.

The issue of the concordat prolonged Kaas's stay in Rome, leaving the party without an effective chairman: On 5 May Kaas finally resigned from his post and the party now elected Brüning as his successor. The party adopted a tempered version of the leadership principle; pro-Centre papers now declared that the party's members, or "retinue", would fully submit itself to Brüning. It was not enough, however, to relieve the growing pressure that it and other parties faced in the wake of the process of Gleichschaltung. Prominent members were frequently arrested and beaten, and pro-Centre civil servants were fired. As the summer of 1933 wore on, several government officials—including Papen—demanded that the Centre either dissolve or be closed down by the government.

By July, the Centre was the only non-Nazi party that still even nominally existed; the SPD and KPD had been banned outright, while the others had been browbeaten into dissolving themselves. On 1 July, Papen and Kaas agreed that as part of the concordat, German priests would stay out of politics. As it turned out, the party dissolved on 5 July—much to the dismay of Cardinal Pacelli, who felt the party should at least have waited until after the conclusion of negotiations. The day after, the government issued a law outlawing the formation of new political parties, thereby making the NSDAP the only legally permitted party in Germany.

== Refounding and post-war history ==
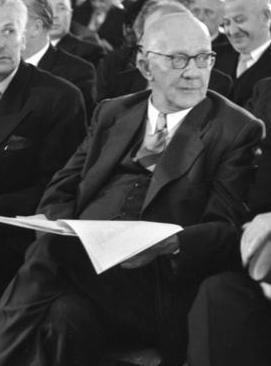
Rudolf Amelunxen, Minister-President of North Rhine-Westphalia (1945–1947)

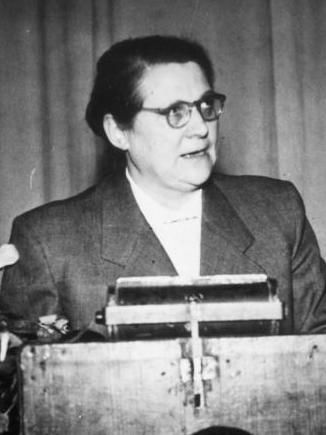
Helene Wessel, leader of the Centre Party (1949–1952)

After the war, the party was refounded, but it was confronted with the emergence of the Christian Democratic Union (CDU), a new party formed as a Christian party comprising both Catholics and Protestants. As many former Centre party politicians, such as Konrad Adenauer, were founding members or joined the CDU, and Cardinal Josef Frings of Cologne endorsed the new party, the party lost its position as the party of the Catholic population. For some time, however, the party managed to hold on to regional strongholds in North Rhine-Westphalia. In 1945, its Rudolf Amelunxen had been the new state's first Minister-President, and it participated in the state government until 1958, when it left the state parliament. Until 1959, the Centre was also represented in the state parliament of Lower Saxony.

On the national level, in the elections of 1949, it won ten seats in the first Bundestag. However, in 1953, the party (with the aid from the regional CDU) only retained three seats. In 1957, largely due to the massive CDU landslide that year, the party dropped out of the Bundestag completely and it did not return until 2022.

This demise is at least partly because of Helene Wessel. In 1949, she was one of the Centre's representatives in the Bundestag and also was elected chairwoman of the party, the first woman ever to lead a German party. In 1951, she vocally opposed Adenauer's policy of West German rearmament and joined forces with the CDU's Gustav Heinemann, the former Minister of the Interior. The two formed the Notgemeinschaft zur Rettung des Friedens in Europa ("Emergency Community to Save the Peace in Europe"), an initiative intended to prevent rearmament. Wessel resigned from her post and in November 1952 left the party. Immediately afterwards, Wessel and Heinemann turned the Notgemeinschaft into a political party, the All-German People's Party (Gesamtdeutsche Volkspartei, GVP), that failed badly in the elections of 1953. In 1957, the GVP dissolved, and most members joined the SPD.

Meanwhile, the survivors of the Centre Party tried to forge an alliance of small parties of Christian persuasion, to offer an alternative to disappointed CDU/CSU voters, but they gained only the support of the Bavaria Party. The two parties joined forces under the name Federal Union, first in parliament since 1951 and in the 1957 the general elections, but the results were disappointing.

In 1988, the right wing of the party split off and formed the "Christian Centre Party". In 2003 the evangelical "Christian Party of Germany" (CPD) joined the Centre Party.

Since its demise on the national level, the party focuses on local politics, while maintaining the same positions as in the post-war period. The party is represented in some city councils in North Rhine-Westphalia and Saxony-Anhalt. Despite its marginal numbers, the party emphasises continuity to its history by sometimes referring to itself as the "oldest political party of Germany". According to its statutes the official name of the party is Deutsche Zentrumspartei – Älteste Partei Deutschlands gegründet 1870 (German Centre Party – Oldest Party in Germany founded in 1870).

=== Small revival ===
The current chairman of the party is Klaus Brall. The party is affiliated with the European Christian Political Party.

In 2022, former Alternative for Germany member Uwe Witt joined the party while still holding his seat in the Bundestag. It is the first time since 1957 that the party has held a seat in the Bundestag. Witt subsequently left in August of the same year.

The party also got its first representation in the European Parliament on 10 June 2022, when the former AfD co-chairman Jörg Meuthen joined the party. However, Meuthen left the party in September 2023.

== Ideology and beliefs ==
Although the party's ideology has shifted throughout its existence, it has consistently presented itself through a Christian democratic and politically Catholic profile. It was seen to occupy the political centre, although the party is considered to have shifted towards the right of centre in early 1930s under the leadership of Ludwig Kaas. The Oxford Handbook of the Weimar Republic argues that while "Until recently, historians considered Kaas to have been an... ominous indication of the Centre’s shift to the right", the party's position was "more nuanced", as it continued to accept the legitimacy of the Weimar Republic and its constitution, and Kaas strove to reconcile both the left-leaning and right-leaning wings of the party.

The party adopted a new program in 2008 in which it stated rejection for the traditional left and right divide of politics and called for a "value-oriented" platform guided by the principles of Christianity and Basic Law for the Federal Republic of Germany. The party supports the traditional family unit and is generally opposed to abortion. It has given support to right to life movements in Germany.

During the Weimar era, the Centre Party was socially and economically heterogenous and included groups of various political views and interests, including republicans and monarchists. It represented the entire "political microcosm of Weimar Catholic society". It included industrial workers and smallholders, broad middle class (including both the agrarian and urban middle classes), as well as entrepreneurs, civil servants and clerics, and lastly a small but influential group of Catholic aristocracy. The uniting element of the factions of the Centre Party was commitment to Political Catholicism. The party also urged union with Austria. The party had a left wing, represented by politicians such as Constantin Fehrenbach, Matthias Erzberger, Joseph Wirth, as well as Catholic workers' associations and trade unions, led by the Centre's laborist politicians such as Adam Stegerwald.

Left-wing factions of the Centre Party were committed to republicanism and pressured the Zentrum to officially identify itself as a pro-republican party; however, the party instead adopted a vague label of being a "constitutional party", which was "ready to collaborate with any legal government". The leftists of the Centre Party also promoted cooperation with the SPD and advised Weimar Catholics to join the Reichsbanner; some left-wing Centre factions were also supportive of cooperation with right-wing nationalist trade unions on pragmatic basis. Along with "republican-democratic" wings of the party, the Centre Party also had socialist factions. Catholic socialism was promoted by politicians such as Heinrich Mertens and Vitus Heller, as well as the Catholic priest Wilhelm Hohoff, who argued that Marx's criticism of capitalism is consistent with Catholic social teaching, and believed that the atheism of socialism "was not an essential ingredient but only a transient phase". The Catholic socialists of the Centre Party presented various positions, such as promoting a "third way" between capitalism and communism based on the papal encyclical Quadragesimo anno, or advocating economical socialism with a strongly religious and socially conservative character, but rejecting the secular currents of socialism and social democracy.

In stark contrast to pro-parliamentary and pro-republican factions of the Centre, there were also anti-republican and anti-democratic factions, which argued that Weimar democracy promoted anti-Catholic values such as secularism, individualism and materialism. The party's right wing was represented by figures such as the cardinal Michael von Faulhaber or Hermann Port, who sought cooperation with conservative parties. Because of the extreme ideological heterogeneity of the party, it simultaneously participated in pro- and anti-republican coalitions on the local level. In attempt to solve internal dissent, the party would increasingly appoint Catholic priests and clerics to leading positions, as opposed to non-clerical politicians associated with certain interest groups within the party. This practice led to the appointment of figures such as Ludwig Kaas in 1928. The party then became subject to the broader shift to the right of the Weimar society in late 1920s caused by the Great Depression and dissatisfaction with the Weimar political system, which also included the Catholic groups.

In an updated policy platform in 2022, the Centre Party declares its objective is to protect the "Christian-Jewish roots of Europe and defend the free-democratic basic order of the Basic Law of the Federal Republic of Germany." The party supports a social market economy, keeping national debt low and strong social security systems. The party supports the integration of immigrants residing legally in Germany while protecting German national identity and ensuring compulsory laws for immigrants to learn German, understand German culture and undergo a values test before acquiring citizenship. It also calls for strong law and order and national security policies to combat violent crime and terrorism and supports German membership of NATO.

== Election results ==
=== German Reichstag/Bundestag ===
| Election year | Constituency | | Party list | | Seats won | +/− |
| Election year | Votes | % | Votes | % | Seats won | +/− |
|---|---|---|---|---|---|---|
| 1867–1868 | 315,777 | 9.6 | | | 36 / 382 | ▲36 |
| 1871 | 724,000 | 18.6 | | | 63 / 382 | ▲37 |
| 1874 | 1,446,000 | 27.9 | | | 91 / 397 | ▲28 |
| 1877 | 1,341,300 | 24.8 | | | 93 / 397 | ▲2 |
| 1878 | 1,328,100 | 23.1 | | | 94 / 397 | ▲1 |
| 1881 | 1,182,900 | 23.2 | | | 100 / 397 | ▲6 |
| 1884 | 1,282,000 | 22.6 | | | 99 / 397 | ▼1 |
| 1887 | 1,516,200 | 20.1 | | | 98 / 397 | ▼1 |
| 1890 | 1,342,100 | 18.6 | | | 106 / 397 | ▲8 |
| 1893 | 1,468,500 | 19.1 | | | 96 / 397 | ▼10 |
| 1898 | 1,455,100 | 18.8 | | | 102 / 397 | ▲6 |
| 1903 | 1,875,300 | 19.8 | | | 100 / 397 | ▼2 |
| 1907 | 2,179,800 | 19.4 | | | 105 / 397 | ▲5 |
| 1912 | 1,996,800 | 16.4 | | | 91 / 397 | ▼14 |
| 1919 | | | 5,980,216 | 19.67 | 91 / 423 | Steady |
| 1920 | | | 3,845,001 | 13.6 | 64 / 459 | ▼27 |
| May 1924 | | | 3,914,379 | 13.4 | 65 / 472 | ▲1 |
| December 1924 | | | 4,118,849 | 13.6 | 69 / 493 | ▲4 |
| 1928 | | | 3,712,152 | 12.1 | 61 / 491 | ▼8 |
| 1930 | | | 4,127,000 | 11.81 | 68 / 577 | ▲7 |
| July 1932 | | | 4,589,430 | 12.44 | 75 / 608 | ▲7 |
| November 1932 | | | 4,230,545 | 11.93 | 70 / 584 | ▼5 |
| March 1933 | | | 4,424,905 | 11.25 | 73 / 647 | ▲3 |
| November 1933 | Banned. National Socialist German Workers Party sole legal party. | | | | | |
| 1936 | Banned. National Socialist German Workers Party sole legal party. | | | | | |
| 1938 | Banned. National Socialist German Workers Party sole legal party. | | | | | |
| 1949 | | | 727,505 | 3.1 | 10 / 402 | ▼63 |
| 1953 | 55,835 | 0.2 | 217,078 | 0.8 | 3 / 509 | ▼7 |
| 1957 (Note: As member of the Federal Union) | 295,533 | 1.0 | 254,322 | 0.9 | 0 / 519 | ▼3 |
| 1961 | did not participate | | | | | |
| 1965 (Note: As member of the Christian People's Party (CVP)) | 11,978 | 0.0 | 19,832 | 0.1 | 0 / 518 | Steady |
| 1969 | — | — | 15,933 | 0.0 | 0 / 518 | Steady |
| 1972 | did not participate | | | | | |
| 1976 | did not participate | | | | | |
| 1980 | did not participate | | | | | |
| 1983 | did not participate | | | | | |
| 1987 | 4,020 | 0.0 | 19,035 | 0.1 | 0 / 519 | Steady |
| 1990 | did not participate | | | | | |
| 1994 | 1,489 | 0.0 | 3,757 | 0.0 | 0 / 672 | Steady |
| 1998 | 2,076 | 0.0 | — | — | 0 / 669 | Steady |
| 2002 | 1,823 | 0.0 | 3,127 | 0.0 | 0 / 603 | Steady |
| 2005 | 1,297 | 0.0 | 4,010 | 0.0 | 0 / 614 | Steady |
| 2009 | 369 | 0.0 | 6,087 | 0.0 | 0 / 622 | Steady |
| 2013 | did not participate | | | | | |
| 2017 | did not participate | | | | | |
| 2021 | did not participate | | | | | |
| 2025 | did not participate | | | | | |

=== Volkstag of Danzig ===
| Election year | Votes | % | Seats won | +/− |
|---|---|---|---|---|
| 1920 | 21,262 | 13.88 | 17 / 120 | ▲17 |
| 1923 | 21,114 | 12.81 | 15 / 120 | ▼2 |
| 1927 | 26,096 | 14.27 | 18 / 120 | ▲3 |
| 1930 | 30,230 | 15.28 | 11 / 72 | ▼7 |
| 1933 | 31,336 | 14.63 | 10 / 72 | ▼1 |
| 1935 | 31,522 | 13.41 | 10 / 72 | Steady |

=== Landesrat of the Territory of the Saar Basin ===
| Election year | Votes | % | Seats won | +/− |
|---|---|---|---|---|
| 1922 | 92,252 | 47.7 | 16 / 30 | – |
| 1924 | 3,246,511 | 42.8 | 14 / 30 | ▼2 |
| 1928 | 129,162 | 46.4 | 14 / 30 | Steady |
| 1932 | 156,615 | 43.2 | 14 / 30 | Steady |

== See also ==
- History of the Centre Party
- List of German Centre Party politicians

== Works cited ==
- Dill, Marshall (1954). "The Christian Trade Unions During the Last Years of Imperial Germany and the First Months of the Weimar Republic". Review of Social Economy. 12 (2). Taylor & Francis, Ltd.: 89–109. doi:10.1080/00346765400000024. ISSN 0034-6764. JSTOR 29767502.
- Grünthal, Günther (1968). Reichsschulgesetz und Zentrumspartei in der Weimarer Republik. Beiträge zur Geschichte des Parlamentarismus und der politischen Parteien (in German). Droste. ISBN 978-3-7700-5056-7.
- Grünthal, Günther (1979). ""Zusammenschluß" oder "Evangelisches Zentrum"? Ein Beitrag zur Geschichte der Deutschen Zentrumspartei in der Weimarer Republik". In Pöls, Werner (ed.). Staat und Gesellschaft im politischen Wandel. Beiträge zur Geschichte der modernen Welt (in German). Stuttgart: Klett Cotta. pp. 301–330. ISBN 9783129119006.
- Mitchell, Maria (2012). "Confessional Conflict in German History". The Origins of Christian Democracy: Politics and Confession in Modern Germany. Social History, Popular Culture, And Politics In Germany. University of Michigan Press. ISBN 978-0-472-02854-2.
- Schmidgall, Markus (2012). Die Revolution 1918/19 in Baden. Karlsruhe Institute of Technology. ISBN 9783866447271.
