= 1932 Saar parliamentary election =

Elections to the consultative Regional Council (Landesrat) were held in the territory of the Saar Basin on 13 February 1932. The Centre Party remained the largest faction, winning 14 of the 30 seats. Peter Scheuer was re-elected as President of the Landesrat.

== Results ==
Party	Votes	%	Seats	+/–
Centre Party	156,615	43.19	14	0
Communist Party	84,112	23.19	8	+3
Social Democratic Party	35,968	9.92	3	–2
Nazi Party	24,455	6.74	2	New
German Saarland People's Party	24,152	6.66	2	–2
German Economy Party of the Middle Classes	11,591	3.20	1	0
Workers' and Farmers' Party of Germany	6,491	1.79	0	–1
German National People's Party	5,776	1.59	0	–1
Communist Party (Opposition)	5,353	1.48	0	New
Otto Fried List	3,434	0.95	0	New
Social Democratic Worker's Party of Germany	2,584	0.71	0	New
German State Party	2,100	0.58	0	0
Total	362,631	100.00	30	0
Valid votes	362,631	98.17		
Invalid/blank votes	6,750	1.83		
Total votes	369,381	100.00		
Registered voters/turnout	477,635	77.34		
Source: Gonschior
