= August Reichensperger =

German politician

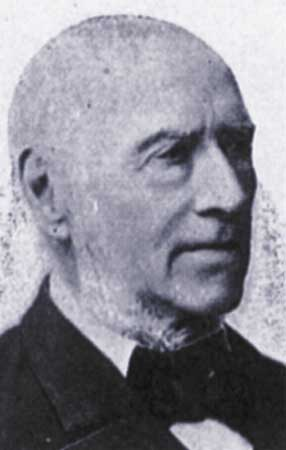
August Reichensperger

August Reichensperger (22 March 1808 – 16 July 1895) was a German Catholic politician from the city of Koblenz.

== Life ==
Reichensperger studied law and entered government service, becoming counsellor to the court of appeal (Appellationsgerichtsrat) at Cologne in 1849. He was a member of the German parliament at Frankfurt in 1848, when he attached himself to the Right, and of the Erfurt Parliament in 1850, when he voted against the Prussian-dominated union of the German states. From 1850 to 1863 he sat in the Prussian Lower House, from 1867 to 1884 in the Reichstag, and from 1879 onwards also in the Prussian Chamber of Deputies.

Originally of liberal tendencies, he developed from 1837 onwards ultramontane opinions, founded in 1852 the Catholic group which in 1861 took the name of the Centre Party and became one of its most conspicuous orators. He died at Cologne.

He published a considerable number of works on art and architecture, including Die christlich-germanische Baukunst (Trier, 1845, 3rd ed., 1860); Fingerzeige auf dem Gebiete der christlichen Kunst (Leipzig, 1854); and Augustus Pugin, der Neubegründer der christlichen Kunst in England (Freiburg, 1877).

His brother, Peter Reichensperger, was also active in German politics.
