= Septennat (France) =

Seven-year presidential term (1870–2002)

Septennat (from Latin septem = "seven" and annus = "year") was the name of the seven-year term of office of the President of France in the Third Republic, in the Fourth Republic and (until 2002) in the Fifth Republic.

In October 2000, the term of office was shortened to five years through a constitutional amendment based on the referendum on September 24, 2000. Since then, the term of office has been called “Quinquennat” (from French cinq or Latin quinque).

By Article 6 of Constitutional Law No. 2008-724 of July 23, 2008, the following paragraph was inserted after Article 6 paragraph 1:

Nul ne peut exercer plus de deux mandats consécutifs.
(No one can hold more than two mandates in a row)

Article 29 of the French Constitution of 1946 read Le président de la République est élu par le Parlement. Il est élu pour sept ans. Il n'est rééligible qu'une fois. (The President of the Republic is elected by Parliament. He is elected for seven years. He can only be re-elected once.)

== See also ==
- Politics of France
- List of political systems in France
- Political history of France
