= Heinrich Mertens =

German politician and Catholic writer (1906–1968)

Heinrich Mertens (6 February 1906 – 16 June 1968) was a German publicist, editor of the magazine The Red Book of Catholic Socialists, and mayor of Halle and Jena.

== Life ==
Born in 1906 in Düsseldorf, Mertens came from Catholic working-class roots in the Rhineland. His father was a steel worker and his mother came from a family of Jewish craftsmen. He was denied access to the Gymnasium for financial reasons. After commercial studies (1919–1922) and about six months in the missionary school of the Franciscan Order in Moresnet in 1923, he headed to Vienna to join the "Herrgottsknechten". These were young Catholics who did social work free of charge while renouncing official titles and organizational structure and leading a consciously modest life. In 1925, Mertens published the book "Ruf zur Wende – Blätter zur katholischen Erneuerung" (Call for a Change - Guide to Catholic Renewal). In Vienna he also joined a group affiliated with Catholic social reformer Anton Orel (1881–1959) publisher of the weekly "Das neue Volk" (The New People). Mertens however came to regard Orel's social-romantic anticapitalism as out-of-date and unsuitable for everyday living and, while preferring socialism to capitalism, nevertheless rejected the materialistic and atheistic elements of Marxist doctrine. Mertens was also repelled by Orel's anti-Semitism.

In 1926, through the intervention of the People's Association for Catholic Germany, Mertens found a position in the mission department of the Düsseldorf office for the Union of Catholic Youth (Katholischen Jungmännervereine). Because of his public support for socialism, he was soon dismissed at the instigation of General-President Ludwig Wolker (1887–1955). He then joined the editorial board of the Social Democratic "Rheinische Zeitung" on the recommendation of Wilhelm Sollmann (1881–1951) and became the editor of the supplement "The Tribune", an ongoing dialogue between Christians and socialists. He likely joined the Social Democratic Party at this time, though he remained a critic.

In 1928 he founded the "Association of Catholic Socialists of Germany" and gave it a voice with the monthly publication "Red Book of Catholic Socialists" (Roten Blatt der katholischen Sozialisten). The association's headquarters was located in Cologne and members came mainly from the ranks of the Social Democrats. Some young chaplains also contributed under pseudonyms. The Red Book, which was published from January 1929 until November / December 1930, had about 1800 subscribers, predominantly Catholic corporations, intellectuals, and Catholic and Protestant theologians. In January 1931, the "Red Book" was merged with the "Newspaper for Religion and Socialism", a voice for Protestant socialists, published by Georg Wünsch in 1929. The publisher was Wünsch, and Heinrich Mertens took the lead.

A prominent member of the association was Ernst Michel, head of the "Academy of Labour" founded by the unions in Frankfurt in 1921. Their goal of combining Catholic faith with socialist thought was, however, achieved only to a limited extent. The Social Democratic Party showed little interest in the organization because it could not demonstrate significant growth in party membership, and on the Catholic side, the 1931 papal encyclical "Quadragesimo anno" emphasized the fundamental incompatibility of Christianity and socialism.

As a scholar supported by the Abraham Lincoln Stiftung (endowed by the Rockefeller Foundation), Mertens studied philosophy, economics, pedagogy and psychology during the summer semester of 1932 in Frankfurt. On the basis of his high examination scores, he was admitted to university in the spring of 1932 without a certificate of matriculation. In the Mainmetropole, he worked especially at the Institute for Social Research, where he also made contacts with Theodor W. Adorno and Max Horkheimer. However, after the Nazi seizure of power in 1933 and the subsequent cancellation of the Lincoln scholarship funds for political reasons, he was forced to leave early.

Later Mertens got a job at the Frankfurter Sender newspaper. While in this position he even joined the Sturmabteilung and hoped vainly for a "second revolution" within National Socialism, of socialists against nationalists.

In February 1936, Mertens was arrested by the Gestapo as part of the trial of the Catholic priest Joseph Rossaint (1902–1991) on the charge of high treason. Mertens was accused of having illegal Marxist ambitions, but he was released again after a month and a half. During the Second World War, Mertens found a job at the office of the Berliner publishing house. He made contact here with various resistance groups and provided assistance to Jews living undercover.

With the end of the war, Heinrich Mertens was appointed mayor of Eisleben by the US armed forces on April 14, 1945, a position which he held until 31 October. He participated in the founding of the Liberal Democratic Party of Germany (LDP). As the LDP candidate he succeeded Theodor Lieser as mayor of Haale, and after the local electoral victory by the Socialist Unity Party of Germany, became on 26 September 1946 the mayor of by Jena. In 1947, he fled with his wife Maria and two daughters to the West. Among other roles, he was a correspondent for Die Welt, head of the press department for the German Trade Union Confederation, employee at Westdeutscher Rundfunk Cologne; publisher of the newspaper "Ost-West-Handel" (East-West Trade). At this time, he was once again active in the SPD. He was close to the future minister president of North Rhine-Westphalia, Heinz Kühn (SPD). He died in 1968 in Austria in a traffic accident.

== Works ==
- (Hrsg.): Das Rote Blatt der katholischen Sozialisten. Jahrgang 1 und 2. Mittelrheinische Druckerei und Verlagsanstalt, Cologne 1929 / Verlag der religiösen Sozialisten, Mannheim 1930. Unveränderter Neudruck: Auvermann, Glashütten im Taunus 1972.
- Katholische Sozialisten. Verlag der religiösen Sozialisten, Mannheim 1930.
- with Heinz Kühn and Walter Dirks: Unvergessene Brückenschläge. Hrsg. vom Zentralausschuß der sozialistischen Bildungsgemeinschaften des Landes NRW. Reddigau, Cologne 1962.

== Articles ==
- "Die Position des katholischen Sozialisten". In: Die Schildgenossen. 8, 1928, Nr. 5, p. 422–434.
- "Das sehen wir – Das wollen wir! Ruf an die Katholiken". In: Das Rote Blatt der katholischen Sozialisten. 1, 1929, Nr. 1, p. 1.
- "Bilanz. Unser Ursprung – Die katholische Kritik – Was wird?" In: Das Rote Blatt der katholischen Sozialisten. 1, 1929, Nr. 11/12, p. 69.
- "Probleme der katholisch-sozialen Bewegung und die Position der katholischen Sozialisten". In: Zeitschrift für Religion und Sozialismus. 2, 1930, p. 20–34.
- "Das Recht und die Aufgabe der katholischen Sozialisten in Kirche und Arbeiterschaft". In: Zeitschrift für Religion und Sozialismus. 2, 1930, p. 351–365.
- "Die Enzyklika 'Quadragesimo anno' und die neueste katholische Sozialismuskritik". In: Zeitschrift für Religion und Sozialismus. 3, 1931, p. 389–397.
- "Stand oder Klasse?" In: Rhein-Mainische Volkszeitung. Nr. 96 vom 26. April 1928, S. 1f. and Nr. 97 vom 27. April 1928, p. 1f.

== Literature ==
- Georg Humbert: Katholiken und religiöse Sozialisten in der Weimarer Zeit – insbesondere Heinrich Mertens, Ernst Michel und das Rote Blatt der katholischen Sozialisten. Unpublished thesis. Bochum 1975.
- Georg Humbert: "Katholische Sozialisten in Weimar. Das Rote Blatt und der Kreis um Ernst Michel und Heinrich Mertens". In: Christ und Sozialist. Publications of the League of Religious Socialists of Germany, e.V., 2nd quarter. Bielefeld 1984, p. 34–40.
- Wolfgang Klein: "Das Rote Blatt der katholischen Sozialisten". In: Jahrbuch für Christliche Sozialwissenschaften. 16, 1975, p. 139–159.
- Klaus Kreppel: "Feuer und Wasser. Katholische Sozialisten in der Weimarer Republik". In: kritischer Katholizismus. Zeitung für Theorie und Praxis in Gesellschaft und Kirche. Früher Rothenfelser Hefte. 4. Jahrgang Köln 1971. Nr. 6, p. 4.
- Ulrich Bröckling: Katholische Intellektuelle in der Weimarer Republik. Zeitkritik und Gesellschaftstheorie bei Walter Dirks, Romano Guardini, Carl Schmitt, Ernst Michel und Heinrich Mertens. Fink, München 1993.
- Andreas Lienkamp: Theodor Steinbüchels Sozialismusrezeption. Eine christlich-sozialethische Relecture. Schöningh, Paderborn, München, Wien, Zürich 2000, p. 275–353.

Preceded by Heinrich Troeger	Mayor of Jena; 1946–1947	Succeeded by Dr. Herdegen
