= 1924 Saar parliamentary election =

- 27 January 1924
- All 30 seats in the Landesrat
Party	Leader	Vote %	Seats	+/–
Centre Party	Peter Scheuer	42.77	14	−2
SPD	Valentin Schäfer	18.43	6	+1
KPD		15.90	5	+3
DSVP		14.85	4	−1
VHL		4.11	1	−1
This lists parties that won seats. See the complete results below.
President of the Landesrat after
Peter Scheuer; Centre Party

Elections to the consultative Regional Council (Landesrat) were held in the Territory of the Saar Basin on 27 January 1924. The Centre Party remained the largest faction, winning 14 of the 30 seats, but lost its majority. At its first meeting on 6 March, all parties except the Communists affirmed their continued loyalty to Germany. Peter Scheuer of the Centre Party was elected President of the Landesrat on 24 March.

== Electoral system ==
The election was held using the open list system, with each voter able to cast up to 30 votes.

== Results ==
Party	Votes	%	Seats	+/–
Centre Party	3,246,511	42.77	14	–2
Social Democratic Party	1,398,949	18.43	6	+1
Communist Party	1,207,211	15.90	5	+3
German-Saarland People's Party	1,127,258	14.85	4	–1
Association of Homeowners and Agriculture – German Economic Association	311,722	4.11	1	–1
Saarland Workers' Group	207,129	2.73	0	New
German National Party	91,631	1.21	0	New
Total	7,590,411	100.00	30	0
Valid votes	254,858	99.69		
Invalid/blank votes	801	0.31		
Total votes	255,659	100.00		
Registered voters/turnout	378,459	67.55		
Source: Gonschior.de
