= Territory of the Saar Basin =

League of Nations Mandate in Weimar Republic (1920–35)

Coordinates: 49°23′N 6°50′E

Territory of the Saar Basin Saargebiet, Saarterritorium (German) Territoire du bassin de la Sarre (French)
- 1920–1935
- Flag Coat of arms

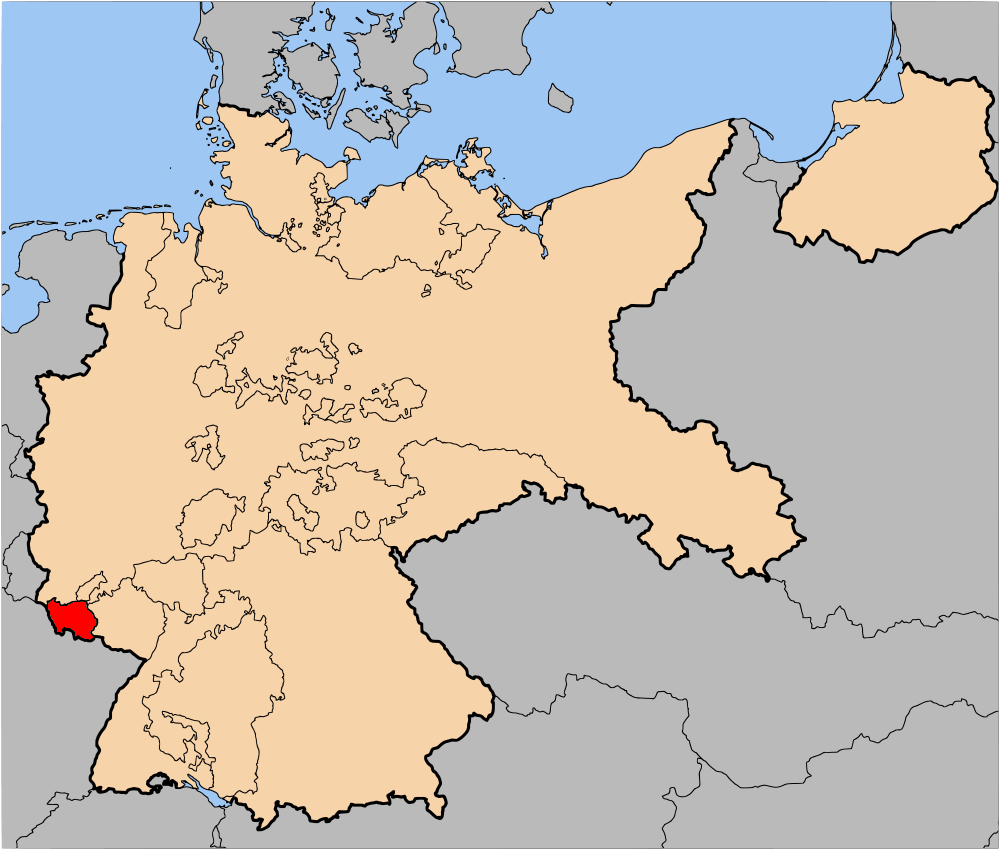
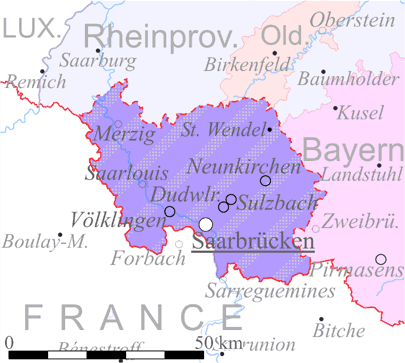
- Maps of the Territory of the Saar Basin -The Saar Basin (red) -The Saar Basin (purple)
- Status: Territory under League of Nations protection
- Capital: Saarbrücken
- Common languages: French; German; Rhine Franconian; Moselle Franconian
- Commission Chairman
  - 1920–1926: Victor Rault
  - 1926–1927: G. W. Stephens
  - 1927–1932: Ernest Wilton
  - 1932–1935: Geoffrey Knox
- President of the Landesrat
  - 1922–1924: B. Koßmann
  - 1924–1935: Peter Scheuer
- Historical era: Interwar period
  - Treaty of Versailles took effect: 10 January 1920
  - Plebiscite: 13 January 1935
  - Disestablished: 1 March 1935

Population
  - 1933: 812,000
- Currency: Saar franc
Preceded by
Free State of Prussia
Rhine Province
Kingdom of Bavaria
Circle of the Rhine
Succeeded by
Gau Westmark
- Today part of: Germany

The Territory of the Saar Basin (German: Saarbeckengebiet, Saarterritorium; French: Territoire du bassin de la Sarre) was a region occupied and governed by the United Kingdom and France from 1920 to 1935 under a League of Nations mandate. It had its own flag (adopted on 28 July 1920): a blue, white, and black horizontal tricolour. The blue and white stood for Bavaria, and white and black for Prussia, out of whose lands the Saar Territory was formed. Initially, the occupation was under the auspices of the Treaty of Versailles. Its population in 1933 was 812,000, and its capital was Saarbrücken. The territory closely corresponds with the modern German state of Saarland, but was slightly smaller in area. After a plebiscite was held in 1935, it was returned to Germany.

== Governing Commission ==
Under the Treaty of Versailles, the highly industrialized Saar Basin, including the Saar Coal District (German: Saarrevier), was to be occupied and governed by the United Kingdom of Great Britain and Ireland and the French Third Republic under a League of Nations mandate for a period of fifteen years. Its coalfields were also to be ceded to France. During this time, the Saar Territory was governed by the five-person Governing Commission (German: Regierungskommission; abbreviated Reko) made up of representatives of the occupation forces. Under the terms of the mandate, the Commission had to include at least one French person and one German resident of the Saar. After the fifteen years, a plebiscite would be implemented to determine the Saar's future status.

The Territory comprised the portions of the Prussian Rhenish Trier Region and the Bavarian district of the Palatinate, whose populations included a significant number of the miners who worked in the Saar coal mines. The Territory issued its own postage stamps and currency (the Saar franc).

=== Chairman of the Governing Commission ===
The Saar region was governed by the following Chairmen of the Commission of Government:

No.	Portrait	Name (birth–death)	Term of office			Country
No.	Portrait	Name (birth–death)	Took office	Left office	Time in office	Country
1		Victor Rault (1858–1930)	26 February 1920	31 March 1926	6 years, 33 days	France
2		George Washington Stephens (1866–1942)	1 April 1926	9 June 1927	1 year, 69 days	Canada
3		Sir Ernest Wilton (1870–1952)	9 June 1927	31 March 1932	4 years, 296 days	United Kingdom
4		Sir Geoffrey George Knox (1884–1958)	1 April 1932	28 February 1935	2 years, 333 days	United Kingdom

== Regional Council of the Saar Territory ==
The Saar Territory had no home rule; instead, the Governing Commission (known in German as the Regierungskommission or "Reko" for short) decided on all legislation alone. According to paragraph 23 of the Versailles Treaty the Governing Commission had to establish an assembly of elected representatives of the inhabitants of the Saar Territory in such a manner as the Governing Commission would determine itself. So on 24 March 1922, after four years without any official representation of the people, the Reko decreed the formation of a Saar Territory assembly called the Regional Council (German: Landesrat). In June 1922 the Governing Commission held the first election of the Regional Council, and starting with the second election of the Regional Council in 1924, the legislation period was extended from three to four years, with elections in 1928, and in 1932.

The Regional Council counted 30 members, the Governing Commission deliberately determined one person as the chairperson, the president of the Regional Council (Landesratspräsident). In the first legislative period the Reko did not even choose the president from amongst its members. The assembly was not a parliament, but only a consultative body; the representatives could be heard, but had no say in the agenda to be debated, let alone in legislation. The agenda of matters to be debated was exclusively set up by the Governing Commission. The members of the Regional Council had neither the right of interpellation, nor the right to actively bring a subject to the agenda, nor the right to table a bill. Its members did not enjoy immunity. When the Governing Commission did not set an issue on the Regional Council's agenda, they could only send delegations to the League of Nations with pleas, and so they did.

With this situation, all the representatives elected to the Regional Council, regardless of the party, opposed the system of autocratic rule in the Saar Territory. All parties demanded the return of the Saar Territory to Germany where the people could elect the parliament, and the latter again, the government in self-determination. Only after the Nazi takeover in Germany, outlawing all other parties except their own NSDAP, did the Bezirk Saar of the SPD and the Saar branch of the KPD leave the opposing block and support the status quo. For the 1935 status referendum, Social Democrats and Communists suggested, unsuccessfully, that the voters should decide in favour of a continued status quo.

=== Government-appointed presidents of the Regional Council ===
Name	Period	Party
Bartholomäus Koßmann	19 July 1922 – 23 March 1924	Centre Party
Peter Scheuer	24 March 1924 – 28 February 1935	Centre Party

== Plebiscite ==
In 1933, a considerable number of political opponents of National Socialism moved to the Saar, as it was the only part of Germany that remained under foreign occupation following World War I. As a result, anti-Nazi groups agitated for the Saarland to remain under British and French occupation under a League of Nations mandate. However, as most of the region's population was German, the mandate was unpopular. A plebiscite was held in the territory on 13 January 1935.

With Adolf Hitler anxious for the propaganda advantages of the return of the Saar to Germany, Joseph Goebbels designed a concerted campaign to sway voters. The support of the local Catholic authorities for a return also helped, as did concerns about Bolshevism, against which Hitler was seen as a bulwark. With a voter participation of 98%, the result of the plebiscite was that the overwhelming majority, 90.8%, voted to re-join the German Reich, with only 8.8% wanting to retain the status quo, primarily as they did not wish to be ruled by Nazis. A third option of joining France received 0.4% of the vote.

Following the vote, Hitler announced that Germany "had no further territorial demands to make of France."

The Nansen International Office for Refugees was responsible for the successful settlement of the Saar refugees in Paraguay after 1935.

== German rule ==
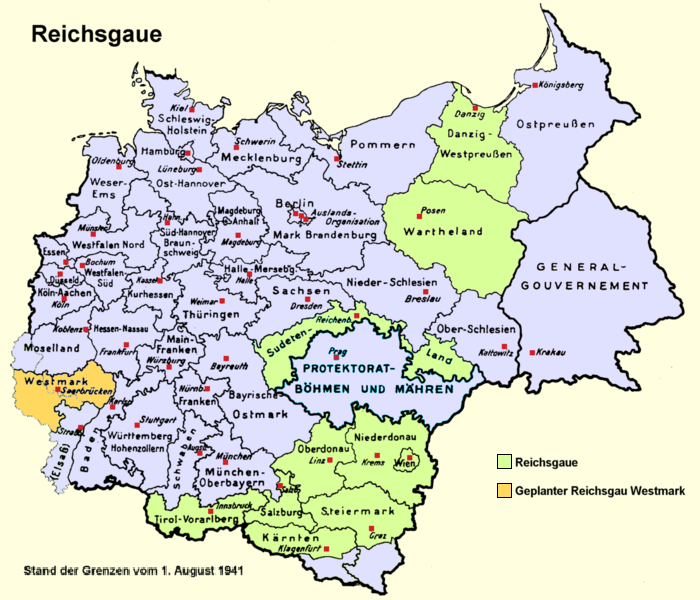
Nazi Germany in 1941. The planned Reichsgau of Westmark, which would include the Saar region, is shown here in yellow.

On 17 January 1935, the territory's reunion with Germany was approved by the League Council. On 1 March, Germany re-integrated the region into the German Reich, appointing Josef Bürckel as Reichskommissar für die Rückgliederung des Saarlandes, "Reich Commissioner for the reincorporation of the Saarland."

Many opponents of Nazism who had taken refuge in the territory and former politicians and office holders of the Saar who had collaborated with the occupation were imprisoned.

When re-incorporation was considered complete, the governor's title was changed again to Reichskommissar für das Saarland, "Reich Commissioner for the Saarland," on 17 June 1936. As the new Gau was extended to the Rhine, including the Bavarian district of Palatinate, the region's name was changed again on 8 April 1940 to Saarpfalz, "Saar-Palatinate."

After the Battle of France, the re-annexed territory of the CdZ-Gebiet Lothringen was incorporated in the Reichsgau. The region's name was finalized on 11 March 1941 as Westmark, meaning "Western March" or "Western Boundary," with its governor styled as Reichsstatthalter in der Westmark, "Reich Governor in the Western March." On 28 September 1944, Reich Commissioner Josef Bürckel died, and was succeeded by Willi Stöhr until 21 March 1945, when the region was conquered by troops of the United States Army, which handed over the occupation to French forces in July the same year.

== French protectorate ==
After World War II, a French protectorate was established within borders similar to those of the Territory. A referendum was held on 23 October 1955 which ended French rule and influence. On 1 January 1957, the Saarland joined West Germany.

== See also ==
- Saarland
- Saar Protectorate, under French control (1947–1956).
- Sarre, a department of France (1798–1814).
- Saar River
- Nazi Germany
- German Empire
- Free City of Danzig
