= Ludwig Windthorst =

19th century German Catholic politician (1812–1891)

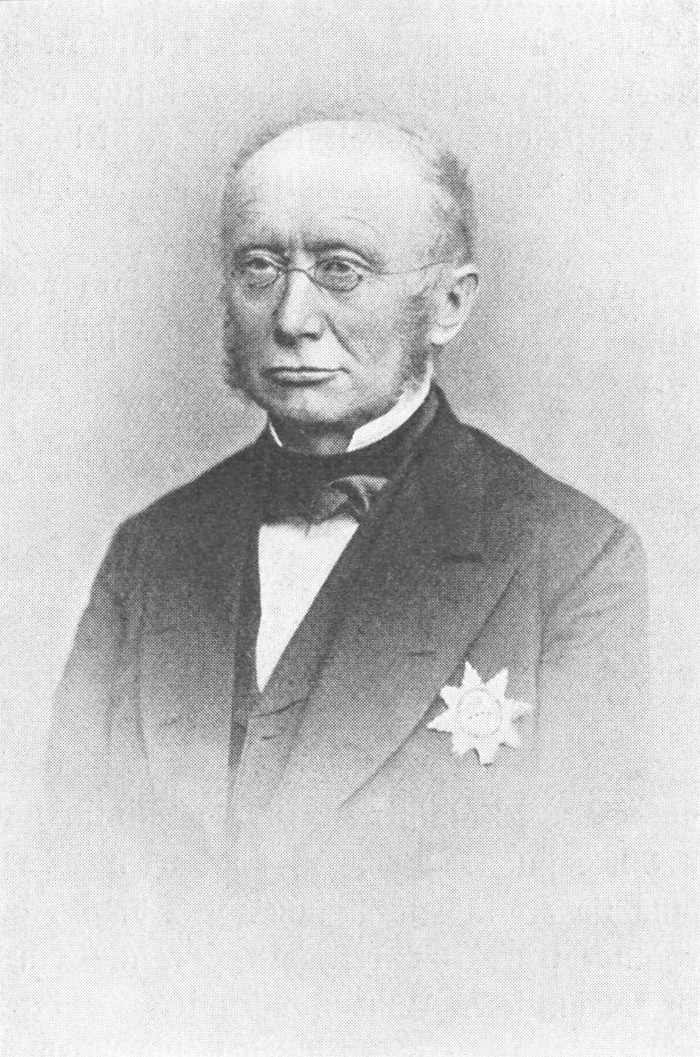
- Windthorst in 1872

Leader of the Centre Party
- In office 26 May 1874 – 14 March 1891
- Preceded by: Hermann von Mallinckrodt
- Succeeded by: Franz von Ballestrem

Member of the Reichstag
- In office 21 March 1871 – 14 March 1891
- Constituency: Hanover 3

Personal details
- Born: 17 January 1812 Ostercappeln, Ems-Supérieur, France
- Died: 14 March 1891 (aged 79) Berlin, Prussia, Germany
- Party: Centre Party

Ludwig Windthorst (17 January 1812 – 14 March 1891) was a German politician and leader of the Catholic Centre Party and the most notable opponent of Chancellor Otto von Bismarck during the Prussian-led unification of Germany and the Kulturkampf. Margaret L. Anderson argues that he was "Imperial Germany's greatest parliamentarian" and bears comparison with Irishmen Daniel O'Connell and Charles Stewart Parnell "in his handling of party machinery and his relation to the masses".

He entered politics during the revolutionary years of 1848 and 1849 in the Protestant Kingdom of Hanover, where his legal and political skills overcame the handicap of near blindness and being in an unpopular minority. He supported Hanoverian independence ("particularism") and was loyal to monarchism. He was not a Liberal, but they admired his opposition to the king's reactionary policies and his strong support for an independent judiciary and the rights of the accused. He served in 1851 and 1862 as minister of justice.

When Prussia absorbed Hanover and then set up the German Empire in 1871, Windthorst dealt with the new state of affairs and became a leader of the all-Catholic Centre Party. It won over 80% of the Catholic vote in a new nation that was one-third Catholic. He opposed Bismarck's harassment of minorities such as Catholics, Hanoverian Guelphs, Poles, Danes, and Alsatians. He argued for natural law as the basis of political rights. He perfected the arts of opposition, forming alliances that could win majorities. The Centre party became what Anderson calls "a liberal party manque". That is, it kept its distance from the anti-Catholic National Liberal Party but championed the rights of minorities, the powers of parliament, and the rule of law against Bismarck's moves.

In the 1870s, he was a vigorous enemy of Bismarck's Kulturkampf, which persecuted the Catholic Church in Prussia in an effort to destroy papal control. Bismarck eventually lost, but it was Pope Leo XIII who negotiated with Bismarck in the end, cutting Windthorst out.

== Biography ==
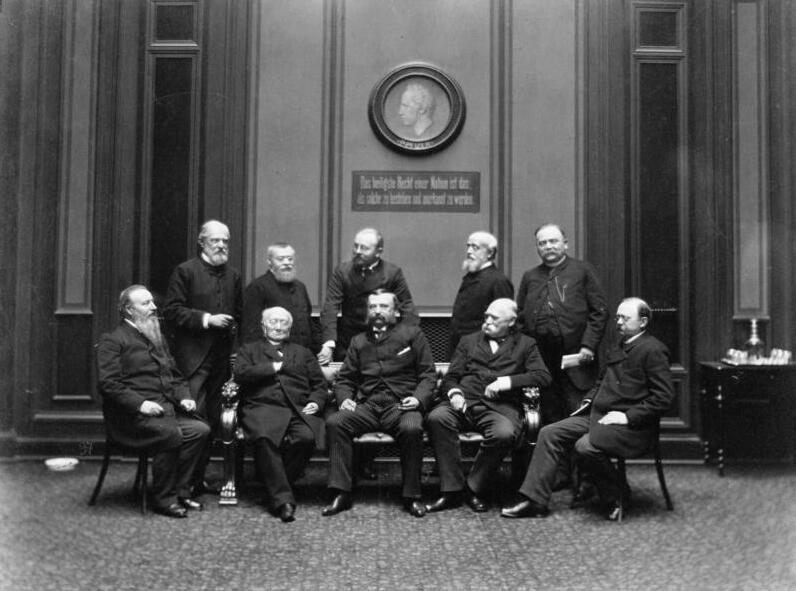
Centre Party members of the Reichstag (First line sitting from left to right: Paul Letocha, Dr. Ludwig Windthorst, Graf v. Johann Anton von Chamaré, Anton von Dejanicz-Gliszczynski, Albert Horn second line-standing-left to right: Graf v. Friedrich von Praschma, Philipp Schmieder (not Centre party), Dr. Felix Porsch, Dr. Clemens Heereman von Zuydwyck, Julius Szmula)

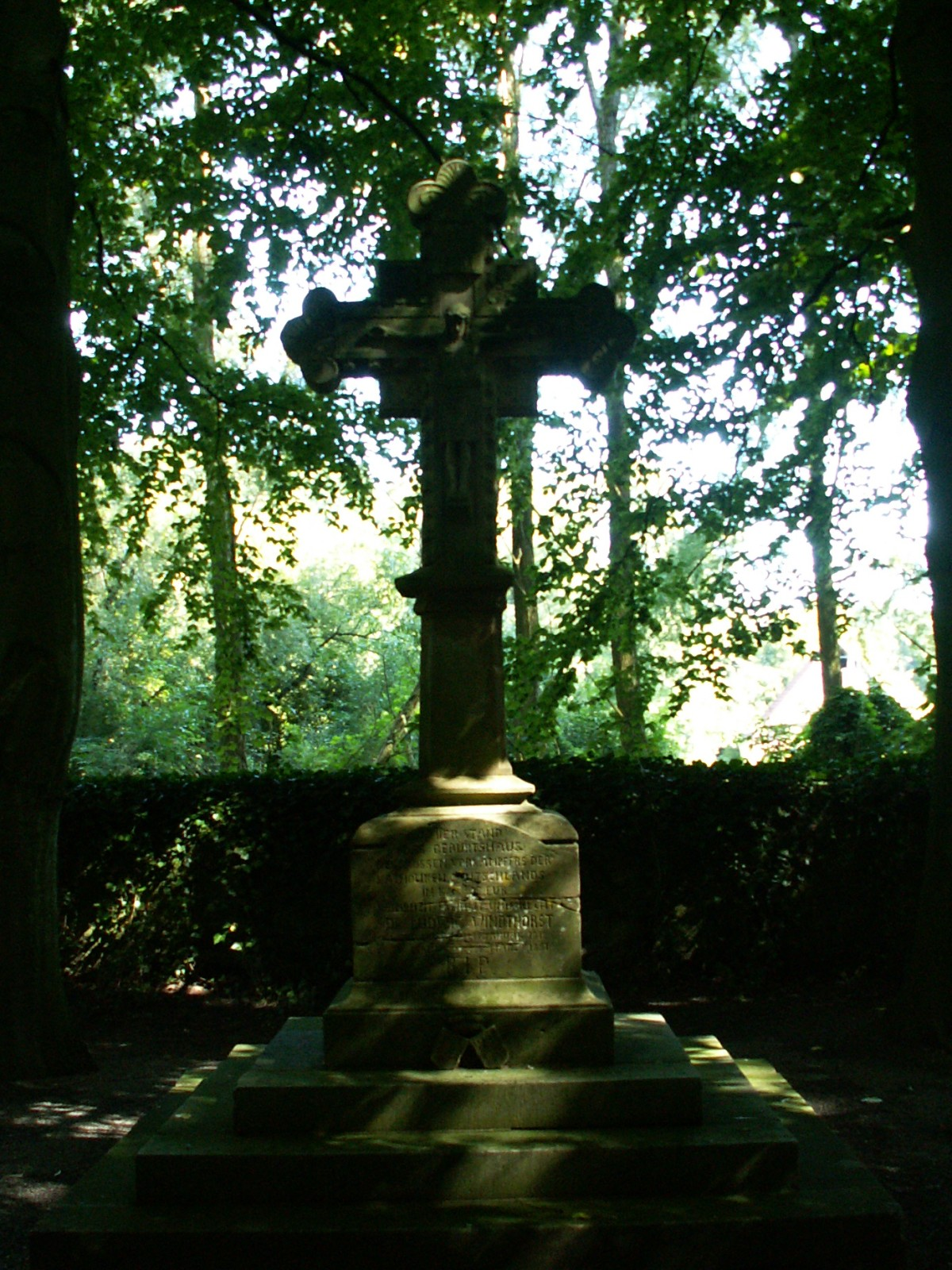
Memorial at Kaldenhof

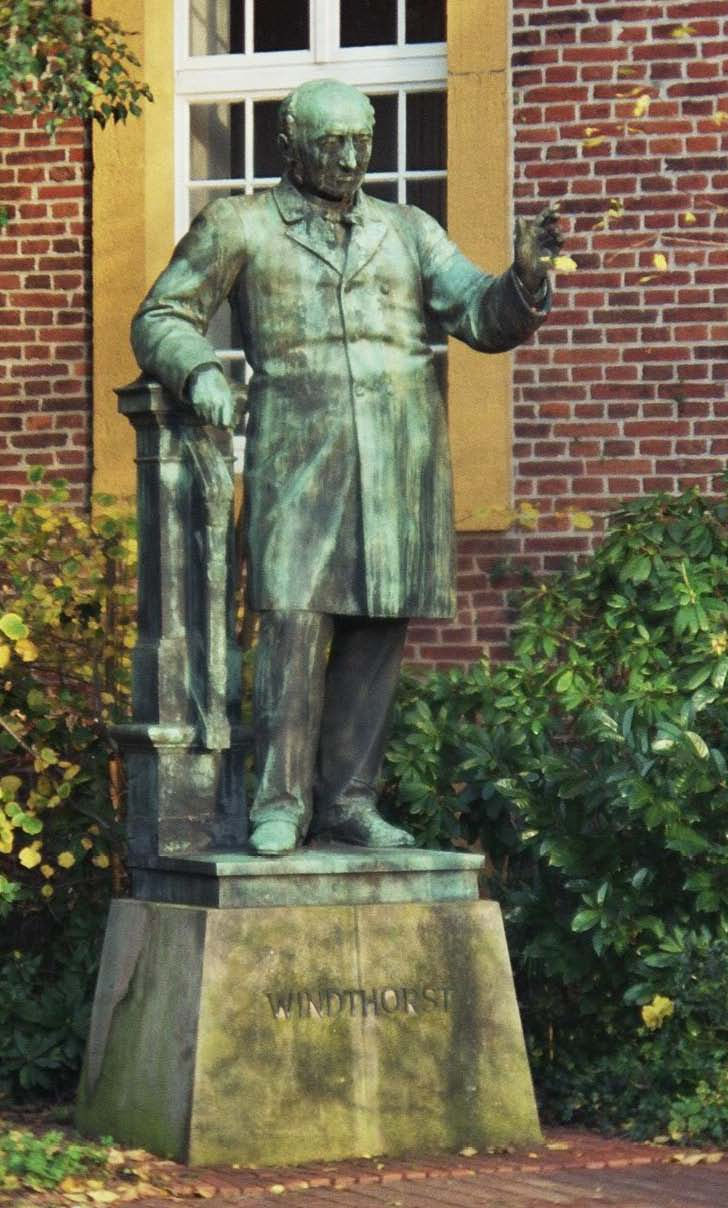
Memorial at the Meppen Windthorst school

Windthorst was born at Kaldenhof manor in the present-day municipality of Ostercappeln, in the lands of the former Prince-Bishopric of Osnabrück, which had been secularised to the Electorate of Hanover under the Protestant Welf dynasty in 1803. The growth-restricted boy was raised in a Roman Catholic family, which for some generations had held important posts in the bishopric's civil service. Windthorst became a half-orphan at the age of ten, when his father died in 1822. He was educated at the Gymnasium Carolinum, an endowed school at Osnabrück which he left with excellent Abitur exams, and from 1830 studied law at the universities of Göttingen and Heidelberg. Influenced by the rise of liberalism during the Vormärz era and the 1832 Hambach Festival as well as by the Catholic theologian Georg Hermes, Windthorst tried to bring his Catholic confession in accordance with the ideals of liberty, civil rights and national unity.

In 1836, Windthorst settled down as an advocate in Osnabrück: his abilities soon procured him a considerable practice, and he was appointed president of the Catholic consistory in 1842. Though socially disadvantaged, the Catholics had remained loyal to the ruling House of Hanover during the 1837 insurrection of the Göttingen Seven against King Ernest Augustus, and in 1848 Windthorst received an appointment at the supreme court of appeal (Oberappellationsgericht) for the Kingdom of Hanover at Celle. The March Revolution opened for him — as for so many of his contemporaries — the way to public life and though he failed to gain a mandate for the Frankfurt Assembly, he was elected representative for his native district in the second chamber of the reformed Hanoverian parliament in 1849. He belonged to what was called the Greater German party, and opposed the project of reconstituting Germany under the leadership of the Kingdom of Prussia. He defended the government against the liberal and democratic opposition, and at this time, he began his struggle against the secularization of schools, which continued throughout his life.

In 1851, he was elected president of the chamber and, in the same year, minister of justice, the first Catholic to hold so high an office in Hanover. As minister, he carried through an important judicial reform — which had been prepared by his predecessor — but had to retire from office because he was opposed to the reactionary measures for restoring the influence and privileges of the nobility. Though he was always an enemy to liberalism, his natural independence of character prevented him from acquiescing in the reactionary measures of the king. In 1862, he again was appointed minister, but with others of his colleagues, he resigned when the king refused his assent to a measure for extending the franchise. Windthorst took no part in the critical Austro-Prussian War; contrary to the opinion of many of his friends, after the annexation of Hanover by Prussia, he accepted the fait accompli, took the oath of allegiance, and was elected a member both of the Prussian parliament and of the North German diet.

In Berlin, he found a wider field for his abilities. He acted as representative of his exiled king in the negotiations with the Prussian government concerning his private property, and opposed the sequestration, and for the first time was placed in a position of hostility to Otto von Bismarck. He was recognized as the leader of the Hanoverians and of all those above who opposed the revolution. He took a leading part in the formation of the party of the Center in 1870–1871, but he did not become a member of it, for he feared that his reputation as a follower of the king of Hanover would injure the party; that is, until the leaders formally requested that he join them.

After the death of Hermann von Mallinckrodt (1821–1874) in 1874, Windthorst became leader of the party and maintained that position until his death. It was chiefly owing to his skill and courage as a parliamentary debater and his tact as a leader that the party held its own and constantly increased in numbers during the great struggle with the Prussian government. He was especially exposed to the attacks of Bismarck, who attempted, personally, to discredit him and to separate him from the rest of the party. And, he was by far the ablest and most dangerous critic of Bismarck's policy. The change of policy in 1879 led to a great alteration in his position: he was reconciled to Bismarck and even sometimes attended receptions at Bismarck's house. Never, however, was his position so difficult as during the negotiations which led to a repeal of the May laws.

Against the background of rising antisemitism, he stood up for the Jews and enforced the expulsion of antisemitic members from the Center Party.

In 1887, Bismarck appealed to the Pope to use his authority to order the center to support the military proposals of the government. Windthorst took the responsibility of keeping the papal instructions secret from the rest of his party and of disobeying the instructions. In a great meeting at Cologne in March 1887, he defended and justified his action, and claimed for the Center full independence of action in all purely political questions. In the social reform, he supported Bismarck, and as the undisputed leader of the largest party in the Reichstag, he was able to exercise influence over the action of the government after Bismarck's retirement. His relations with the emperor William II became very cordial, and in 1891 he achieved a great parliamentary triumph by defeating the School bill and compelling Heinrich von Gossler to resign.

== Death and legacy ==
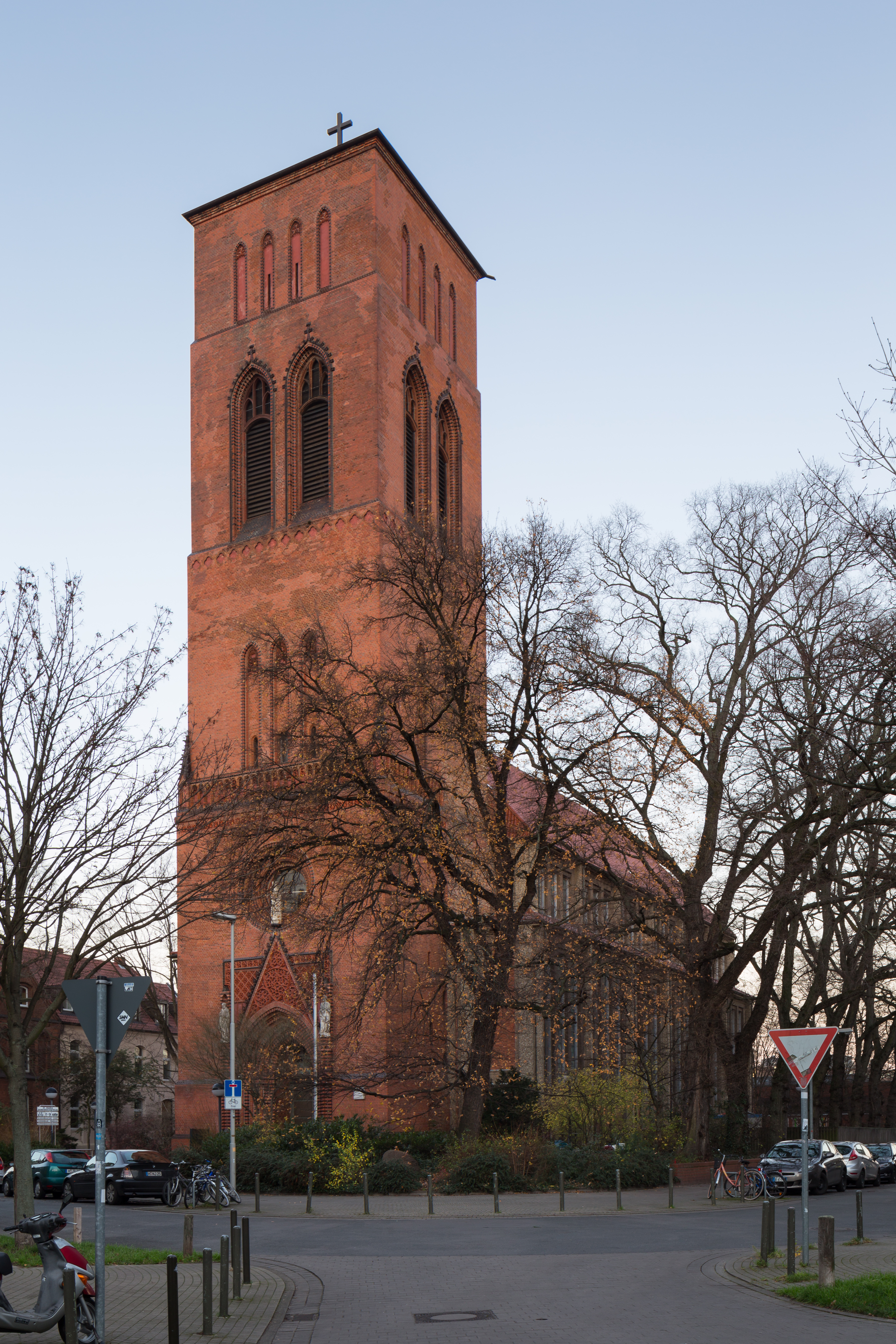
Church Marienkirche, Hanover

Windthorst died of pneumonia on 14 March 1891, in Berlin. Two days before, Emperor Wilhelm II paid him a visit at his deathbed. He was buried in the Marienkirche in Hannover, which had been erected from the money subscribed as a testimonial to him. The church was destroyed by bombing raids which occurred from July 1943 to March 1945 during World War II, though his grave was spared, and reconstructed in 1953/1954. His funeral was a most remarkable display of public esteem, in which nearly all the ruling princes of Germany joined, and was a striking sign of the position to which, after twenty years of incessant struggle, he had raised his party.

According to historian Golo Mann, Windthorst was one of the greatest of German parliamentary leaders: no one equaled him in his readiness as a debater — his defective eyesight compelling him to depend entirely upon his memory. It was his misfortune that nearly all his life was spent in opposition, and he had no opportunity of showing his abilities as an administrator. He enjoyed unbounded popularity and confidence among the German Catholics, but he was in no way an ecclesiastic: he was at first opposed to the Vatican decrees of 1870, but quickly accepted them after they had been proclaimed. He was a very agreeable companion and a thorough man of the world, singularly free from arrogance and pomposity — owing to his small stature, he was often known as "die kleine Excellenz".

Windthorst married Juliane (Julie) Sybille Caroline Engelen (12 September 1805 – 26 January 1898) on 29 May 1839; of his four living children, three died before him. They were Maria (26 September 1841 – 2 February 1933), Anna (12 April 1843 – 19 March 1867), Julius (15 November 1844 – 18 November 1872), and Eduard (7 July 1846 – 24 April 1860).

Windthorst's Ausgewählte Reden (Selected speeches) were published in three volumes (Osnabrück, 1901–1902).

== See also ==
- Windthorst, Texas, Windthorst, Kansas, and Windthorst, Saskatchewan were named in honor of Ludwig Windthorst

== Bibliography ==
- Anderson, Margaret Lavinia. "Confessions of a Fellow Traveler," The Catholic Historical Review (2013) 99#4, pp. 623–648.
- Zeender, John K. "Recent Literature on the German Center Party," The Catholic Historical Review (1984) 70#3, pp. 428–441.
- "Dr. Windthorst on Germany," The American Advocate of Peace and Arbitration (1890) 52#2, p. 45, interview in JSTOR.
- Spahn, Martin (1912). "Ludwig Windthorst" . In Herbermann, Charles (ed.). Catholic Encyclopedia. Vol. 15. New York: Robert Appleton Company.
