= Ems-Supérieur =

Former French department (1811–1814)

Coordinates: 52°29′34.13″N 7°51′18.81″E

Location of Ems-Supérieur in France (1812)

Ems-Supérieur (French: [ɛms sy.pe.ʁjœʁ], "Upper Ems"; German: Ober-Ems) was a department of the First French Empire in present-day Germany. It was formed in 1811, when the region was annexed by France. Its territory was part of the present-day German lands Lower Saxony and North Rhine-Westphalia. Its capital was Osnabrück.

The department was subdivided into the following arrondissements and cantons (situation in 1812):

- Osnabrück, cantons: Bramsche, Dissen, Bad Essen, Bad Iburg, Lengerich, Melle, Osnabrück (3 cantons), Ostbevern, Ostercappeln, Tecklenburg and Versmold.
- Minden, cantons: Petershagen, Bünde, Enger, Levern, Lübbecke, Minden, Quernheim, Rahden, Uchte and Werther.
- Quakenbrück, cantons: Ankum, Cloppenburg, Diepholz, Dinklage, Friesoythe, Löningen, Quakenbrück, Vechta, Vörden and Wildeshausen.
- Lingen, cantons: Bevergern, Freren, Fürstenau, Haselünne, Ibbenbüren, Lingen, Meppen, Papenburg and Sögel.

Its population in 1812 was 415,018.

After Napoleon was defeated in 1814, most of the department became part of the Kingdom of Hanover.
