= Clemens Heereman von Zuydwyck =

German politician (1832–1903)

Clemens Heereman von Zuydwyck (26 August 1832 in Hörstel/Riesenbeck – 23 March 1903 in Berlin) was a German Centre Party parliamentarian.

== Life ==
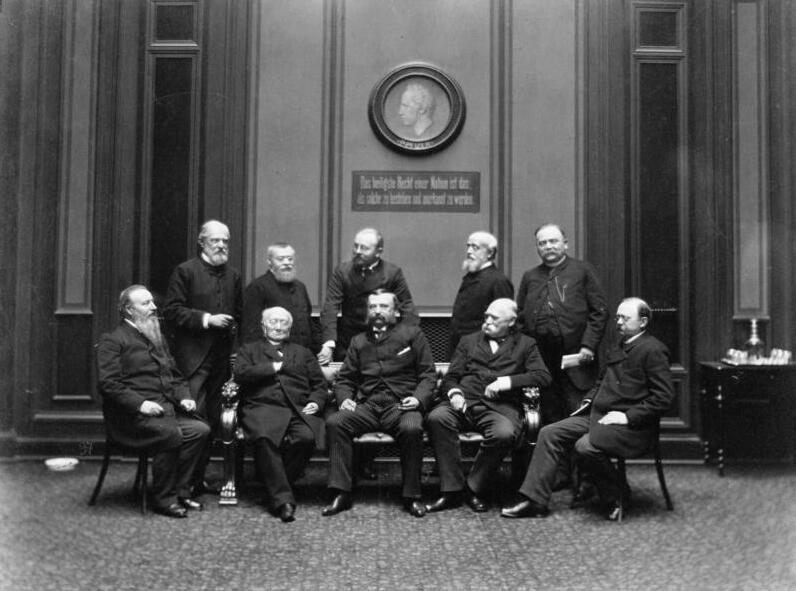
Centre Party Member of Reichstag (First line sitting from left to right: Paul Letocha, Dr. Ludwig Windthorst, Graf v. Johann Anton von Chamaré, Anton von Dejanicz-Gliszczynski, Albert Horn second line-standing-left to right: Graf v. Friedrich von Praschma, Philipp Schmieder (not Centre party), Dr. Felix Porsch, Dr. Frhr. Clemens Heereman von Zuydwyck, Julius Szmula)

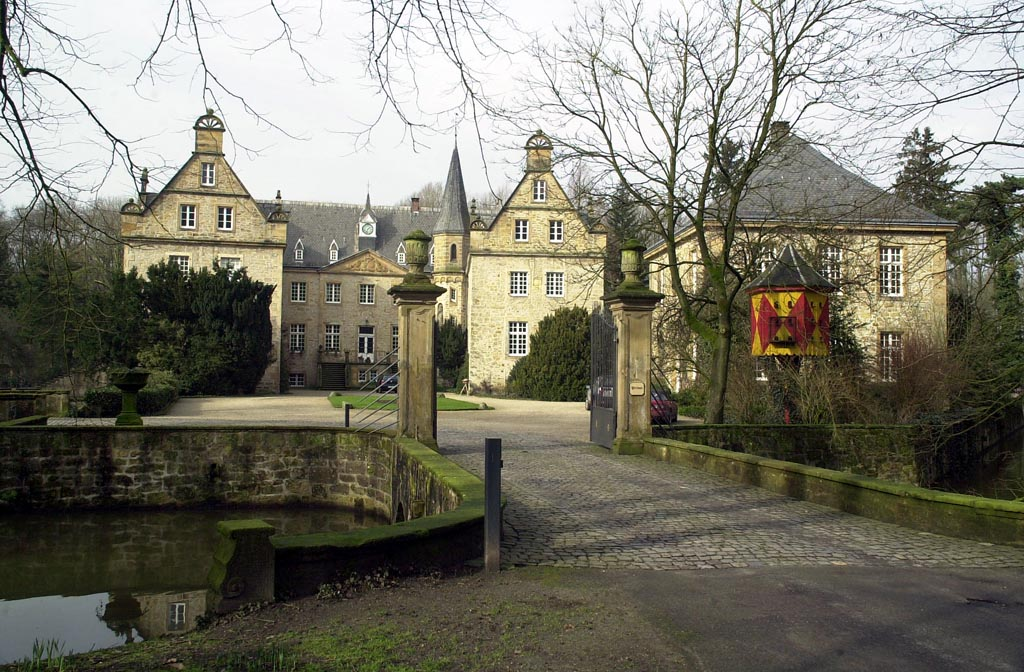
Surenburg in Hörstel/Riesenbeck

From 1870 to 1903 Heereman von Zuydwyck was a member of the German Reichstag. He lived with his family on castle Surenburg in Hörstel-Riesenbeck.

== Awards ==
- Order of St. Gregory the Great
