= Birgte =

Village in North Rhine-Westphalia

Coordinates: 52°14′N 7°40′E

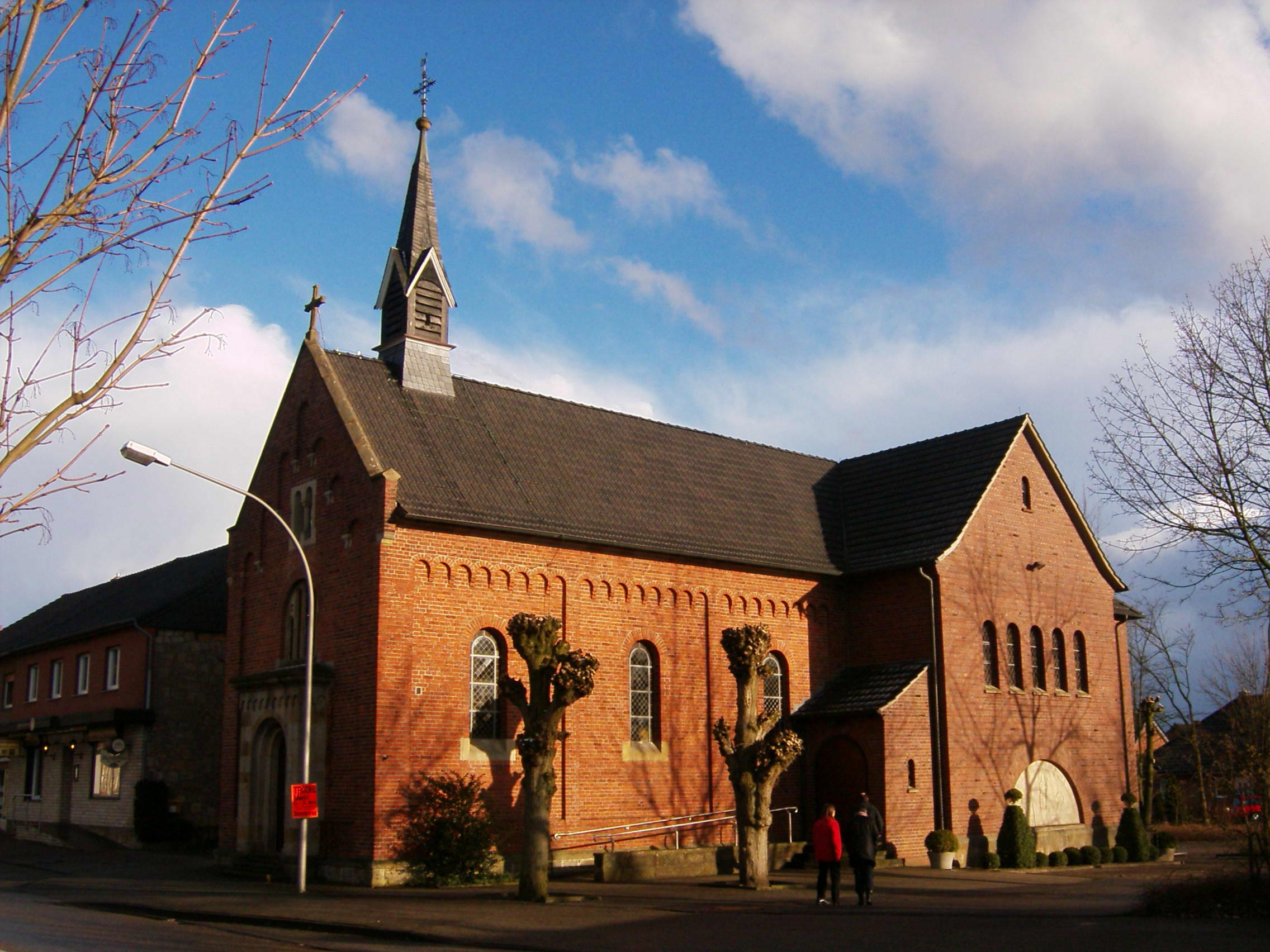
Chapel

Birgte is a village in the German state of North Rhine-Westphalia; it is part of the district of Riesenbeck and the town of Hörstel, and may be referred to as Hörstel-Birgte as a result. It is located at the north edge of the Teutoburger Forest Its roots go back until 1800 BC as an old farming area. First known written mention of Birgte is dated 1088 AD when single farms dominated the area.

== People ==
- Karl-Josef Laumann (born 1957), politician (CDU)
