= Hörstel =

- Town
- Flag Coat of arms

- Location of Hörstel within Steinfurt district
- Interactive map of Hörstel
- Location within Germany Location within North Rhine-Westphalia
- Coordinates: 52°17′50″N 7°35′10″E
- Country: Germany
- State: North Rhine-Westphalia
- Admin. region: Münster
- District: Steinfurt

Government
  - Mayor (2020–25): David Ostholthoff (SPD)

Area
  - Total: 107.54 km^{2} (41.52 sq mi)
- Elevation: 145 m (476 ft)

Population (2025-12-31)
  - Total: 20,101
  - Density: 186.92/km^{2} (484.11/sq mi)
- Time zone: UTC+01:00 (CET)
  - Summer (DST): UTC+02:00 (CEST)
- Postal codes: 48477
- Dialling codes: 05454,05459,05978
- Vehicle registration: ST
- Website: www.hoerstel.de

Hörstel (German pronunciation: [ˈhœʁstl̩]; Low German: Hüörsel) is a town in the district of Steinfurt, in North Rhine-Westphalia, Germany. It is situated near the junction of the Mittellandkanal and the Dortmund-Ems Canal, approx. 10 km east of Rheine.

Parts of Hörstel are Riesenbeck, Dreierwalde, Birgte and Bevergern

== Population ==
Historical population

Year	Pop.	±% p.a.
1965	13,399	—
1970	14,126	+1.06%
1975	14,559	+0.61%
1980	15,022	+0.63%
1985	15,469	+0.59%
1990	15,772	+0.39%
1995	17,401	+1.99%

Year	Pop.	±% p.a.
2000	19,371	+2.17%
2005	19,865	+0.50%
2010	19,883	+0.02%
2015	19,995	+0.11%
2020	20,335	+0.34%
2025	20,101	−0.23%

Source: Landesdatabank Nordrhein-Westfalen

== Gallery ==
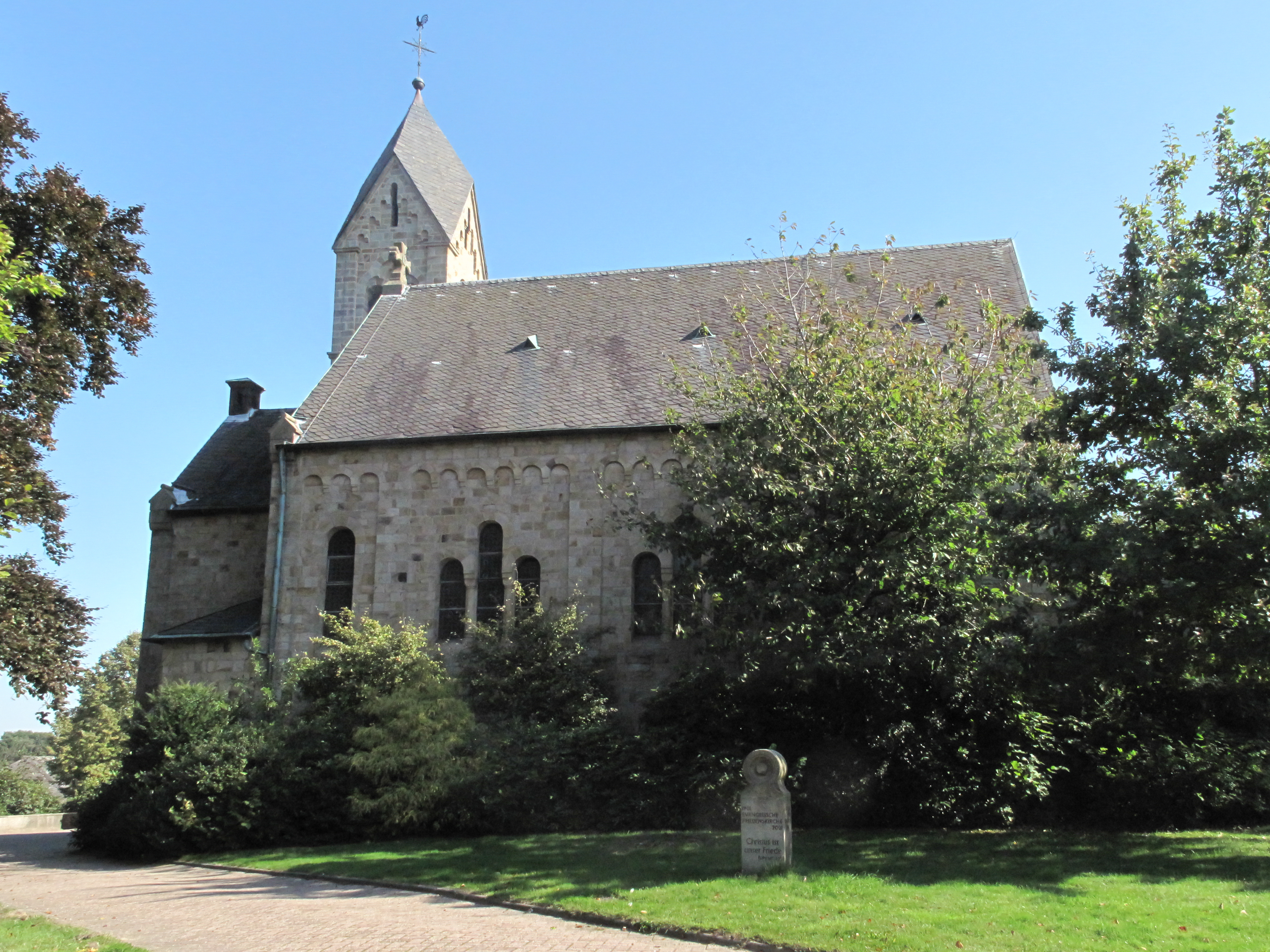
Hörstel, church: die Friedenskirche

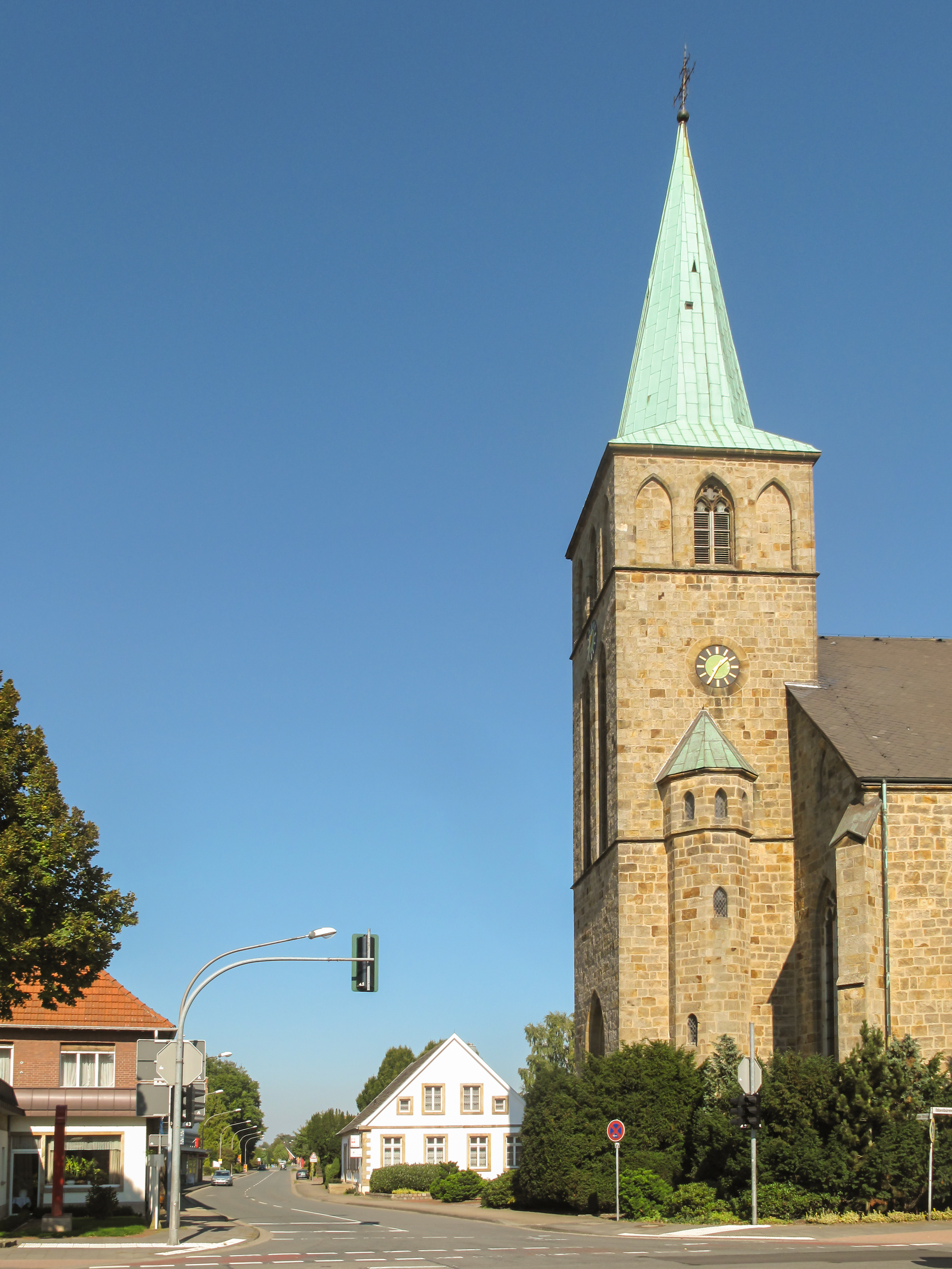
Hörstel, church: katholische Pfarrkirche Sankt Antonius

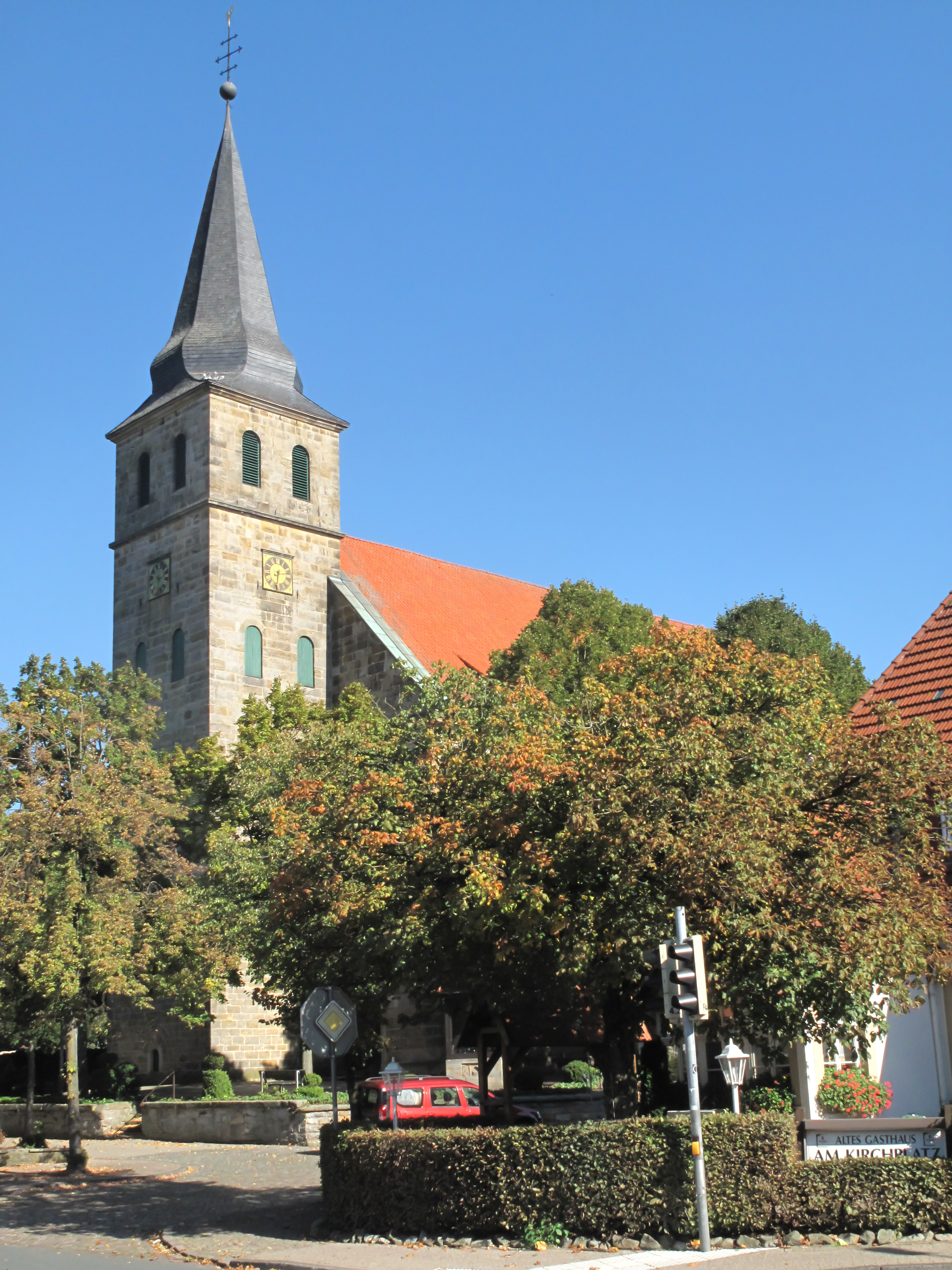
Riesenbeck, church: Sankt Kalixtus Kirche

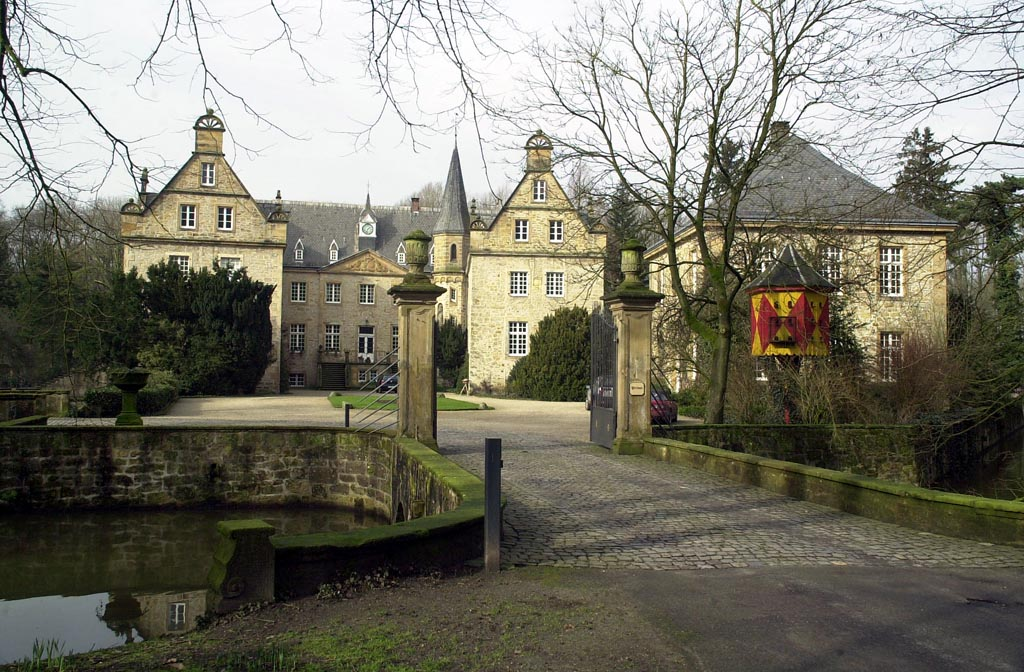
Surenburg in Riesenbeck

== People ==
- Georg Hermes (1775-1835), Roman Catholic theologian
- Clemens Heereman von Zuydwyck (1832-1903), farmer and politician (Zentrum)
- Constantin Heereman von Zuydtwyck (1931-2017), farmer, forester and politician (CDU)
- Norbert Klemens Strotmann Hoppe (born 1946), Roman-catholic bishop
- Karl-Josef Laumann (born 1957), politician (CDU)
- Peter Niemeyer (born 1983), football player and manager
