= Michael Hohnstedt =

German footballer

Personal information
- Date of birth: 3 May 1988 (age 38)
- Place of birth: Ostercappeln, West Germany
- Height: 1.83 m (6 ft 0 in)
- Position: Left-back

Team information
- Current team: Union Varl

Youth career
- Union Varl
- VfB Fabbenstedt
- Preußen Espelkamp
- –2007: Arminia Bielefeld

Senior career*
Years	Team	Apps	(Gls)
2007–2009	Arminia Bielefeld II	38	(1)
2009–2011	VfB Lübeck	67	(1)
2011–2013	Sportfreunde Lotte	67	(5)
2013–2017	VfL Osnabrück	124	(9)
2017–2018	Sportfreunde Lotte	9	(0)
2018–2019	Schwarz-Weiß Rehden	20	(1)
2019–	Union Varl	7	(2)
- * Club domestic league appearances and goals as of 12:31, 8 December 2020 (UTC)

Michael Hohnstedt (born 3 May 1988) is a German footballer who plays as a left-back for SpVgg Union Varl.

== Career ==
Hohnstedt ended his professional career at the end of the 2018-19 season and returned home to his former youth club SpVgg Union Varl.
