= Karl-Josef Laumann =

German politician (born 1957)

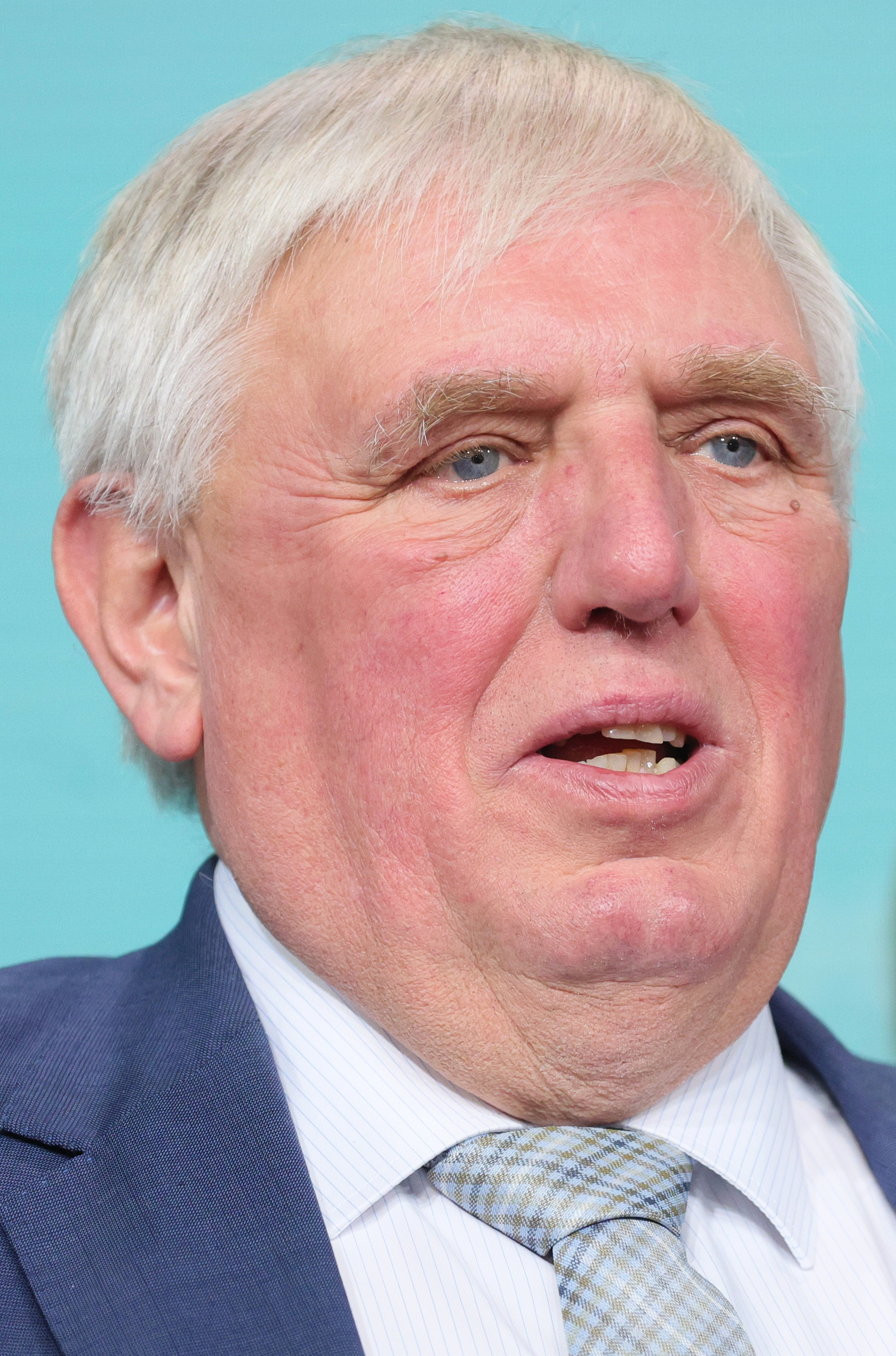
- Laumann in 2025

Minister of Labor, Health and Social Affairs for North Rhine-Westphalia
- Incumbent
- Assumed office 30 June 2017
- Prime Minister: Armin Laschet; Hendrik Wüst
- Preceded by: Rainer Schmeltzer (Labour and Social Affairs); Barbara Steffens (Health)

Member of the Bundestag Germany
- In office 17 January 1990 – 28 June 2005

Minister of Labor, Health and Social Affairs for North Rhine-Westphalia
- In office 23 June 2005 – 14 July 2010
- Prime Minister: Jürgen Rüttgers
- Preceded by: Harald Schartau (Labour); Birgit Fischer (Health and Social Affairs)
- Succeeded by: Guntram Schneider (Labour and Social Affairs); Barbara Steffens (Health)

Chairman of Parliamentary group of CDU in North Rhine-Westphalia
- In office 6 July 2010 – 13 December 2013
- Prime Minister: Jürgen Rüttgers; Hannelore Kraft

Vice Chairman of CDU North Rhine-Westphalia
- Incumbent
- Assumed office 6 November 2010

Personal details
- Born: 11 June 1957 (age 69) Birgte, West Germany
- Party: Christian Democratic Union (CDU)
- Occupation: Politician
- karl-josef-laumann.de

Karl-Josef Laumann (born 11 July 1957) is a German politician of the Christian Democratic Union (CDU). Since 2017, he has been the State Minister of Labor, Health and Social Affairs of North Rhine-Westphalia, an office he previously held between 2005 and 2010.

== Background and personal life ==
Laumann grew up with his parents and two brothers on a farm in Birgte, North Rhine-Westphalia. After attending school he was apprenticed as a machinist. After some military service, from 1978 to 1990 he gained experience at the Niemeyer company in Riesenbeck. As a member of IG Metall, he was for many years on the works council.

Karl-Josef Laumann is married and has three children. His eldest daughter is now secretary of the Junge Union in his home community of Riesenbeck.

== Political career ==
Karl-Josef Laumann started his political career at the Junge Union in the district of Steinfurt, as an honorary chairman, a position he still holds. Since 1974 he has been a member of the CDU and since 1977, a member of the Christian Democratic Employees' Association (CDA). Since 2005, he has been National Chairman of the CDA.

For several years, Laumann has been active in the Catholic Workers Movement (KAB). In April 1998, he was appointed chairman of the KAB for North Münsterland.

From 1990 until 28 June 2005, Laumann was a member of the Bundestag. He worked in the Labor and Social Affairs and Labor Economy of the Working Group of the CDU/CSU parliamentary groups. He was successively elected to represent the constituency Steinfurt II in North Rhine-Westphalia in the German Bundestag.

=== State Minister of Labor, Health and Social Affairs, 2005–2010 ===
After the 2005 state elections, on 23 June 2005, Laumann was appointed State Minister of Labor, Health and Social Affairs in the government led by Minister-President Jürgen Rüttgers of North Rhine-Westphalia.

In the negotiations to form a coalition government of the Christian Democrats and the FDP following the 2009 federal elections, Laumann was part of the CDU/CSU delegation in the working group on social affairs and labor policy, led by Ronald Pofalla and Dirk Niebel.

=== State Secretary in the Federal Ministry of Health, 2013–2017 ===
In the negotiations to form a Grand Coalition of the Christian Democrats (CDU together with the Bavarian CSU) and the SPD following the 2013 federal elections, Laumann was part of the CDU delegation in the working group on health policy, led by Jens Spahn and Karl Lauterbach. He was subsequently appointed State Secretary in the Federal Ministry of Health under the leadership of minister Hermann Gröhe in the third government of Chancellor Angela Merkel. In this capacity, he also served as the Federal Government's Commissioner for Patients' Affairs.

Laumann was a CDU delegate to the Federal Convention for the purpose of electing the President of Germany in 2017.

=== State Minister of Labor, Health and Social Affairs, 2017–present ===
Following the 2017 state elections in North Rhine-Westphalia, Laumann was part of the CDU team in the negotiations with Christian Lindner’s FDP on a coalition agreement. He led his party's delegation in the working group on economic affairs and energy policy; his co-chair of the FDP was Johannes Vogel.

Since July 2017, Laumann has been serving as State Minister for Minister of Labor, Health and Social Affairs in the government of Minister-President Armin Laschet. As one of his state's representatives at the Bundesrat, he serves on the Committee on Labour, Integration and Social Policy, the Committee on Health and the Committee on Family and Senior Citizen Affairs.

In the negotiations to form a fourth coalition government under Merkel following the 2017 federal elections, Laumann led the working group on social affairs, alongside Barbara Stamm and Andrea Nahles. Ahead of the Christian Democrats’ leadership election in 2018, he publicly endorsed Annegret Kramp-Karrenbauer to succeed Merkel as the party's chair.

== Other activities ==
- Institute for Quality and Efficiency in Health Care (IQWiG), Ex-Officio Member of the Board of Trustees (since 2013)
- Aktionsbündnis Patientensicherheit, Member of the Board of Trustees
- August Schmidt Foundation, IG Bergbau, Chemie, Energie, Member of the Board of Trustees
- IG Metall, Member
