= Ostercappeln =

- Municipality
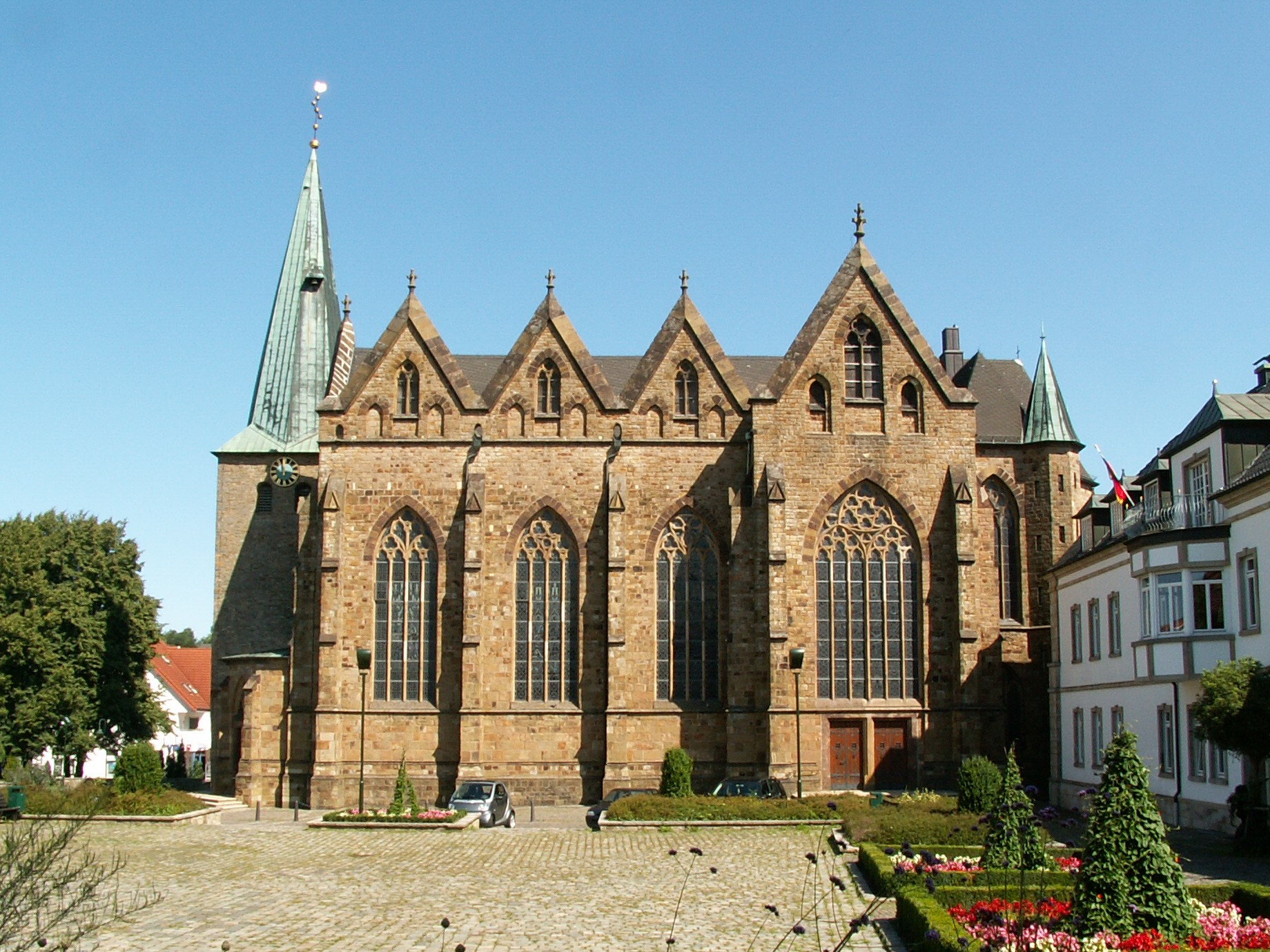
- Saint Lambert Church

- Coat of arms

- Location of Ostercappeln within Osnabrück district
- Interactive map of Ostercappeln
- Location within Germany Location within Lower Saxony
- Coordinates: 52°21′N 08°14′E
- Country: Germany
- State: Lower Saxony
- District: Osnabrück
- Subdivisions: 3

Government
  - Mayor (2021–26): Erik Ballmeyer (CDU)

Area
  - Total: 100.18 km^{2} (38.68 sq mi)
- Elevation: 73 m (240 ft)

Population (2025-12-31)
  - Total: 9,738
  - Density: 97.21/km^{2} (251.8/sq mi)
- Time zone: UTC+01:00 (CET)
  - Summer (DST): UTC+02:00 (CEST)
- Postal codes: 49179
- Dialling codes: 05473
- Vehicle registration: OS, BSB, MEL, WTL
- Website: www.ostercappeln.de

Ostercappeln is a municipality in the district of Osnabrück, in Lower Saxony, Germany. It is situated in the Wiehengebirge, approx. 15 km northeast of Osnabrück. The municipality is made up of three villages, Ostercappeln, Venne and Schwagstorf, along the Bundesstraße 218. Ostercappeln is the location of the St. Raphael hospital, which serves a general hospital for the surrounding municipalities and as a center for pulmonary diseases for the district.

== Mayor ==
Since 2021: Erik Ballmeyer

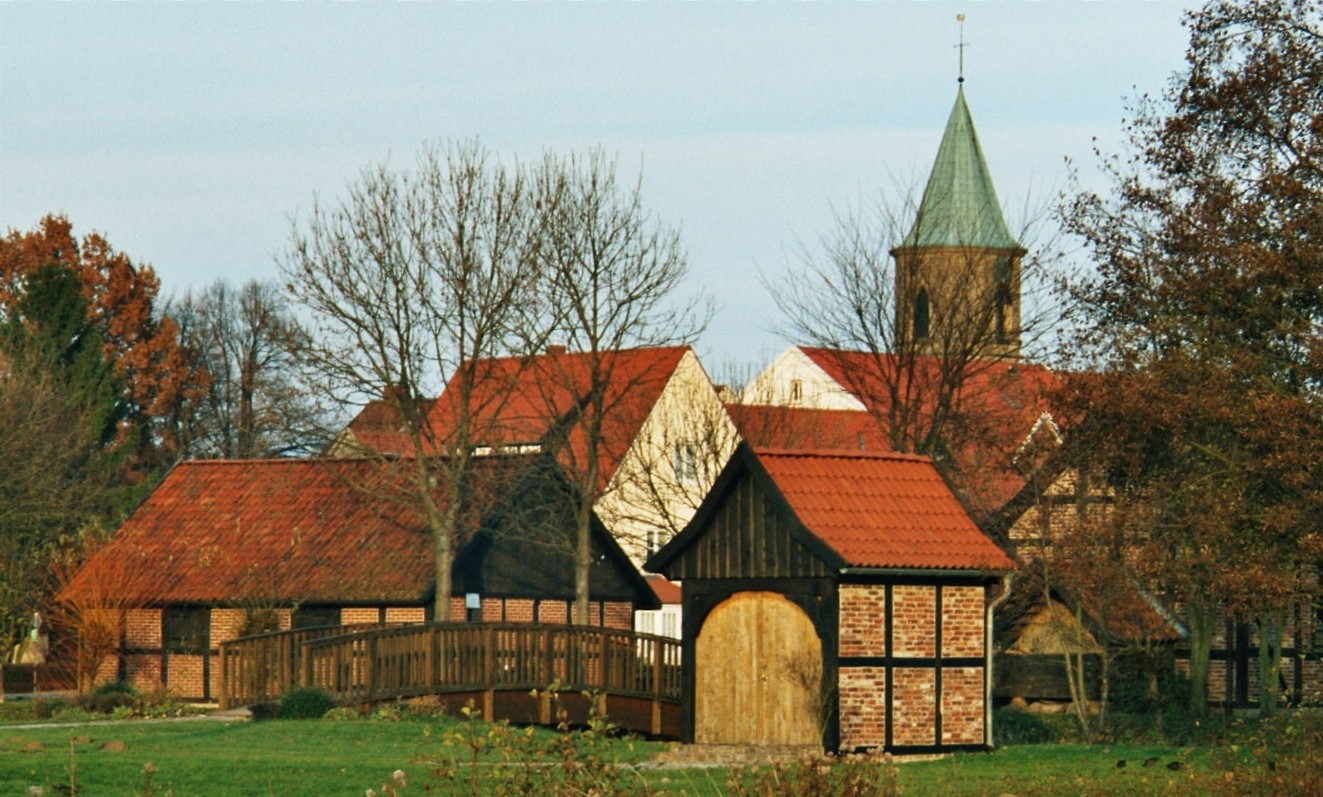
Mill island in Venne

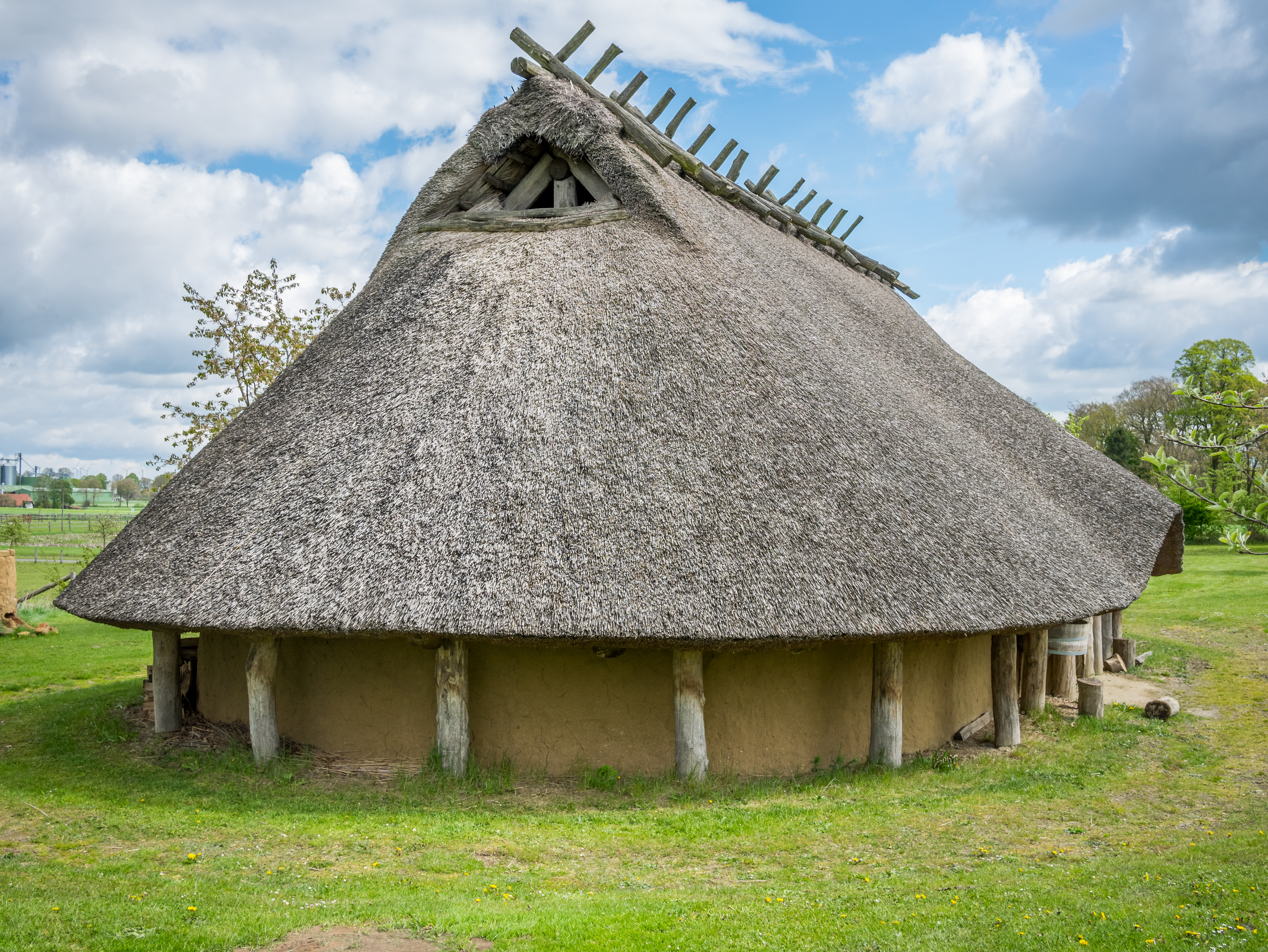
Replica of an Iron Age house in Darpvenne

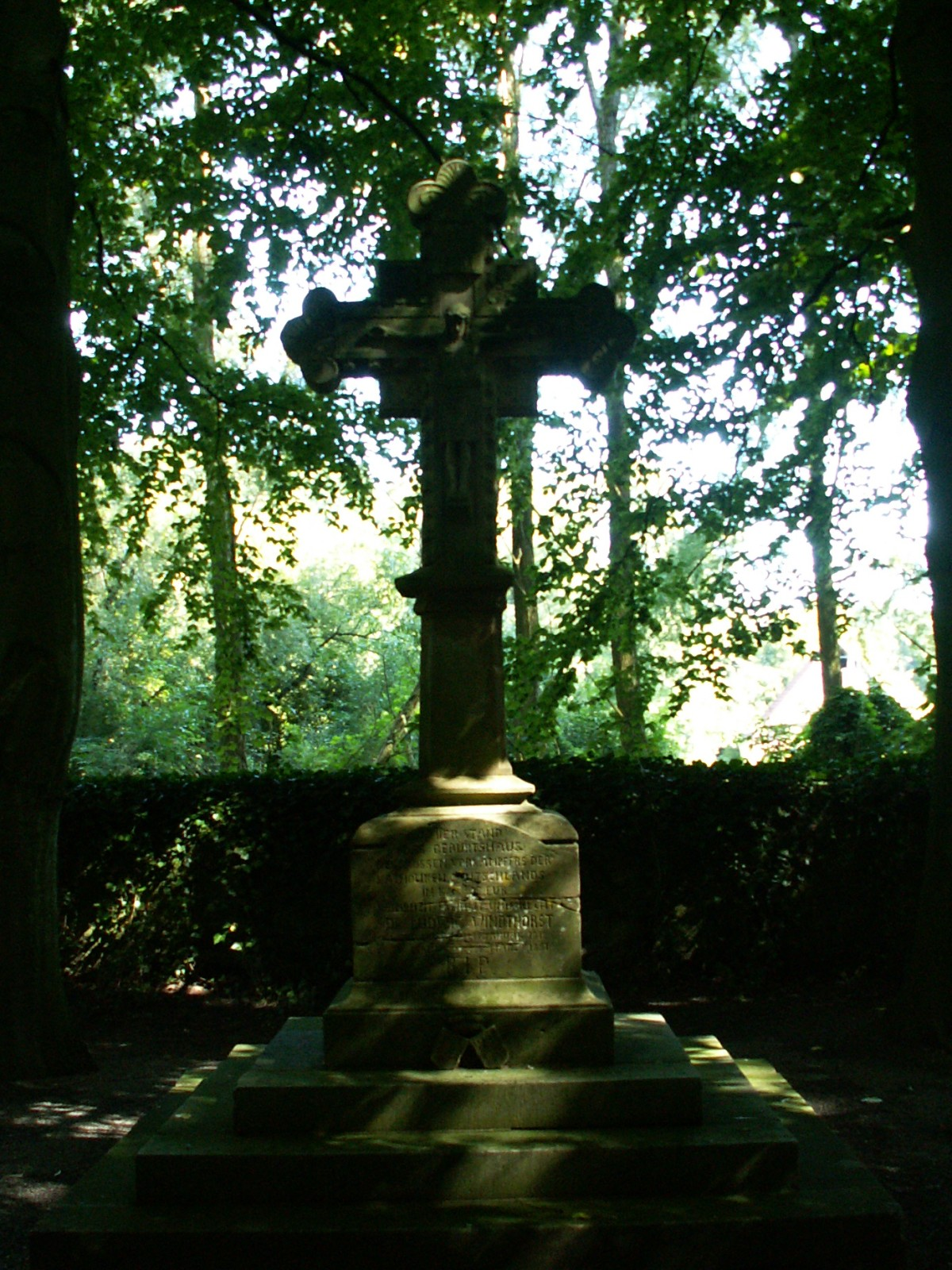
Ludwig Windthorst Memorial

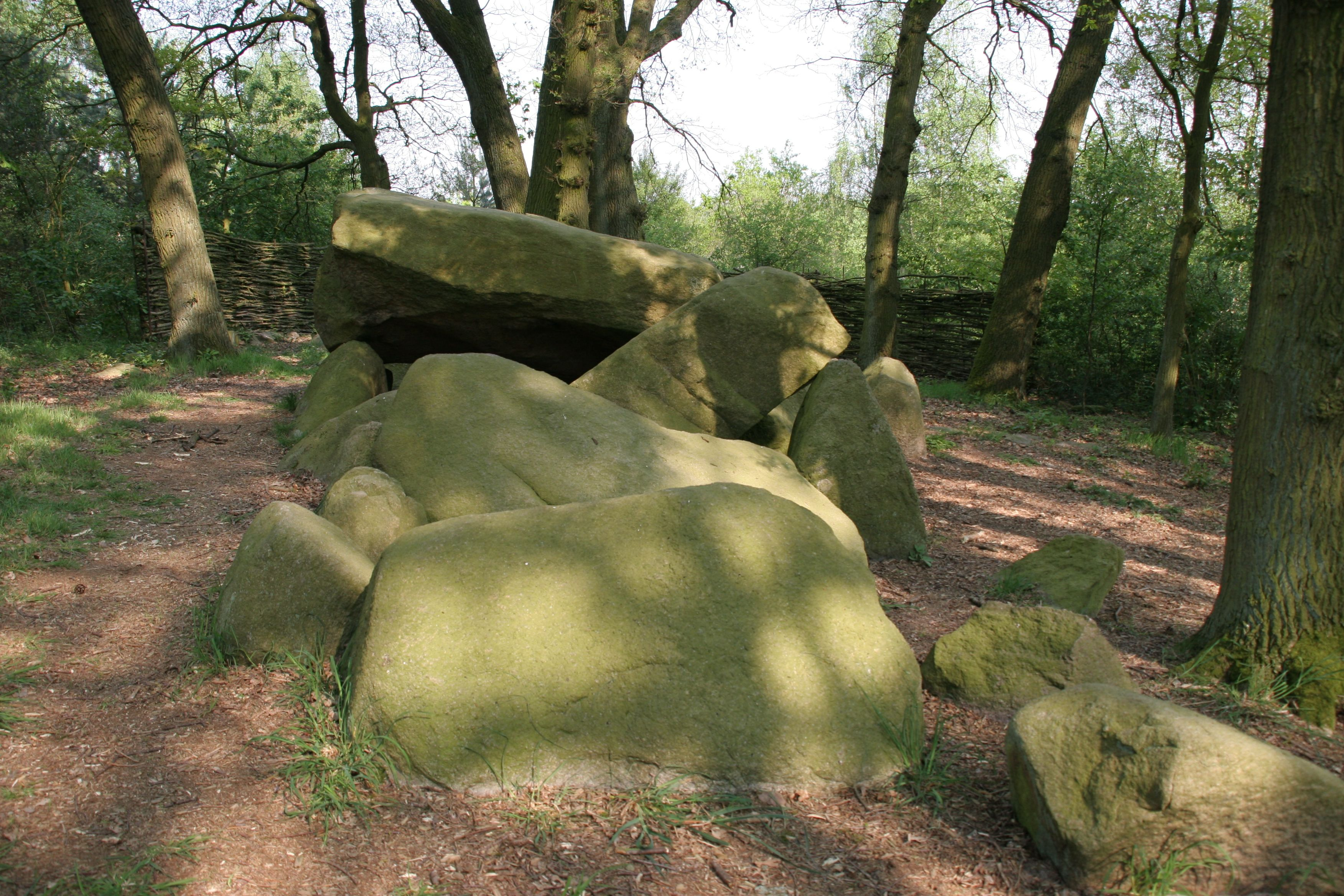
Megalithic chambered tomb "Darpvenner Steine I"

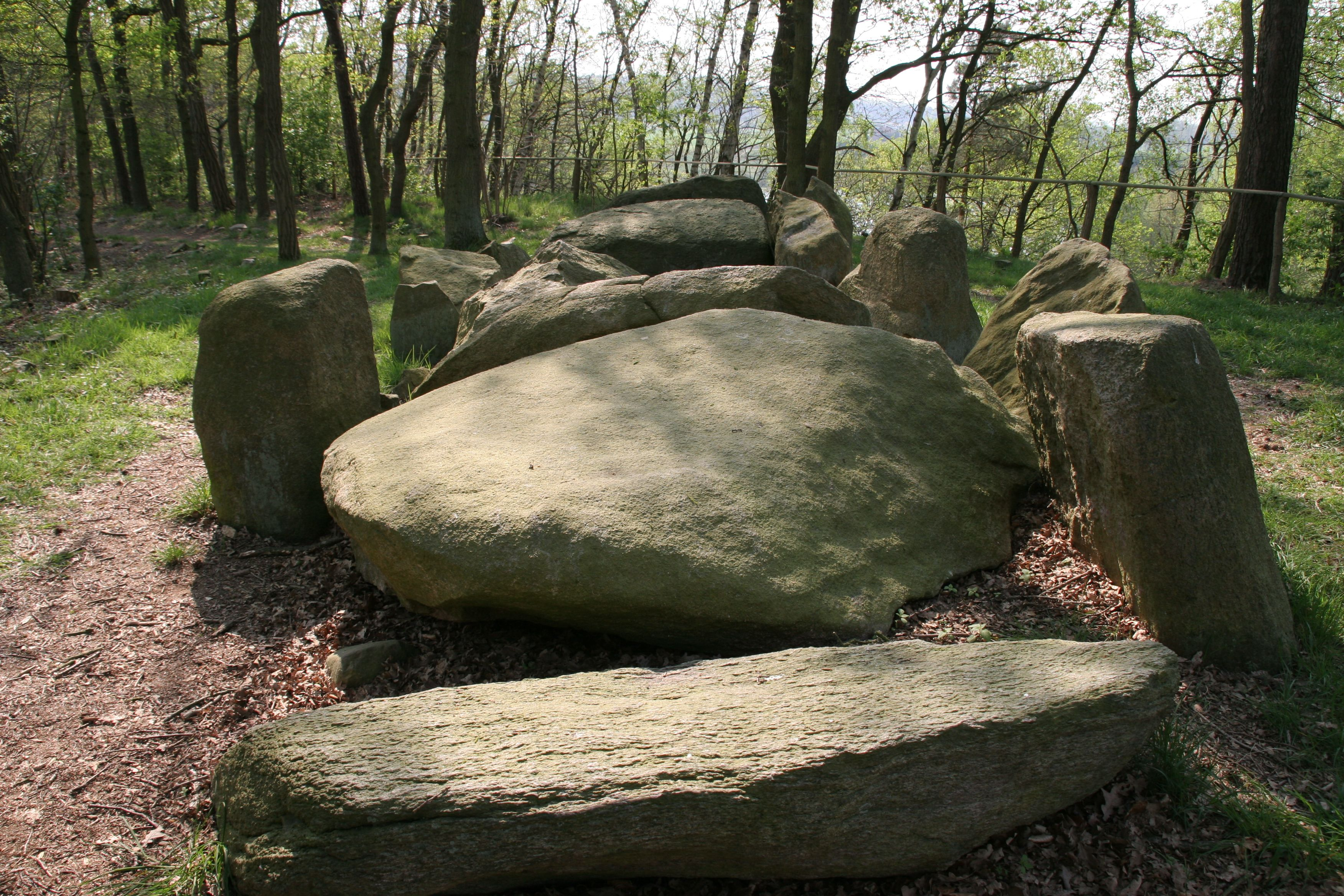
Megalithic chambered tomb "Darpvenner Steine II"

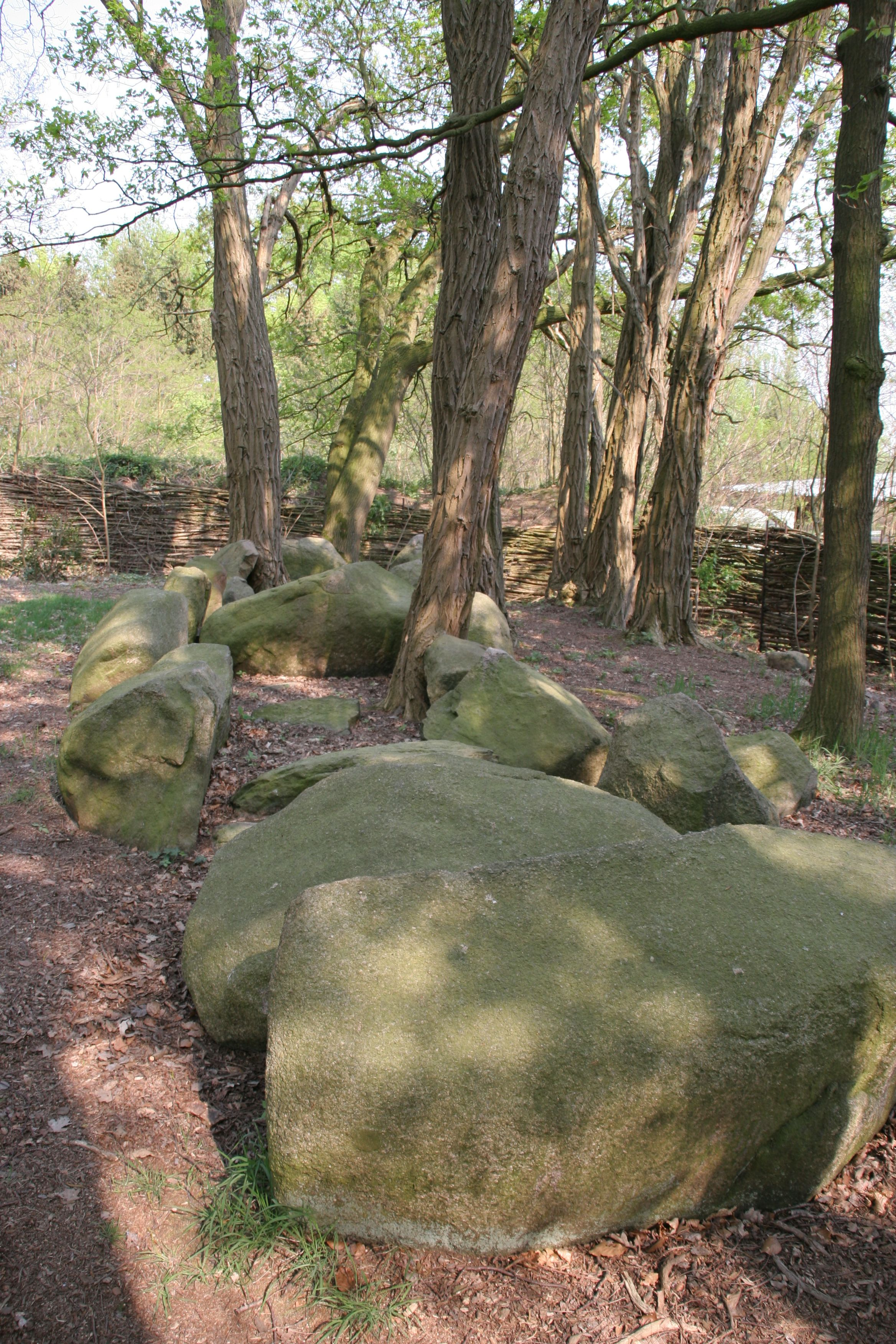
Megalithic chambered tomb "Darpvenner Steine III"

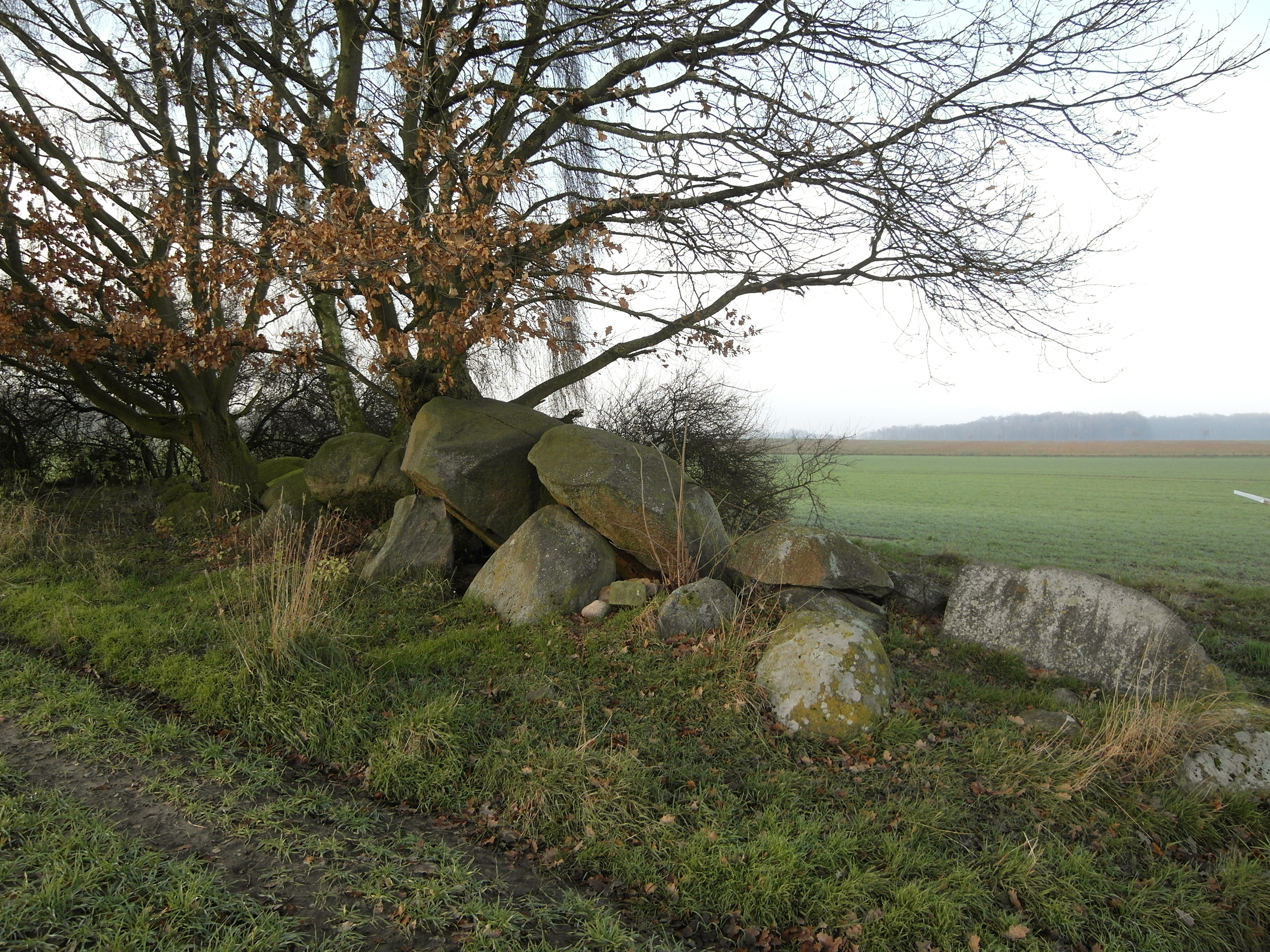
Megalithic chambered tomb "Driehauser Steine"

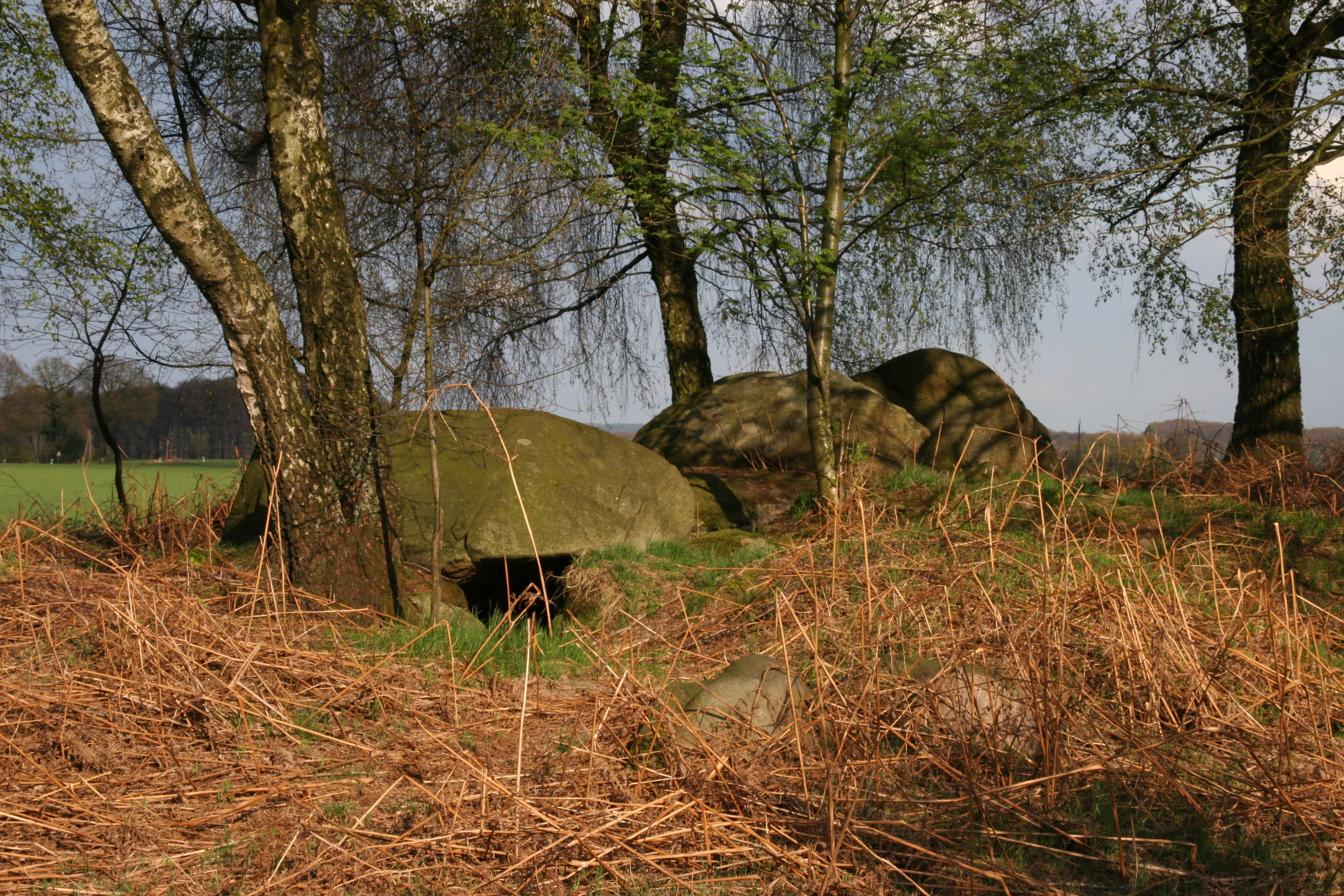
Megalithic chambered tomb "Dübberort I"

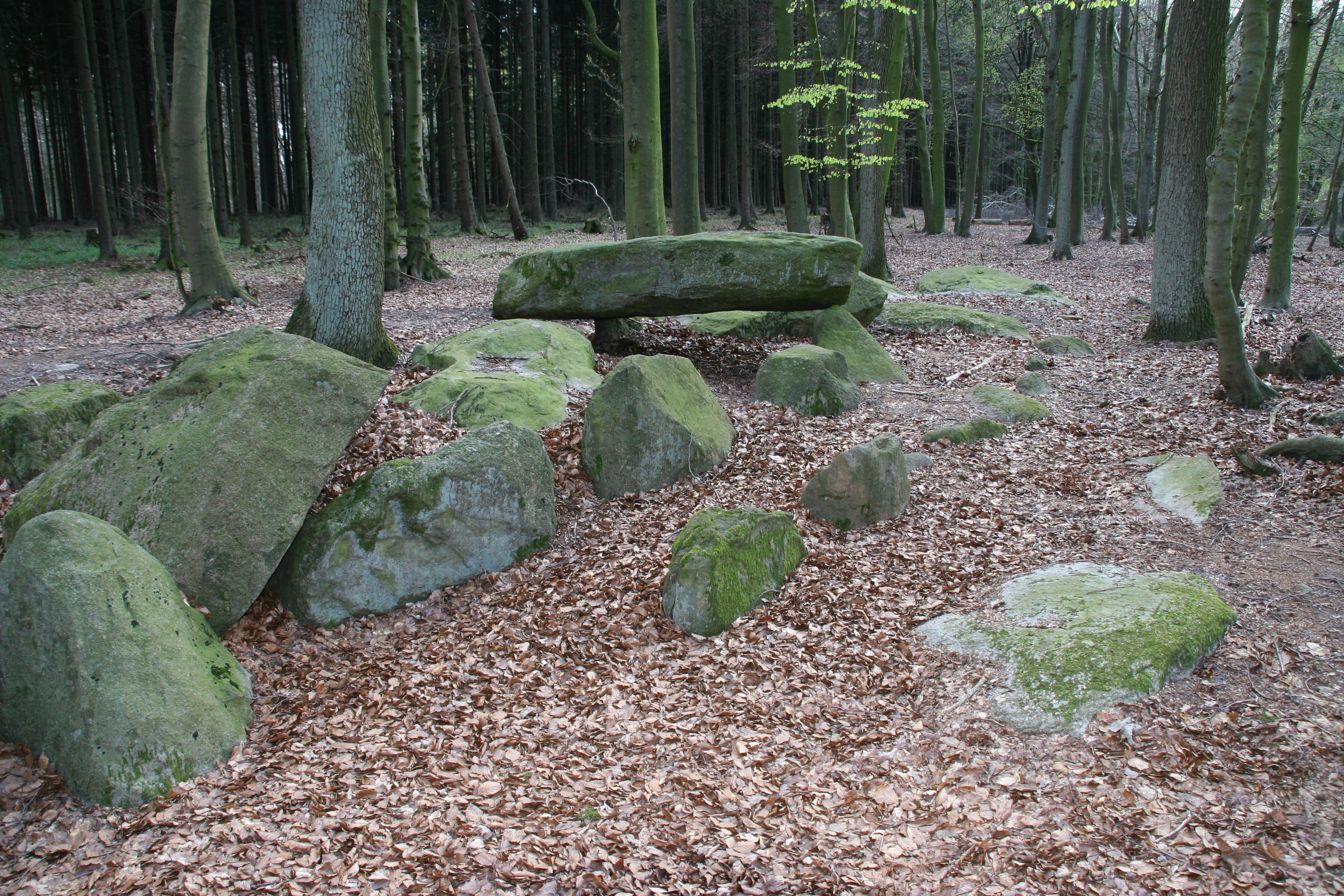
Megalithic chambered tomb "Dübberort II"

== International relations ==
Ostercappeln is twinned with:

- Bolbec, France, since 1966

== Sons and daughters of Ostercappeln ==
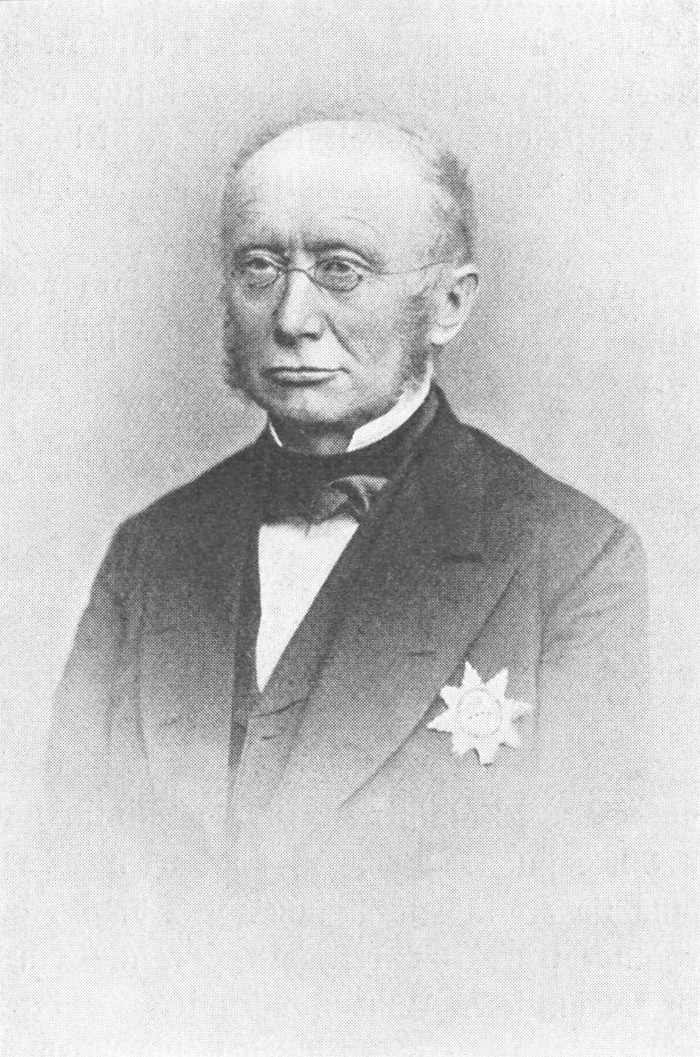
Ludwig Windthorst, 1872

- Johann Ernst Hanxleden (1681–1732), Jesuit priest and missionary, Sanskrit scholar, Malayalam poet, worked in India
- Ludwig Windthorst (1812–1891), politician, notable opponent of Chancellor Otto von Bismarck.

=== Sport ===
- Michael Hohnstedt (born 1988), German footballer, played over 340 games
- Timo Beermann (born 1990), German footballer, played over 230 games
- Moritz Heyer (born 1995), German footballer, played over 270 games
