= Currency of Germany =

List of current and historical currency of Germany

This is a list of current and historical currency of Germany. The sole currency of Germany has been the Euro since 2002.

== List ==
Currency	Area	Date created	Date abolished
Euro	Germany	1999	current currency
Deutsche Mark	Germany (unified); West Germany	1990 (unified); 1948 (West Germany)	2002
East German mark	East Germany	1948	1990
Saar franc	(Saar Protectorate) Saarland	1947	1959
Saar mark	(Saar Protectorate) Saarland	1947	1947
AM-Mark	Allied-occupied Germany	1944	1948
Reichsmark	Allied-occupied Germany; Nazi Germany; Weimar Republic	1924	1948
German Rentenmark	Weimar Republic	1923	1924
German Papiermark	Weimar Republic; German Empire	1914	1923
German gold mark	German Empire	1873	1914
Vereinsthaler	(North German Confederation) North German states	1857	1873
South German gulden	South German states	1754	1873
North German thaler	(North German Confederation) North German states	1690	1873
Hamburg mark	Hamburg	1619	1873
