= Mark (currency) =

Currency, coin, or unit of account

Mark
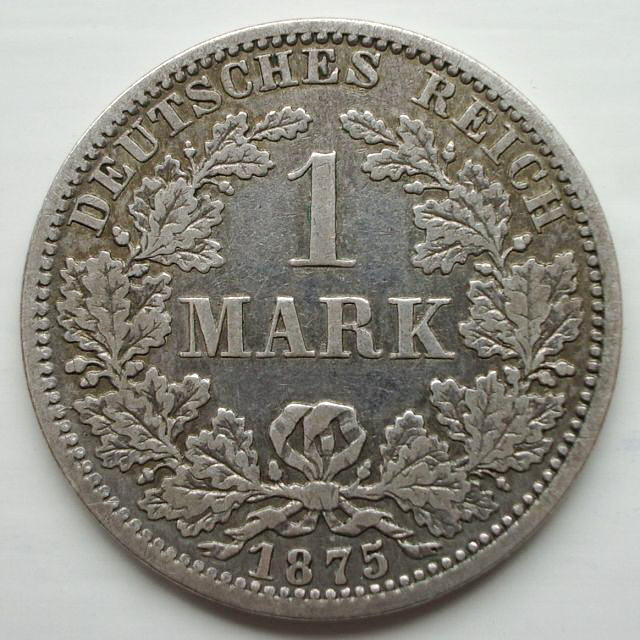
- 1 German gold mark, 1875

Units of account
- Plural: Marks
- Subunit
- 1/100: subunit

Demographics
- User(s): Various

The mark was a currency or unit of account in many states. It is named for the mark unit of weight. The word mark comes from a merging of three Germanic words, Latinised in 9th-century post-classical Latin as marca, marcha, marha or marcus. It was a measure of weight mainly for gold and silver, commonly used throughout Europe and often equivalent to 8 troy ounces (250 g). Considerable variations, however, occurred throughout the Middle Ages.

As of 2022 the only circulating currency named "mark" is the Bosnia and Herzegovina convertible mark.

== List of currencies named "mark" or similar ==
"Mark" can refer

- to one of the following historical German currencies:
  - Since the 11th century: the Kölner Mark, used in the Electorate of Cologne;
  - 1319: the Sundische Mark, minted and used by the North German Hanseatic city of Stralsund and various towns in Pomerania;
  - 1502: the Lübische Mark, a uniform coinage for the Wends (Germania Slavica) Hanseatic cities of Lübeck, Hamburg, Wismar, Lüneburg, Rostock, Stralsund, Anklam, among others, who joined the Wends Coinage Union (Wendischer Münzverein);
  - 1502: the Courant Mark, a uniform coinage in North German Hanseatic cities, part of the Wends Coinage Union (Wendischer Münzverein), and forerunner of the Reichsmark and the Deutsche Mark;
  - 1619–1873: the mark banco of Hamburg;
  - 1873–1914: the German gold mark, the currency of the German Empire;
  - 1914–1923: the German Papiermark;
  - 1923–1948: the German Rentenmark;
  - 1924–1948: the German Reichsmark;
  - 1944–1948: the military mark of the Allied occupying forces;
  - 1947: the Saar mark;
  - 1948–1990: the East German mark;
  - 1948–2002: the German mark, also called Deutsche Mark or D-Mark, and abbreviated DM;
- or to one of the other following historical currencies:
  - the merk Scots, an early-modern Scottish silver coin;
  - the Swedish mark, minted 1532–1776 but used as counting unit from medieval time;
  - 1860–2002: the Finnish markka;
  - 1884–1911: the New Guinean mark;
  - 1884–1915: the German South West African mark;
  - 1916–1918: the South West African mark;
  - 1917–1924: the Polish mark;
  - 1918–1927: the Estonian mark;
- or, since 1998, to the Bosnia and Herzegovina convertible mark.

== England and Scotland ==
In England the "mark" never appeared as a coin but was only a unit of account. It was apparently introduced in the 10th century by the Danes. According to 19th-century sources, it was initially equivalent to 100 pence, but after the Norman Conquest of 1066, it was worth 160 pence (13 shillings and 4 pence), two-thirds of a pound sterling.

For example, in the 1347 accounts of Edward III setting the rates of pay of military officers to be retained in times of peace, the rates are commonly given in marks, and those which are given in £sd correspond to multiples of marks: £10/13/4 = 16 marks, 46/8 = 3 1/2 marks, and 40/0 = 3 marks.

In Scotland, the merk Scots was a silver coin, issued first in 1570 and afterwards in 1663. It was originally worth 13 s. 6 d., later increased to 14 s..

== Germany ==
=== Early use ===
Originally, Mark denoted a mass unit of approximately 234 g (8.3 oz). The mark used in the market of Cologne (Cologne mark: 233.856 g, 8.2490 oz) was used to define the value of the official gold and silver currencies of the Holy Roman Empire including the Reichsthaler silver coin. In 1566, a Reichsthaler was introduced of which 9 were to be minted from a Cologne mark of fine silver.

In northern Germany (especially Hamburg and Lübeck) as well as in much of trade in the Baltic region, the customary unit of account was the mark valued at 1/3 of a Reichsthaler. Marks were rarely minted, though. Instead, schilling coins were minted with 48 schillings representing one Reichsthaler; i.e. 16 schillings equaled one mark.

To prevent debasement of the currency by the influx of adulterated coins, the Hamburger Bank was founded in 1619. It was modeled after the example of the Bank of Amsterdam. Both these banks established a stable money of account. The Hamburg unit of account was the mark banco. It was credited in exchange for the sale of bullion or by way of credit against collateral. No coins or banknotes were issued, but accounts were opened showing a credit balance. The account holders could use their credit balances by remittances to other accounts or by drawing bills of exchange against them. These bills circulated and could be transferred by endorsement, and were accepted as payment. They could also be redeemed. This currency proved to be very stable.

=== 19th century ===
1877 German 20 Mark gold coin, Wilhelm I era

Following German unification in 1871, the country adopted the German gold mark (officially known just as the "mark") as its currency in 1873. The name was taken from the mark banco. Initially, the coins and banknotes of the various predecessor currencies, such as the thaler, the kreuzer, and the guilder, continued to circulate, and were treated as fixed multiples of the new unit of account, similarly to the introduction period of the euro between 1999 and 2002. Coins denominated in gold marks were first issued in 1871, and gradually replaced the old coins. The mark banco was converted into the new gold mark at par. The Bank of Hamburg was incorporated as the Hamburg subsidiary into the newly founded Reichsbank (established 1876), issuing banknotes denominated in gold marks.

=== 20th century ===
In 1914 the Reichsbank stopped demanding first-class collateral (e.g. good bills of exchange, covered bonds such as Pfandbriefe) when providing credit to borrowers. The gold mark became a weak currency, colloquially referred to as the paper mark (Papiermark), to finance the war effort. In 1918, the pre-war sound money policy was not re-established, and the continuing loose money policy resulted in inflation, and in 1923, in hyperinflation.

In late 1923 when the paper mark had become virtually worthless, it was replaced by a new currency, the Rentenmark (worth 1 trillion Papiermark). The new currency was issued by the newly established Rentenbank as credit to borrowers, but requiring collateral in the form of first-class claims to real estate.

In 1924 the Reichsbank stopped providing unrestricted credit against worthless financial bills, and pegged its new currency, the Reichsmark, to the stable Rentenmark. The Reichsbank rationed its lending, so that the Reichsmark remained at par with the stable Rentenmark. The currencies continued to exist in parallel, and were both abbreviated RM.

The original intention was to withdraw the Rentenmark by 1934, but the National Socialist government decided to continue to use the Rentenmark, which enjoyed a considerable trust due to its stability. Nevertheless, the National Socialist government deliberately overissued both currencies to finance infrastructure investments by the state, and expanded government employment and expenditure on items such as armaments. By 1935, laws limiting increases of prices, wages, and rents were needed to suppress inflation. Enormous extra taxes, charged on real estate owners (RM 1 bn in 1936), and on the occasion of the antisemitic November Pogrom (Kristallnacht), on Jewish Germans (RM 1 bn in 1938), could not stabilise the economy for long. The start of World War II was used to justify general price controls and rationing. Thus inflation was officially hidden, and was expressed as ever-growing aggregate savings of the population, which could only spend its earnings on limited rations of goods at artificially low prices. However, inflation could clearly be seen in the rising prices on the black market. During the war, the German economy was supported by war booty taken from occupied countries, continuing to some extent until 1944. By the end of the war, the oversupply of banknotes and coins (RM 3.9 bn in 1933, RM 60 bn in 1945) became obvious, openly showing up in inflated black market prices.

From 1944 the Allies printed occupation marks (also called military marks), decreeing that these were to be accepted at par with the Rentenmark and the Reichsmark. Banknotes worth 15 to 18 bn military marks were issued for purchases by the occupying forces in Germany, and for soldiers' wages. In June 1948, military marks were demonetised as part of the West German and East German currency reforms.

In June 1947 the French occupying force in the Saar Protectorate introduced the Saar mark, which was at par with the Rentenmark and the Reichsmark. In November 1947, it was replaced by the Saar franc.

On 21 June 1948 the Deutsche Mark (German mark) was introduced by the Bank deutscher Länder in the western zones of occupation in Germany, which then formed West Germany.

On 23 June 1948 the Deutsche Emissions- und Girobank ("German bank of issue and giro centre") of the Soviet occupation zone (which later formed East Germany) followed suit, issuing its own Deutsche Mark (colloquially referred to as the East German mark or Ostmark), later officially called Mark der Deutschen Notenbank (1964–1967) and then Mark der DDR (1968–1990). It was replaced by the (West) German mark when Germany was reunified in 1990.

=== Replacement by the euro ===
The German mark was replaced by the euro, first as an accounting currency on 1 January 1999, at a conversion rate of 1.95583 marks per euro. Thereafter, the mark-denominated notes and coins represented the euro at that conversion rate, and remained legal tender until 1 January 2002, when they were replaced by euro notes and coins.

Germany mints its own German euro coins, but all euro coins are legal tender throughout the Eurozone.

The remaining convertible mark of Bosnia and Herzegovina is a currency that officially replaced the German mark as de facto currency of the ruptured economy and hyper-inflation of local divided currencies after the Bosnian war, pegged to the German mark 1:1 at the time, and further pegged to the euro at the rate at which German mark was replaced, i.e. 1 EUR = 1.95583 BAM.

== See also ==
- Mark (unit)
- Coins of the pound sterling
- Markland
