= Reichsmark =

Currency of Germany from 1924 to 1945

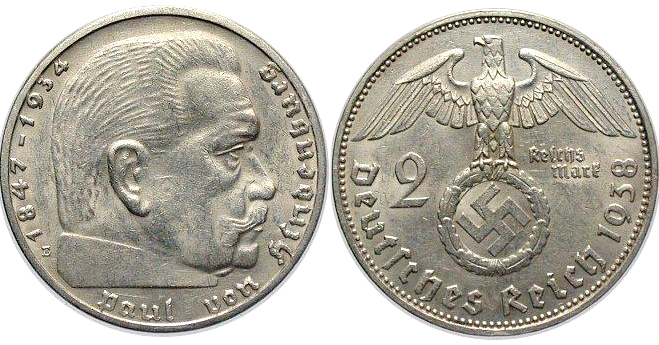
- 2 ℛ︁ℳ︁—coin depicting Paul von Hindenburg

Units of account
- Plural: Reichsmark
- Symbol: ℛ︁ℳ︁
- Subunit
- 1/100: Reichspfennig
- Plural
- Reichspfennig: Reichspfennig

Denominations
- Banknotes: 5 ℛ︁ℳ︁, 10 ℛ︁ℳ︁, 20 ℛ︁ℳ︁ 50 ℛ︁ℳ︁, 100 ℛ︁ℳ︁, 1,000 ℛ︁ℳ︁
- Coins: 1 ℛ︁₰, 2 ℛ︁₰, 5 ℛ︁₰, 10 ℛ︁₰, 50 ℛ︁₰, 1 ℛ︁ℳ︁, 2 ℛ︁ℳ︁, 3 ℛ︁ℳ︁, 5 ℛ︁ℳ︁

Demographics
- Date of introduction: 1924
- Replaced: German Rentenmark
- Date of withdrawal: 20 June 1948 (Trizone); 23 June 1948 (Soviet occupation zone of Germany)
- Replaced by: AM-Mark; Deutsche Mark (West Germany); East German mark (East Germany)
- User(s): Weimar Republic; Nazi Germany; Allied-occupied Germany

Issuance
- Central bank: Reichsbank

Valuation
- Pegged by: Belgian franc, Bohemian and Moravian koruna, Bulgarian lev, Danish krone, French franc, Italian lira, Luxembourg franc, Dutch gulden, Norwegian krone, Polish złoty, Serbian dinar, Slovak koruna (1939–1945), Ukrainian karbovanets in World War II as similar rates
- This infobox shows the latest status before this currency was rendered obsolete.

The Reichsmark (German: [ˈʁaɪçsˌmaʁk]; sign: ℛ︁ℳ︁; abbreviation: RM) was the currency of Germany from 1924 until the fall of Nazi Germany in 1945, and in the American, British and French occupied zones of Germany, until 20 June 1948. The Reichsmark was then replaced by the Deutsche Mark, to become the currency of West Germany and then all of Germany after the 1990 reunification. The Reichsmark was used in the Soviet occupation zone in Germany until 23 June 1948, where it was replaced by the East German mark. The Reichsmark was subdivided into 100 Reichspfennig (Rpf or ℛ︁₰). The mark is an ancient Germanic weight measure, traditionally a half pound, later used for several coins; Reich ('realm') comes from the official name for the German state from 1871 to 1945, Deutsches Reich.

== History ==
=== Establishment ===
The Reichsmark was introduced in 1924 as a permanent replacement for the Papiermark. This was necessary due to the 1920s German inflation which had reached its peak in 1923. The exchange rate between the old Papiermark and the Reichsmark was 1 ℛ︁ℳ︁ = 10^{12} ℳ︁ (one trillion in American English and French, one billion in German and other European languages and British English of the time; see long and short scale). To stabilize the economy and to smooth the transition, the Papiermark was not directly replaced by the Reichsmark, but by the Rentenmark, an interim currency backed by the Deutsche Rentenbank, owning industrial and agricultural real estate assets. The Reichsmark was put on the gold standard at the rate previously used by the German mark, with the U.S. dollar worth 4.20 ℛ︁ℳ︁.

=== Expansion outside the Reichsmark ===
During this period a number of shell companies were created and authorized to issue bonds outside the Reichsmark in order to finance state projects. Nominally exchangeable at a 1:1 rate for Reichsmarks but then discounted by the Reichsbank this created secret monetary expansion without formally renouncing the gold standard of the Reichsmark.

=== World War II ===
With the annexation of the Federal State of Austria by Germany in 1938, the Reichsmark replaced the Austrian schilling. During the Second World War, Germany established fixed exchange rates between the Reichsmark and the currencies of the occupied and allied countries, often set so as to give economic benefits to German soldiers and civilian contractors, who were paid their wages in local currency. The rates were as follows:

Currency	Date set	Value per 10 ℛ︁ℳ︁
Belgian franc	May 1940	Fr 100
Belgian franc	July 1940	Fr 125
Bohemia and Moravia crown	April 1939	K 100
Bulgarian lev	1940	Lev 333.33
Danish crown	1940	DKr 10
French franc	May 1940	Fr 200
Italian lira	1943	Lit 100
Luxembourg franc	May 1940	Fr 40
Luxembourg franc	July 1940	Fr 100
Dutch guilder	10 May 1940	ƒ6.66
Dutch guilder	17 July 1940	ƒ7.57
Norwegian crown	1940	NKr 13.33
Norwegian crown	?	NKr 17.50
Polish złoty	1939	zł 20
Sterling (Channel Islands)	1940	£0 17s 4 1/2d
Croatian kuna	April 1941	Kn 200
Slovak crown	1939	Sk 100
Slovak crown	1 October 1940	Sk 116.20
Finnish mark	1941	FMk 197.44

=== Post-war ===
After the Second World War, the Reichsmark continued to circulate in Germany, but with new banknotes (Allied Occupation Marks) printed in the US and in the Soviet zones, as well as with coins (without swastikas). Inflation in the final months of the war had reduced the value of the Reichsmark from 2.50 ℛ︁ℳ︁ = $1US to 10 ℛ︁ℳ︁ = $1US and a barter economy emerged due to the rapid depreciation.

After V-E Day, the Reichsmark's value decreased to 200 per dollar. While for German civilians one Allied Occupation Mark was equivalent to one Reichsmark, soldiers selling things civilians wanted on the black market could receive Reichsmarks, exchange them for Allied Occupation Marks, then exchange Allied Occupation Marks at ten per dollar. A carton of American cigarettes the post exchange sold to soldiers for $0.50 was worth 150 marks or $15 to German civilians; matches were the change.

The Currency Reform of 1948 replaced the Reichsmark with the Deutsche Mark at a rate of 10:1 (1:1 for cash and current accounts) in June 1948 in the Trizone and later in the same year by the East German mark in the Soviet Occupation Zone (colloquially also "Ostmark", since 1968 officially "Mark der DDR"). The reform under the direction of Ludwig Erhard is considered the beginning of the West German economic recovery; however, the secret plan to introduce the Deutsche Mark in the Trizone was formulated by economist Edward A. Tenenbaum of the US military government, and was executed abruptly on 21 June 1948. Three days later, the new currency also replaced the Reichsmark in the three Western sectors of Berlin. In November 1945, the Reichsmark was superseded by the Second Austrian schilling in Austria. In 1947, the Saar mark, later replaced with the Saar franc, was introduced in the Saar.

== Coins ==
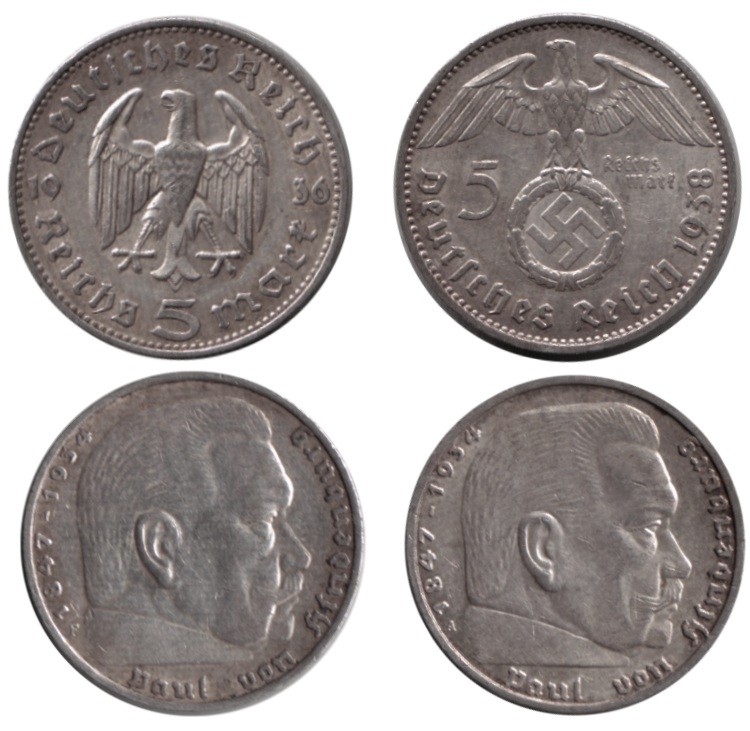
Reichsmark coins without (1936) and with (1938) the Nazi swastika

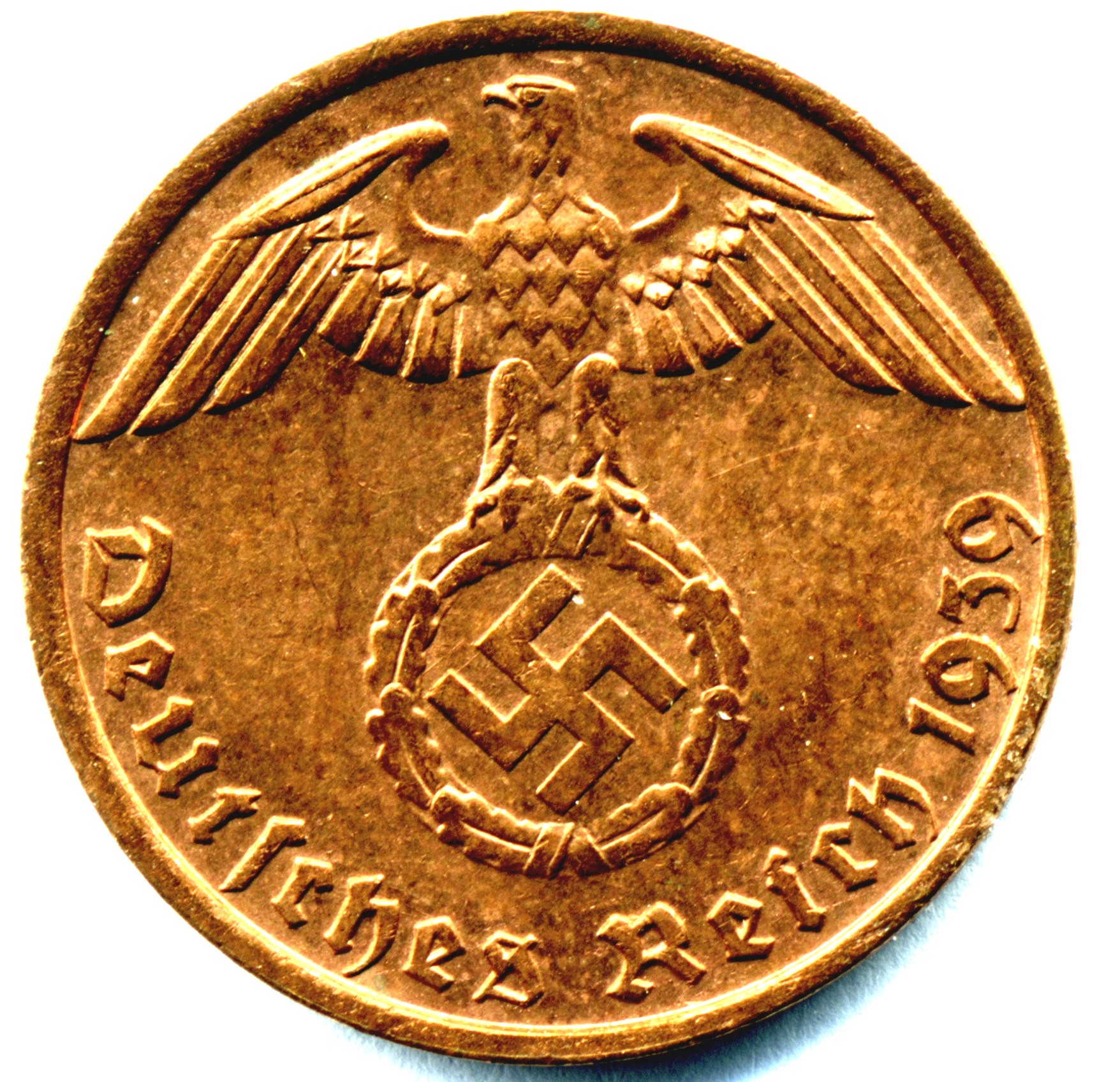
Prewar bronze Reichspfennig (obverse)

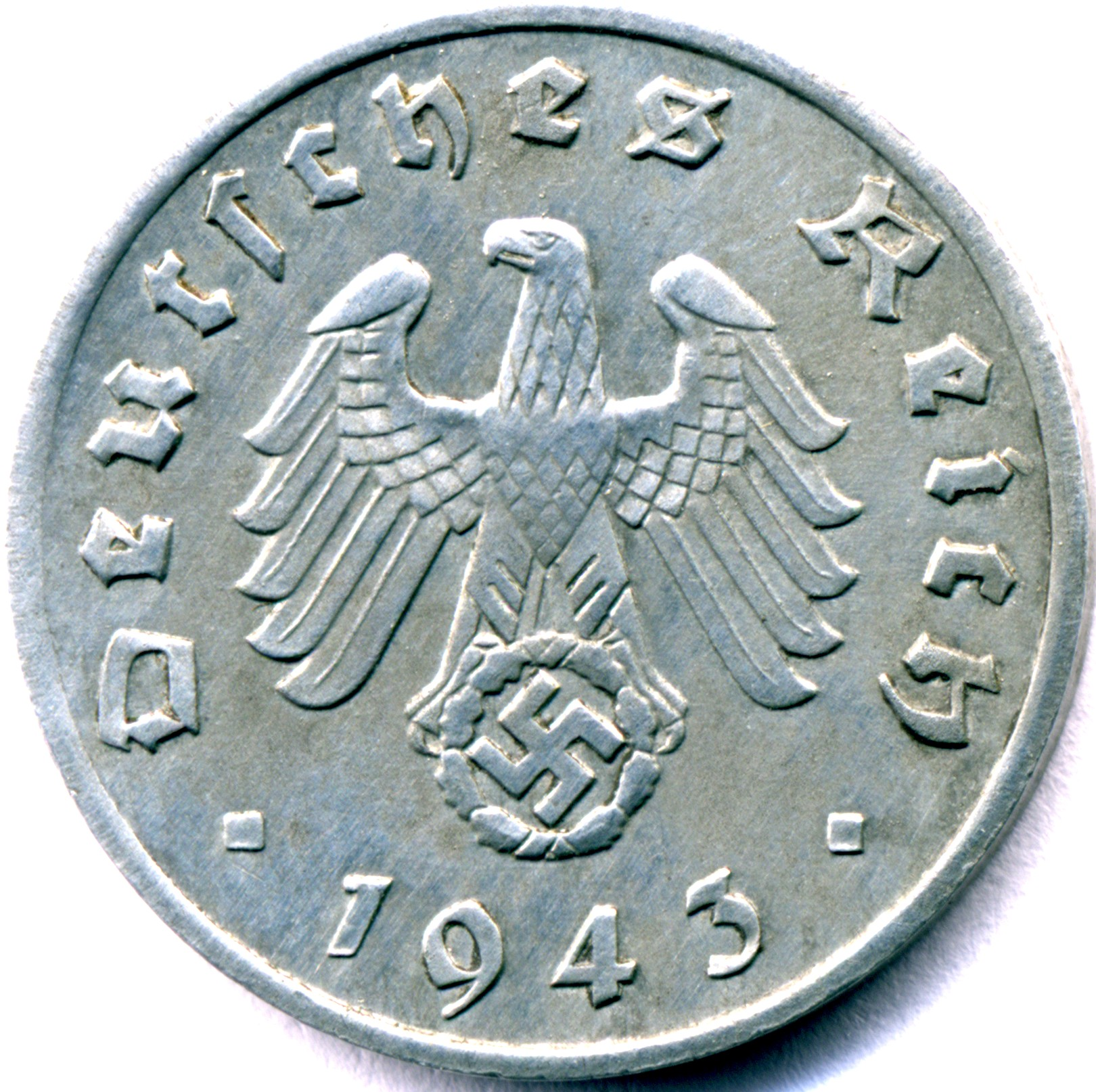
Wartime zinc Reichspfennig (obverse)

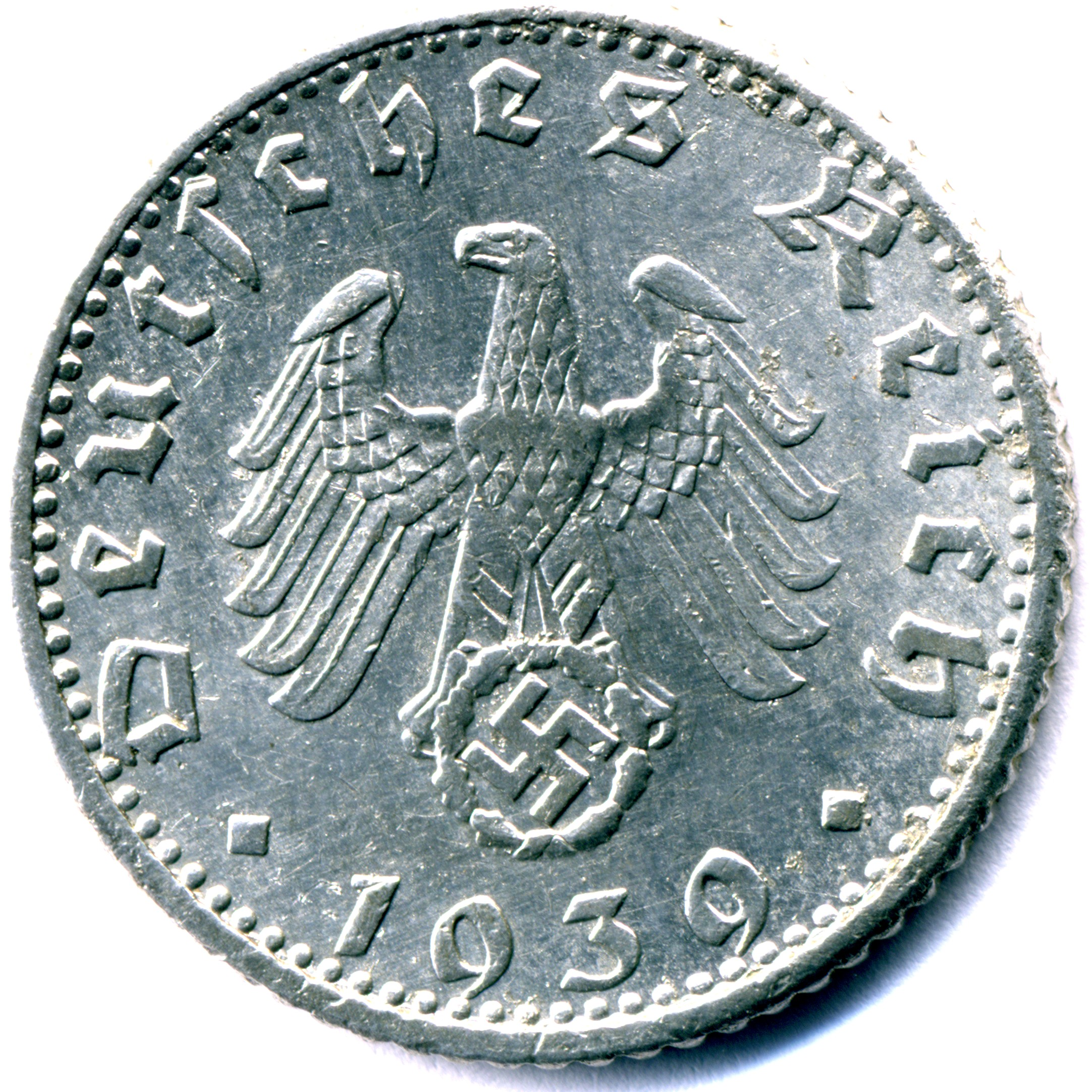
Aluminium 50 ℛ︁₰ coin (obverse)

=== Denominations ===
In 1924, coins were introduced in denominations of 1 ℛ︁₰, 2 ℛ︁₰, 5 ℛ︁₰, 10 ℛ︁₰, and 50 ℛ︁₰, and 1 ℳ︁ and 3 ℳ︁.

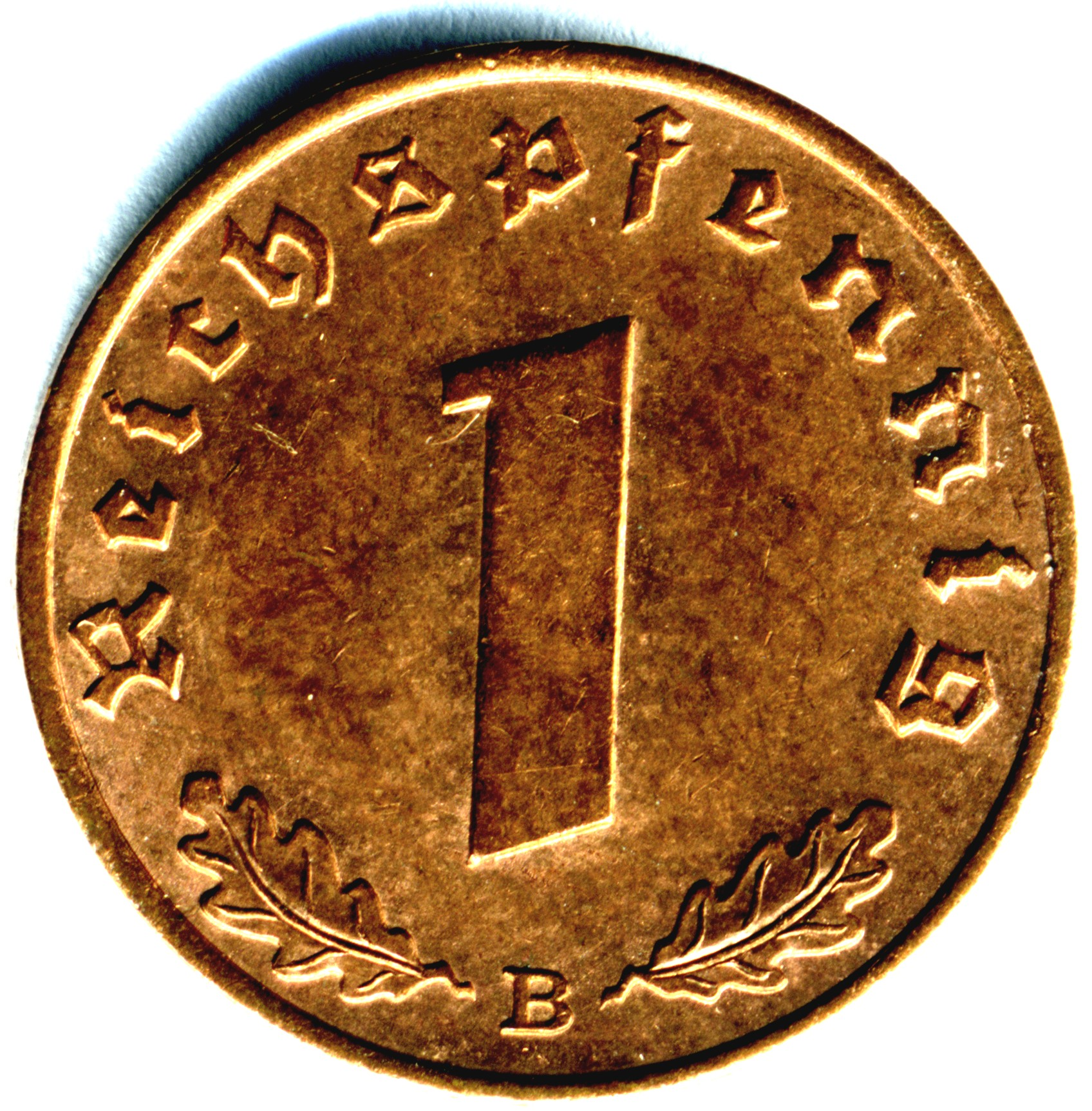
Prewar bronze 1 ℛ︁₰ (reverse). Made of pure bronze

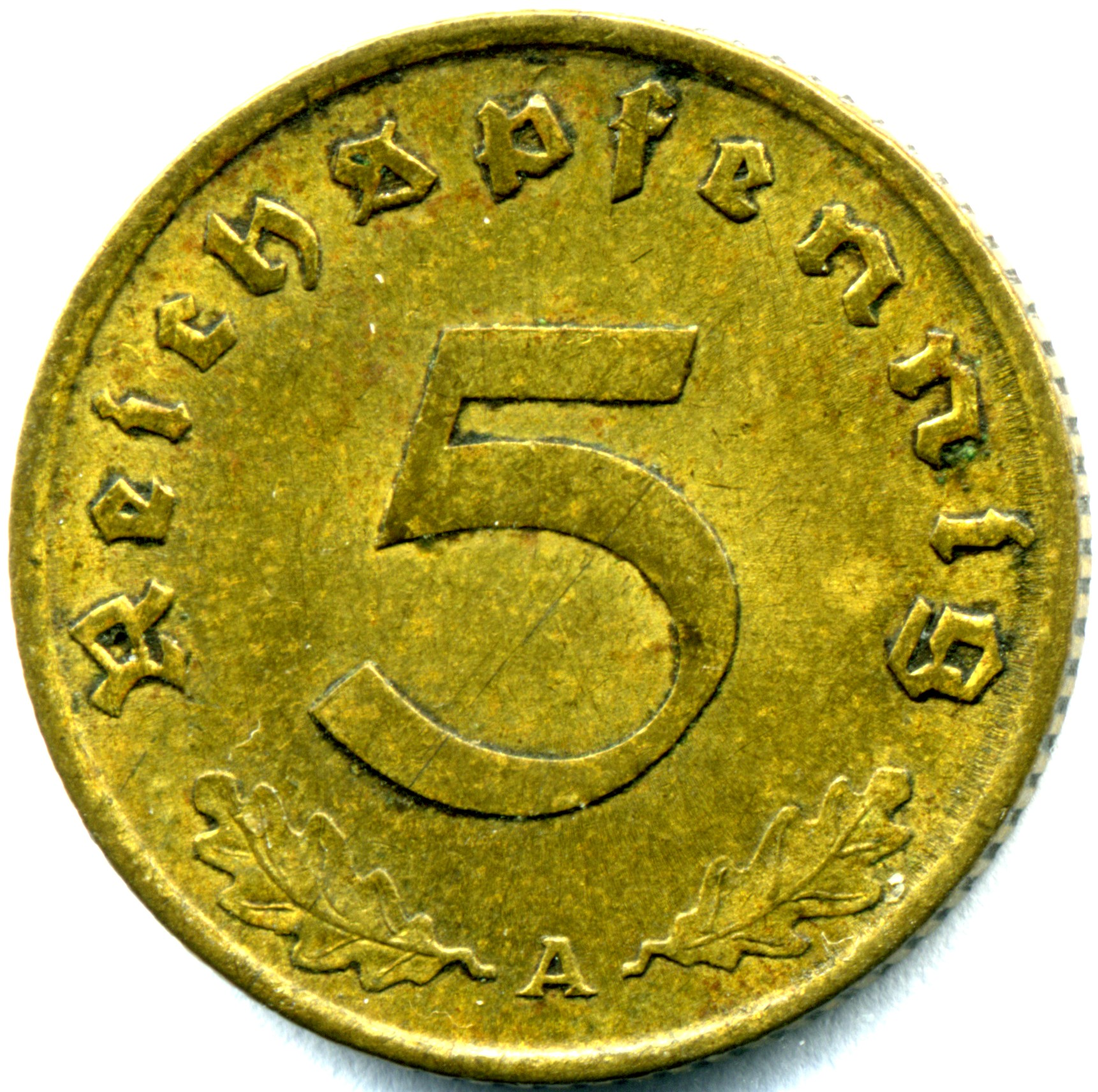
Prewar 5 ℛ︁₰ (reverse). Made of aluminium-bronze

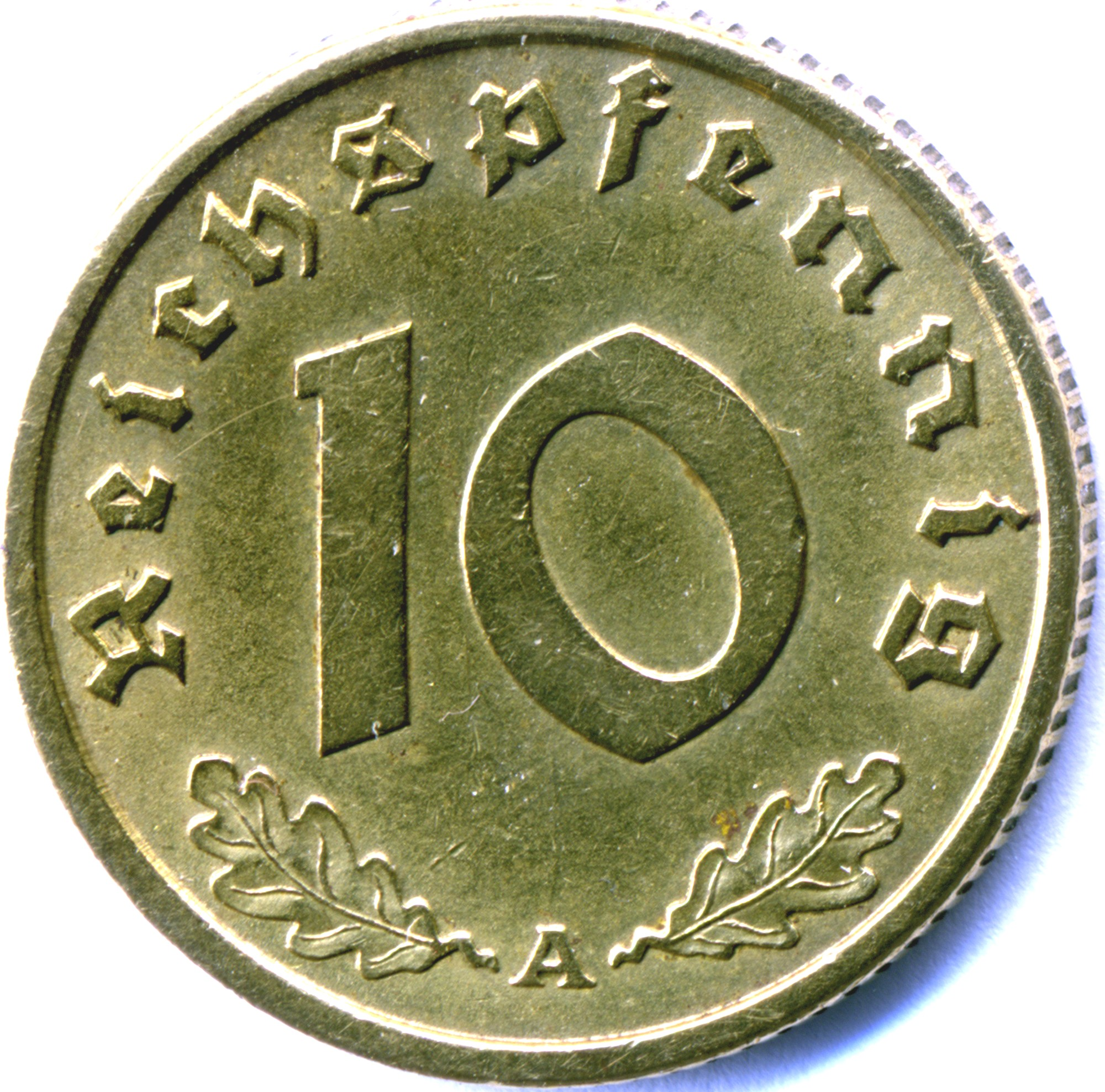
Prewar 10 ℛ︁₰ (reverse). Struck in the same aluminium-bronze as the 5 ℛ︁₰.

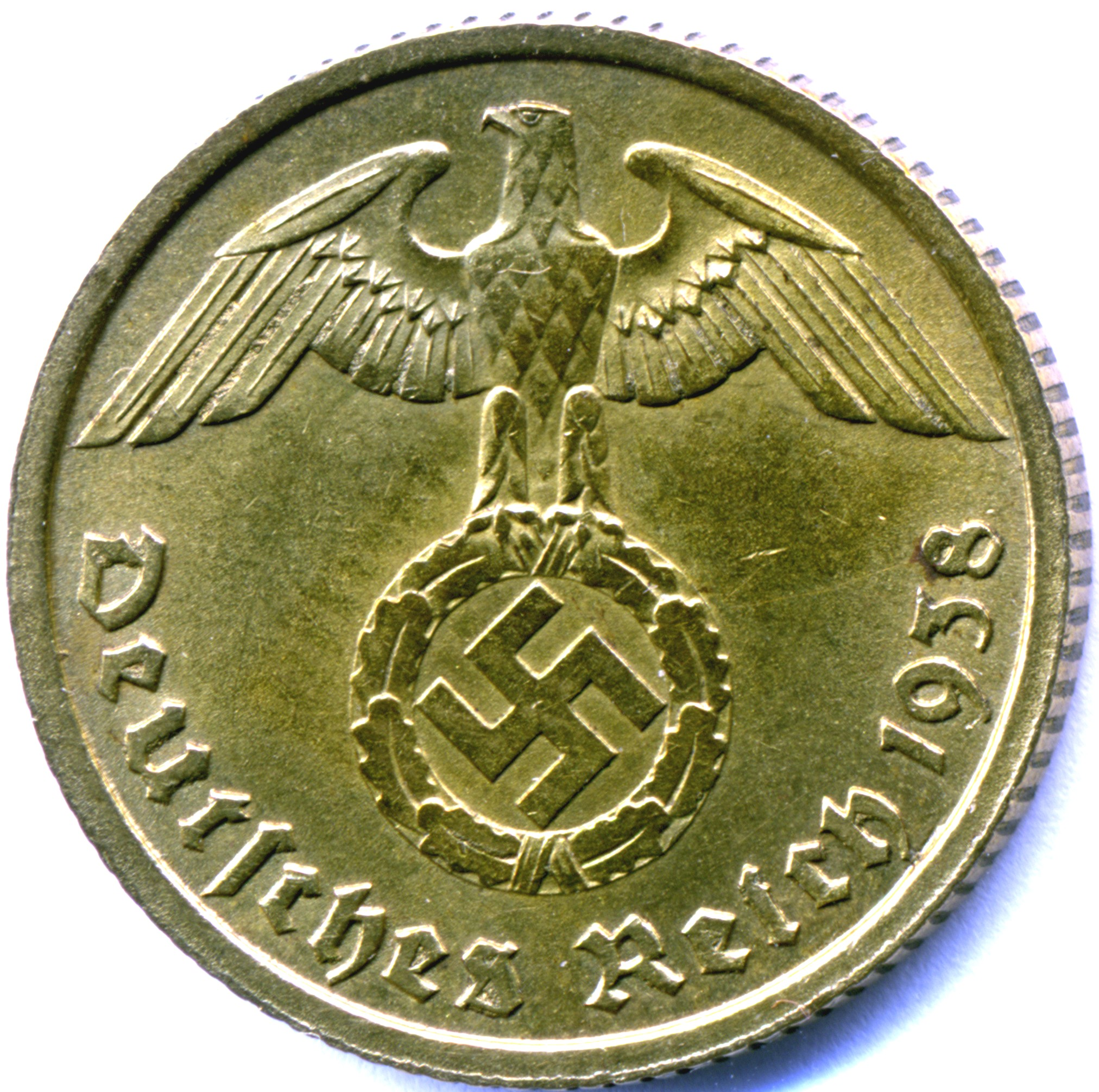
Prewar 10 ℛ︁₰ (obverse)
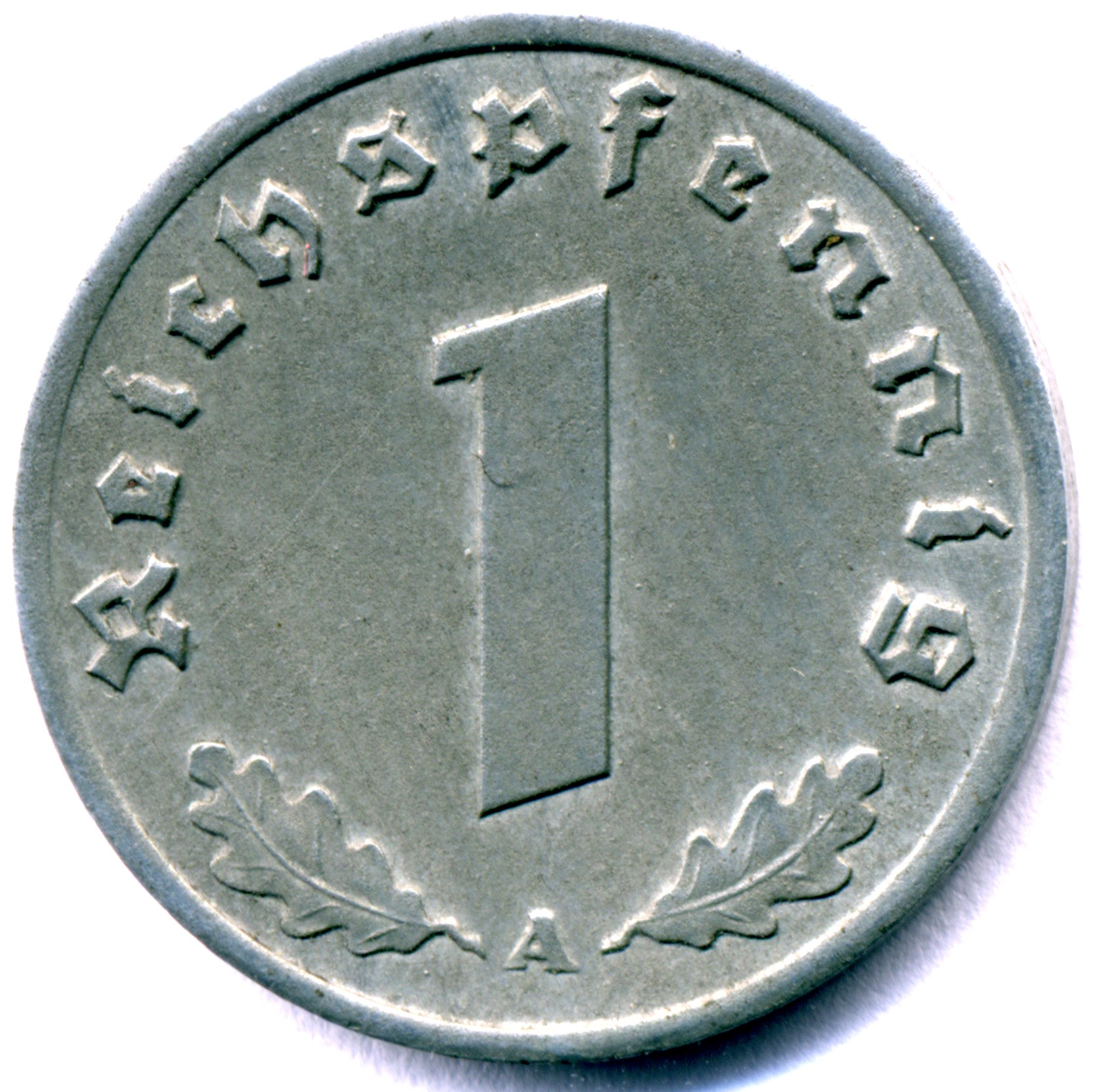
Wartime zinc 1 Reichspfennig (reverse)

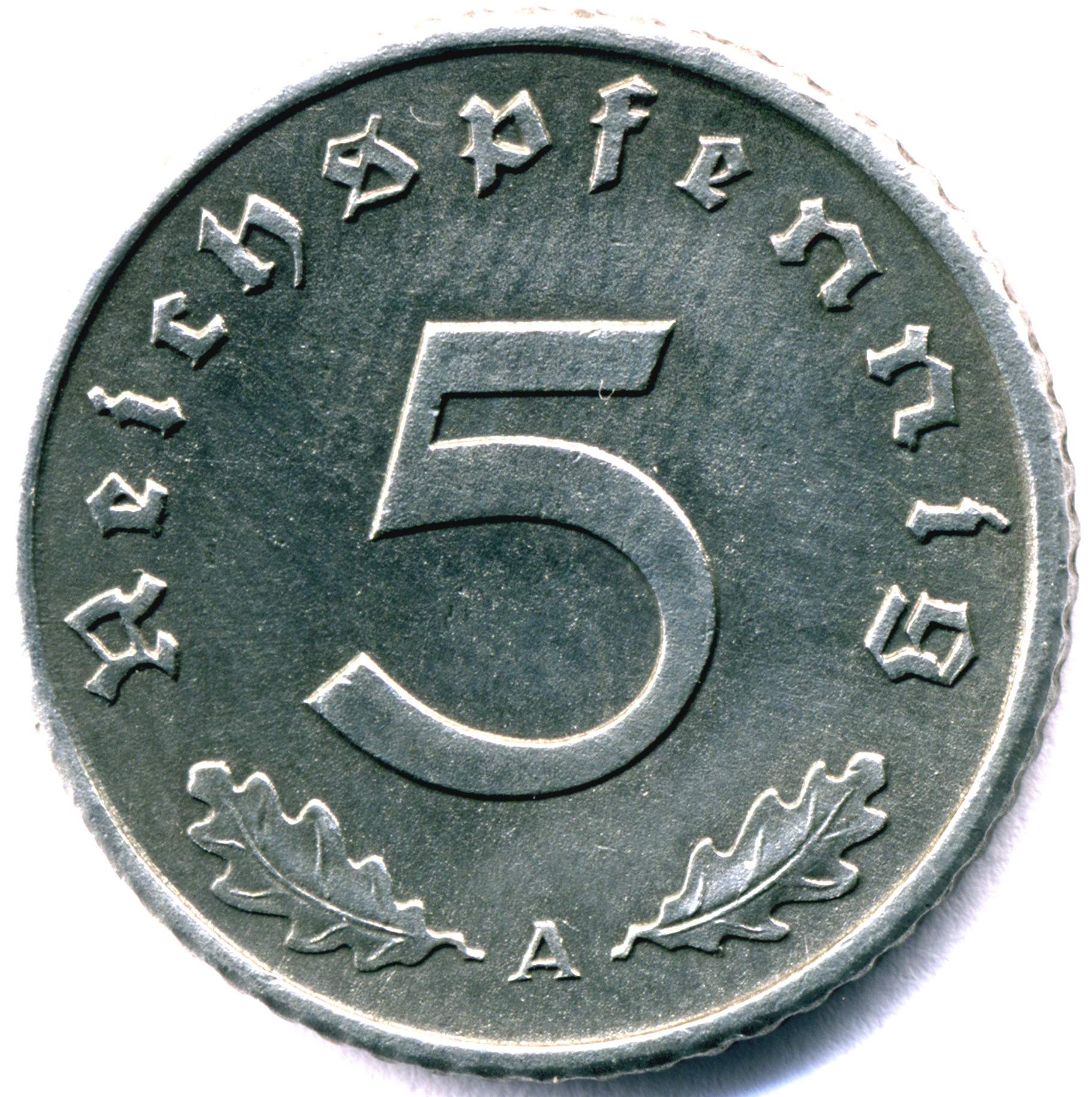
Wartime zinc 5 Reichspfennig (reverse)

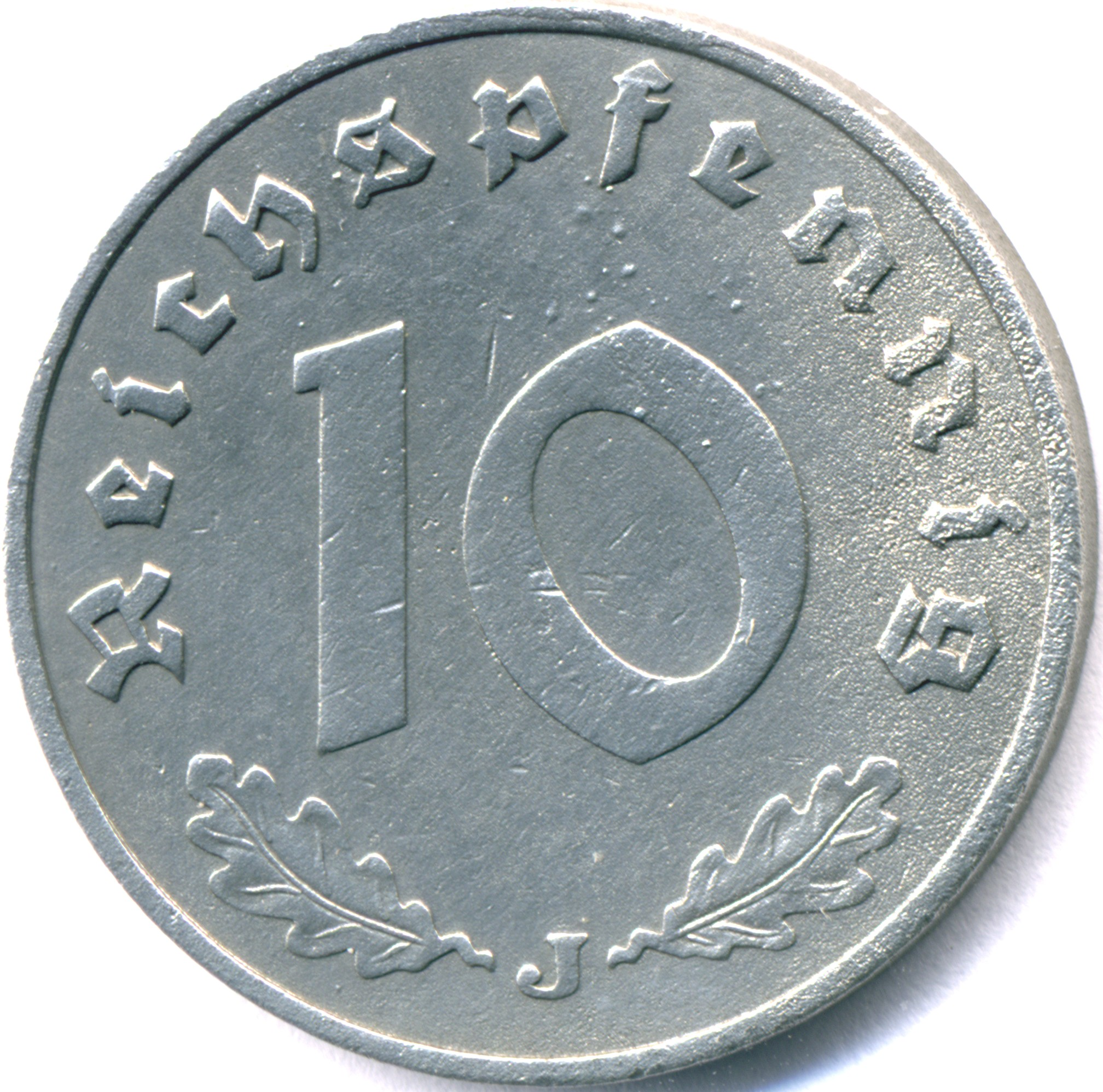
Wartime zinc 10 Reichspfennig (reverse)

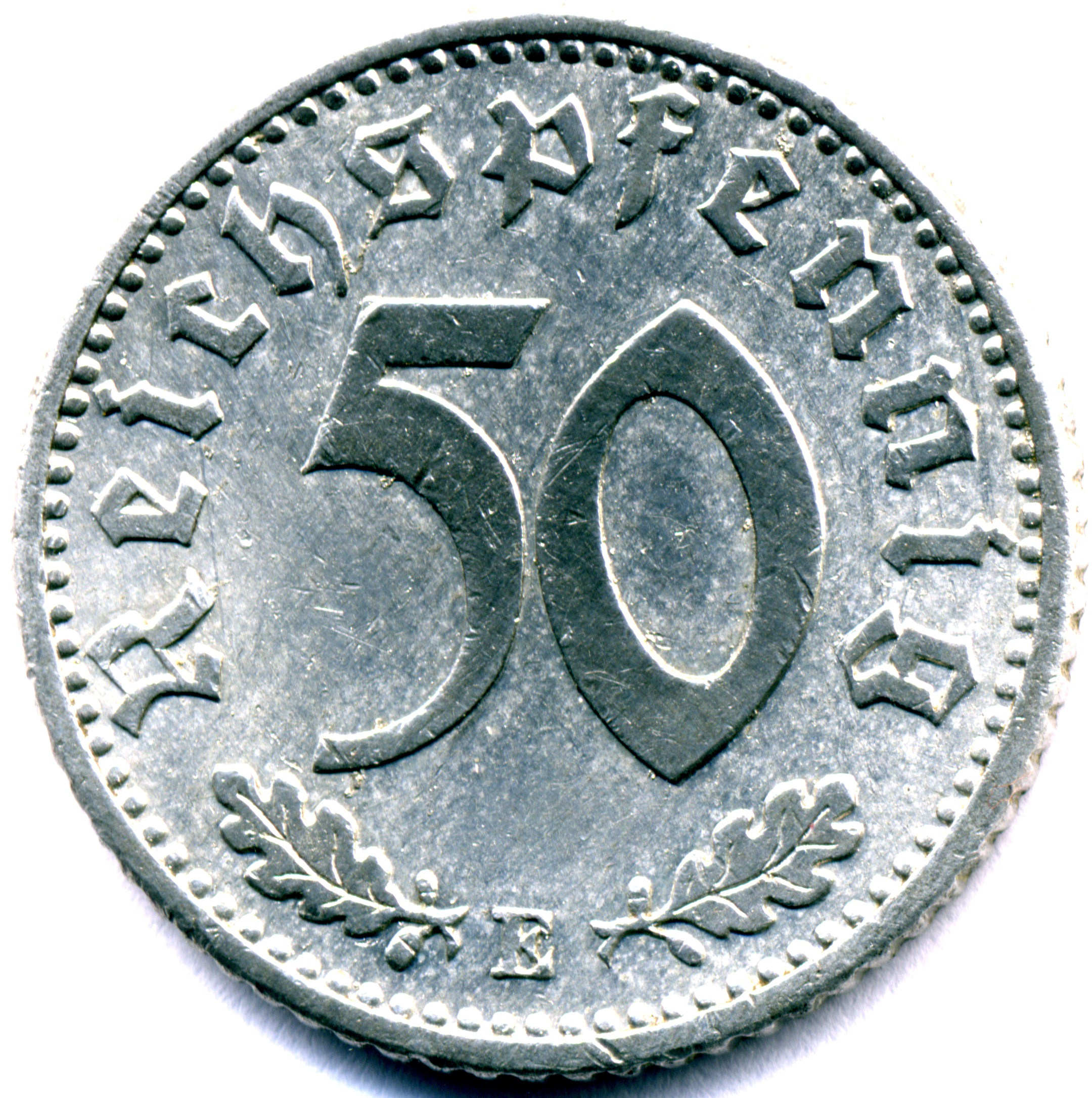
Aluminum 50 Reichspfennig coin (reverse)

=== 4 Reichspfennig ===
4 Reichspfennig coins were issued in 1932 as part of a failed attempt by the Reichskanzler Heinrich Brüning to reduce prices through use of 4 ℛ︁₰ pieces instead of 5 ℛ︁₰ coins. Known as the Brüningtaler or Armer Heinrich ('poor Heinrich'), they were demonetized the following year. See Brüningtaler (in German). The quality of the Reichsmark coins decreased more and more towards the end of World War II and misprints happened more frequently. Since the 4 ℛ︁₰ coin was only slightly larger than the 1 ℳ︁ coin and the imperial eagle looked similar, an attempt was made to pass it off as a 1-reichsmark coin by silvering the 4 ℛ︁₰ coin.

=== 10 Reichspfennig ===
10 Reichspfennig
- Nazi Germany
- Value: 10 Reichspfennig
- Mass: 3.52 g
- Diameter: 21 mm
- Thickness: 1.5 mm
- Edge: Plain
- Composition: 100% Zn
- Years of minting: 1940–1945

Obverse
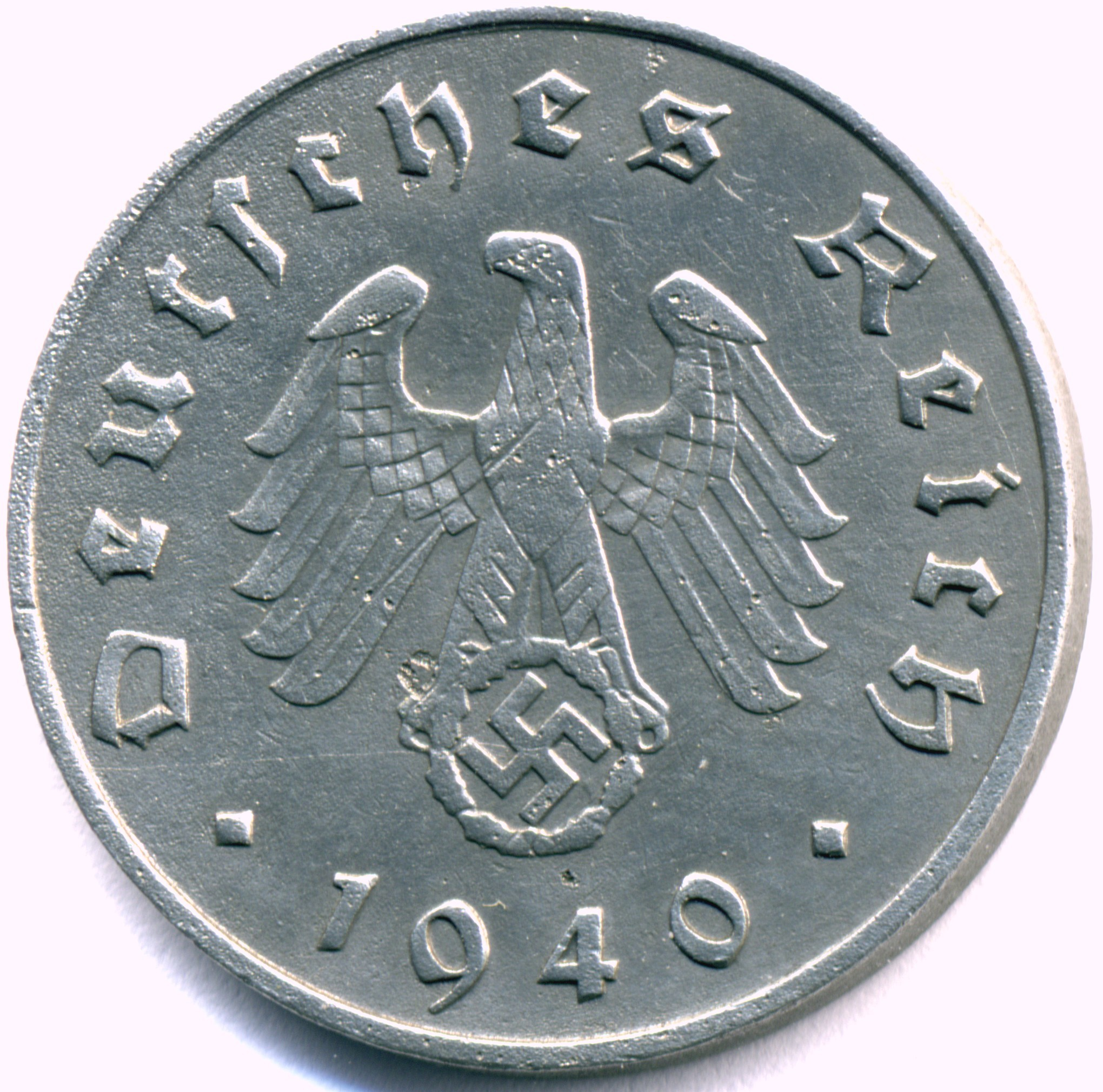
- Design: Reichsadler with swastika. Lettering: Deutsches Reich 1940

Reverse
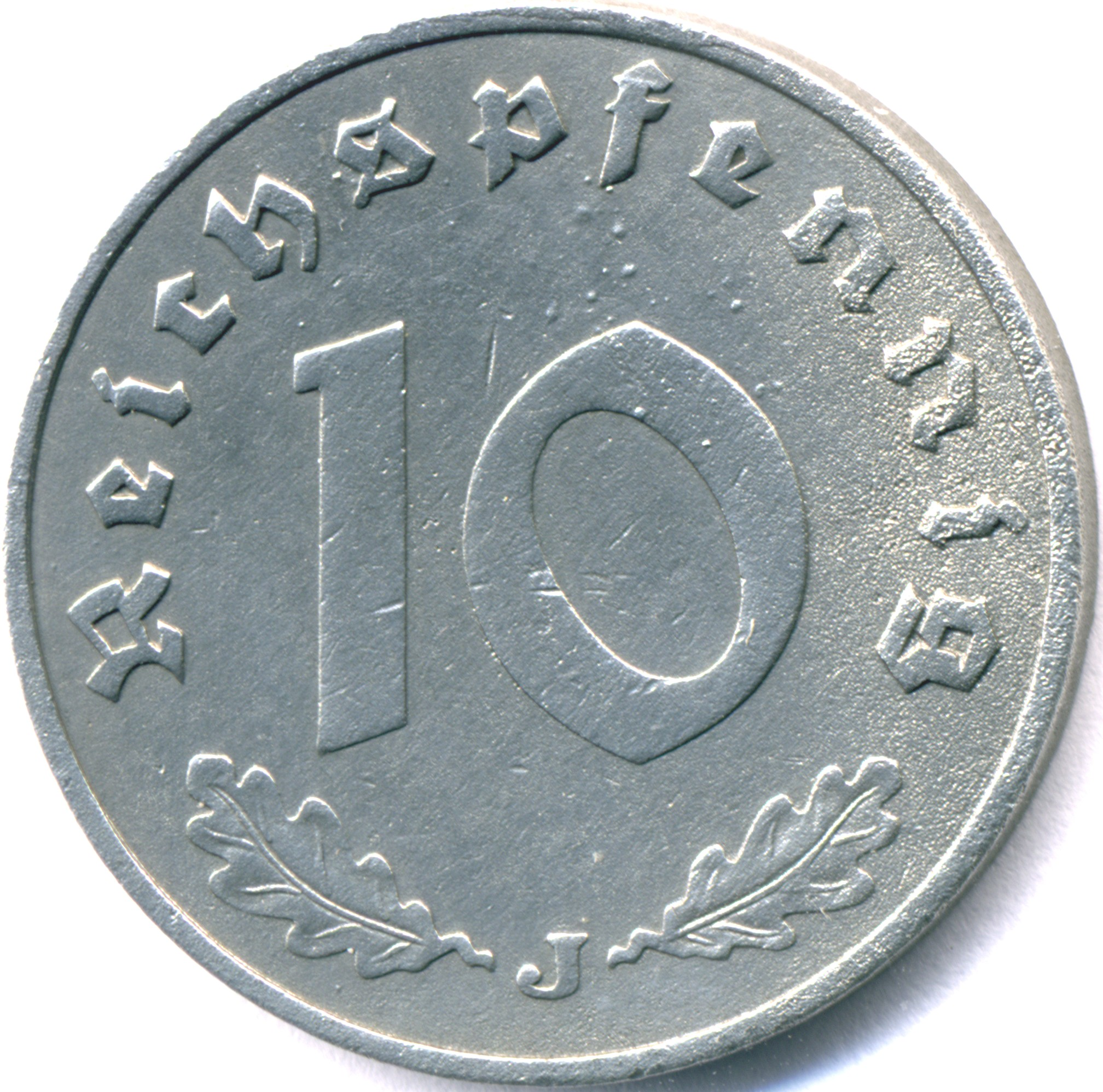
- Design: Denomination and two oak leaves. Mintmark below the denomination and between leaves. Lettering: 10 Reichspfennig J

The zinc 10 Reichspfennig coin was minted by Nazi Germany between 1940 and 1945 during World War II, replacing the aluminium-bronze version, which had a distinct golden colour. It is worth 1/10 or .10 of a Reichsmark. Made entirely of zinc, the 10 ℛ︁₰ is an emergency issue type, similar to the zinc 1 ℛ︁₰ and 5 ℛ︁₰, and the aluminium 50 ℛ︁₰ coins from the same period.

== Mint marks ==
Nazi Germany had a number of mints. Each mint location had its own identifiable letter. It is therefore possible to identify exactly which mint produced what coin by noting the mint mark on the coin. Not all mints were authorized to produce coins every year. The mints were also only authorized to produce a set number of coins with some mints allocated a greater production than others. Some of the coins with particular mint marks are therefore scarcer than others. With the silver 2 ℛ︁ℳ︁ and 5 ℛ︁ℳ︁ coins, the mint mark is found under the date on the left side of the coin. On the smaller denomination Reichspfennig coins, the mint mark is found on the bottom center of the coin.

Mint mark	Mint location	Notes	References
A	State Mint Berlin, Germany	Capital of Germany	
B	Austrian Mint Vienna, Austria	Capital of Austria	
D	Bavarian Central Mint Munich, Germany	Capital of Bavaria	
E	Muldenhütten Mint near Dresden, Germany	Capital of Saxony	
F	State Mint Stuttgart, Germany	Capital of Württemberg	
G	State Mint Karlsruhe, Germany	Capital of Baden	
J	Mint of Hamburg, Germany		

== Mintage ==
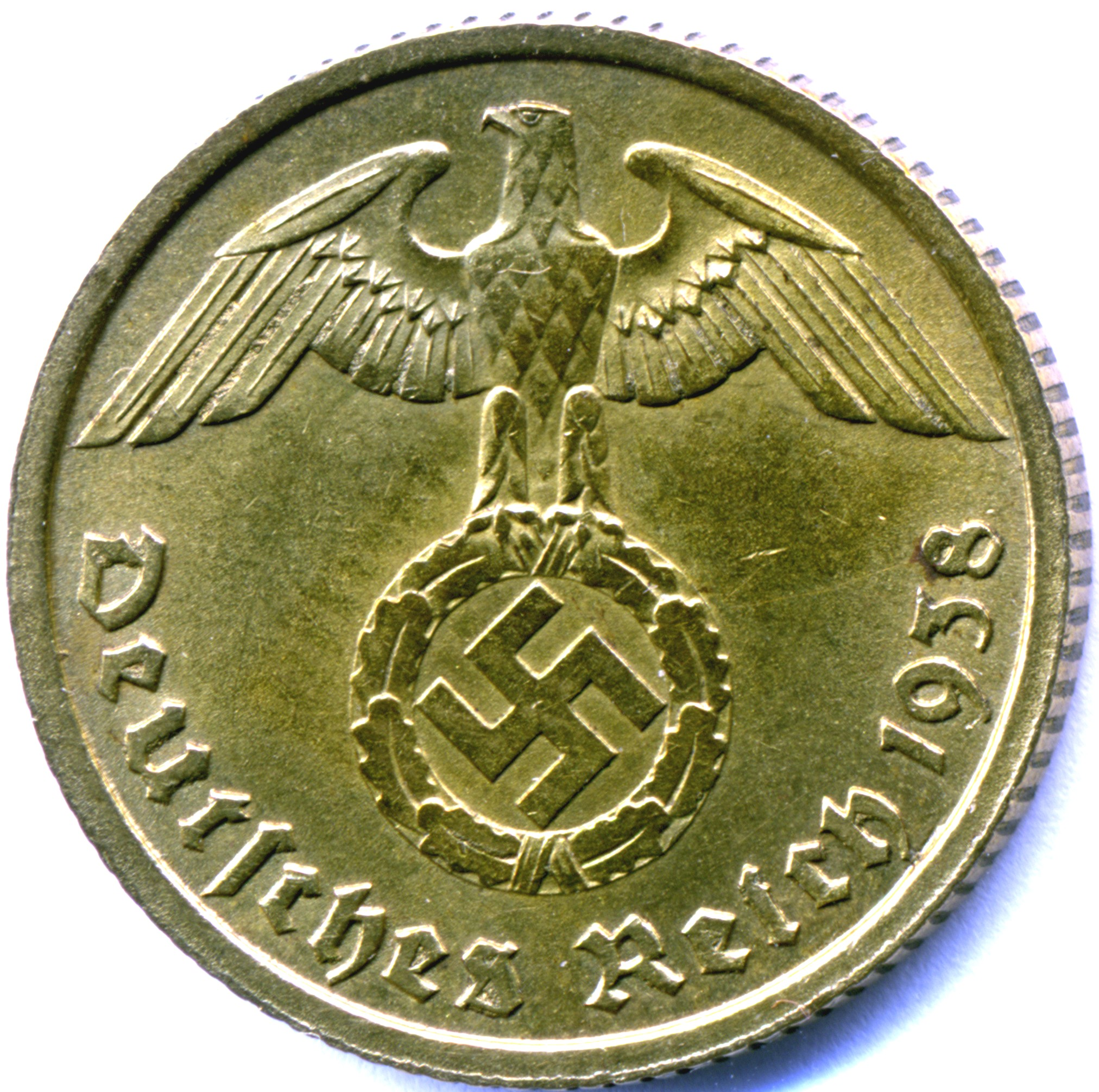
Prewar 10 Reichspfennig (1938A, obverse)

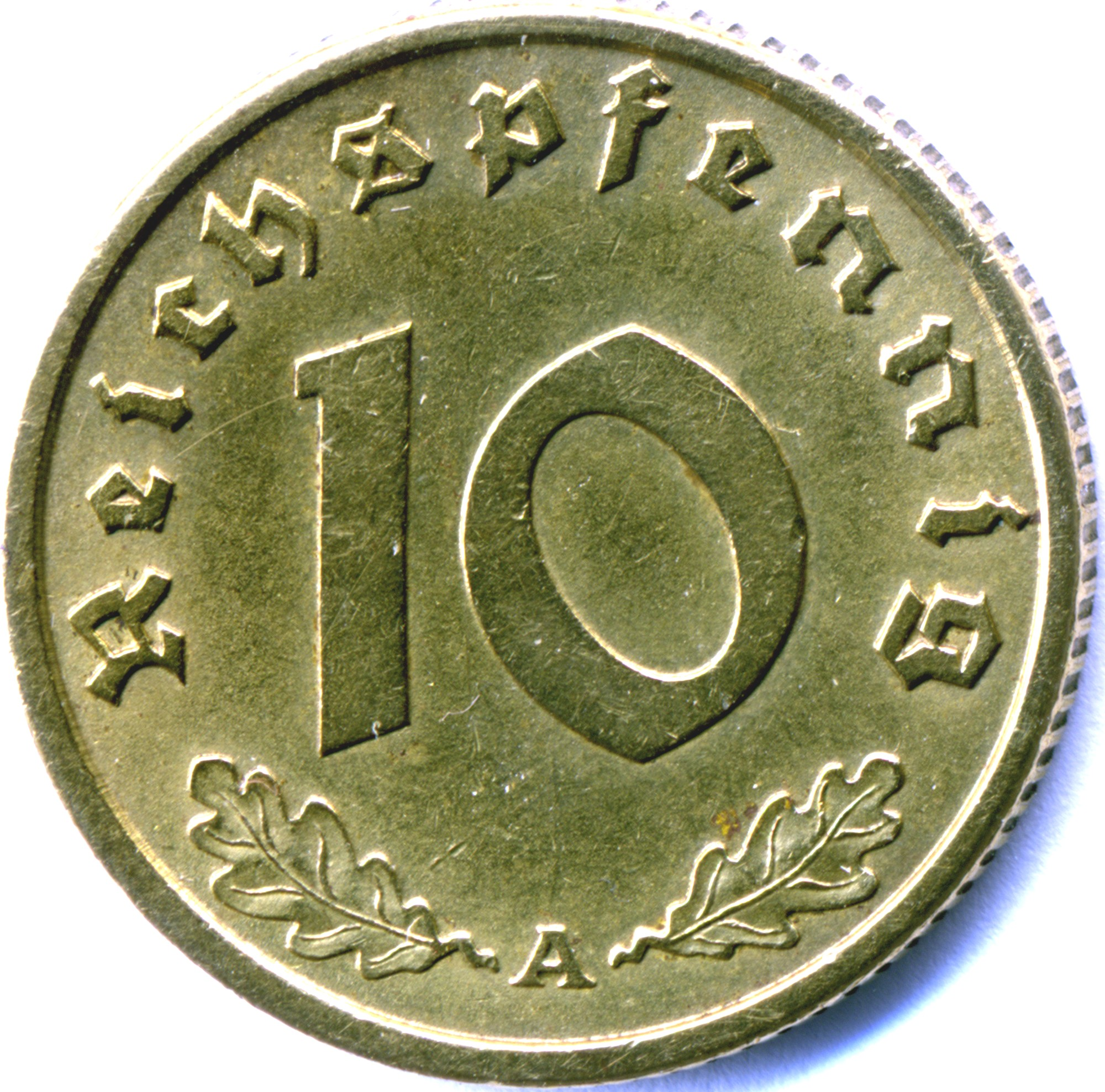
Prewar 10 Reichspfennig (1938A, reverse)

1940
Year	Mintage	Notes
1940 A	212,948,000	
1940 B	76,274,000	
1940 D	45,434,000	
1940 E	34,350,000	
1940 F	27,603,000	
1940 G	27,308,000	
1940 J	41,678,000	

1941
Year	Mintage	Notes
1941 A	240,284,000	
1941 B	70,747,000	
1941 D	77,560,000	
1941 E	36,548,000	
1941 F	42,834,000	
1941 G	28,765,000	
1941 J	30,525,000	

1942
Year	Mintage	Notes
1942 A	184,545,000	
1942 B	16,329,000	
1942 D	40,852,000	
1942 E	18,334,000	
1942 F	32,690,000	
1942 G	20,295,000	
1942 J	29,957,000	

1943
Year	Mintage	Notes
1943 A	157,357,000	
1943 B	11,940,000	
1943 D	17,304,000	
1943 E	10,445,000	
1943 F	24,804,000	
1943 G	3,618,000	Rare
1943 J	1,821,000	Rare

1944
Year	Mintage	Notes
1944 A	84,164,000	
1944 B	40,781,000	
1944 D	30,369,000	
1944 E	29,963,000	
1944 F	19,639,000	
1944 G	13,023,000	

1945
Year	Mintage	Notes
1945 A	7,112,000	Rare
1945 E	4,897,000	Rare

== Banknotes ==
The first Reichsmark banknotes were introduced in 1876 by the Reichsbank and state banks such as those of Bavaria, Saxony and Baden. The first Reichsbank issue of 1924 came in denominations of 10 ℛ︁ℳ︁, 20 ℛ︁ℳ︁, 50 ℛ︁ℳ︁, 100 ℛ︁ℳ︁, and 1,000 ℛ︁ℳ︁. This was followed by a second issue in the same denominations, dated between 1929 and 1936. The second issue commemorated persons who made contributions to German agriculture, industry, economy, science, and architecture: 10 ℛ︁ℳ︁ issued in 1929 commemorated agronomist Albrecht Thaer; 20 ℛ︁ℳ︁ issued in 1929 commemorated engineer, inventor, and industrialist Werner von Siemens; 50 ℛ︁ℳ︁ issued in 1933 commemorated Prussian politician and banker David Hansemann; 100 ℛ︁ℳ︁ issued in 1935 commemorated chemist and "father of fertilizer industry" Justus von Liebig; 1,000 ℛ︁ℳ︁ issued in 1936 commemorated Prussian architect Karl Friedrich Schinkel.

A newer version of 20 ℛ︁ℳ︁ note was introduced in 1939, using a design taken from an unissued Austrian S100 banknote type. 5 ℛ︁ℳ︁ notes were issued in 1942. Throughout this period, the Rentenbank also issued banknotes denominated in Rentenmark, mostly in RM 1 and RM 2 denominations.

In preparation for the occupation of Germany, the United States issued occupation banknotes dated 1944, printed by the Forbes Lithograph Printing Company of Boston. These were printed in similar colours with different sizes for groups of denominations. Notes were issued for 1/2 ℳ︁, 1 ℳ︁, 5 ℳ︁, 10 ℳ︁, 20 ℳ︁, 50 ℳ︁, 100 ℳ︁, and 1,000 ℳ︁. The issuer was the Alliierte Militärbehörde ('Allied military authorities') with In Umlauf gesetzt in Deutschland ('in legal circulation in Germany') printed on the obverse.

These notes were convertible to US dollars at a rate of 10:1. Seeing an opportunity to procure foreign hard currency, the Soviet Union demanded copies of the engraving plates, ink, and associated equipment in early 1944, and on 14 April 1944 Henry Morgenthau and Harry Dexter White of the U.S. Treasury Department authorized the air transfer of these to the USSR. Using a printing plant in occupied Leipzig, the Soviet authorities printed large runs of occupation marks to fill Soviet coffers with dollars causing inflation and financial instability. An investigation by the United States Congress (Occupation Currency Transactions Hearings before the Committee on Appropriations, Armed Services and Banking and Currency, U.S. Senate, 1947) found that about $380,000,000 "more currency than there were appropriations for" had been circulated.

In 1947 Rhineland-Palatinate issued 5₰ and 10₰ notes with Geldschein on them.

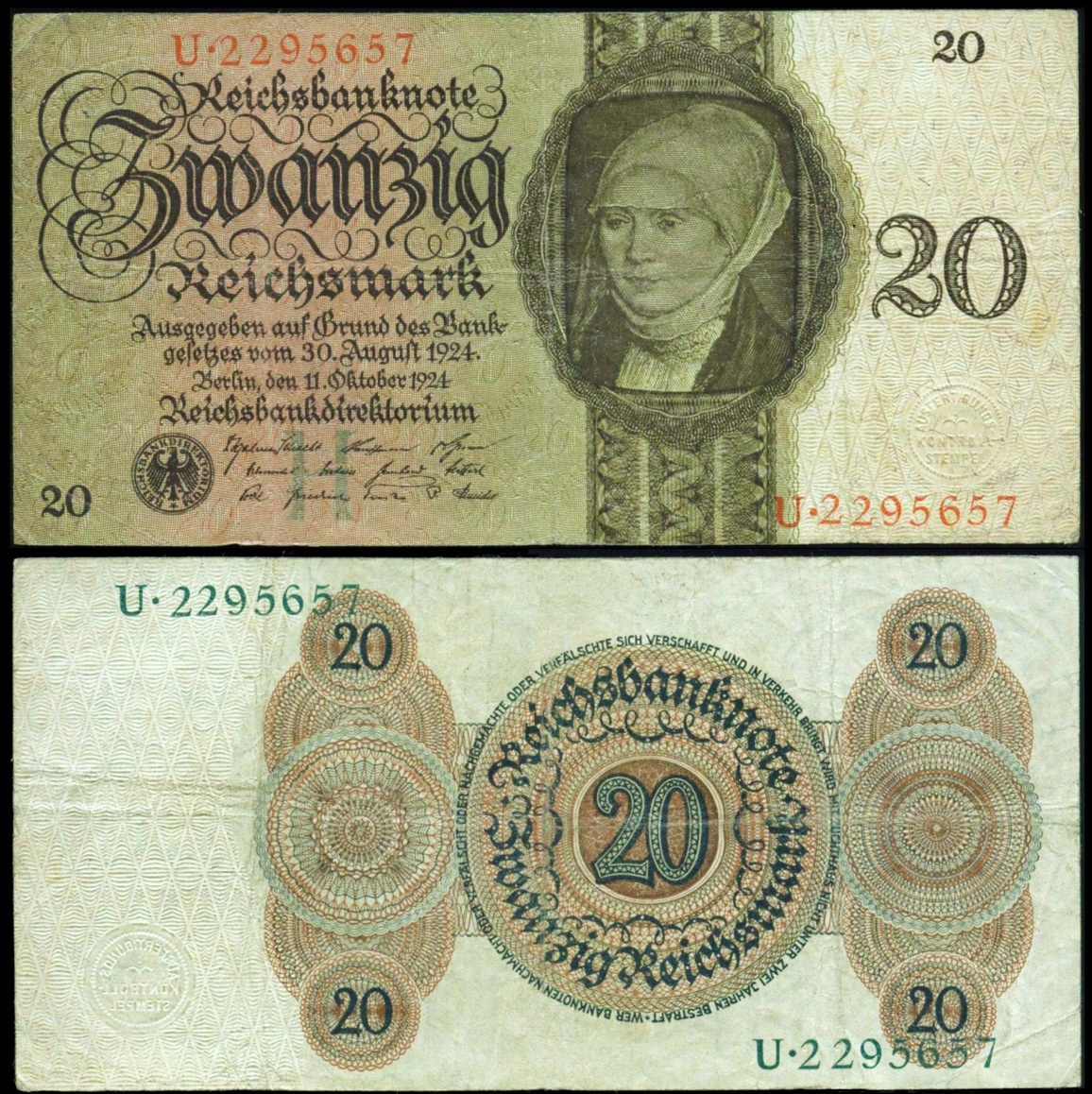
20 ℛ︁ℳ︁, 1924

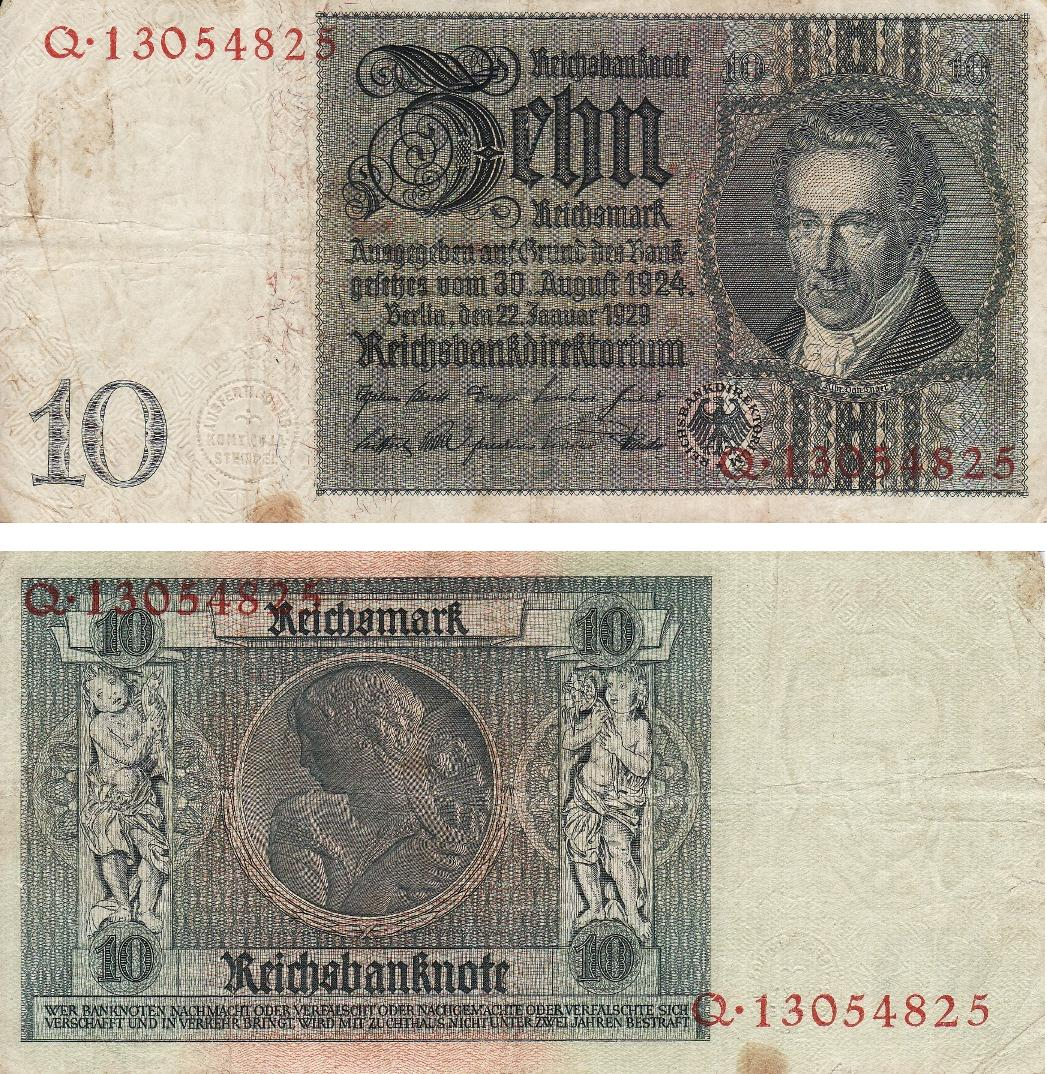
10 ℛ︁ℳ︁, 1929

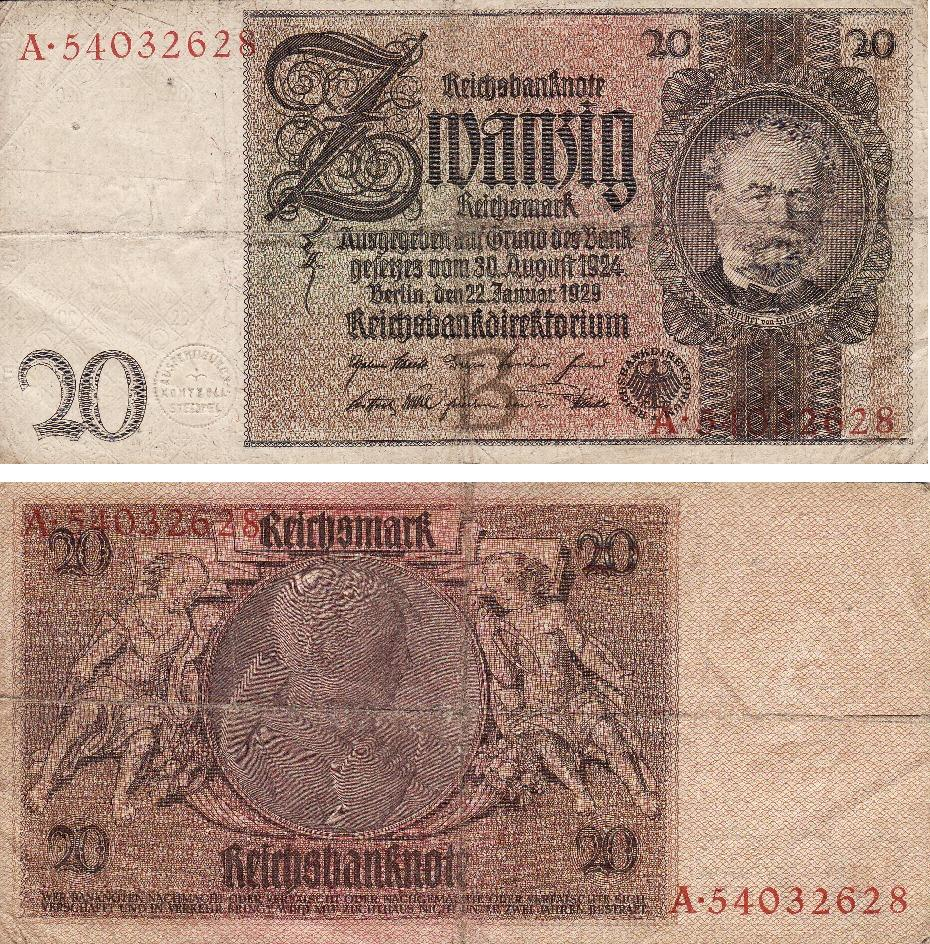
20 ℛ︁ℳ︁, 1929

== Occupation Reichsmark ==
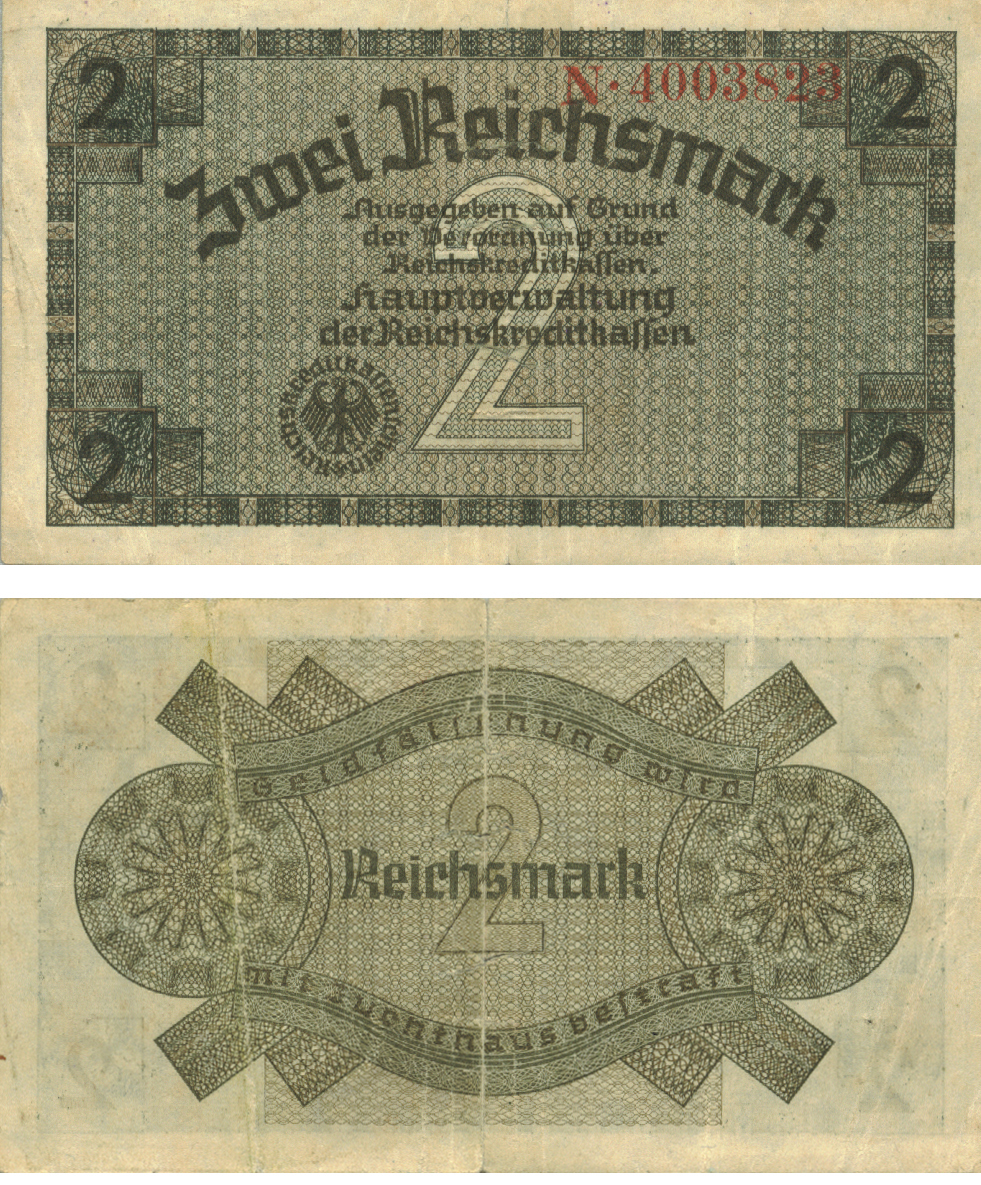
2 Reichsmark of the occupied territories

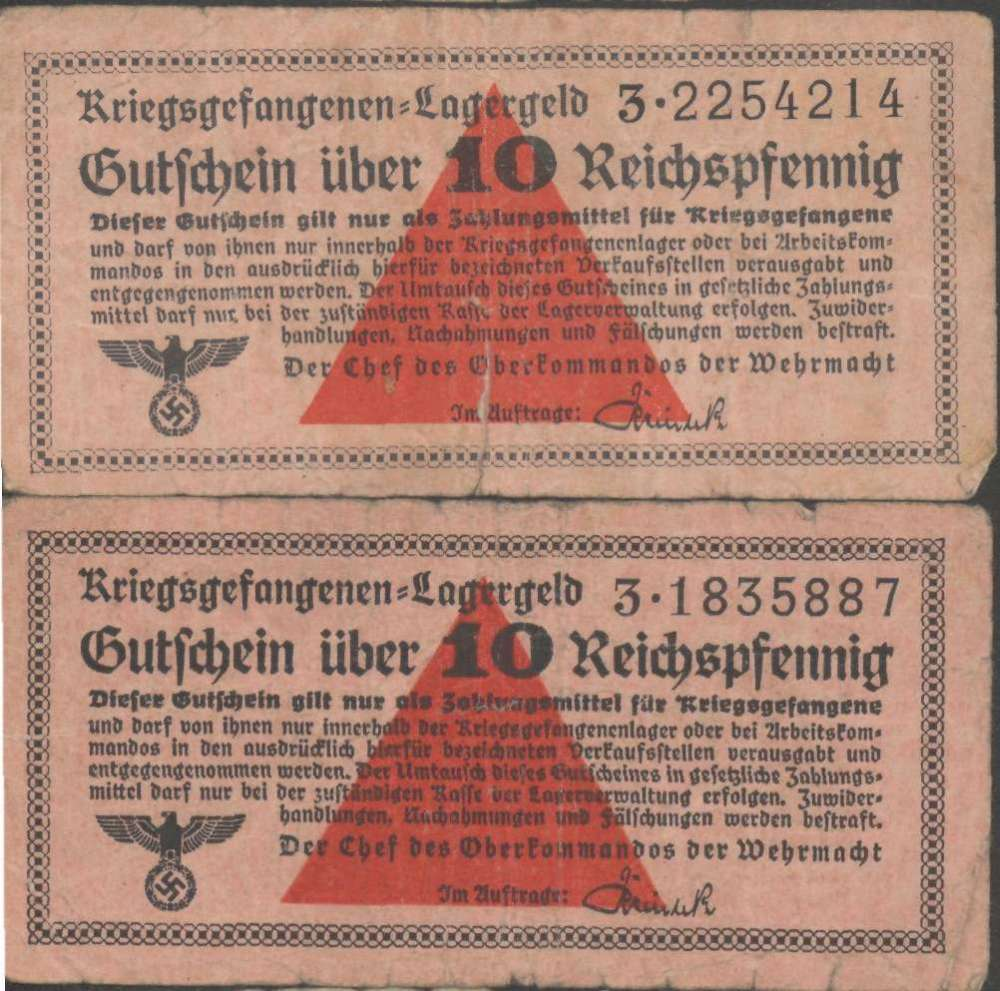
Prisoner of war camp issue of Lagergeld

Coins and banknotes for circulation in the occupied territories during the war were issued by the Reichskreditkassen. Holed, zinc coins in 5 ℛ︁₰ and 10 ℛ︁₰ denominations were struck in 1940 and 1941. Banknotes were issued between 1939 and 1945 in denominations of 50 ℛ︁₰, 1 ℛ︁ℳ︁, 2 ℛ︁ℳ︁, 5 ℛ︁ℳ︁, 20 ℛ︁ℳ︁, and 50 ℛ︁ℳ︁. These served as legal tender alongside the currency of the occupied countries.

The coins were originally planned in great numbers of 100 million and 250 million each of the 5 ℛ︁₰ and 10 ℛ︁₰ coins respectively. The first embossing order, which was issued in April 1940, was about 40 million × 5 ℛ︁₰ and 100 million × 10 ℛ︁₰. The total amount was divided between each of the seven German mints after the embossing key of 1939. The contract was stopped in August 1940 as the Wehrmacht, which had requested the coins for Belgium and France, had no more need of it. When the embossing stopped, only Berlin ("A") and Munich ("D") produced significant quantities, but they still came to only a small extent of original production plans. The majority were melted down due to the limited supply of metal and thus, most mint marks are now quite rare (except for 1940 5 A and D, and 1940 10 A).

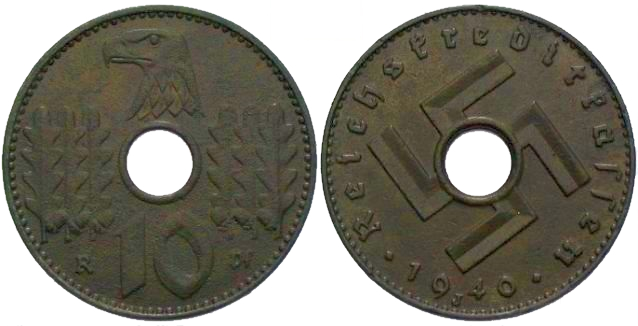
Currency of the occupied countries (1940 10 J)

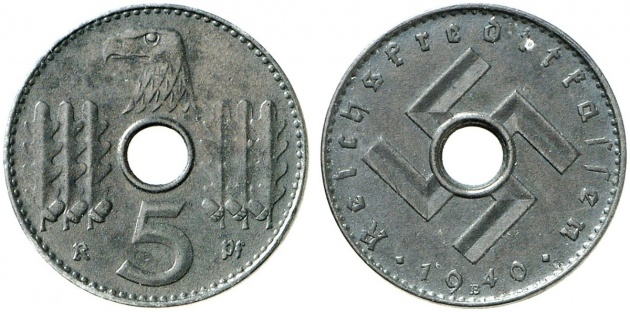
Currency of the occupied countries (1940 5 B)

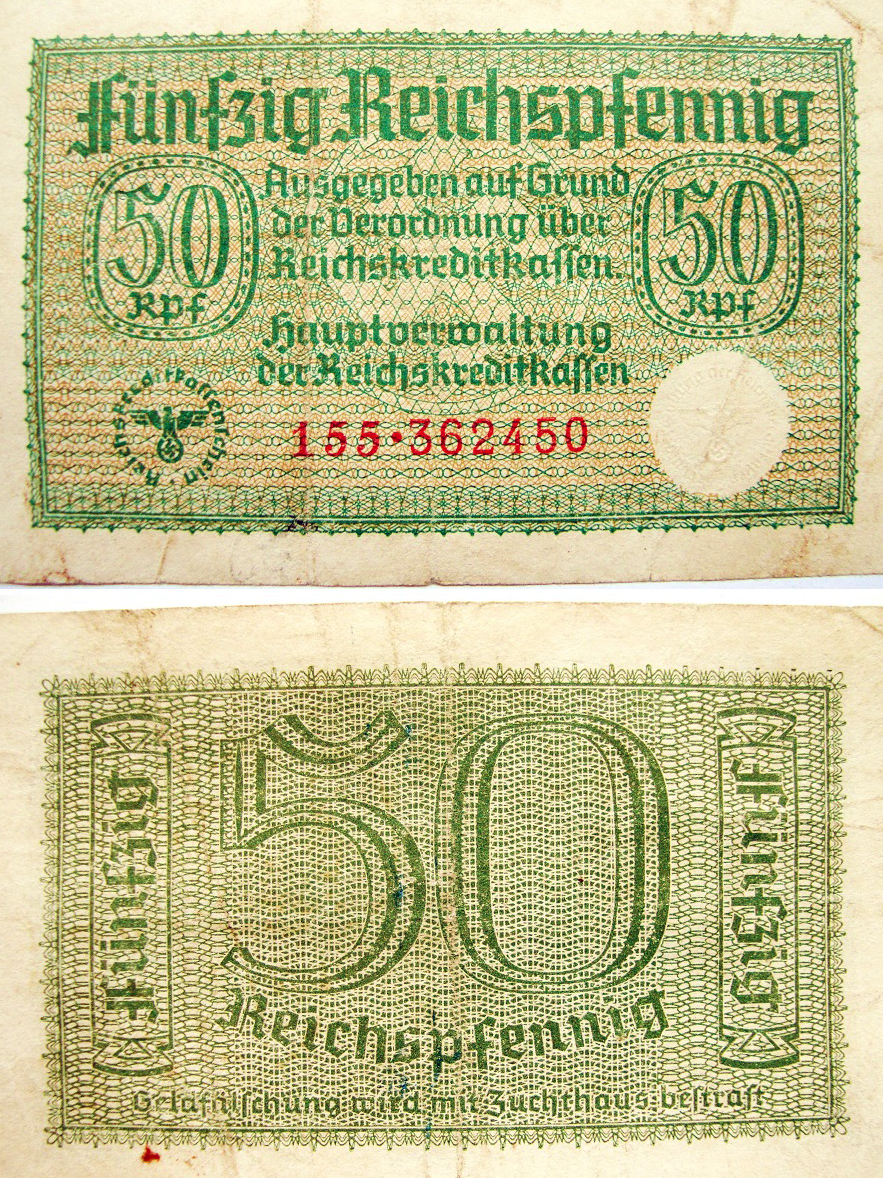
50 ℛ︁₰, 1938–1945

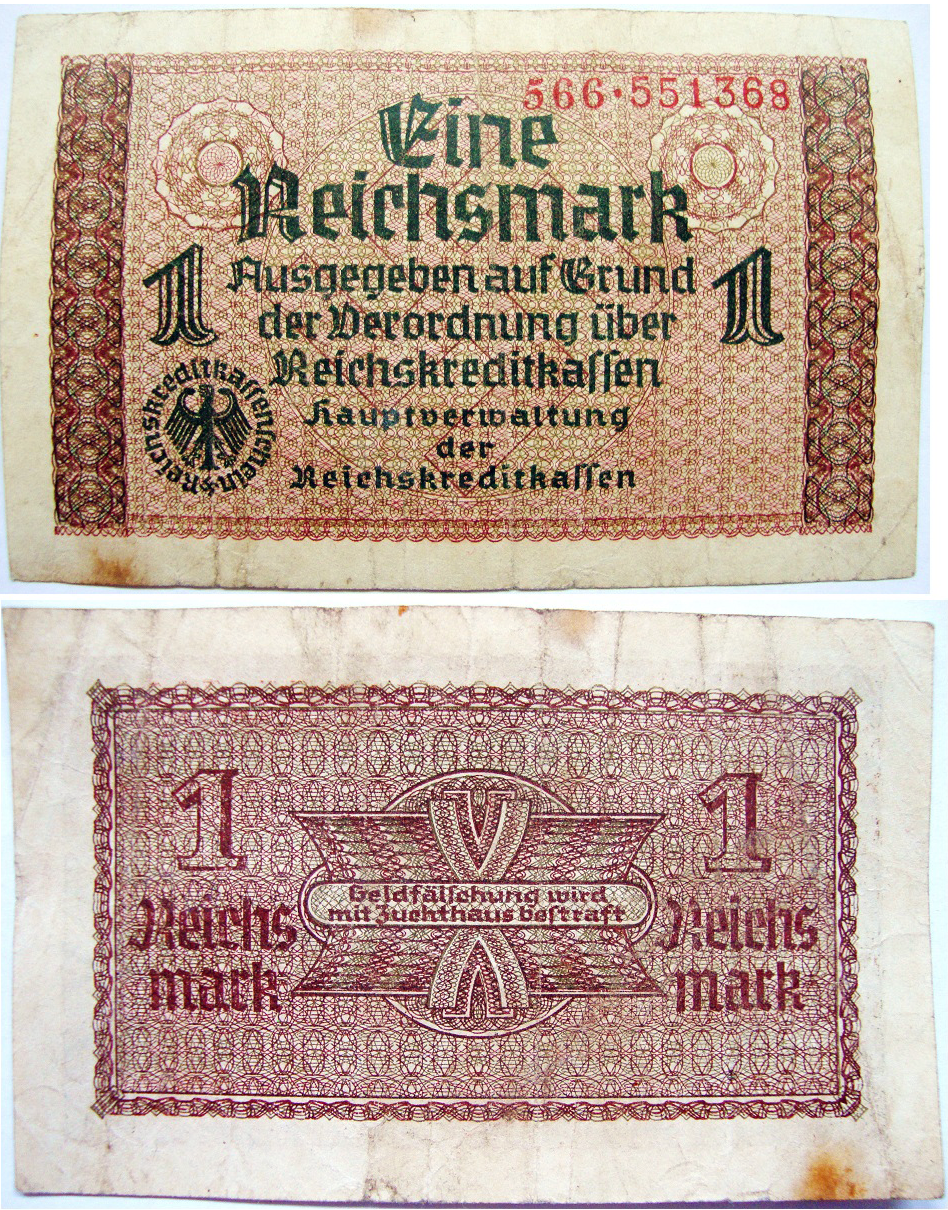
1 ℛ︁ℳ︁, 1938–1945

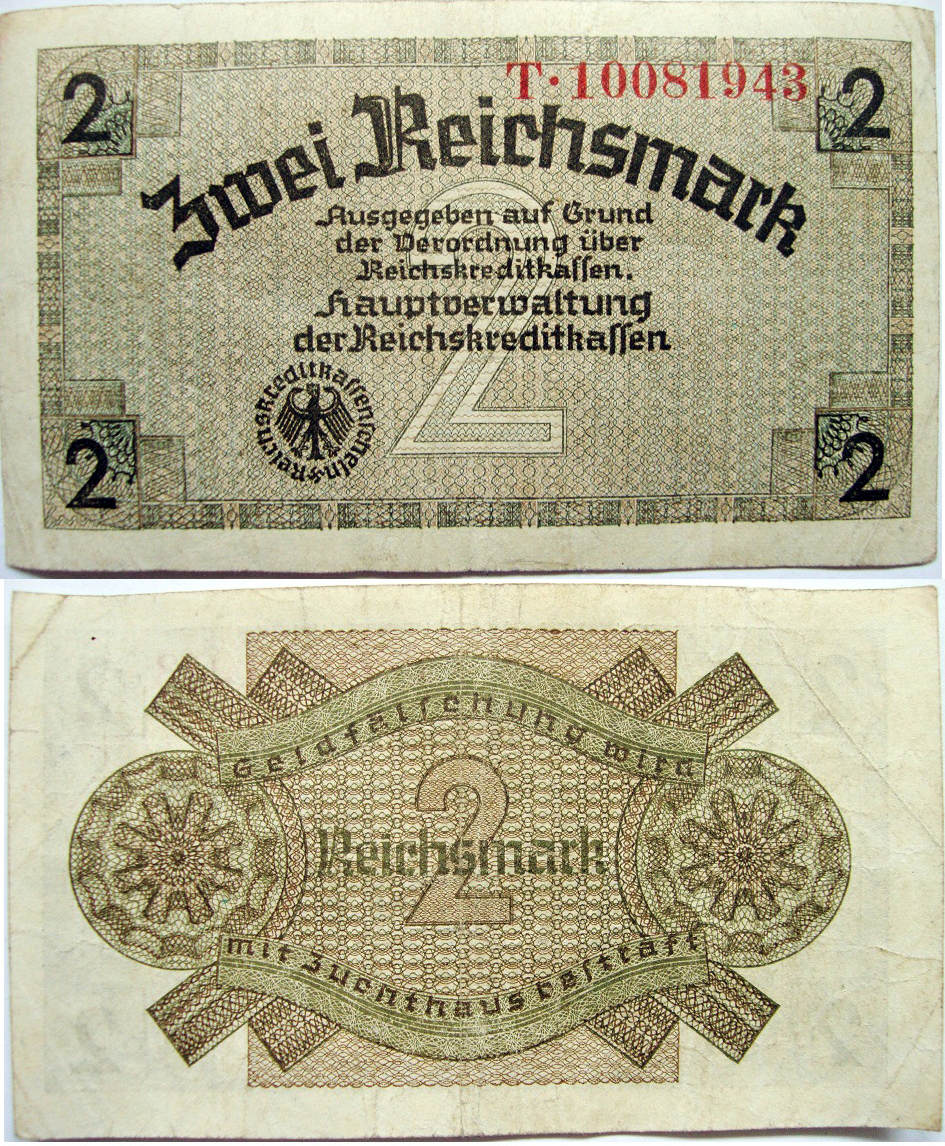
2 ℛ︁ℳ︁, 1938–1945

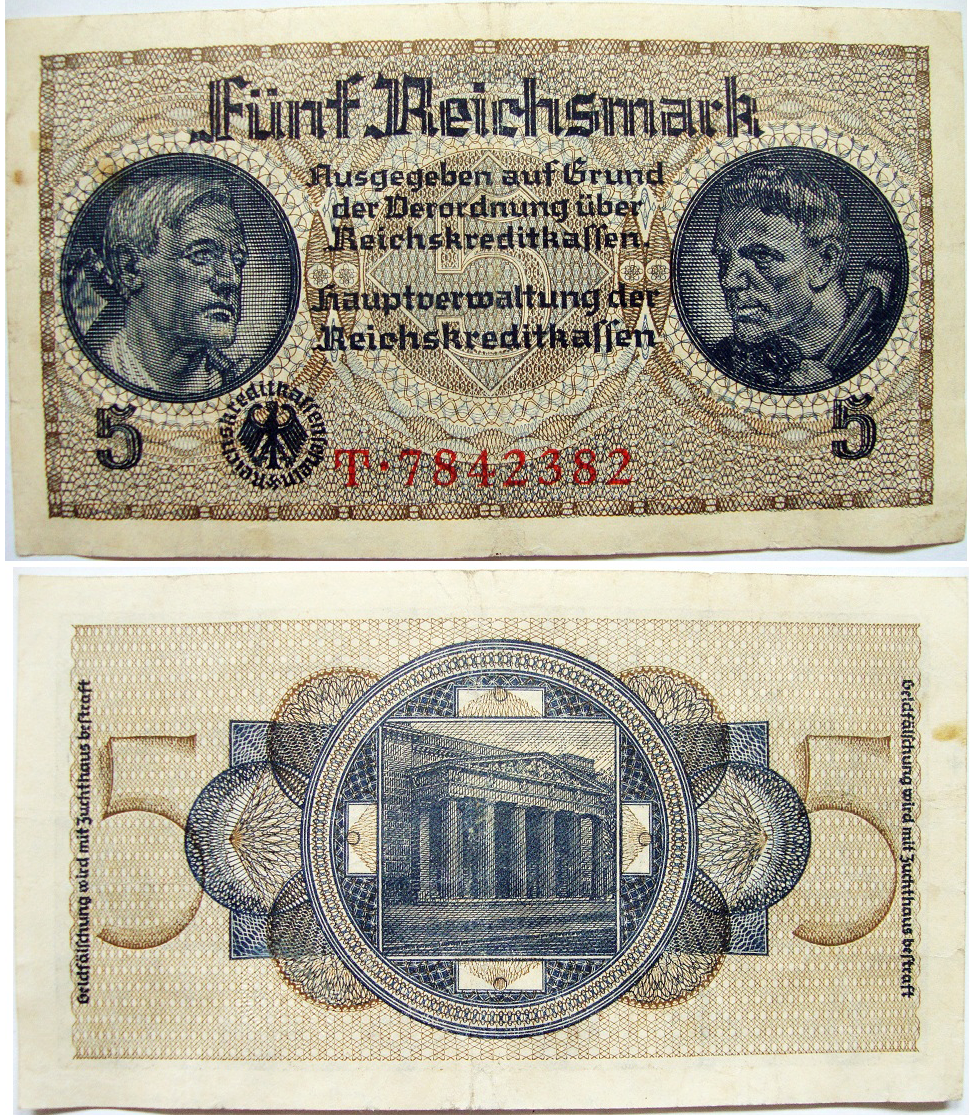
5 ℛ︁ℳ︁, 1938–1945

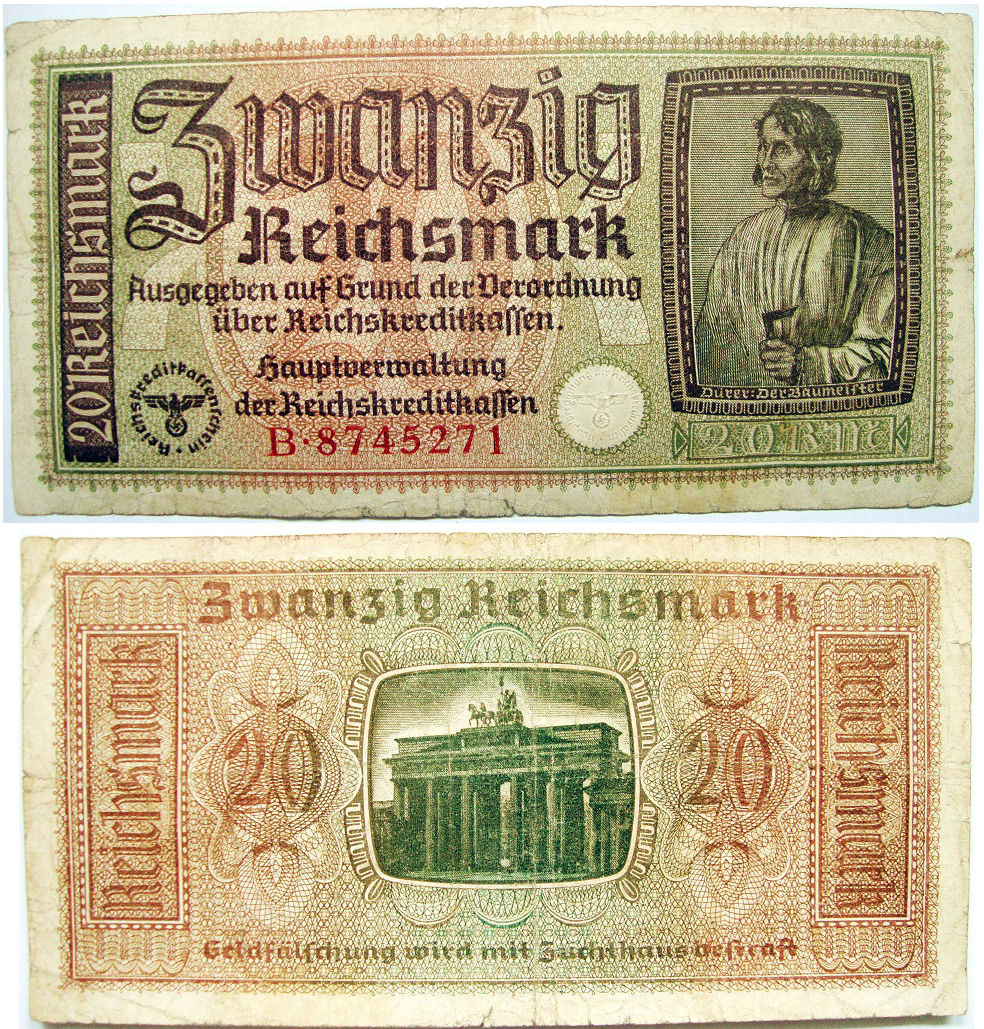
20 ℛ︁ℳ︁, 1938–1945

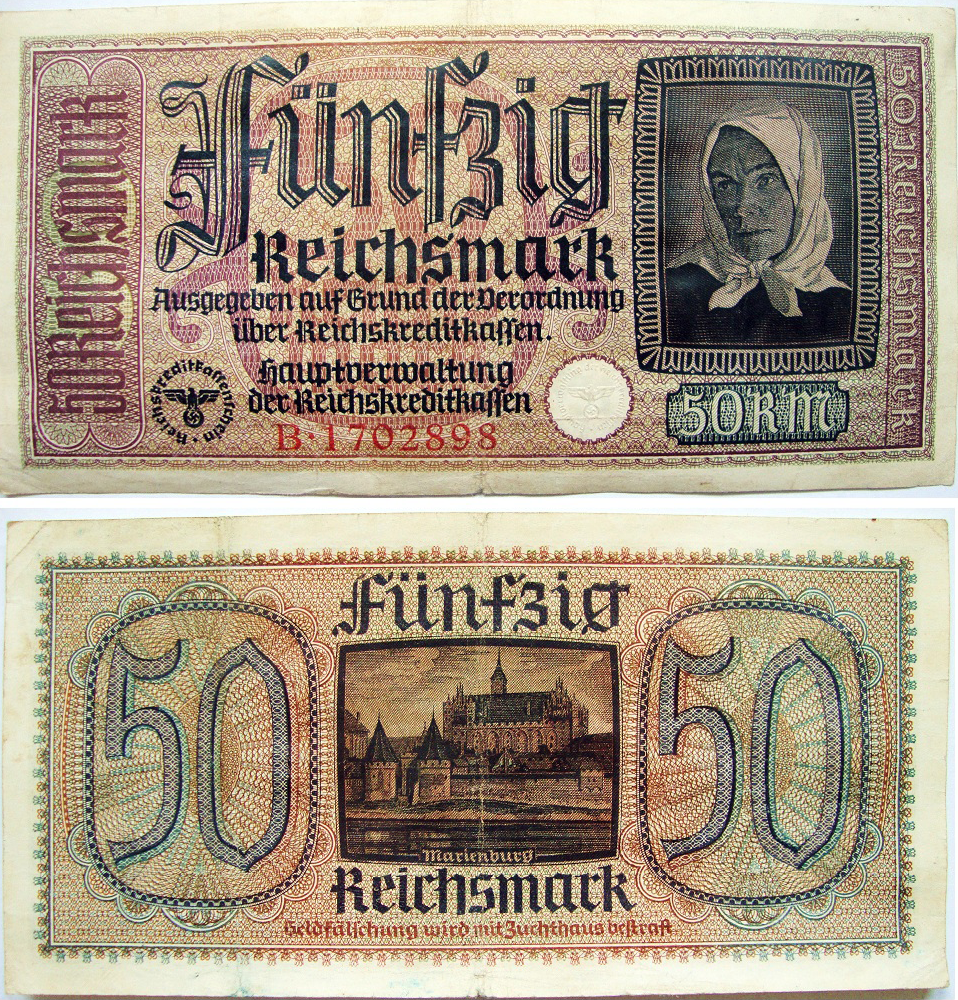
50 ℛ︁ℳ︁, 1938–1945

== Concentration camp and POW Reichsmark currency ==
Various special issues of Reichsmark currency were issued for use in concentration and prisoner of war (POW) camps (Stalag). None were legal tender in Germany itself. From 1942 to 1943 tokens were struck for use within the Łódź Ghetto.

== Military Reichsmark currency ==
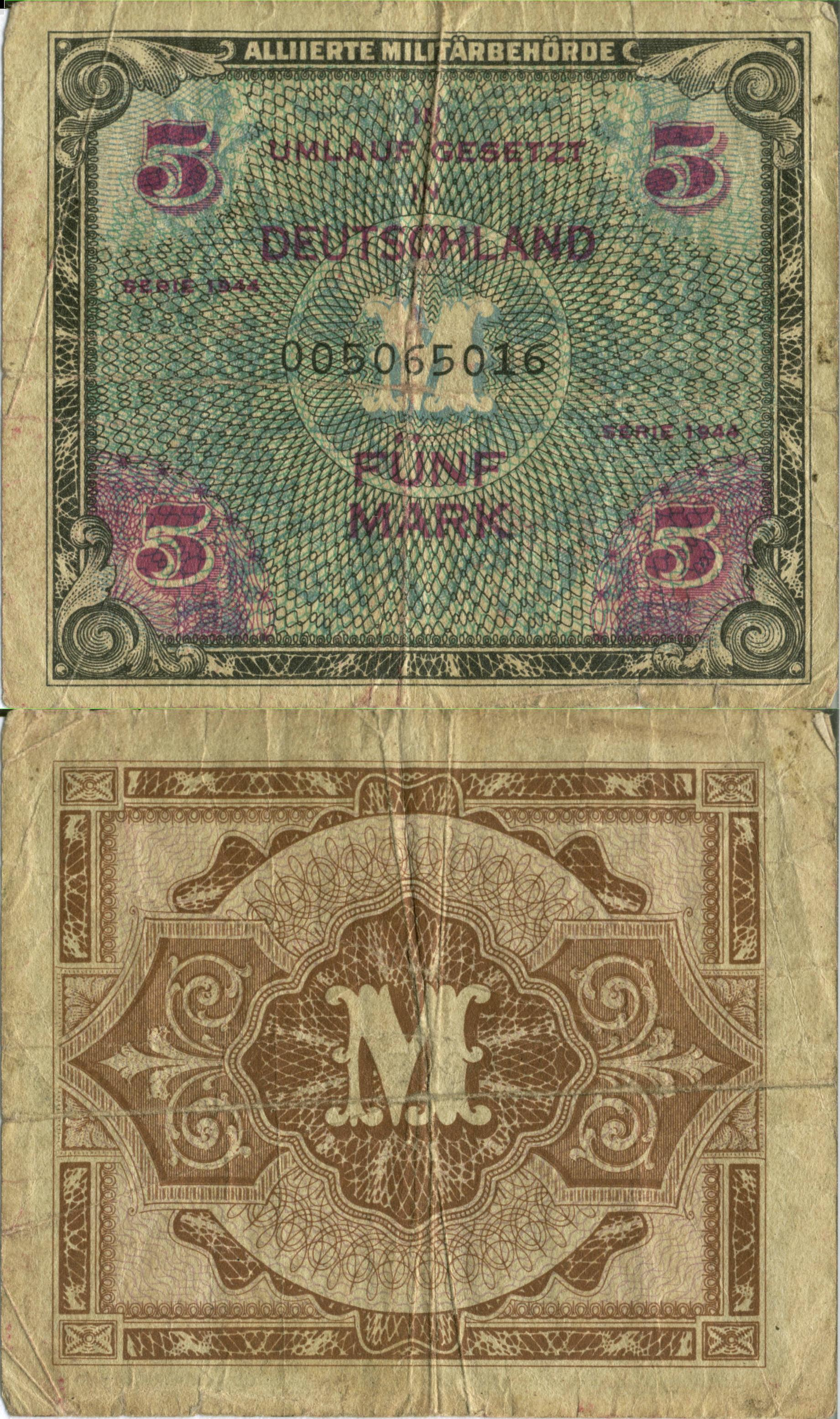
Both sides of a "5 Mark" banknote, issued as "Allied Military Currency" for use within the Allied forces in Germany

Special issues of Reichsmark currency were issued for use by the Wehrmacht from 1942 to 1944. The first issue was denominated in 1 ℛ︁₰, 5 ℛ︁₰, 10 ℛ︁₰, and 50 ℛ︁₰ and 1 ℛ︁ℳ︁, but was valued at 1 military Reichspfennig = 10 civilian Reichspfennig. This series was printed on only one side. The second issue notes of 1 ℛ︁ℳ︁, 5 ℛ︁ℳ︁, 10 ℛ︁ℳ︁, and 50 ℛ︁ℳ︁ were equal in value to the ordinary German Reichsmark and were printed on both sides.

The 5 Mark note pictured, front and back, is Allied military currency ("AMC") printed at Forbes Lithograph Manufacturing Company in Boston for occupied Germany. There were different AMCs for each liberated area of Europe.

== See also ==
- AM-Mark
- MEFO Financial instrument used to finance Nazi German rearmament
- Öffa bills 1932 German government promissory notes
- Pictorial list of postage stamps in Nazi Germany

Preceded by: Rentenmark; Reason: hyperinflation Ratio: 1 Rentenmark = 1,000,000,000,000 Papiermark, and 4.2 Rentenmark = US$1	Currency of Germany (Weimar Republic borders); 1924 – 1948; Note: In parallel with Rentenmark	Succeeded by: East German Mark; Reason: reaction to the changeover in Trizone (later West Germany and West Berlin); Ratio: 1 Mark = 7 Rentenmark on the first 70 Rentenmark for private individuals, otherwise 1 Kuponmark = 10 Rentenmark
Preceded by: Rentenmark; Reason: hyperinflation Ratio: 1 Rentenmark = 1,000,000,000,000 Papiermark, and 4.2 Rentenmark = US$1	Currency of Germany (Weimar Republic borders); 1924 – 1948; Note: In parallel with Rentenmark	Succeeded by: Deutsche Mark; Reason: intended to protect West Germany from the second wave of hyperinflation and stop the rampant barter and black market trade Ratio: 1 Deutsche Mark = 1 Rentenmark for first 600 ℛ︁ℳ︁, 1 Deutsche Mark = 10 Rentenmark thereafter, plus each person received 40 Deutsche Mark
Preceded by: Rentenmark; Reason: hyperinflation Ratio: 1 Rentenmark = 1,000,000,000,000 Papiermark, and 4.2 Rentenmark = US$1	Currency of Germany (Weimar Republic borders); 1924 – 1948; Note: In parallel with Rentenmark	Succeeded by: Polish złoty Reason: Transfer of the Recovered Territories to Poland; Ratio: None
Preceded by: Rentenmark; Reason: hyperinflation Ratio: 1 Rentenmark = 1,000,000,000,000 Papiermark, and 4.2 Rentenmark = US$1	Currency of Germany (Weimar Republic borders); 1924 – 1948; Note: In parallel with Rentenmark	Succeeded by: Soviet ruble Reason: Transfer of modern Kaliningrad Oblast to Soviet Union; Ratio: None
Preceded by: French franc Reason: annexation to Germany; Ratio: ?	Currency of Saarland; 1935 – 1947; Note: In parallel with Rentenmark	Succeeded by: Saar mark Reason: creation of the protectorate Ratio: ?
Preceded by: Austrian schilling Reason: annexation to Germany; Ratio: 1 Mark = 1.5 Schilling	Currency of Austria; 1938 – 1945; Note: In parallel with Rentenmark	Succeeded by: Austrian schilling Reason: restoration of independence Ratio: 1:1 for first 150 Schilling
Preceded by: Czechoslovak koruna Reason: annexation to Germany; Ratio: ?	Currency of Sudetenland; 1938 – 1945; Note: In parallel with Rentenmark	Succeeded by: Czechoslovak koruna Reason: re-integration to Czechoslovakia; Ratio: ?
Preceded by: Lithuanian litas Reason: annexation to Germany; Ratio: 1 Mark = 2.5 litas	Currency of Klaipėda (Memel); 1939 – 1945; Note: In parallel with Rentenmark	Succeeded by: Soviet ruble Reason: re-integration to Soviet Union; Ratio: ?
Preceded by: Danzig gulden Reason: annexation to Germany; Ratio: 1 Mark = 1.43 Gulden	Currency of the Free City of Danzig; 1939 – 1945; Note: In parallel with Rentenmark	Succeeded by: Polish złoty Reason: annexation to Poland; Ratio: ?
Preceded by: Polish złoty Reason: annexation to Germany; Ratio: 1 Mark = 2 złote	Currency of Polish areas annexed by Nazi Germany; 1939 – 1945	Succeeded by: Polish złoty Reason: re-integration to Poland; Ratio: ?
Preceded by: Belgian franc Reason: annexation to Germany; Ratio: 1 Mark = 12.5 franc	Currency of Eupen-Malmedy; 1940 – 1945; Note: In parallel with Rentenmark	Succeeded by: Belgian franc Reason: re-integration to Belgium; Ratio: 1 Mark = 12.5 franc
Preceded by: Luxembourgish franc Reason: annexation to Germany; Ratio: 1 Mark = 10 Franc	Currency of Luxembourg; 1940 – 1945; Note: In parallel with Rentenmark	Succeeded by: Belgian franc Luxembourgish franc Reason: restoration of independence Ratio: ?
Preceded by: French franc Reason: annexation to Germany; Ratio: ?	Currency of Alsace-Lorraine; 1940 – 1945; Note: In parallel with Rentenmark	Succeeded by: French franc Reason: re-integration to France; Ratio: ?
Preceded by: Yugoslav dinar Reason: annexation to Germany; Ratio: 1 Mark = 20 dinars	Currency of northern Slovenia; 1941 – 1945; Note: In parallel with Rentenmark	Succeeded by: Yugoslav dinar Reason: re-integration to Yugoslavia; Ratio: ?
Preceded by: Italian lira Reason: annexation to Germany; Ratio: ?	Currency of southern Slovenia; 1943 – 1945; Note: In parallel with Rentenmark	Succeeded by: Yugoslav dinar Reason: re-integration to Yugoslavia; Ratio: ?
Preceded by: Soviet ruble Reason: annexation to Romania; Ratio: ?	Currency of Transnistria; 1941 – 1945	Succeeded by: Soviet ruble Reason: re-integration to Soviet Union; Ratio: ?
