= Saar franc =

Currency of the Saar Protectorate from 1948 to 1956

Saar-Franken (German)
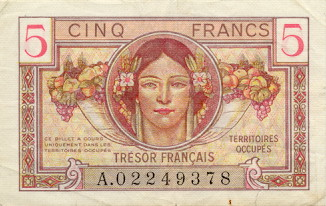
5 Saar francs (franken), issued by the French Treasury (Trésor Français) for use in the Saar Protectorate (1947)
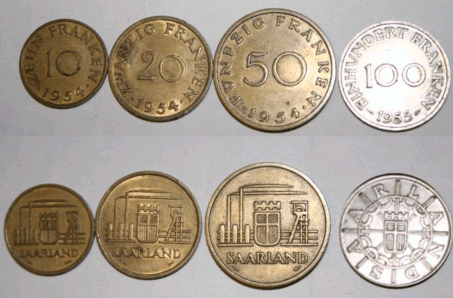
Coins of the Saar franc (franken)

Denominations
- Subunit
- 1/100: Centime
- Coins: 10, 20, 50, 100 francs

Demographics
- Date of introduction: 1947
- Replaced: Reichsmark; Saar mark
- Date of withdrawal: 6 July 1959
- Replaced by: Deutsche Mark
- User(s): Saar Protectorate

Issuance
- Central bank: Saar Protectorate
- Mint: Monnaie de Paris
- Website: www.monnaiedeparis.com
- This infobox shows the latest status before this currency was rendered obsolete.

The Saar franc was the French franc (German: Franken) used as the official currency of the Saar during the times that the Saar territory was economically split off from Germany, in 1920–1935 as the Territory of the Saar Basin, in 1947–1957 as the Saar Protectorate and 1957–1959 as the state of Saarland in West Germany. Local notes and coins were issued during both periods, but the Saar franc was never legally an independent currency.

== History ==
=== 1920–1935 ===
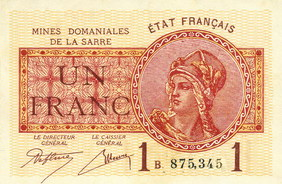
1-franc note of the Saar coal mine administration, 1920s

The Treaty of Versailles stated in Article 45 that the newly formed territory would be administered by the League of Nations for 15 years, and France was then granted the complete benefit of the Saar coal mines. The new French administration of the coal mines was granted the right to process all financial transactions with French francs. Therefore, from 1921 to 1923, the French franc was used alongside the German mark (ℳ), and from 1923 on, when the Saar Territory was incorporated officially into the French economy, the franc became the only valid currency. Due to the shortage of nonferrous metal, the coal mines administration began to print its own banknotes, the so-called "Grubengeld" ("coal mine money"). After 1930, these notes were replaced by the usual French notes.

After the plebiscite of 1935, when the Saar Territory was unified with the German Empire again, the Reichsmark (ℛℳ) was immediately introduced. The official exchange rate was 1 franc = 0.1645 ℛℳ.

=== 1947–1959 ===
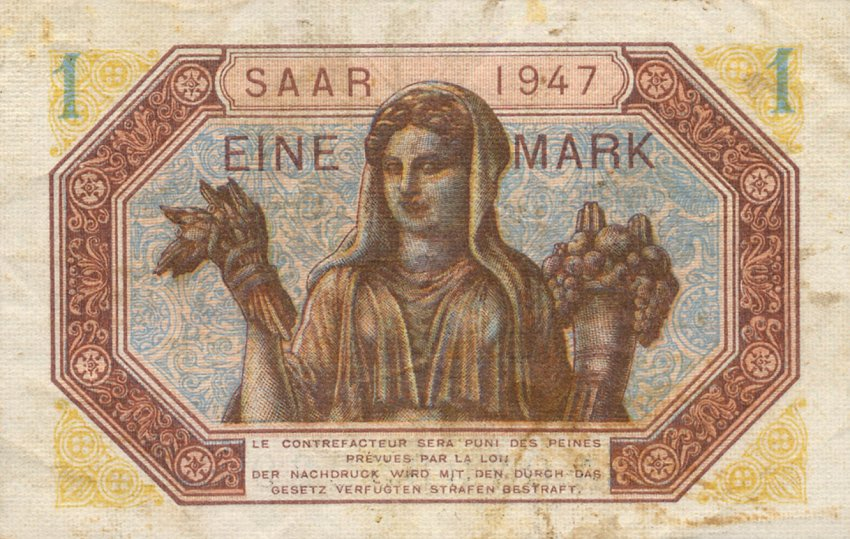
SaarP3-1Mark-1947 b

On 16 July 1947, banknotes were issued for Saar denominated in marks, which replaced the German Reichsmark. But in November 1947, the French government reintroduced the French franc as the official currency. Between 20 November 1947 and 15 January 1948, all notes and coins had to be exchanged at a rate of 20 Saar marks = 1 franc. In 1954 the government of the Protectorate issued new coins in denominations of 10, 20, 50 and 100 francs. The coins resembled the coins of the French franc (same metallic composition, size and weight) and were officially and legally not a currency of their own, but only local issues of the French franc.

After a referendum about the future status of the region, Saarland was incorporated into the Federal Republic of Germany as a Bundesland on 1 January 1957. The economic integration into Germany was completed with the withdrawal of all Saar francs two years later. On 29 June 1959 the federal ordinance "Verordnung zur Einführung der Deutschen Mark im Saarland" stipulated that – with effect from 6 July (§ 1) – all debts, credits, deposits, wages, rents, fees, interest servicing, or amortisation payments, and other obligations, as well as cash reserves and prices denominated in francs were to be converted at the rate of 100 francs = 0.8507 Deutsche Mark (§ 2). The conversion had been brought forward by half a year because of the accelerating depreciation of the French franc. The date was kept secret (called "day X") to avoid currency speculation until two days in advance. The freedom to fix new prices was maintained, but especially temporarily or permanently-fixed obligations, not to be altered at any time, were to be not renegotiated but converted at the rate fixed.

== Appearance and acceptance ==
Pictures on coins of Saar Protectorate always depicted things related to industry and mining in the region. Moreover, the coat of arms of the Saar Protectorate appears on every coin.

Coins of 10, 20 and 50 francs depicted a factory and mining tower, with the coat of arms of the Saar Protectorate in front of them. 100-franc coins depicted a gearwheel, again with the coat of arms of Saar Protectorate in front of it.

All four coins were identical to the official French coins in color, size and weight and only the writing and the picture was different. There were no smaller coins, as the usual French coins (1, 2, 5 francs) were used instead. All French coins were accepted in the protectorate, but the Saar coins were usually not accepted in France except in the bigger cities adjacent to the border.

Coins of the Saar franc
Image	Value	Technical parameters				Description			Date of minting
Image	Value	Diameter	Thickness	Mass	Composition	Edge	Obverse	Reverse	Date of minting
	10 francs	20 mm	1.5 mm	3.00 grams	Aluminium-bronze	Plain/Smooth	Industrial scene with the coat of arms of the Saar Protectorate, text "SAARLAND"	10, text "ZEHN FRANKEN", date	1954
	20 francs	23.8 mm	1.65 mm	4.00 grams	Aluminium-bronze	Plain/Smooth	Industrial scene with the coat of arms of the Saar Protectorate, text "SAARLAND"	20, text "ZWANZIG FRANKEN", date	1954
	50 francs	27 mm	2.4 mm	8.00 grams	Aluminium-bronze	Plain/Smooth	Industrial scene with the coat of arms the Saar Protectorate, text "SAARLAND"	50, text "FÜNFZIG FRANKEN", date	1954
	100 francs	24 mm	1.88 mm	6.00 grams	Copper-nickel	Reeded	Coat of arms of the Saar Protectorate within a circular design, text "SAARLAND"	100, text "EINHUNDERT FRANKEN", date	1955

Saar franc
Preceded by: Reichsmark and Saar mark Reason: Introduction of a circulating currency of the Saar. Ratio: 20 Saar mark = 1 French franc	Currency of Saar; 20 November 1947 – 15 January 1948	Succeeded by: Saar franc Reason: Introduction of a local version of the French franc.

Saar franc
Preceded by: Saar franc Reason: Introduction of a local version of the French franc. Ratio: 20 Saar mark = 1 French franc	Currency of Saar; 1954 – 29 June 1959	Succeeded by: Deutsche Mark; Reason: Incorporation of Saarland into the Federal Republic of Germany as a Bundesland on 1 January 1957, and subsequent withdrawal of the Saar franc on 6 July 1959. Ratio: 100 francs = 0.8507 Deutsche Mark
