= Saar mark =

Currency of the Saar Protectorate in 1947

Saar Mark
Saar-Mark (German); Mark sarrois (French)
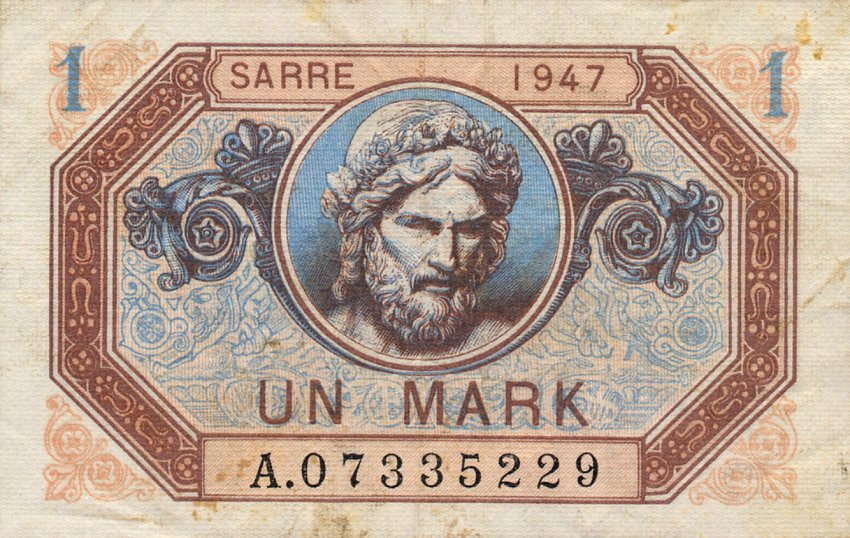
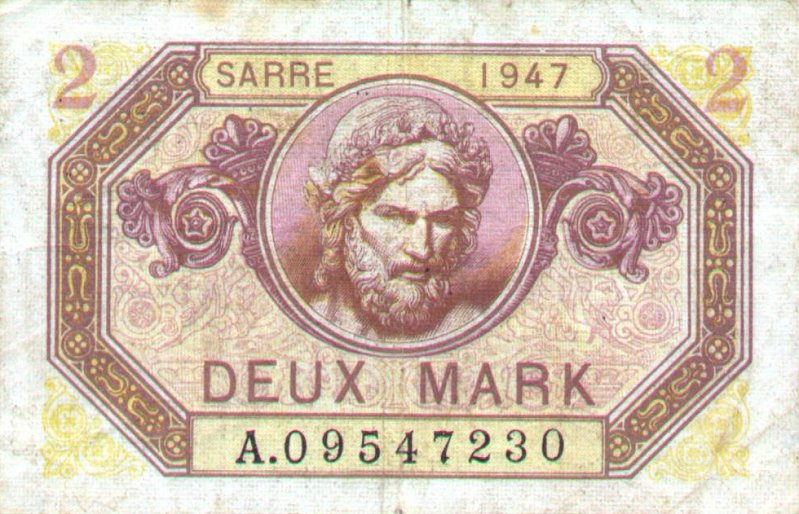
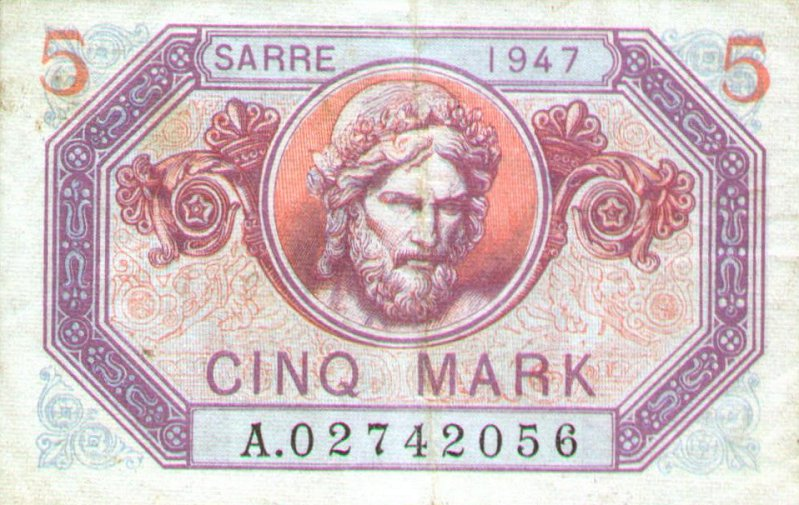
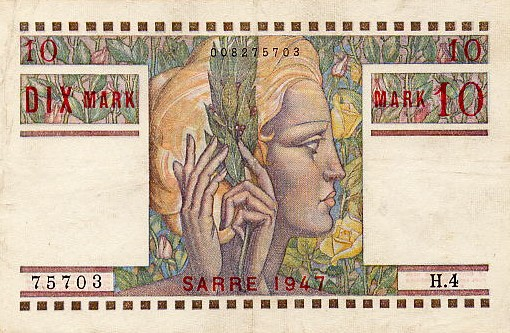
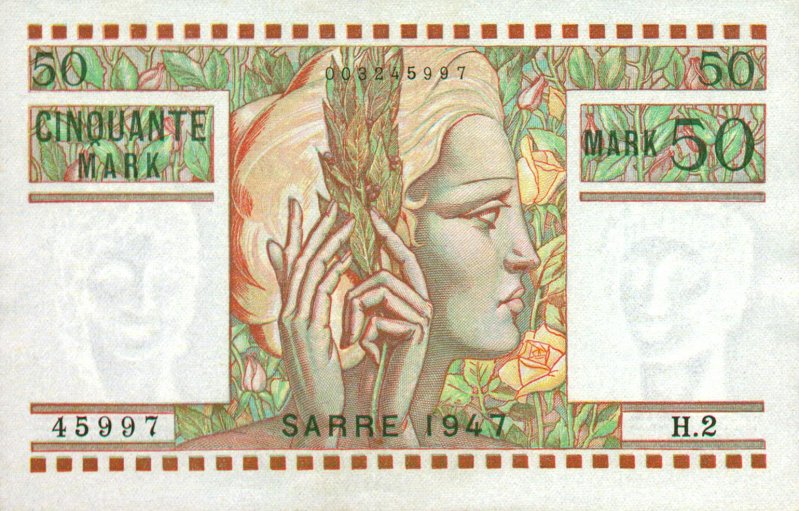
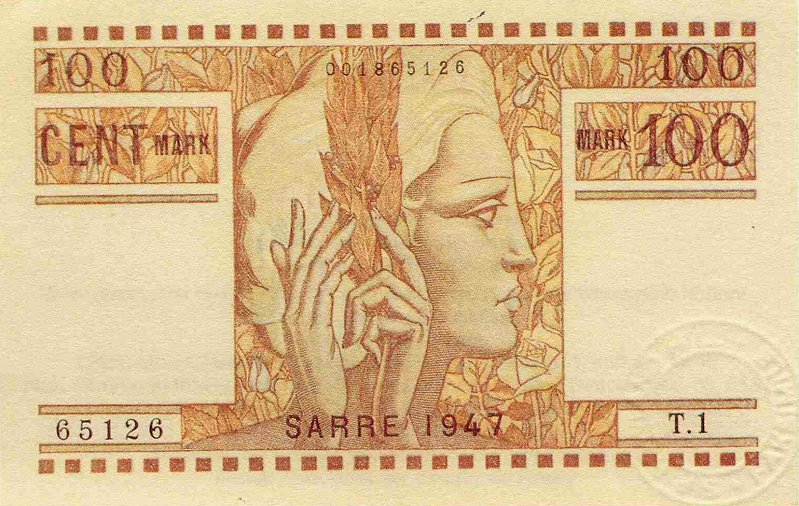

Denominations
- Banknotes: 1, 2, 5, 10, 50, 100

Demographics
- Date of introduction: 16 June 1947
- Replaced: Reichsmark
- Date of withdrawal: 20 November 1947
- Replaced by: French franc (1947); Saar franc (1954) (Note: French franc with German markings.)
- User(s): Saar Protectorate

Issuance
- Central bank: Banque de France

Valuation
- Pegged with: French franc (20 French francs = 1 Saar mark)
- This infobox shows the latest status before this currency was rendered obsolete.

The Saar mark was a currency issued on 16 June 1947 by the French government for use in Saar. It was at par with the German Reichsmark, and composed of six denominations of banknotes, 1, 2, 5, 10, 50 and 100 mark. The aim of its introduction was to prepare an economic union of the Saar with France. In addition, the exchange enabled the French administration to get an overview of the total amount of capital available in the Saar region. It also served to prevent speculative capital transfers between the Saar and the rest of Germany in view of the introduction of the franc.

However, the Saar mark notes were soon replaced following the integration of the Saar into the French currency area. The Saar franc was the currency of the Saar Protectorate and, later, the state of Saarland in the Federal Republic of Germany between 20 November 1947 and 6 July 1959. It was valued at par with the French franc, and French coins and banknotes circulated alongside local issues.

== History ==
The French Government issued on 5 June 1947 a decree creating an economic mission under the authority of the Military Governor whose task was to manage economic problems in Saarland. The Saar Mark began circulating on 16 June.

The end of the Saar mark and its replacement by the French franc was enterined by a law of the French Parliament on 15 November 1947.
