= Banknotes of the Czechoslovak koruna =

Banknotes of the Czechoslovak koruna may refer to:

- Banknotes of the Czechoslovak koruna (1919)
- Banknotes of the Slovak koruna (1939-45)
- Banknotes of the Czechoslovak koruna (1945)
- Banknotes of the Czechoslovak koruna (1953)

== See also ==
- Czech koruna#Banknotes, from 1993
