= Banknotes of the Czechoslovak koruna (1919) =

Czechoslovak koruna
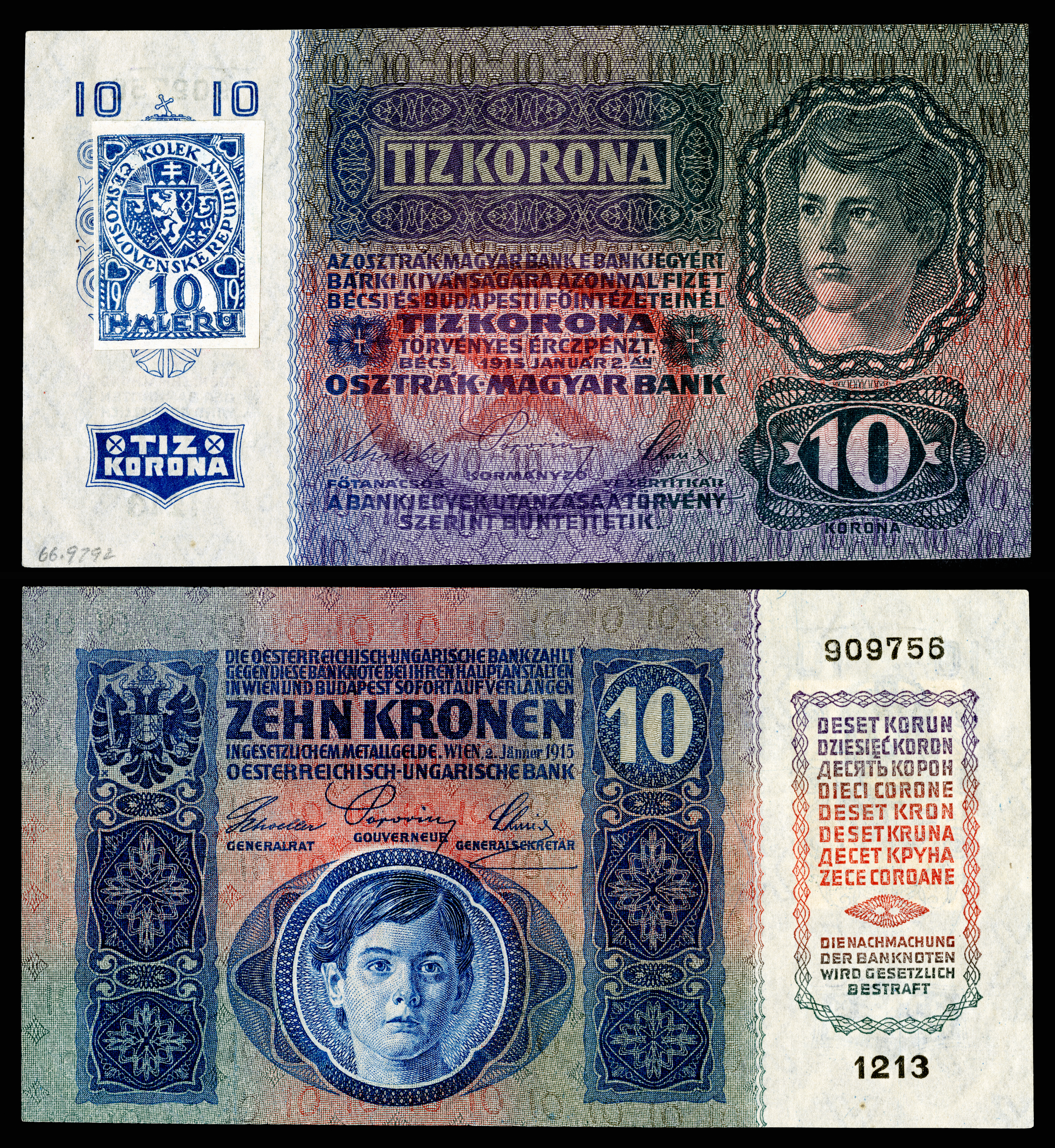
- Austro-Hungarian 10 Kčs banknote with 10 haléřů stamp

ISO 4217
- Code: CZK
- Subunit: 0.01

Unit
- Unit: Koruna
- Symbol: Kč

Denominations
- Subunit
- 1/100: Haléř
- Symbol
- Haléř: h
- Banknotes
- Freq. used: 10, 20, 50, 100, 500, 1000 korun

Demographics
- Date of introduction: 1919Provisional issue
- User(s): Czechoslovakia

Issuance
- Central bank: Czechoslovak National Bank

Valuation
- Inflation: Stable
- This infobox shows the latest status before this currency was rendered obsolete.

The first banknotes in First Czechoslovak Republic were issues of the Austro-Hungarian Bank to which adhesive stamps were affixed. Denominations were of 10, 20, 50, 100 and 1000 korun (provisional issue). Regular banknotes of Czechoslovak koruna were subsequently issued (initially dated 15 April 1919) by the Republic of Czechoslovakia between 1919 and 1926, in denominations of 1, 5, 10, 20, 50, 100, 500, 1000 and 5000 korun. The Czechoslovak National Bank took over production in 1926, issuing notes for 10, 20, 50, 100, 500 and 1000 korun. The new designs were made by Alfons Mucha, one of the founders of Art Nouveau and a Slavic nationalist. The urgency of the task led him to reuse a previous portrait of Josephine Crane Bradley as Slavia for the 100 koruna bill.

== Provisional issue (1919) ==
Republic of Czechoslovakia, Provisional Issue (1919)
Value	Image	Date	Base date
10 Korun		1919	2 Jan 1915
20 Korun		1919	2 Jan 1913
50 Korun		1919	2 Jan 1914
100 Korun		1919	2 Jan 1912
1,000 Korun		1919	2 Jan 1902

== See also ==
- Banknotes of the Czechoslovak koruna (1945)
- Banknotes of the Czechoslovak koruna (1953)
- Bohemian and Moravian koruna
