= Coins of the Czechoslovak koruna (1919) =

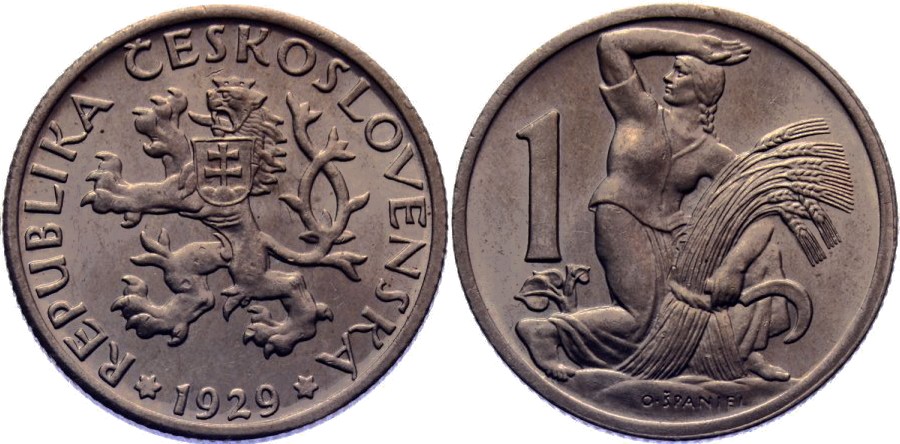

In 1921, coins were introduced in denominations of 20 and 50 haleru, followed by 10h and 1 koruna in 1922, 2 and 5h in 1923, 5 korun in 1925, 10 korun in 1930, and 25h and 20 korun in 1933. The 2h was struck in zinc, the 5 and 10h in bronze, and the 20, 25 and 50h and 1 koruna in cupro-nickel. The 5 koruna was struck in cupro-nickel until 1928, when a silver version was introduced. This denomination reverted to cupro-nickel in 1938. The 10 and 20 korun were issued in silver.
