= Banknotes of the Czechoslovak koruna (1953) =

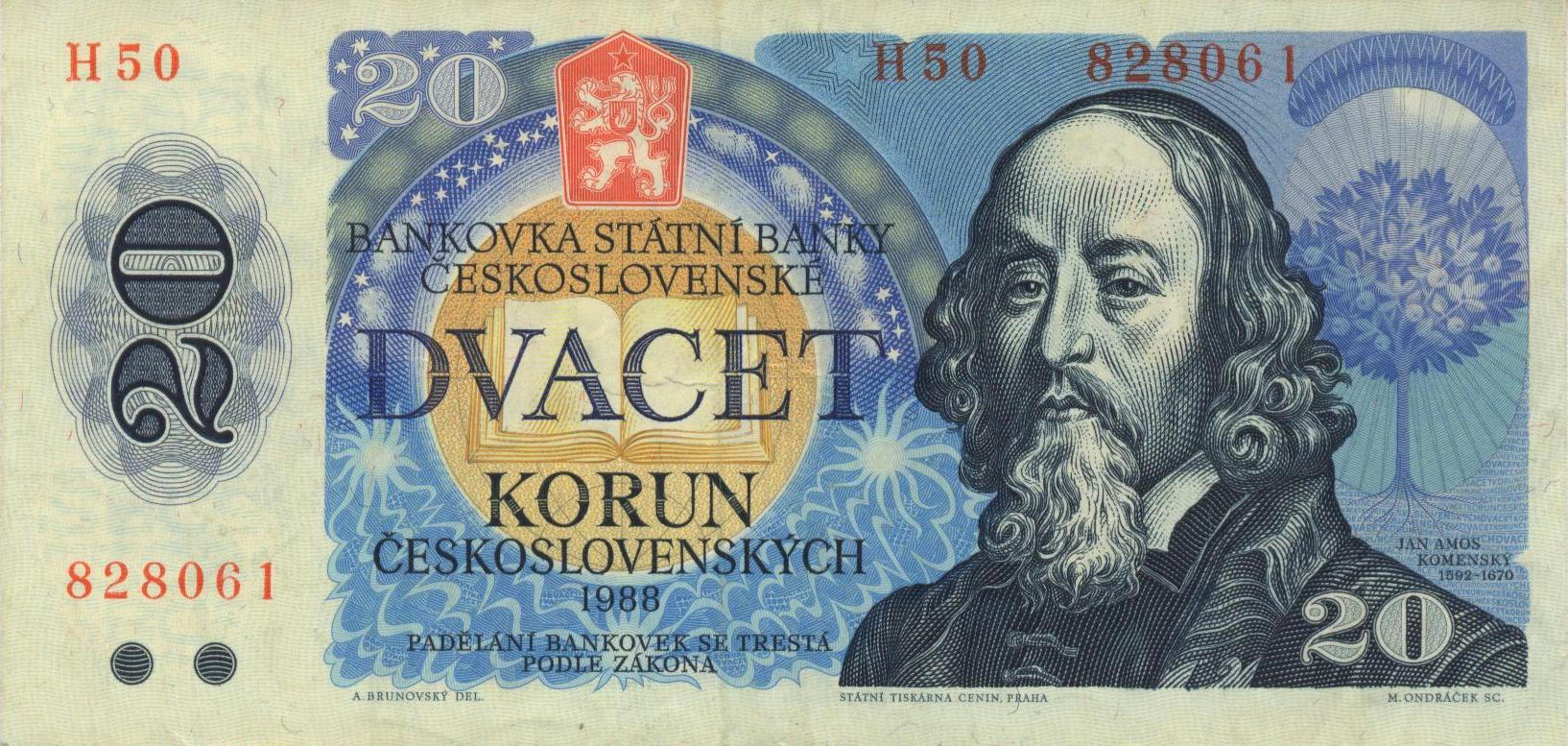
20 Kčs banknote, 1988, obverse

The first banknotes of the third Czechoslovak koruna were issued by the Communist Party of Czechoslovakia in denominations of 1, 3 and 5 korun (state notes) and by the State Bank in denominations of 10, 25, 50 and 100 korun (banknotes).

From 1958, new 25, 10, 100 and finally 50 Kčs banknotes were designed, and the state notes were gradually replaced by coins during the 1960s. The 20 Kčs banknote was printed from 1970 to replace the 25 Kčs note. The 500 Kčs banknote appeared in 1973. Starting with the 1000 Kčs banknote in 1985, a new, more uniform series (designer: Albín Brunovský) was issued adding a new denomination each year. This process was interrupted by the fall of the communism (and finally by the dissolution of the country) : the new 100 Kčs note issued in 1989 depicted Klement Gottwald, a prominent communist, and was quickly withdrawn after the Velvet Revolution. A new 500 Kčs banknote was meant to be released by 1990 but had stopped in April of 1990 after the end of communism in Czechoslovakia. A reissue of the 100 Kčs banknote from 1961 was made in 1990 as people vandalzied the one from 1989, portraying Klement Gottwald and a supply was needed for the most widely used bill at that time. This reissue was issued on 1 March 1990, even though some pages, sites refer them as "1990-1992"(specifically the period of the Czech and Slovak Federative Republic) as supposedly they were only seen/entered circulation after the Czechoslovak Socialist Republic was dissolved.

Value	Dimensions	Main colour	Language	Description		Date of		
Value	Dimensions	Main colour	Language	Obverse	Reverse	printing	issue	withdrawal
1958 series
25 Kčs	140 × 69 mm	Blue	Czech and Slovak	Jan Žižka	The Jan Žižka Square in Tábor	1958	1 December 1958	31 December 1972
1960–1964 series
3 Kčs	113 × 55 mm	Blue	Slovak and Czech	Indication of value	Coat of arms	1961	1 December 1961	31 December 1967
5 Kčs	123 × 59 mm	Green	Czech and Slovak	Indication of value	Coat of arms	1961	1 December 1961	31 December 1967
10 Kčs	134 × 65 mm	Brown	Slovak	Elementary school pupils Margita Lešková (left) and Marta Lajmonová (right)	View of the Orava reservoir	1960	1 December 1961	30 June 1988
25 Kčs	140 × 69 mm	Blue	Czech and Slovak	Jan Žižka	The Jan Žižka Square in Tábor	1961	2 May 1962	31 December 1972
50 Kčs	150 × 75 mm	Red	Slovak	A Russian soldier and a partisan	The Slovnaft refinery in Bratislava	1964	1 April 1965	30 June 1991
100 Kčs	165 × 81 mm	Green	Czech	Peasant couple	View of Prague with the castle and the Charles Bridge	1961	1 December 1962	7 February 1993
100 Kčs	165 × 81 mm	Green	Czech	Peasant couple	View of Prague with the castle and the Charles Bridge	1990-1992	1 March 1990	7 February 1993
1970–1973 series
20 Kčs	134 × 59 mm	Blue	Czech	Jan Žižka	Imitation of a codex illustration	1970	1 April 1971	30 June 1991
500 Kčs	153 × 67 mm	Brown	Slovak	Partisans of the SNP 1944	Devín Castle	1973	1 November 1973	7 February 1993
1985–1989 series
10 Kčs	133 × 67 mm	Brown	Slovak	Pavol Országh-Hviezdoslav	Orava scene	1986	1 July 1986	7 February 1993
20 Kčs	138 × 67 mm	Blue	Czech	Comenius	Illustration related to culture and education	1988	1 October 1988	7 February 1993
50 Kčs	143 × 67 mm	Red	Slovak	Ľudovít Štúr	View of Bratislava with the castle (from the restaurant on the top of the pylon of the Most SNP)	1987	1 October 1987	7 February 1993
100 Kčs	148 × 67 mm	Green	Czech	Klement Gottwald	View of Prague with the castle and the Charles Bridge	1989	1 October 1989	31 December 1990
500 Kčs	152x67 mm	Cherry Red	Slovak	Motive of the Slovak National Uprising	View of the Strečno Castle above the Váh	1990	Unissued	
1000 Kčs	158 × 67 mm	Blue	Czech	Bedřich Smetana	View of the Vltava at Vyšehrad	1985	1 October 1985	7 February 1993

== See also ==
- Banknotes of the Czechoslovak koruna (1919)
- Banknotes of the Czechoslovak koruna (1945)
