= Banknotes of the Czechoslovak koruna (1945) =

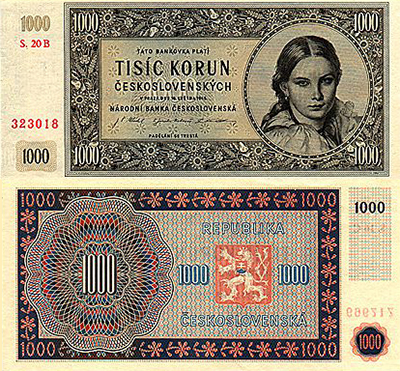
1000 Kčs banknote, 1945

In 1945, four kinds of banknotes of Czechoslovak koruna were introduced. The first were issues of Bohemia and Moravia and Slovakia, to which adhesive stamps were affixed. Denominations issued were 100, 500 and 1000 korun. The second (dated 1944) were printed in the Soviet Union and were issued in denominations of 1, 5, 20, 100, 500 and 1000 korun. The third were locally printed notes issued by the government in denominations of 1, 5, 10, 20, 50, 100, 500, 1000 and 2000 korun. The fourth were issues of the National Bank of Czechoslovakia, in denominations of 1000 and 5000 korun. The National Bank issued 500 korun notes from 1946, whilst the government continued to issue notes between 5 and 100 korun, the 1 koruna note being replaced by a coin in 1946.

== See also ==
- Banknotes of the Czechoslovak koruna (1919)
- Banknotes of the Czechoslovak koruna (1953)
- Bohemian and Moravian koruna
