= Slovak koruna (1939–1945) =

Currency of the Slovak Republic

koruna slovenská (Slovak)
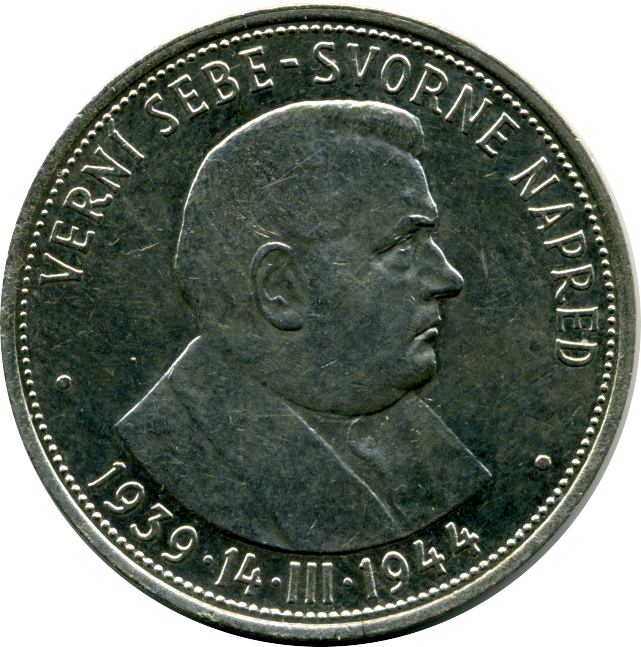
50-koruna coin with Jozef Tiso
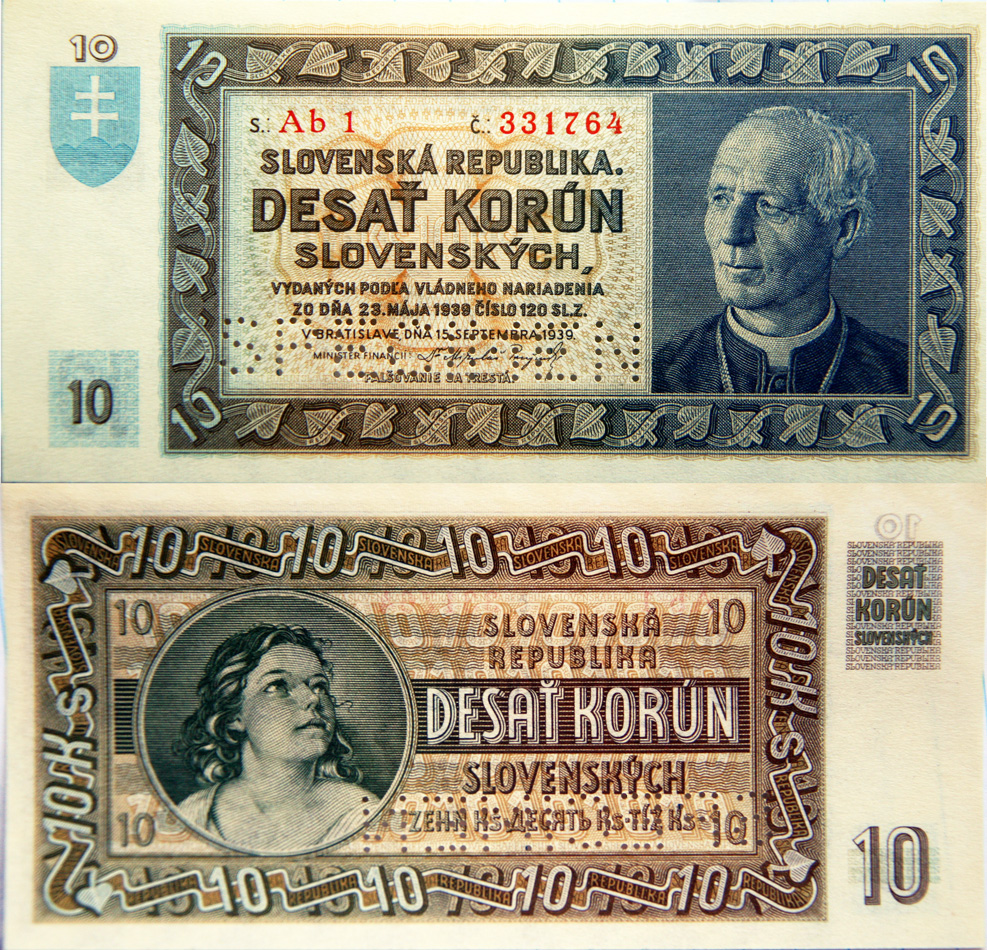
10-koruna note with Andrej Hlinka

Unit
- Plural: The language(s) of this currency belong(s) to the Slavic languages. There is more than one way to construct plural forms.
- Symbol: Ks

Denominations
- Subunit
- 1/100: halierov
- Banknotes: 5, 10, 20, 50, 100, 500, 1000, 5000 korun
- Coins: 5, 10, 20, 50 halier, 1, 5, 10, 20, 50 korun

Demographics
- User(s): First Slovak Republic

Issuance
- Central bank: Slovenská národna banka
- This infobox shows the latest status before this currency was rendered obsolete.

The Slovak koruna or Slovak crown (Slovak: koruna slovenská, Ks) was the currency of the Nazi-era Slovak Republic between 1939 and 1945. The Slovak koruna replaced the Czechoslovak koruna at par and was replaced by the reconstituted Czechoslovak koruna, again at par.

Initially, the Slovak koruna was at par with the Bohemian and Moravian koruna, with 10 korunas = 1 Reichsmark. It was devalued, on 1 October 1940, to a rate of 11.62 Slovak korunas to one Reichsmark, while the value of the Bohemian and Moravian currency remained unchanged against the Reichsmark.

== Coins ==
In 1939, coins were introduced in denominations of 10 halierov, 5 and 20 korunas, with 20 and 50 halierov and 1 koruna added in 1940. The 10 and 20 halierov were bronze, the 50 halierov and 1 koruna cupronickel, the 5 korunas nickel and the 20 korunas were silver. In 1942, zinc 5 halierov were introduced and aluminium replaced bronze in the 20 halierov. Aluminium 50 halierov followed in 1943. Silver 10 and 50 korunas were introduced in 1944.

Compared to the pre-war Czechoslovak koruna, the Slovak koruna coins had an additional 50 Ks, the silver content of the 10 and 20 Ks coins was reduced from 700 ‰ to 500 ‰ and all but 5 Ks shrank in physical sizes. The designers were Anton Hám, Andrej Peter, Gejza Angyal, Ladislav Majerský and František Štefunko. Coins were minted in the Kremnica mint.

World War II Issues
Image		Value	Technical parameters			Description			Date of		
Obverse	Reverse	Value	Diameter	Mass	Composition	Edge	Obverse	Reverse	first minting	issue	withdrawal
		5 h	14 mm	0.94 g	Zinc	Smooth	Coat of arms, SLOVENSKÁ REPUBLIKA^{1}, year of minting	Value	1942	14 December 1942	31 December 1947
		10 h	16 mm	1.65 g	Brass; 92% copper 8% zinc	Smooth	Coat of arms, "SLOVENSKÁ REPUBLIKA", year of minting	Value, view of Bratislava with the castle and the Danube	1939	20 November 1939	31 December 1947
		20 h	18 mm	2.5 g	Brass; 92% copper 8% zinc	Smooth	Coat of arms, "SLOVENSKÁ REPUBLIKA", year of minting	Value, view of the Nitra Castle	1940	15 May 1940	31 July 1943
		20 h	18 mm	0.65 g	Aluminium	Smooth	Coat of arms, "SLOVENSKÁ REPUBLIKA", year of minting	Value, view of the Nitra Castle	1942	28 November 1942	31 May 1948
		50 h	20 mm	3.33 g	Cupronickel; 80% copper 20% nickel	Smooth	Coat of arms, "SLOVENSKÁ REPUBLIKA", year of minting	Value, plough	1940	12 March 1941	29 February 1948
		50 h	20 mm	0.97 g	Aluminium	Milled	Coat of arms, "SLOVENSKÁ REPUBLIKA", year of minting	Value, plough	1943	15 September 1943	29 February 1948
		1 Ks	22 mm	5 g	Cupronickel; 80% copper 20% nickel	Milled	Coat of arms, "SLOVENSKÁ REPUBLIKA", year of minting	Value	1940	31 December 1940	31 May 1947
		5 Ks	27 mm	8 g	Nickel	Milled	Coat of arms, value, year of minting	Andrej Hlinka, "ZA BOHA ŽIVOT. ZA NÁROD SLOBODU"	1939	26 July 1939	31 May 1947
		10 Ks	29 mm	7 g	500‰ silver	Smooth	Coat of arms, "SLOVENSKÁ REPUBLIKA", year of minting	Value, Pribina, "PRIBINA + 861 KNIEŽA SLOVENSKA"	1944	10 August 1944	31 December 1947
		20 Ks	31 mm	15 g	500‰ silver	Milled	Coat of arms, "SLOVENSKÁ REPUBLIKA", value	Jozef Tiso, "DR. JOZEF TISO - PRVÝ PREZIDENT SLOVENSKEJ REPUBLIKY", date of minting	1939	26 October 1939	31 December 1947
		20 Ks	31 mm	15 g	500‰ silver	Milled	Coat of arms, "SLOVENSKÁ REPUBLIKA", year of minting	Value, Saints Cyril and Methodius	1941	6 October 1941	31 December 1947
		50 Ks	34 mm	16.5 g	700‰ silver	Milled	Coat of arms, "SLOVENSKÁ REPUBLIKA", value	Jozef Tiso, "VERNÍ SEBE - SVORNE NAPRED", year of minting	1944	13 March 1944	31 December 1947
These images are to scale at 2.5 pixels per millimeter, a standard for world coins. For table standards, see the coin specification table.

== Banknotes ==
In 1939, Czechoslovak notes for 100, 500 and 1000 korún were issued with Slovak Republic overprinted on them for use in Slovakia. That year also saw the introduction of 10 and 20 koruna notes by the government.

Denomination	Image	Obverse	Reverse	Date of issue	Replaced by Kčs
5 korún 122 × 59 mm	20 korún	10-year-old girl Hanička Ištvanikova	Motives of Slovak nature	15 February 1945	31 October 1945
10 korún 142 × 72 mm	10 korún	Catholic priest Andrej Hlinka	Young girl, Value	23 October 1939	31 October 1945
10 korún 131 × 62 mm	10 korún	Linguist Ľudovít Štúr	Slovak manufacture products	26 October 1944	31 October 1945
20 korún 153 × 76 mm	20 korún	Catholic priest Andrej Hlinka	Tomb of Milan Rastislav Štefánik on the Bradlo Hill	9 December 1939	31 October 1945
20 korún 139 × 67 mm	20 korún	Poet and translator Ján Hollý	Slovak dining utensils	25 September 1943	31 October 1945
50 korún 127 × 67 mm	50 korún	Children with Slovak Kroje	Orava Castle	18 December 1940	31 October 1945
100 korún 127 × 73 mm	100 korún	Prince Pribina	Slavic inhabitant	1 September 1941	31 October 1945
500 korún 175 × 85 mm	500 korún	National highwayman, Juraj Jánošík	Tatra Mountains	26 October 1944	31 October 1945
1000 korún 192 × 90 mm	1000 korún	Svatopluk I of Great Moravia	Coat of arms of Slovakia	17 August 1942	31 October 1945
5000 korún 203 × 96 mm	5000 korún	Mojmir I of Moravia	Coat of arms of Slovakia	Only printed	Only printed
