= Strečno =

- Municipality
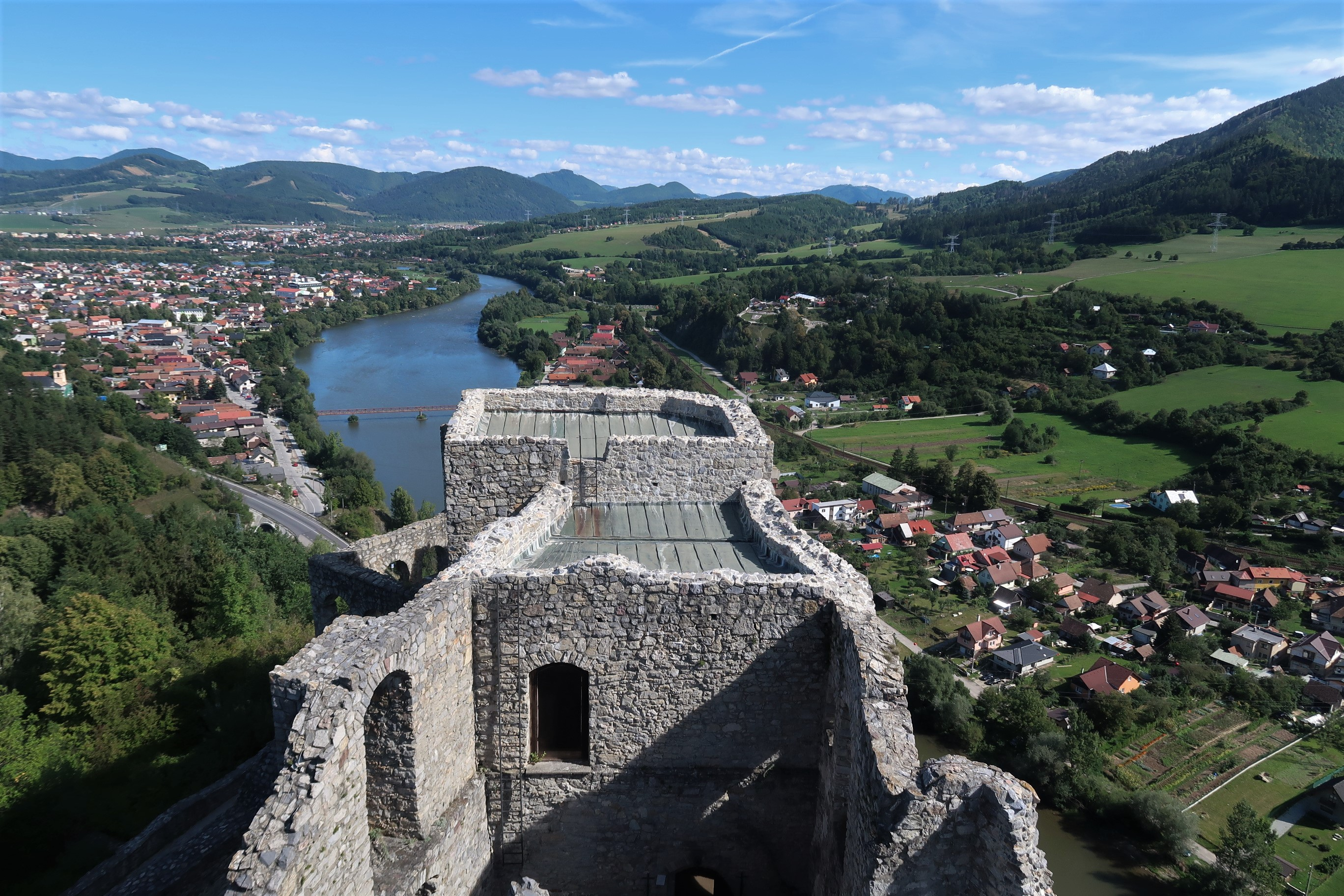
- Strečno village viewed from Strečno Castle

- Flag

- Location of Strečno in the Žilina Region Location of Strečno in Slovakia
- Coordinates: 49.19°N 18.87°E
- Country: Slovakia
- Region: Žilina Region
- District: Žilina District
- First mentioned: 1300

Area
  - Total: 13.17 km^{2} (5.08 sq mi)
- Elevation: 358 m (1,175 ft)

Population (2025)
  - Total: 2,553
- Time zone: UTC+1 (CET)
  - Summer (DST): UTC+2 (CEST)
- Postal code: 132 4
- Area code: +421 41
- Vehicle registration plate (until 2022): ZA
- Website: www.strecno.sk

Strečno (Hungarian: Sztrecsény) is a village and municipality in the Žilina District in the Žilina Region in North Slovakia. It is located by the Váh River in the Malá Fatra Mts. Situated 7 km east from Žilina, Strečno is most famous for its gothic castle ruins.

== History ==
In historical records the village was first mentioned in 1300. The castle, built in the beginning 14th century by Matthew III Csák was destroyed in 1698.

During World War II, participants of the Slovak National Uprising and German Army clashed in brutal battles in the gorges of Strečno.

== Geography ==
The municipality lies at an altitude of 358 metres (1,175 ft) and covers an area of 13.17 km^{2} (5.08 sq mi) (2025).

== Population ==
Population statistic (10 years)
Year	1995	2005	2015	2025
Count	2430	2656	2556	2553
Difference		+9.30%	−3.76%	−0.11%

Population statistic
Year	2024	2025
Count	2572	2553
Difference		−0.73%

It has a population of 2553 people (31 December 2025).

=== Ethnicity ===
Census 2021 (1+ %)
Ethnicity	Number	Fraction
Slovak	2539	97.16%
Not found out	54	2.06%
Total	2613	

In year 2021 was 2613 people by ethnicity 2539 as Slovak, 54 as Not found out, 22 as Czech, 15 as Other, 4 as Ukrainian, 2 as Vietnamese, 2 as Italian, 2 as Serbian, 2 as Romani, 2 as Russian, 2 as Polish, 2 as German, 2 as Hungarian, 2 as English, 1 as Jewish, 1 as Silesian, 1 as Rusyn, 1 as Romanian, 1 as Austrian, 1 as Moravian, 1 as Korean, 1 as Canadian, 1 as Croatian and 1 as Bulgarian.

Note on population: The difference values of population numbers in the table "Population statistic" and in the sections "Ethnicity" & "Religion" is caused by the use of various statistical methods.

=== Religion ===
Census 2021 (1+ %)
Religion	Number	Fraction
Roman Catholic Church	2207	84.46%
None	251	9.61%
Not found out	45	1.72%
Evangelical Church	29	1.11%
Total	2613	

In year 2021 was 2613 people by religion 2207 from Roman Catholic Church, 251 from None, 45 from Not found out, 29 from Evangelical Church, 24 from Greek Catholic Church, 19 from Christian Congregations in Slovakia, 8 from Islam, 6 from Eastern Orthodox Church, 5 from Other, 5 from Ad hoc movements, 4 from Paganism and natural spirituality, 4 from Buddhism, 2 from Other and not ascertained christian church, 1 from Jewish community, 1 from Old Catholic Church, 1 from Calvinist Church and 1 from Hinduism.

== Gallery ==
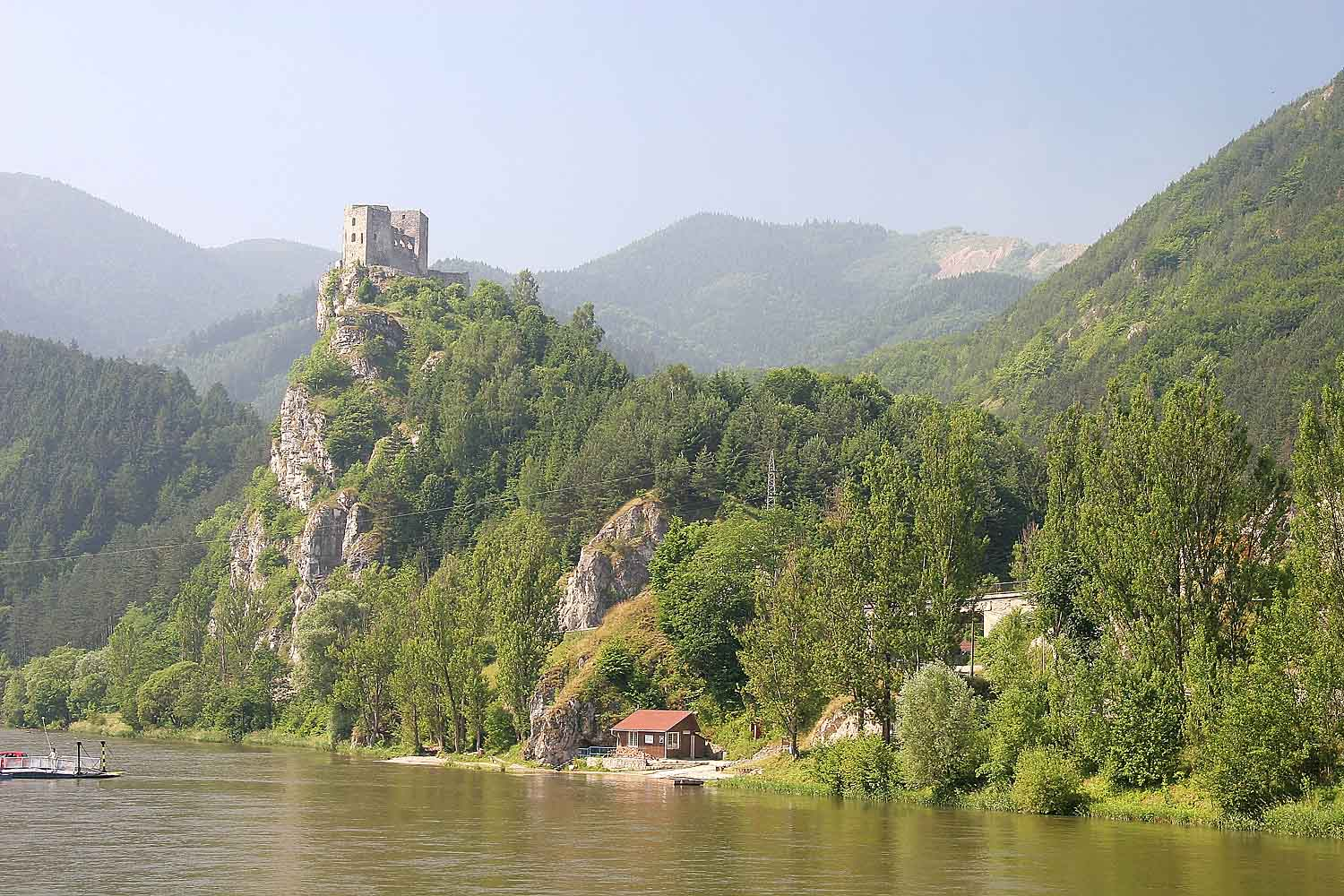
Strečno Castle ruins and the Váh River

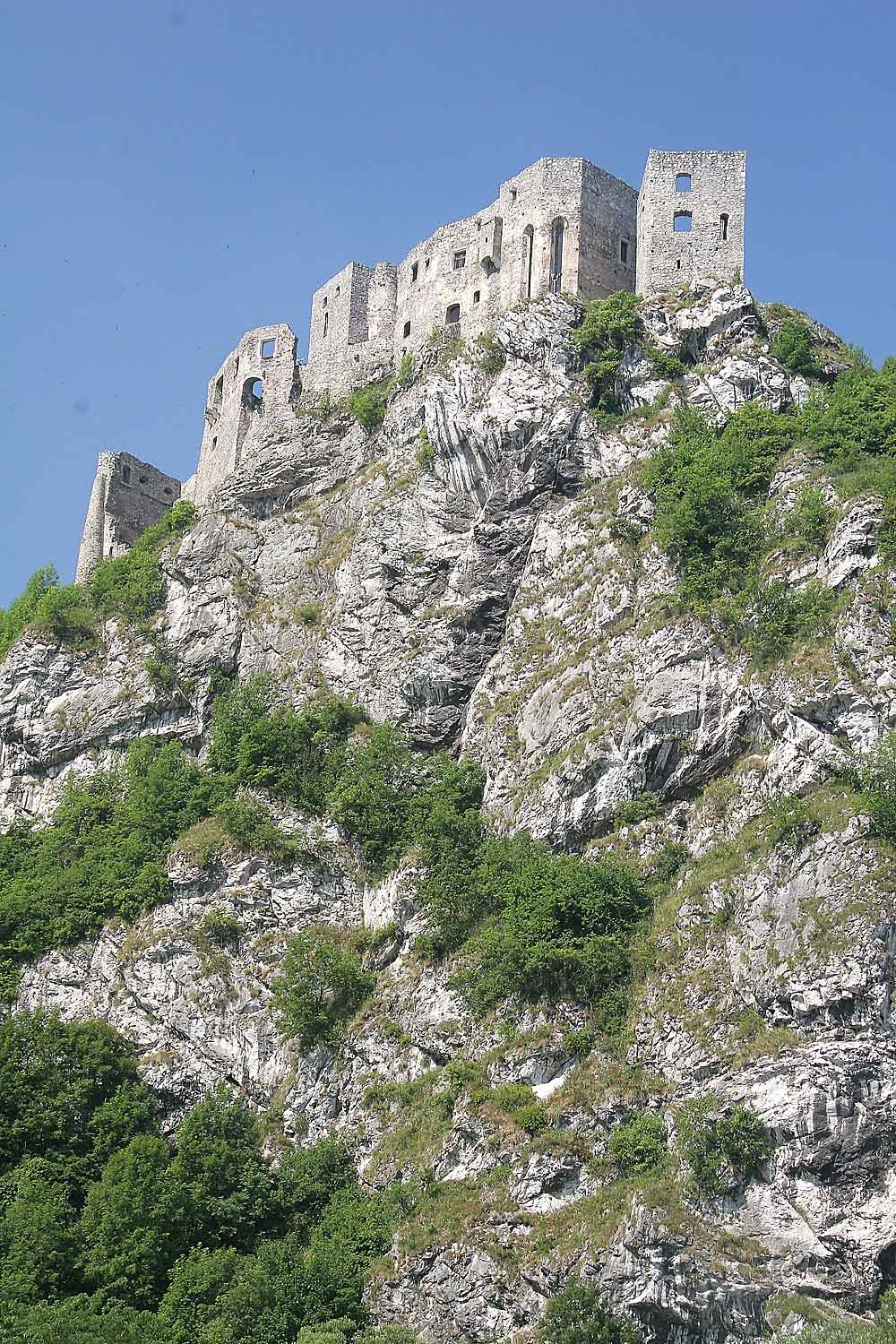
Strečno Castle

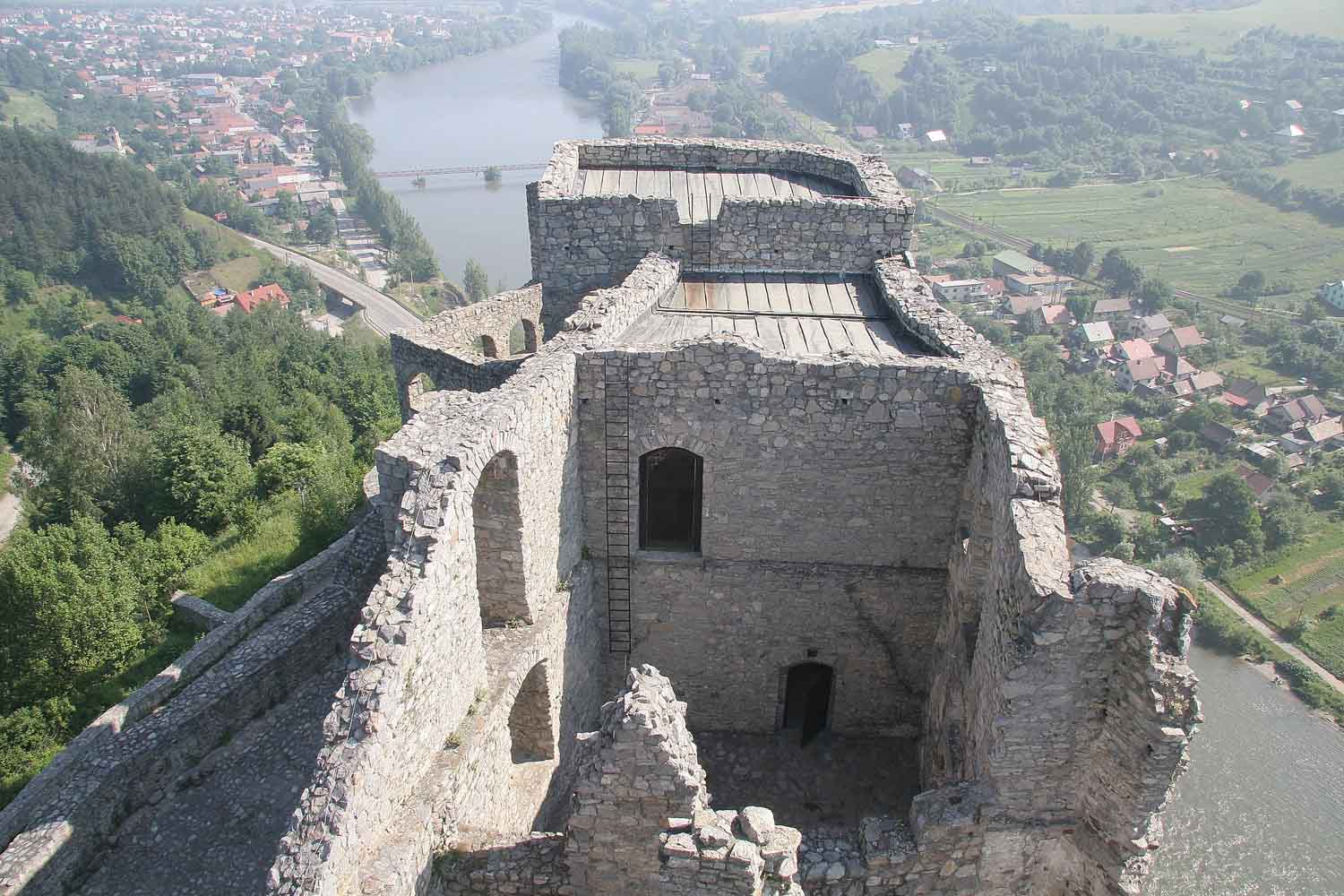
Village from the castle

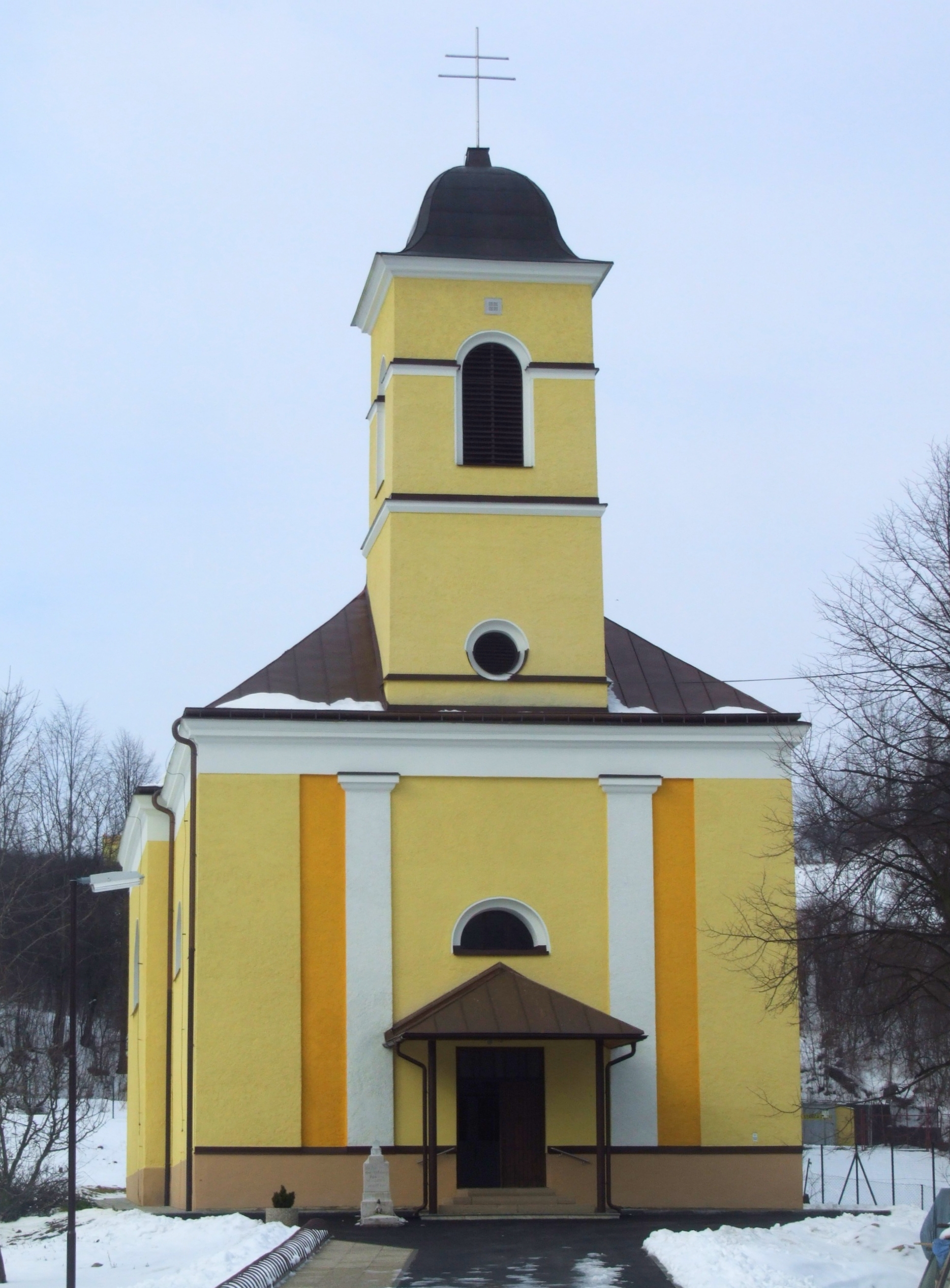
Church in village
