= Strečno Castle =

Historic site in Slovakia

Coordinates: 49°10′37″N 18°51′46″E

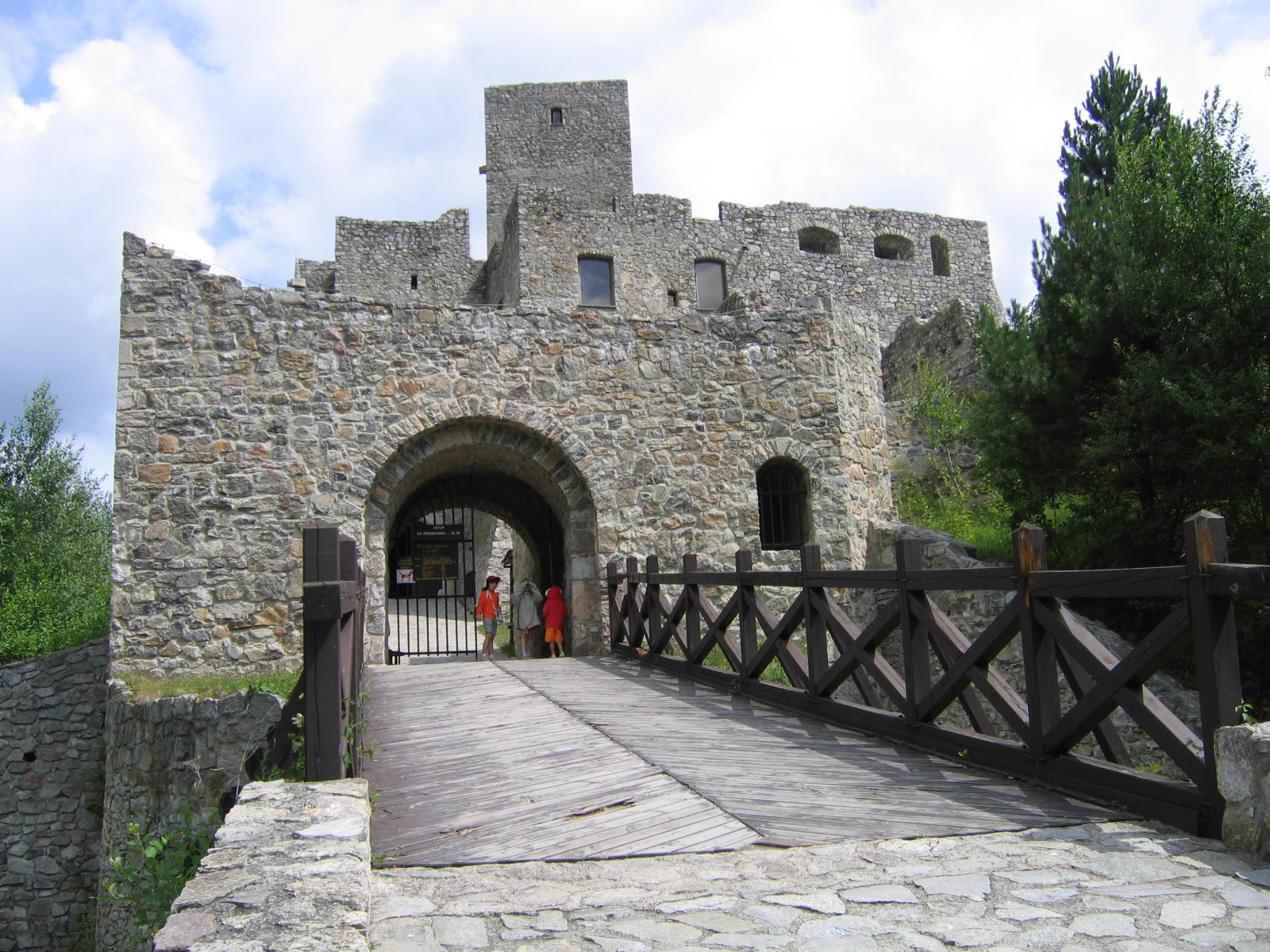
Entrance gate

The Strečno Castle (Slovak: Strečniansky hrad, Hungarian: sztrecsényi vár; also called Strechun, Strechyn, Streczen, Streczan alebo Strežín) is a reconstructed ruin of a medieval castle of an irregular plan located in northern Slovakia, 12 km east of Žilina. The castle stands on a 103-metre-high (338 ft) calcite cliff above the international road E50 and village Strečno. Along with the Old castle (Slovak: Starhrad) constitutes a significant landscape landmark of the Upper Váh region. Nowadays, after reconstruction, there are expositions of the Vah region regional museum (Slovak: Považské múzeum v Žiline). The first recorded mention of the stone castle is from 1316. Today the castle belongs to the national cultural heritage of the Slovak republic.

== History ==
=== Early history ===
A strategic location of the cliff massif rising 103 meters high above the river Váh and above a strategic road located in a narrow strait of the Strečno col was an important prerequisite for building a fortified guardian building. The hill was inhabited already in the late Iron Age. During the earlier Roman period there was a settlement of the Púchov culture.

=== Formation of the castle ===
The first recorded mention of the stone castle is from 1316, during the era of the Kingdom of Hungary. Later, in charter of ispán of Trencsén County from 1358 is an explicit mention about castle and about a toll station collecting a toll for passage over the river Váh under the castle. In this period, the castle was owned by the infamour Hungarian oligarch Matthew III Csák. The oldest part of the castle called small castle, object of the polygonal shaped floor plan of the area of 400 m2 approximately, that consisted of a prism watch tower, a water cistern, a courtyard and a small residential building located in the north eastern corner of the fortification. The access path led from the south through the bridge over a ditch through the main gate. At the end of the first half of the 14th century, the forecastle was completed, providing better control of the main entrance. Later, at the beginning of the 15th century, the northern palace, the chapel and 88 meters deep well on the main courtyard were built during the Barbara of Cilli´s ownership. The new entrance was located in new-built the recruit tower with on the south. Also the northern tower was built in this period. Better defensive capabilities of the castle were secured by the second fortification circuit that defined the area of the southern court and a narrow area of zwinger with three horse-shoe shaped bastions. 4th oval bastion was built in the area of main entrance. After these conversions, the castle became one of the best fortified castles of the middle Váh region. After a period of expansion of the castle, a decline occurs in the early 16th century as a result of frequent changes of the owners. This condition changed after another change - Nicholas and Francis Dersffy started a series of Renaissance conversions.

=== Renaissance conversion ===
A recruit building with an arcade was built in the north castle. Also, an extension of the fortification was realized. Two round bastions located on the north and a rectangular bastion with a forecastle in the south were built, and the previous fortifications were reconstructed and upgraded. These changes were designed to withstand an artillery attack.

=== Baroque conversion ===
The last conversion occurred in the second half of the 17th century during Ferenc Wesselényi´s ownership. The baroque conversion of the fortifications consisted of three new bastions: one on the north, the second on the south and the third between these two on the west. At the end of the 17th century, the castle occupied its greatest area. These modifications took place in the years 1663-1664, while Wesselényi prepared his plot against The House of Habsburg. After the suppression of the plot, the castle was captured by the army of Imre Thököly. During that period, the castle was considered as the most modern castle of The Vah region. In the hands of the rebel army it was very difficult to conquer. This fact posed a security risk to the emperor Leopold I who, after reconquering the castle, ordered its demolition in 1698. The fortifications and the rooves were pulled down. Also the well was filled up. These measures resulted in the deterioration of the castle. The castle fell into ruin for more than 350 years.

=== Period of decline ===
None of the later owners had changed this status. At the beginning of the 20th century, the castle was sold to a businessman, Samuel Hahn. He started demounting the castle for building material. Luckily, the profit was not as big as he expected, so he stopped that activity. Also, the catholic church stands up against the destruction of Hahn. In the 1944, from 31. August 1944 to 3. September during the World War II., there were Fight in the Strečno Gorge (Slovak: Bitka v Strečnianskej tiesňave) - an important fight of Slovak National Uprising between German Ohlen and Jung´s group and The first Czechoslovak army commanded by J. Dobrovodký and E. Perko along with partisans led by col. G. de Lannurien. During these fights, the castle was damaged by German bombs during the artillery attack on Czechoslovak positions at the castle.

=== Reconstruction ===
A bad condition of the object endangering high-road below resulted in a discussion about the acute importance of reconstruction in the 1960s. A decade later, in 1974, the reconstruction started and lasted for 21 years until 1995 because of its technical and financial complexity. Unluckily, the result of the reconstruction was not ideal. A lot of monolithic concrete and built constructions have been used, which changed the previous romantic character of ruins.

=== Presence ===
Nowadays, the castle appears between a ruin and a well-preserved castle because the roofs were not rebuilt to their original look. After the castle was rebuilt, the region museum was exposed. From 1965, 22 parts of the castle were registered on the list of national cultural heritage.

== Description of the castle ==
=== Castle chapel ===
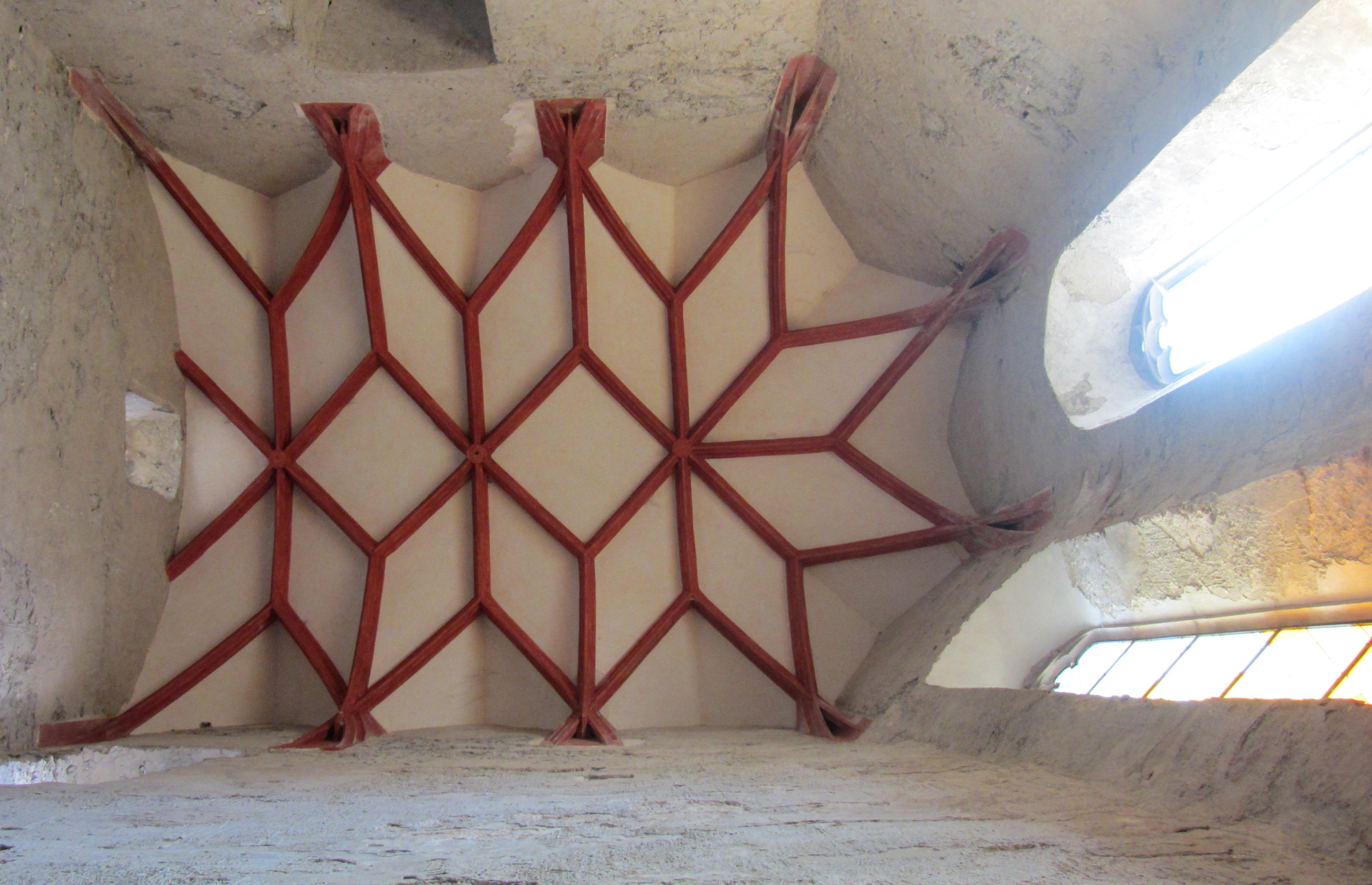
Reconstructed Stellar Rib Vault in the castle chapel

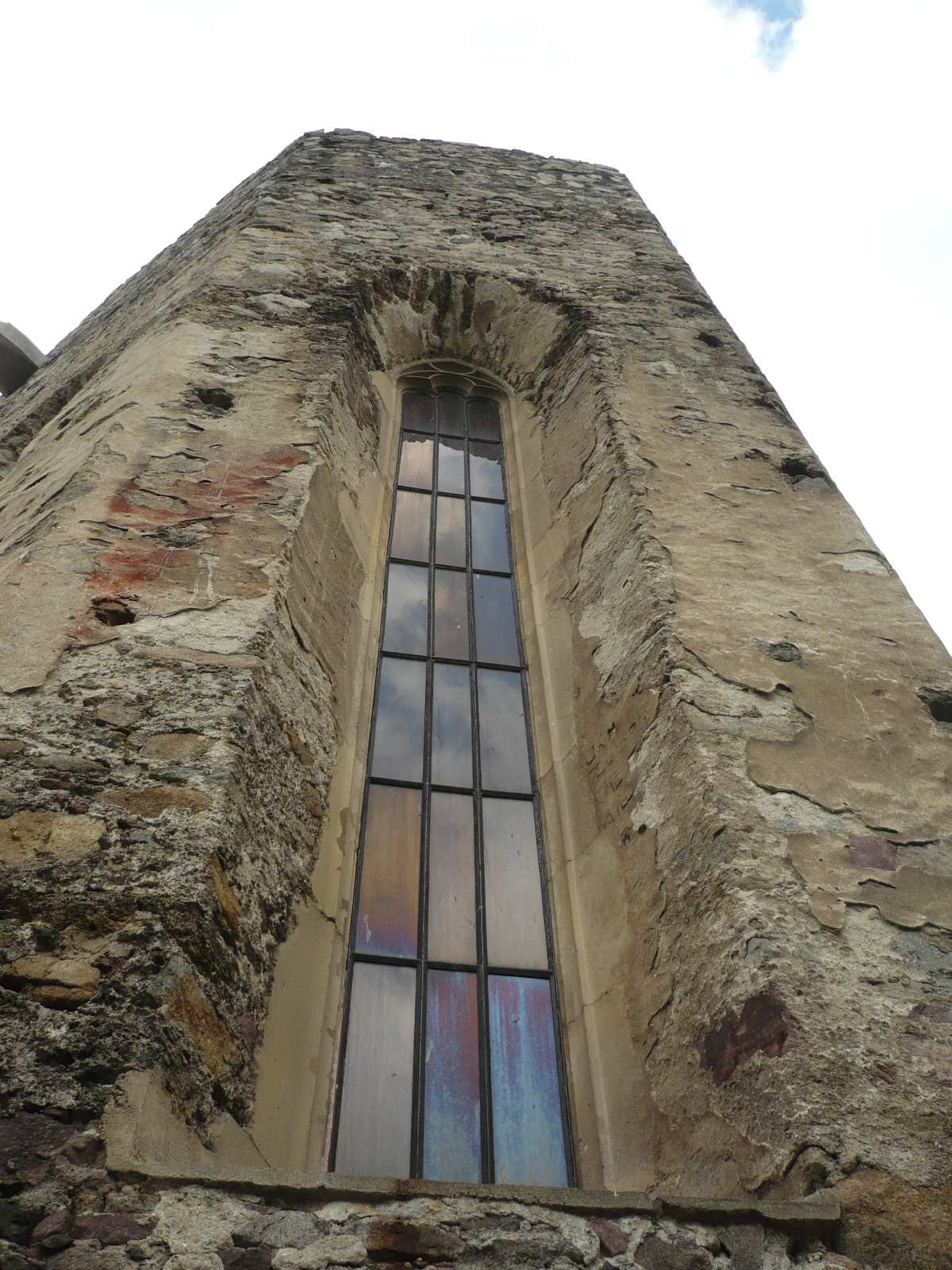
Gothic window of the chapel on the eastern facade

The chapel was built in the first half of the 15th century in the era of Sigisbund of Luxemburg´s second wife Barbara of Cilli´s ownership. It bound to the northern wall of the palace. Originally, it was nave not-vaulted object with beamed ceiling. It was vaulted with a stellar rib vault with a wedge-profiled rib later in the 15th century. Only original parts of the vault are capitals, rest of the vault was rebuilt during a reconstruction in the second half of the 20th century with original stone elements found by archaeologist and with new ones. The light passes into the object through two original gothic windows located in the eastern part of the chapel, behind the altar. In the past, there were two wooden platforms connected with a wooden stair in the western part of the chapel. These platforms were providing access to the chapel. The chapel was accessible from the northern palace and from the northern tower on the third floor level. Main entrance to the chapel was placed in the south wall at the second floor level. At the level of the first floor, there is a small orthogonal sacristy adjacent to the southern wall of the chapel. In the past, this room was vaulted with a barrel vault.

=== Main tower ===
It is also called a bergried. It is a well preserved stone object with a floor plan of square of side 8 m. The tower is one of the oldest parts of the castle, dated to the period of emergence of the object at the beginning of the 14th century. Originally, it was a 5-storey building with wooden beam floors connected with the wooden ladders. The entrance was located at the second-floor level through the Gothic pointed-arch-shaped portal accessible through the small wooden bridge. A circular entrance to the 8 meter deep prison cell is located on the bottom floor. The tower was conceived primarily as a guard and a defensive tower, as indicated by the location of the entrance on the second floor and the low number of small windows. A residential function was provided by small building in the courtyard.

=== Northern palace ===
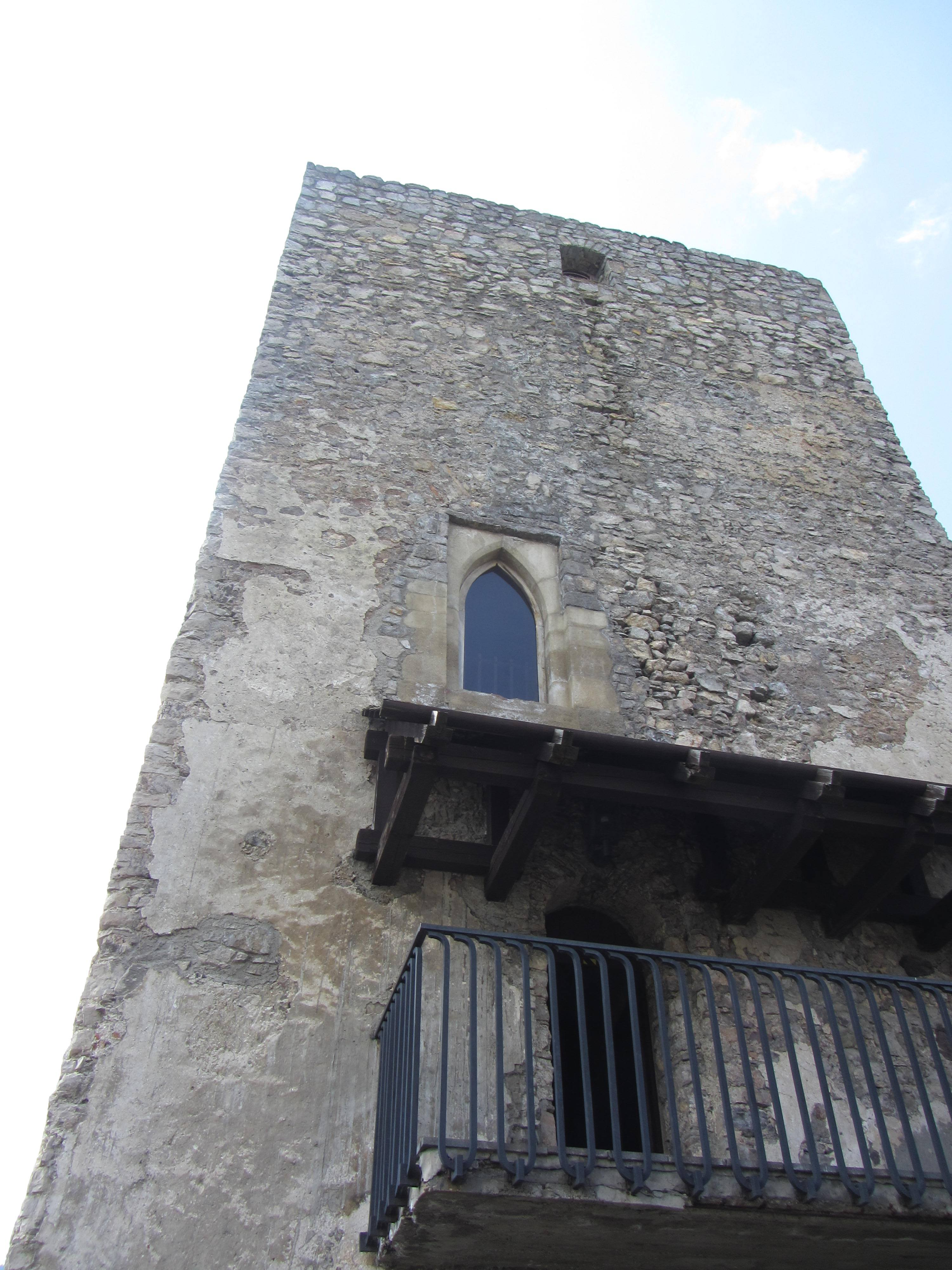
The main tower - northern facade

It is a two-floor object located in the north part of the castle, with a cross vault on the ground floor and a wooden ceiling on the second. It is inconsiderately cemented with a monolithic reinforced concrete desk in presence. On both floors, there was an entrance to the wooden matroneums in the chapel. On the second floor, the palace was equipped with a medieval toilet (garderobe) placed outside, nowadays partly preserved.

=== Cistern ===
It was used to retain rain water, which was needed for castle operations before a well was excavated. The cistern is intagliated into the cliff massif at a depth of 3.5 meters and a diameter of 2.6 meters. It consists of five layers of stone blocks. The bottom was probably insulated with a layer of clay to reduce water loss.

== Photo Gallery ==
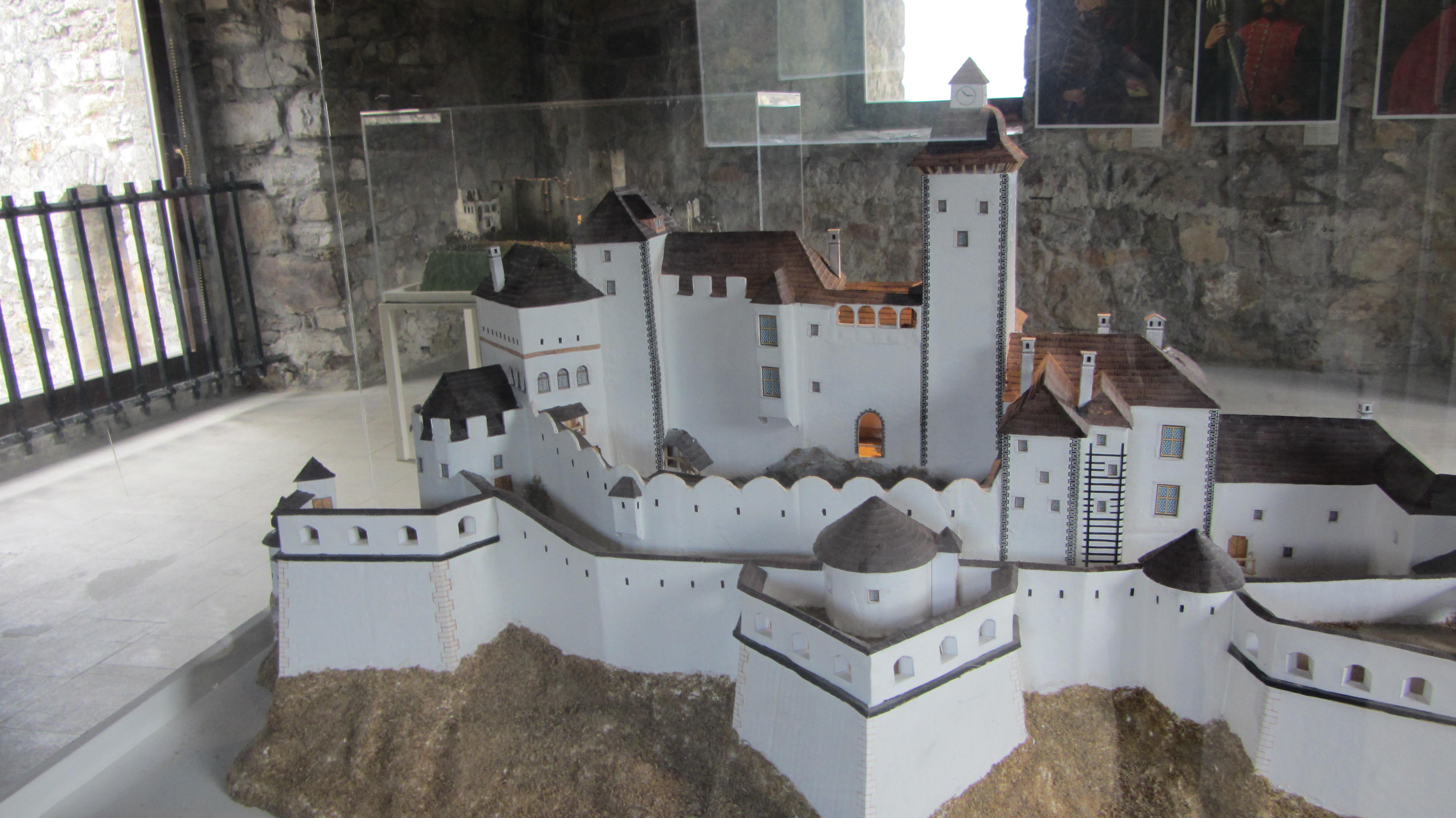
Assumed appearance of the castle at the end of the 17th century - eastern view

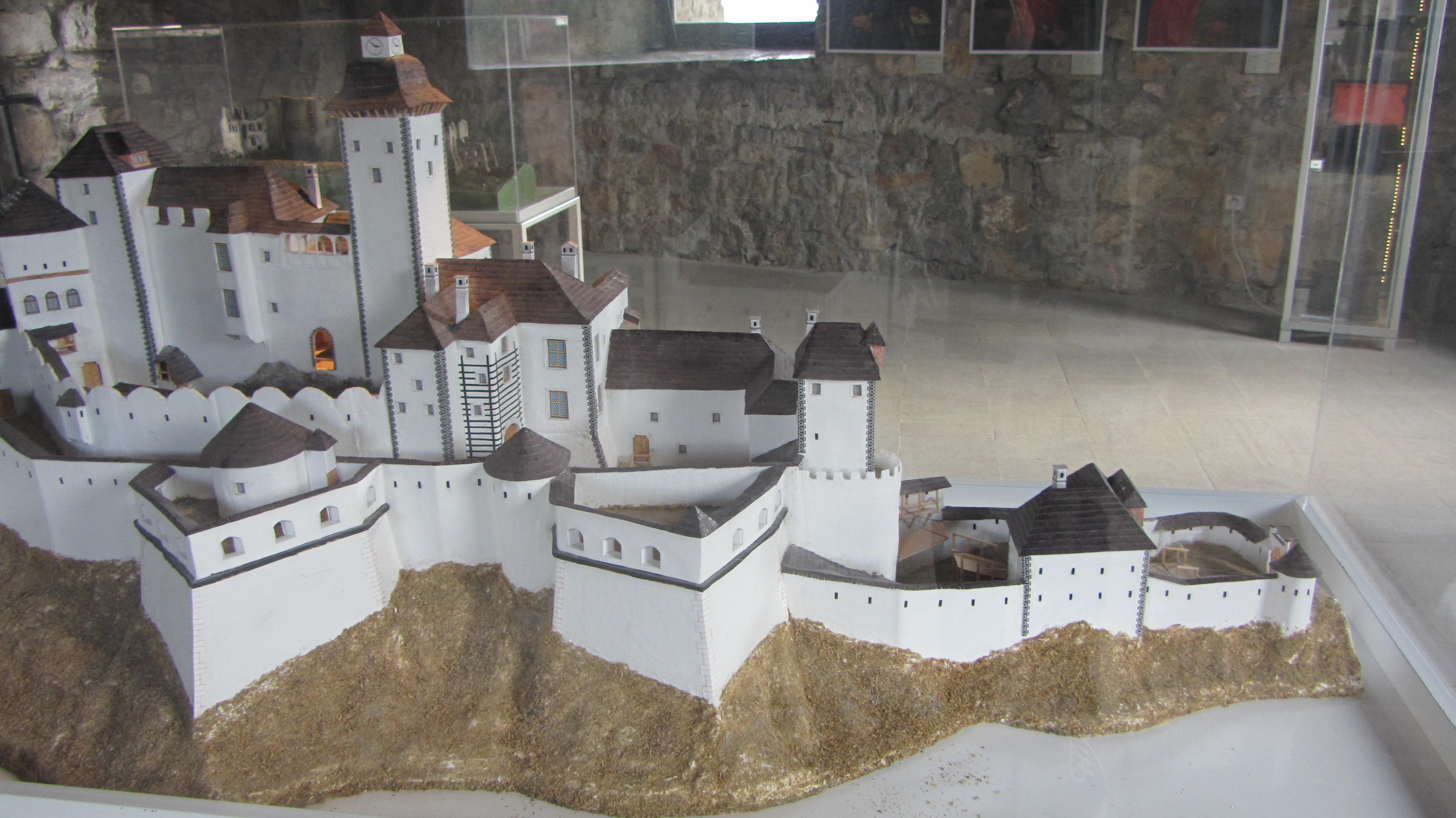
Assumed appearance of the castle at the end of the 17th century - western view

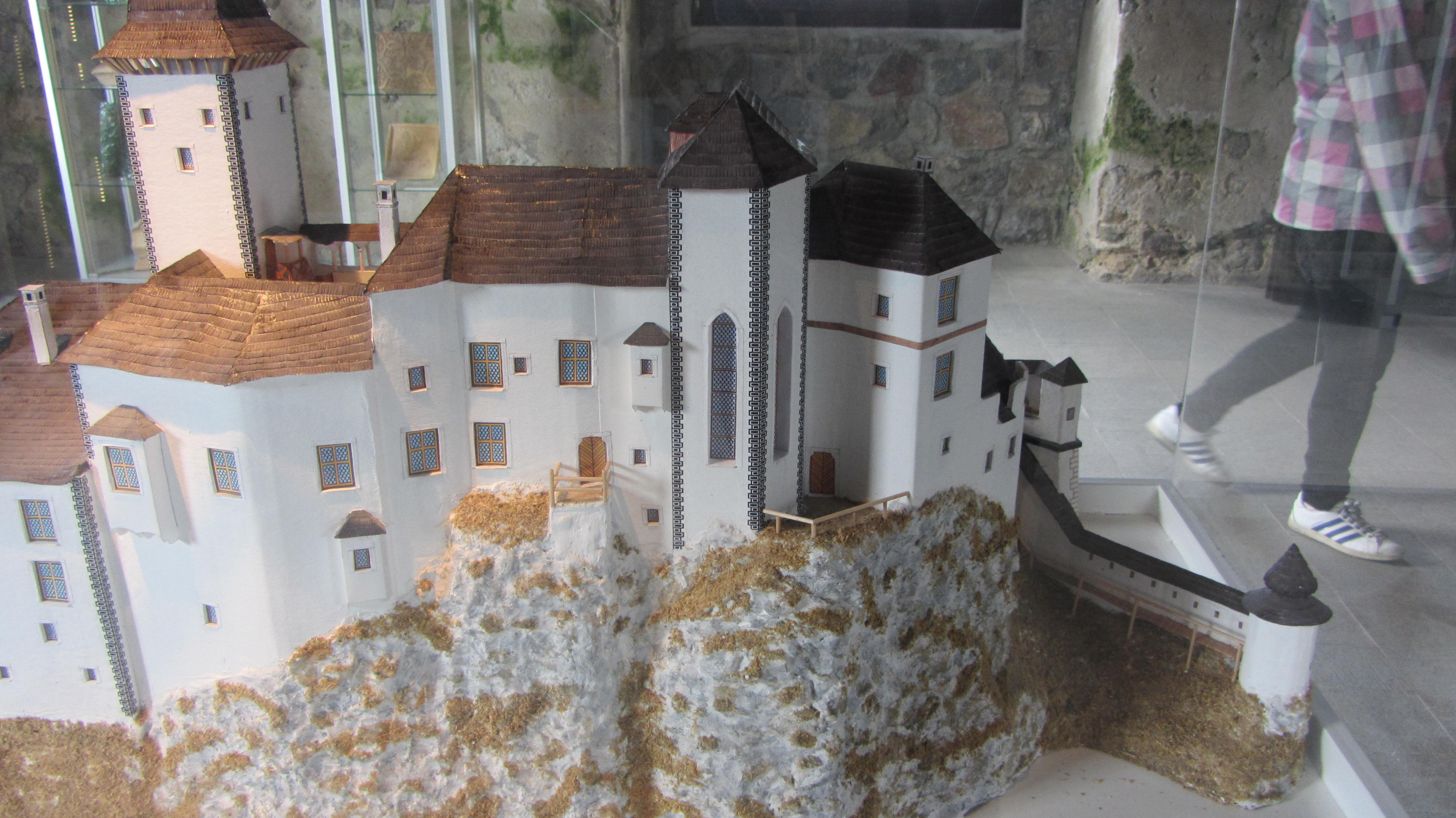
Assumed appearance of the castle at the end of the 17th century - the castle chapel with the north palace

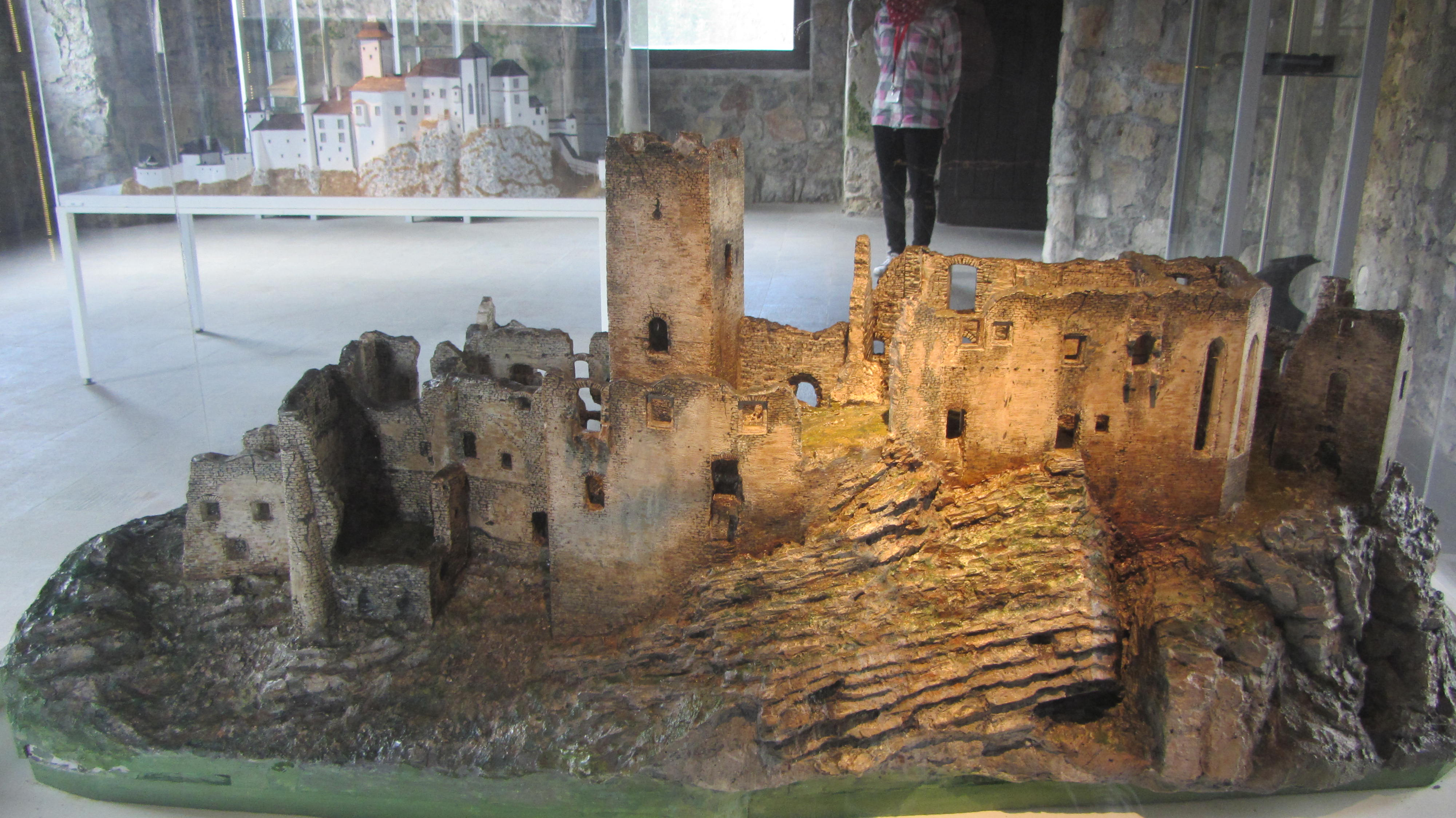
Appearance of the ruin of the castle before reconstruction - model

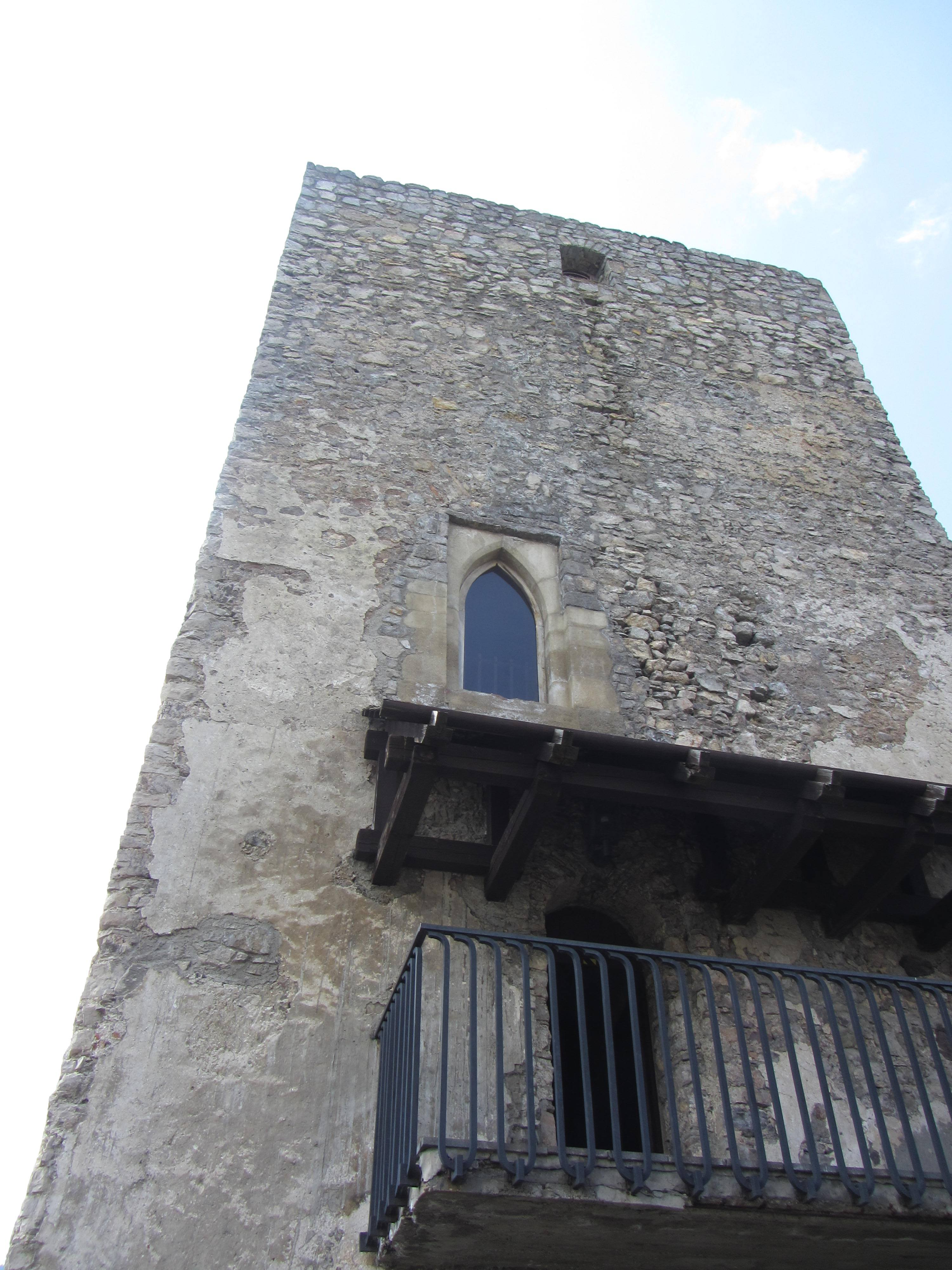
The main tower - northern facade

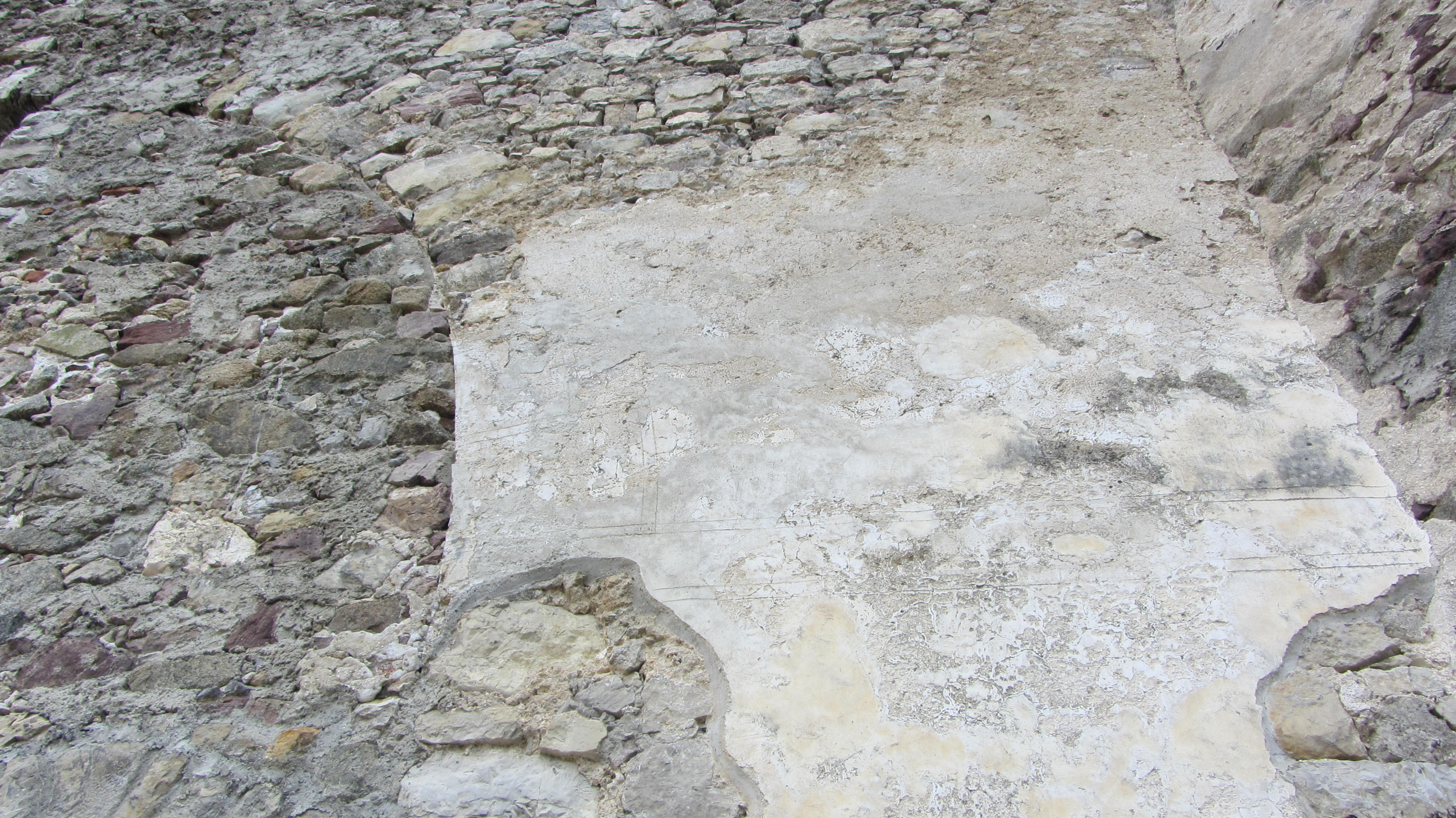
Partly preserved plaster on the recruit building

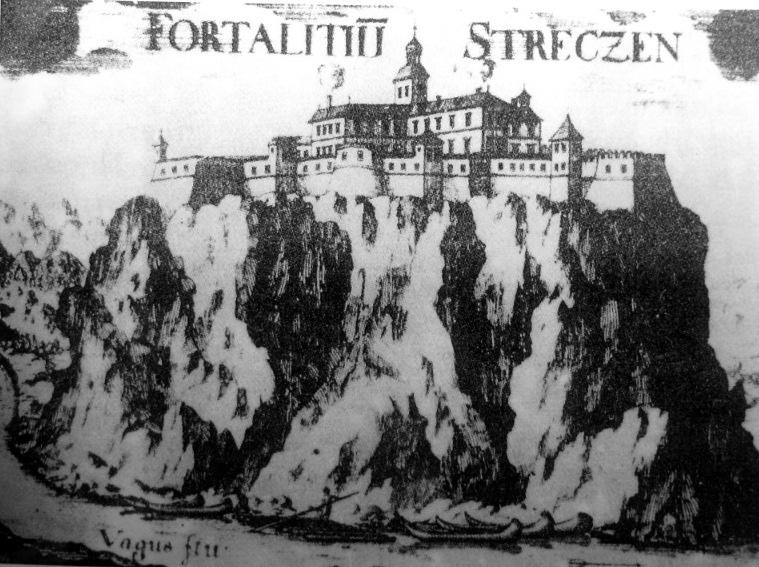
Strecno copperplate view from year 1680

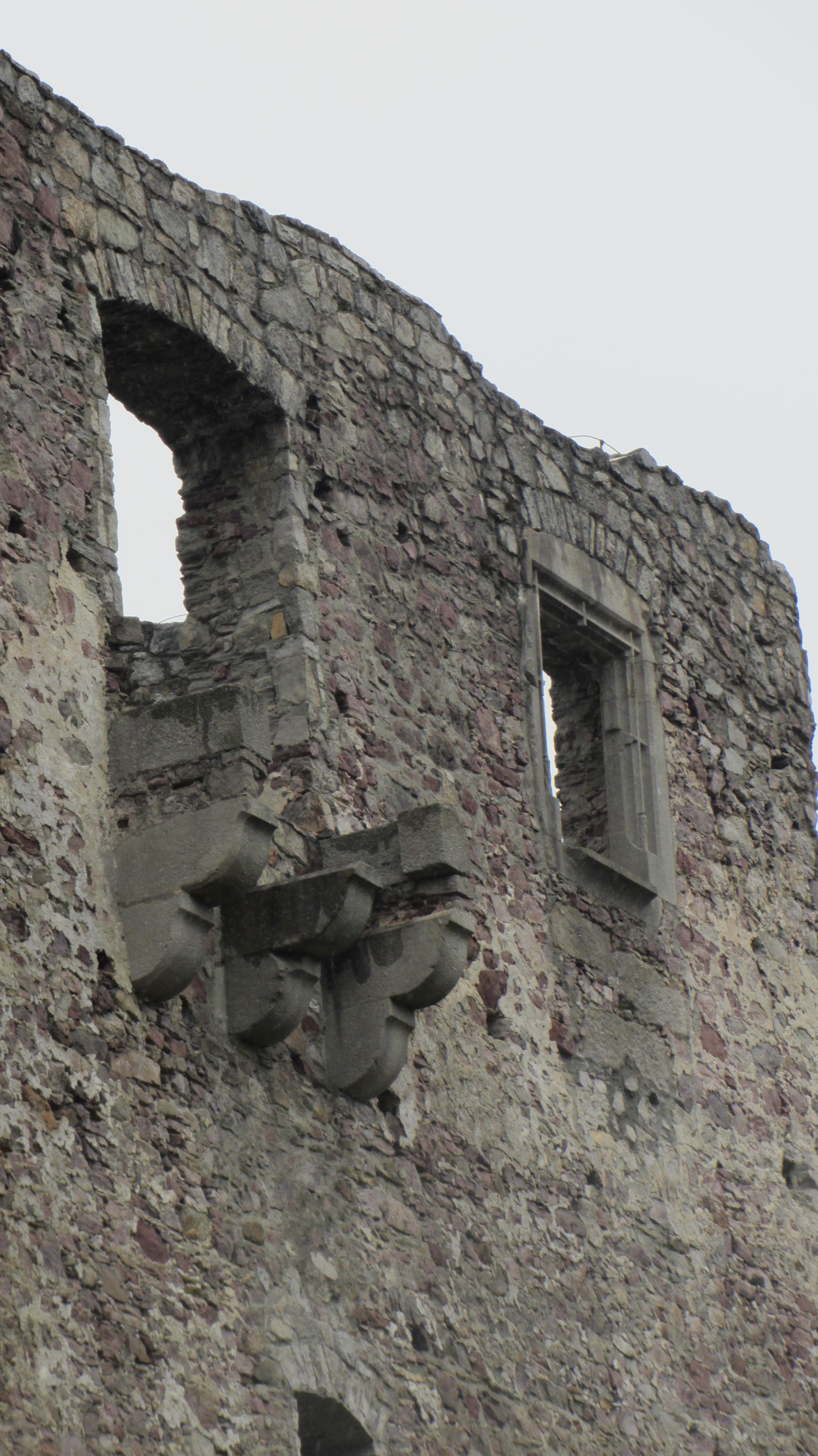
Relic of a bay window on the Western facade with 3 original consoles

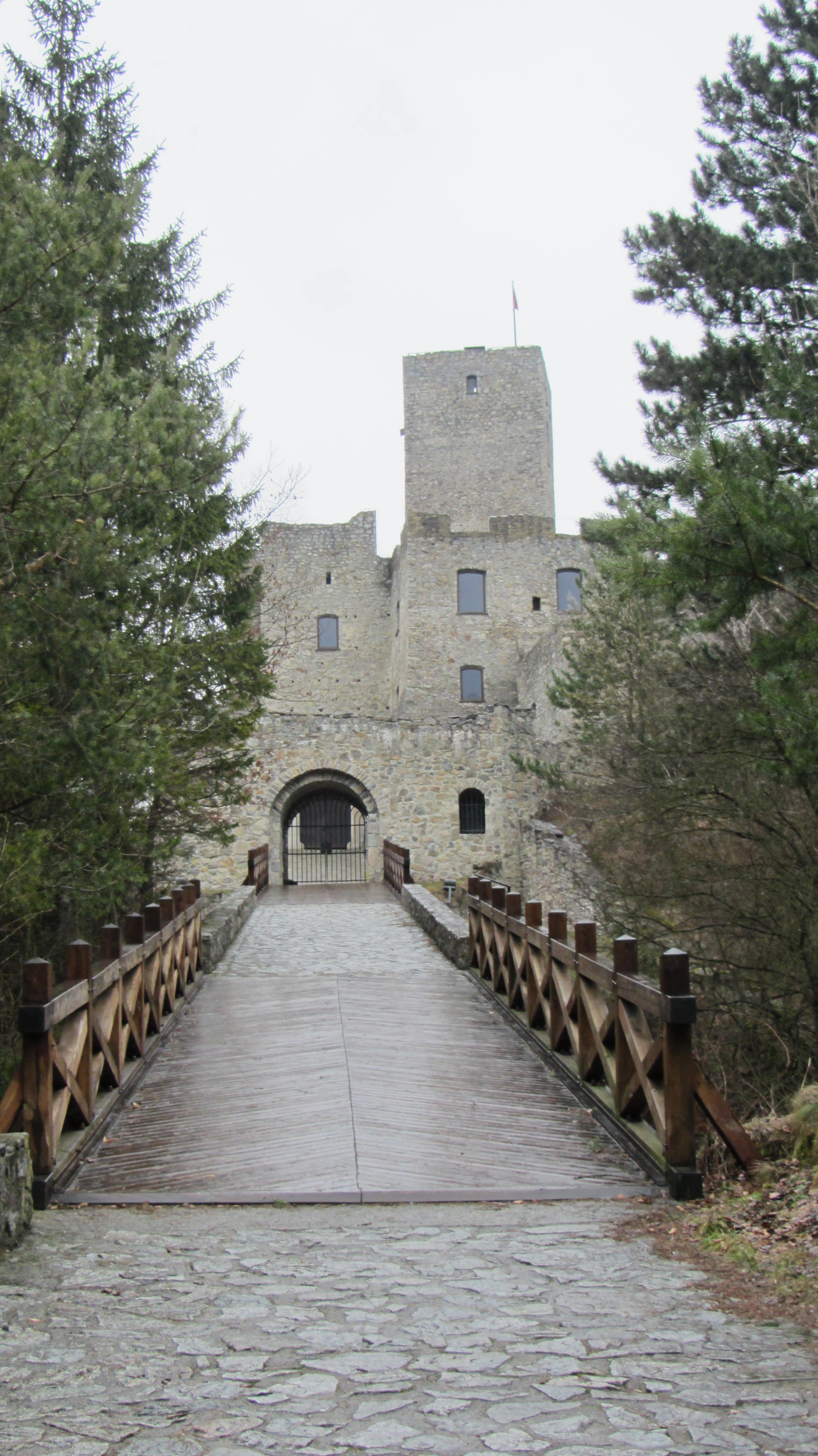
Main entrance to the castle through 2 bridges

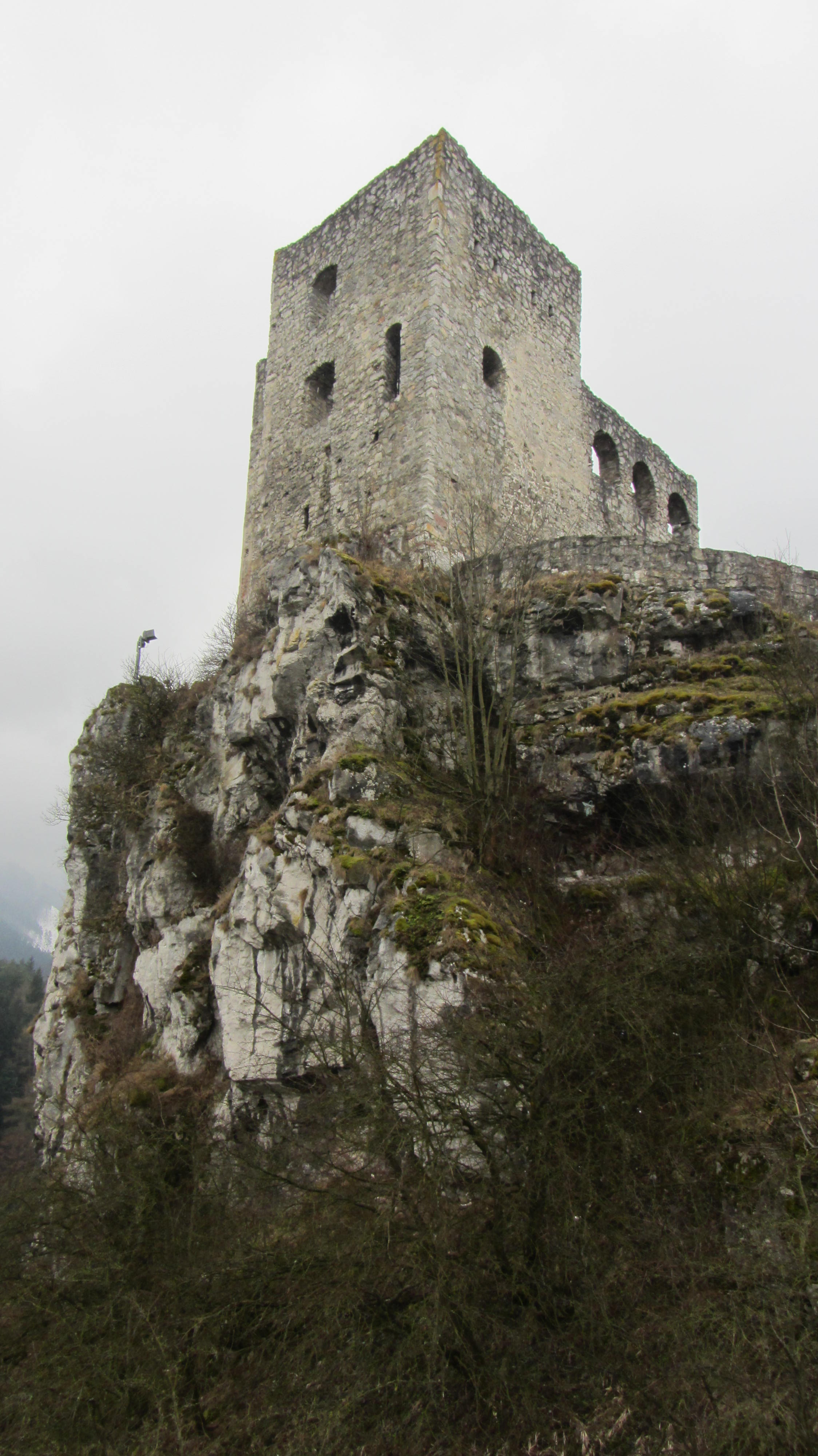
Northern tower with recruit building, view from rock massif.

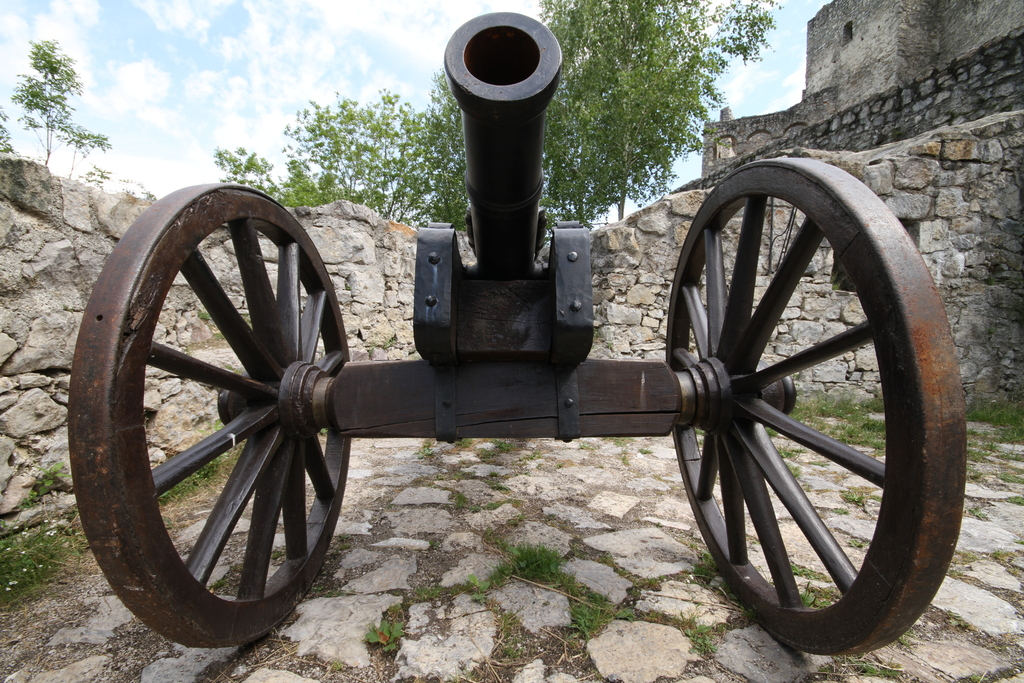
Light cannon

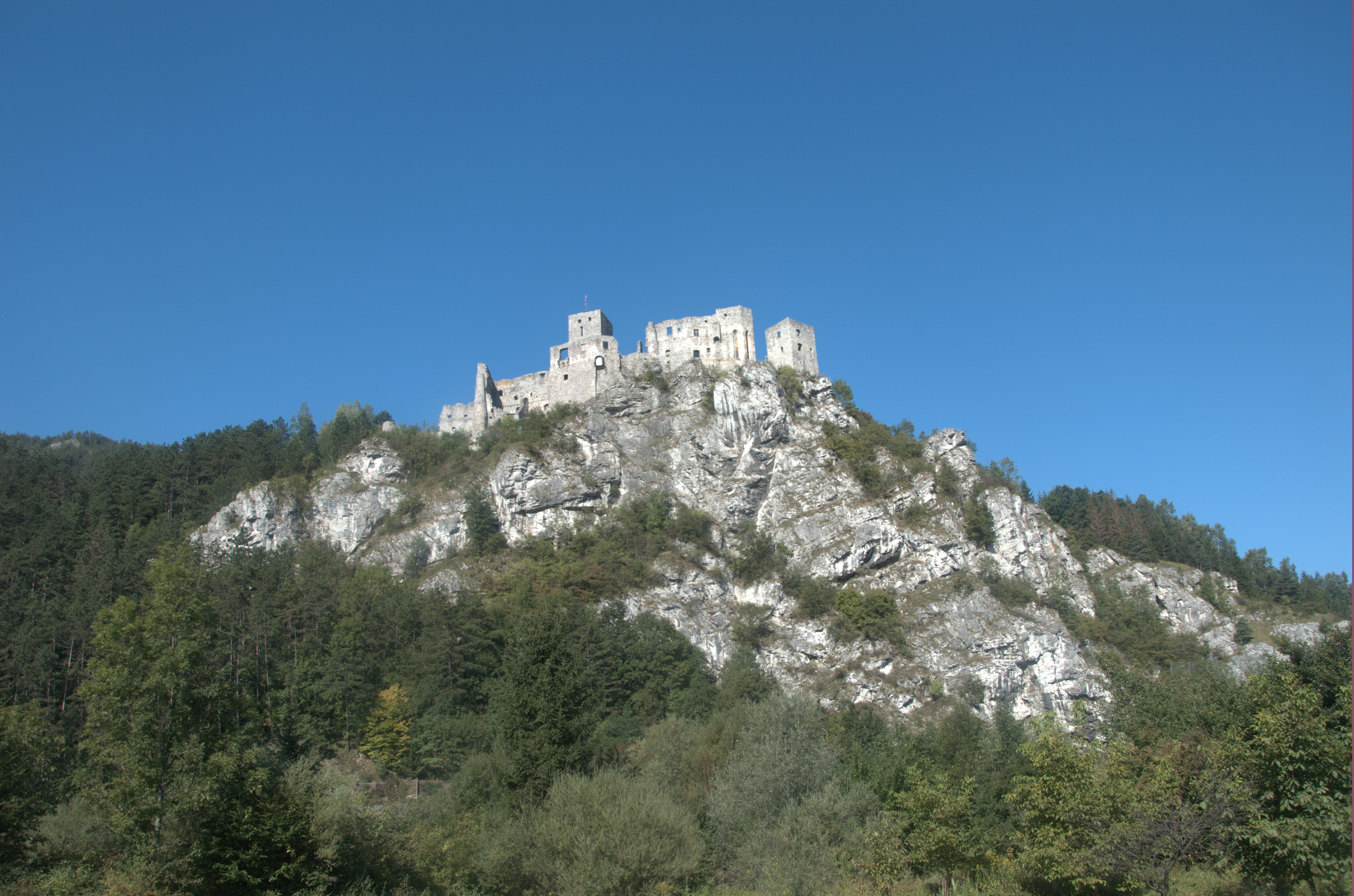
Strečno castle Slovakia Frontlook

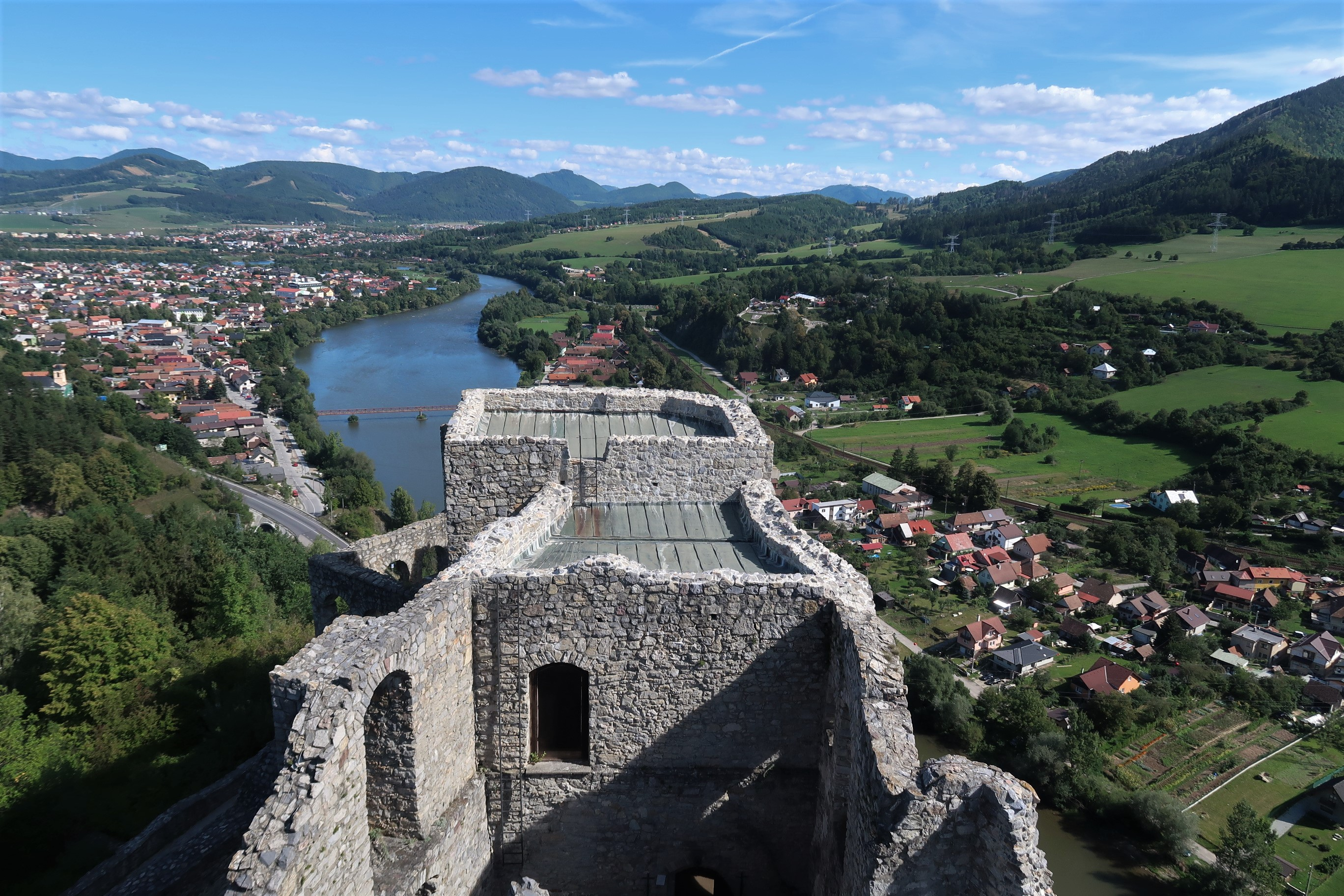
New built flat roof of the northern palace and chapel, view from the main tower.

== Bibliography ==
Považské múzeum Žilina, Hrad Strečno, AKKA 1994 ISBN 80-967176-0-X

BÓNA, Martin; PLAČEK, Miroslav. Encyklopedie slovenských hradů. Praha : Libri, 2007. ISBN 978-80-7277-333-6.

MAJERČÍKOVÁ, Danka. PUTOVANIE PO HRADOCH V OKOLÍ ŽILINY. Žilina : Žilinská knižnica, 2005

https://www.pamiatky.sk/

KOČIŠ, Jozef; Od Čachtíc po Strečno (1989), Martin: Osveta, 232 s. ISBN 80-217-0053-X

Martina Bernátová; Diplomová práca. Masarykova univerzita, Filozofická fakulta. Obnovený hrad Strečno – pendant Starého hradu – a jeho srovnání s památkově zajištěnými objekty
