= Anton Hám =

Slovak artist (1899–1965)

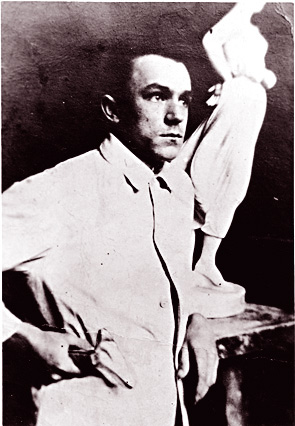
- Anton Hám
- Born: 20 April 1899; Kremnica, Slovakia
- Died: 23 November 1965 (aged 66); Kremnica, Slovakia
- Known for: Engraver and Medallist

Anton Hám (20 April 1899 – 23 November 1965) was a Slovak engraver and medallist. He was born and died in the town of Kremnica.

== Life ==
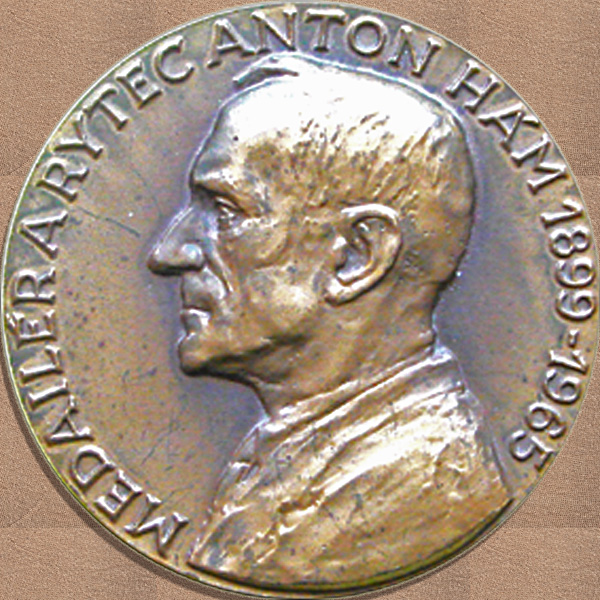
Medallist and Engraver Anton Hám by František David (portrait), Štefan Grosch (text)

Anton Hám came from the family with coin-minting and mining tradition. His father, Anton Hám Sr., was a coiner in the Kremnica Mint of the Austro-Hungarian Monarchy, one of the oldest mints along the Paris mint (Monnaie de Paris) and Rome mint. Continuing the family tradition, Anton Hám Jr. was preparing himself for an engraving profession. Due to his talent, he won a scholarship at the art college in Budapest where he studied in 1916–1919. During riots in the First World War, he returned home and worked as an engraver in the Kremnica Mint. On the Professor Otakar Španiel recommendation, he started his studies at the Academy of Fine Arts in Prague, specializing in medals (1922–1925). Despite he was among the best students, he had to soon complete his studies to overtake a leading position as a chief engraver in engraving department of the State Mint in Kremnica after deceased medalist Jan Čejka. Subsequently, he worked there for 46 years until his retirement.

In 1928, he married Jozefína Nemčeková from Kremnica and bought a villa located in a Kremnica's district called "Masarykova štvrť" where their son Milan was born. A big fruit orchard surrounding his house was a place where Anton Hám spent working all his leisure time.

Dedicating his life and work to the Kremnica Mint, Anton Hám became one of the most brilliant personalities building high prestige of the Mint.

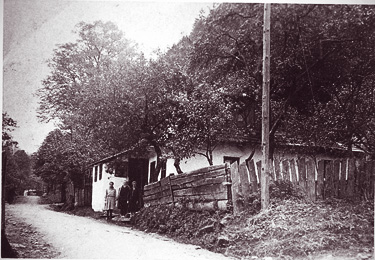
Anton Hám before his birthplace in the Valley Soler of Kremnica

== Work ==
As a student of the Academy of Fine Arts in Prague, Anton Hám made 1000 pieces of the numbered stamping dies for Czechoslovak ducats (1923). They were called St. Wenceslas ducats (svätováclavské dukáty), which were used as an official trade currency in Czechoslovakia. Nowadays, these gold coins belong to precious antiques. Later, Anton Hám produced the very first Czechoslovak hall-marks for gold and silver. He also worked as an author of medals, a sculptor and a specialist in coin fakes. Medals called Kremnica and Doná brána (1930) have been very popular in the past, as well as another piece called Oživenie kremnického baníctva (1934) struck in gold even repeatedly later. He is known as a co-author of all coins produced during the Slovak Republic (1939–45) and he co-designed Polish coins as 1 Polish zloty (1949), 50 and 20 groszy (1949).

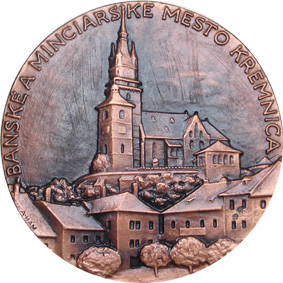
Kremnica plaketa

Anton Hám introduced in the Kremnica Mint enamelling of lapel pins and order (honour)-s that were very popular and have been produced for leading companies in the state. A large number of his pins have been focused on sports, religious, historical and agricultural themes. In 1937, he became acquainted with pantographs and the Janvier reduction machines for the medal art on his study stay in Paris, which then he introduced in the Kremnica Mint.

After the Second World War, he was regarded as the top researcher and constructor specialized in automation of the striking technology, mainly in techniques of cold striking, which were positively reviewed in abroad. This technology allowed minting a medal with a record diameter of 150 mm in an incredibly short period of five days beginning with a sketch and ending with the medal. That was the biggest world medal exhibited at Salon International de la Médaille 1949, in Paris. The annual report of the Kremnica Mint (2011) states that in 1948 the Mint was recognized at the world fair of medal manufacturers (FIDEM) in Paris for its medal with a diameter of 150 mm, which remained unsurpassed until the early 21st century.

== Coins of the Slovak Republic (1939–45) ==
Anton Hám co-authored the all coins produced in Slovak Republic (1939–45). Detailed information on these coins can be found in 2012 Standard Catalog of World Coins and the other cited literature.

- Coin of 5 Slovak haliers (1942)
- Coin of 10 Slovak haliers (1939, 1942)
- Coin of 20 Slovak haliers Cu (1940 – 42)
- Coin of 20 Slovak haliers Al (1942 – 43)
- Coin of 50 Slovak haliers Cu (1940 – 41)
- Coin of 50 Slovak haliers Al (1943 – 44)
- Coin of 1 Slovak koruna (1940 – 42, 44, 45)
- Coin of 5 Slovak korunas (1939)
- Coin of 20 Slovak korunas (1939)
- Coin of 50 Slovak korunas (1939)
