= Bohemian and Moravian koruna =

Currency during World War II

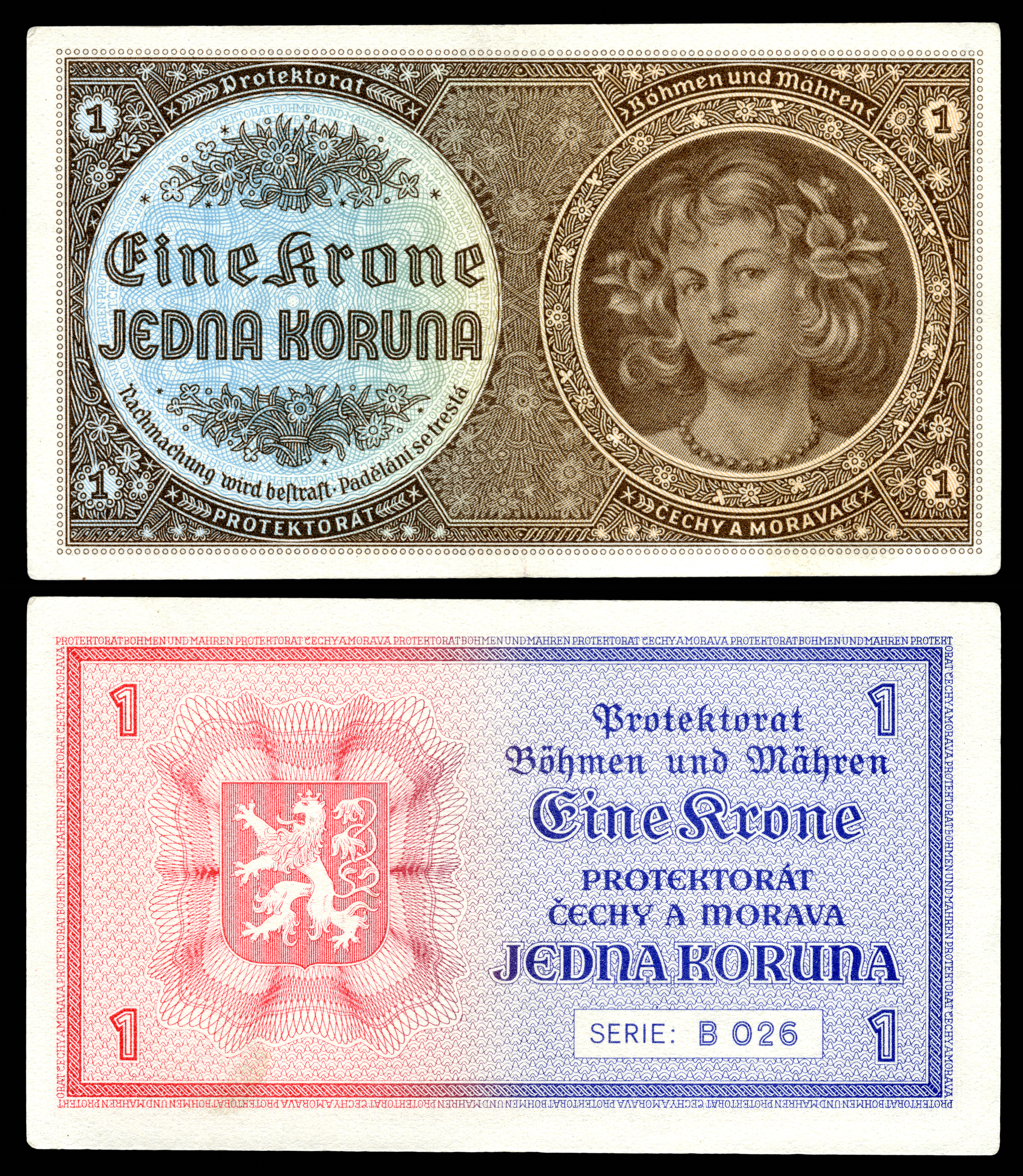
- A one koruna 1940 note

Unit
- Plural: Kronen (German); The language(s) of this currency belong(s) to the Slavic languages. There is more than one way to construct plural forms.
- Symbol: K

Denominations
- Subunit
- 1/100: haléř (Czech); Heller (German)
- Plural
- haléř (Czech) Heller (German): Heller (German)
- Symbol
- haléř (Czech) Heller (German): h
- Banknotes: 1, 5, 10, 20, 50, 100, 500, 1000, 5000 korun
- Coins: 10, 20, 50 haléřů, 1 koruna

Demographics
- User(s): Protectorate of Bohemia and Moravia
- This infobox shows the latest status before this currency was rendered obsolete.

The Bohemian and Moravian koruna, known as the Protectorate crown (Czech: Protektorátní koruna; German: Krone des Protektorats), was the currency of the Protectorate of Bohemia and Moravia between 1939 and 1945. It was subdivided into 100 haléřů.

== History ==
The Bohemian and Moravian koruna replaced the Czechoslovak koruna at par and was replaced by the reconstituted Czechoslovak koruna, again at par. It was pegged to the Reichsmark at a rate of 1 Reichsmark = 10 koruna and was initially equal in value to the Slovak koruna, although this currency was devalued in 1940.

== Coins ==
In 1940, zinc 10, 20 and 50 haléřů coins were introduced, followed by 1 koruna in 1941. The coins were minted until 1944. The reverse designs were very similar to the earlier Czechoslovak coins. The coins were emergency issue types, similar to the coins of other German-occupied territories.

Value	Mintage	Image	Notes
10 haléřů	82,114,000 (1940)		Mass: 1.88; Diameter: 17; Edge: Plain; Composition: 100% Zinc; Obverse design: Czech lion Lettering:Böhmen und Mahren ČECHY A MORAVA 1940; Reverse design: Denomination and Charles Bridge; Lettering:10
20 haléřů	106,526,000 (1940)		Mass: 2.63; Diameter: 20; Thickness: 1.25; Edge: Plain; Composition: 100% Zinc; Obverse design:Czech lion Lettering: Böhmen und Mahren ČECHY A MORAVA 1940; Reverse design: Denomination with wheat ears and sickle Lettering: 20
50 haléřů	53,270,000 (1940)		Mass: 3.7; Diameter: 22; Edge: Milled; Composition: 100% Zinc; Obverse design: Czech lion Lettering: Böhmen und Mahren ČECHY A MORAVA 1940; Reverse design: Denomination with linden branches and wheat ears below Lettering: 50
1 koruna	102,817,000 (1941)		Mass: 4.5; Diameter: 23; Thickness: 2 Edge: Milled; Composition: 100% zinc Obverse design: Czech lion Lettering: BÖHMEN UND MAHREN ČECHY A MORAVA; Reverse design: Denomination with linden branches Lettering: 1 1941

== Banknotes ==
Czechoslovak banknotes for 1 koruna and 5 korun were stamped (and later printed) with "Protektorat Böhmen und Mähren" over "Protektorát Čechy a Morava," and subsequently issued in Bohemia and Moravia beginning on February 9, 1940. These were followed by regular government issues of 1, 5, 50 and 100 korun in 1940, 10 korun in 1942, and 20 and 50 korun in 1944. Nationalbank für Böhmen und Mähren in Prag (National Bank for Bohemia and Moravia in Prague) introduced 500 and 100 korun notes in 1942, followed in 1943 by overprinted Czechoslovak 5000 korun notes. In 1944, the National Bank issued regular 5000 korun notes.

The Nationalbank für Böhmen und Mähren in Prag (National Bank for Bohemia and Moravia in Prague) issues were signed by:

- Hanuš Ringhoffer as Bankrat / Bankovní Rada (Bank Council)
- Ladislav F. Dvořák as Gouverneur / Guvernér (Governor)
- František Peroutka as Oberdirektor / Vrchní Ředitel (Chief Director)

Period	Issue	Value	Date	Image	Size	Comments
Protectorate; Bohemia and Moravia	1939 Provisional Issue	1 Koruna	ND (1940)		105 x 59 mm	Overprint available as a handstamp (09 Feb 1940) or as a machine stamp (31 May 1940)
Protectorate; Bohemia and Moravia	1939 Provisional Issue	5 Korun	ND (1940)		130 x 63 mm	Josef Jungmann. Overprint available as a handstamp (09 Feb 1940) or as a machine stamp (31 May 1940)
Protectorate; Bohemia and Moravia	1940 Issue	1 Koruna	ND (10 Apr 1940)		105 x 59 mm	Series A - D = printed by Banknotendruckerei der Nationalbank für Böhmen und Mähren Series H = printed by Haase
Protectorate; Bohemia and Moravia	1940 Issue	5 Korun	ND (27 Mar 1940)		130 x 63 mm	Series A, B = printed by Banknotendruckerei der Nationalbank für Böhmen und Mähren Series G = printed by Česká grafická unie Series H = printed by Haase Series P = printed by Otto a Růžicčka
Protectorate; Bohemia and Moravia	1940 Issue	50 Korun	12 Sep 1940		177 x 75 mm	Printed by Banknotendruckerei der Nationalbank für Böhmen und Mähren
Protectorate; Bohemia and Moravia	1940 Issue	100 Korun	20 Aug 1940		170 x 83 mm	Prague Castle & Charles Bridge Available with and without "II. AUFLAGE-II. VYDANI" (second issue) in left border on back. First issue all printed by Banknotendruckerei der Nationalbank für Böhmen und Mähren Second issue without lower case "b" in Series was also printed by BNBM. With a lower case "b" was printed by Česká grafická unie
Protectorate; Bohemia and Moravia	1942–44 Issue	10 Korun	08 Jul 1942		150 x 69 mm	All Series without a lower case "b" were printed by Banknotendruckerei der Nationalbank für Böhmen und Mähren Series with a lower case "b" were printed by Václav Neubert a synové
Protectorate; Bohemia and Moravia	1942–44 Issue	20 Korun	24 Jan 1944		157 x 72 mm	Series A = printed by Banknotendruckerei der Nationalbank für Böhmen und Mähren Series G, H = printed by Česká grafická unie
Protectorate; Bohemia and Moravia	1942–44 Issue	50 Korun	25 Sep 1944		165 x 75 mm	All notes printed by Banknotendruckerei der Nationalbank für Böhmen und Mähren
National Bank for Bohemia and Moravia	1942–44 Issue	500 Korun	24 Feb 1942		197 x 85 mm	Petr Brandl Available with and without "II. AUFLAGE-II. VYDANI" (second issue) in left border on back. Both issues were printed by Banknotendruckerei der Nationalbank für Böhmen und Mähren
National Bank for Bohemia and Moravia	1942–44 Issue	1,000 Korun	24 Oct 1942		200 x 95 mm	Peter Parler Available with and without "II. AUFLAGE-II. VYDANI" (second issue) in left border on back. Both issues printed by Banknotendruckerei der Nationalbank für Böhmen und Mähren. There two guilloche varieties in the second issue; a blue and tan version and a blue, tan, purple, and green version. The more colorful version has a series ending in a lower case "b", while the less colorful version has a series ending in a lower case "c".
National Bank for Bohemia and Moravia	1942–44 Issue	5,000 Korun	25 Oct 1943		203 x 112 mm	Overprint on a 1920 Czech note - Specimens only Printed by the American Bank Note Company
National Bank for Bohemia and Moravia	1942–44 Issue	5,000 Korun	24 Feb 1944		190 x 90 mm	St. Wenceslas Printed by Banknotendruckerei der Nationalbank für Böhmen und Mähren

== See also ==
- Czechoslovak koruna
- Czech koruna
- Slovak koruna
