= Pictorial list of postage stamps in Nazi Germany =

Postage stamps

== Postage stamps in Nazi Germany ==
=== 1939 ===
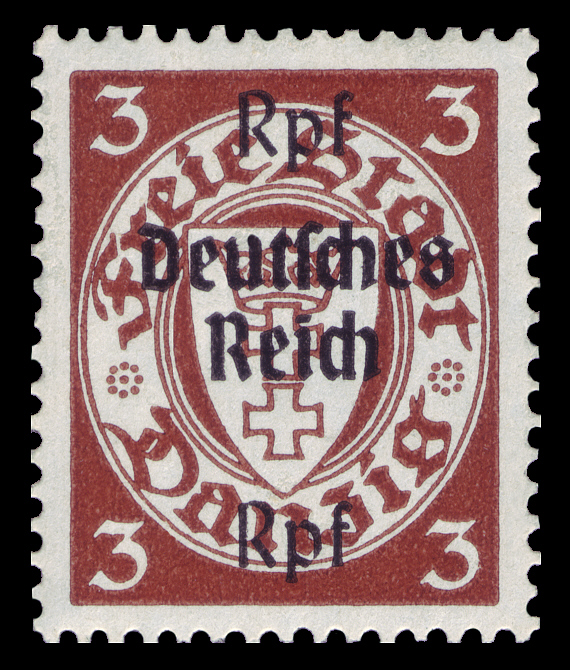
Danzig - Aufdruck
MiNr. 716 (289)

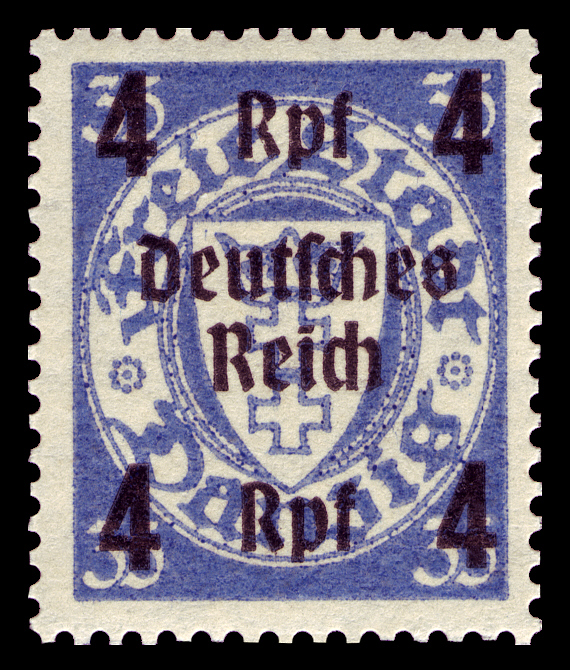
Danzig - Aufdruck
MiNr. 717 (215)

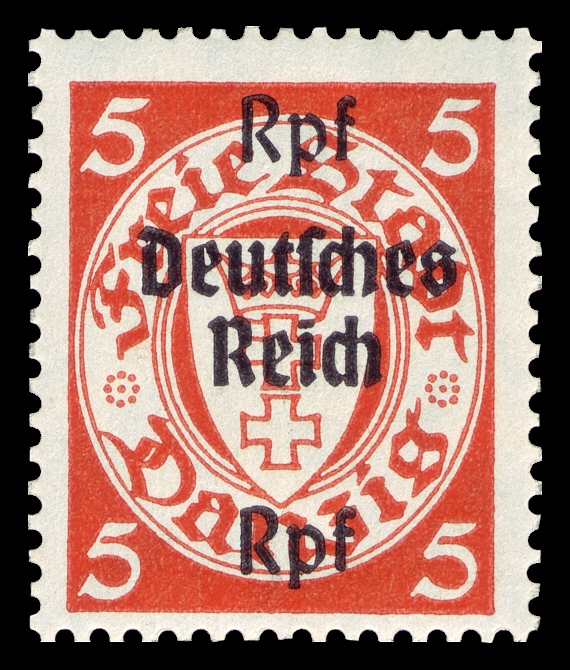
Danzig - Aufdruck
MiNr. 718 (290)

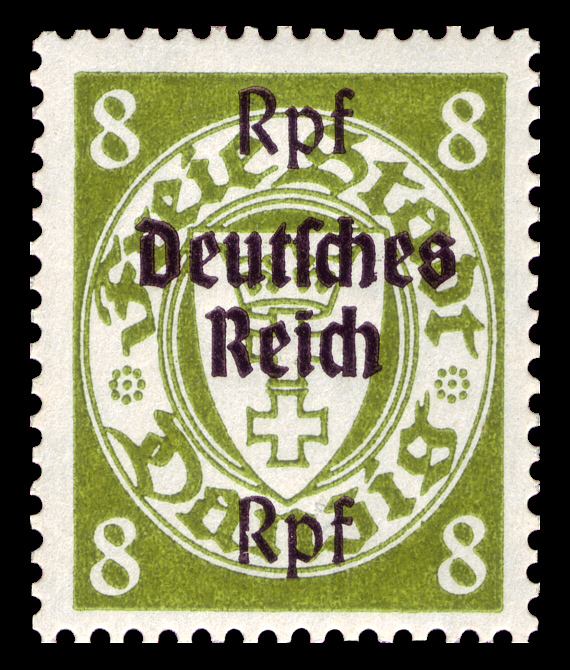
Danzig - Aufdruck
MiNr. 719 (291)

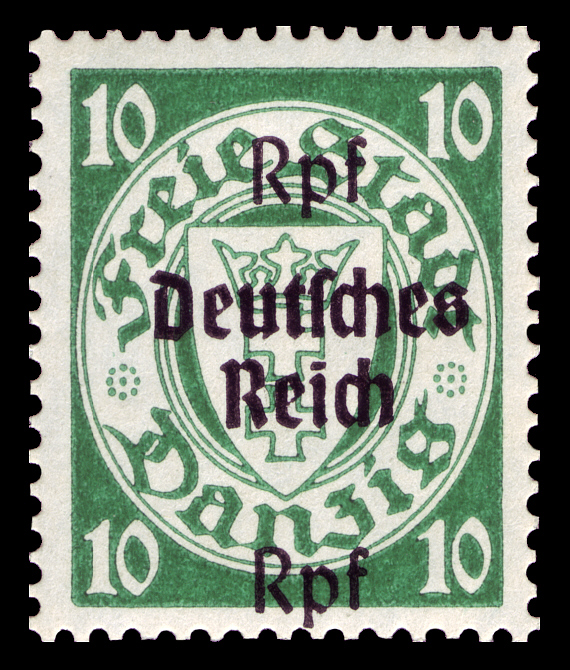
Danzig - Aufdruck
MiNr. 720 (292)

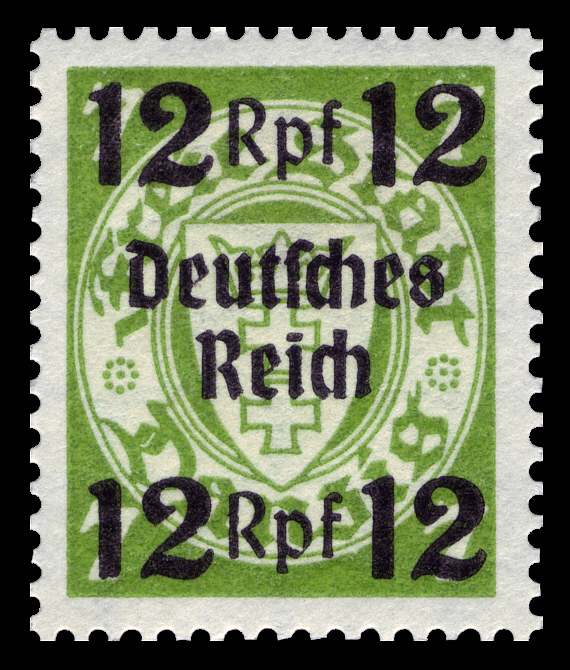
Danzig - Aufdruck
MiNr. 721 (236)

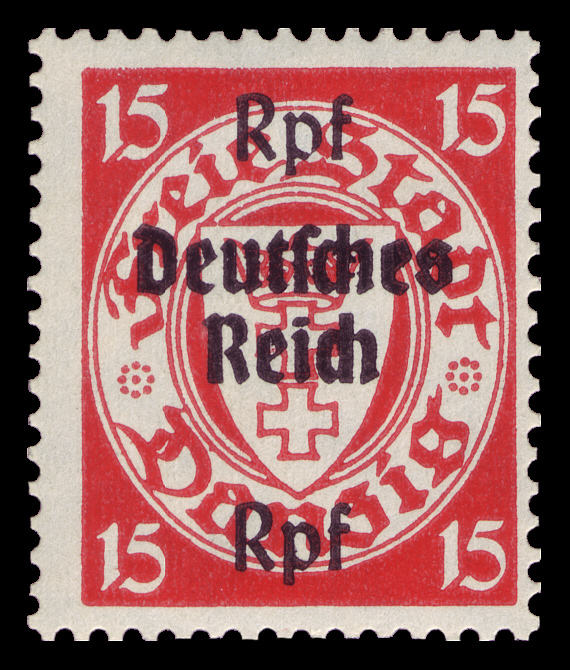
Danzig - Aufdruck
MiNr. 722 (293)

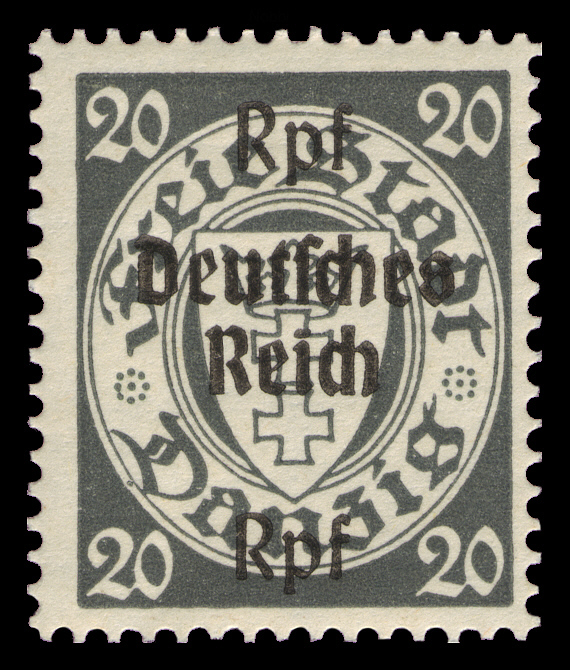
Danzig - Aufdruck
MiNr. 723 (245)

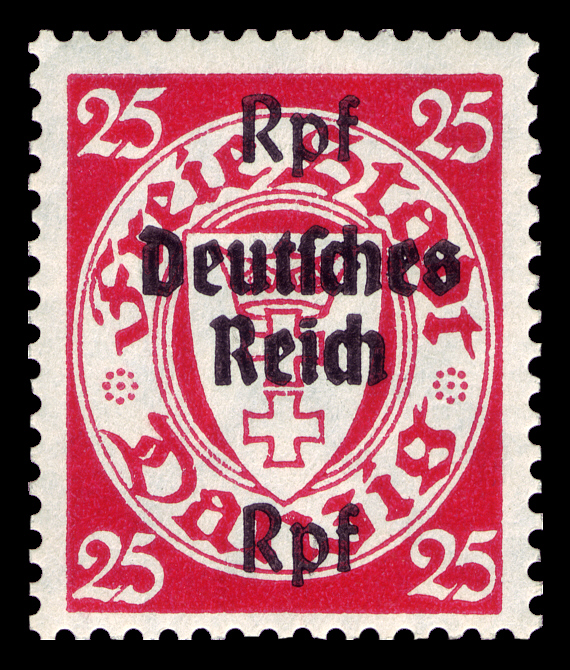
Danzig - Aufdruck
MiNr. 724 (294)

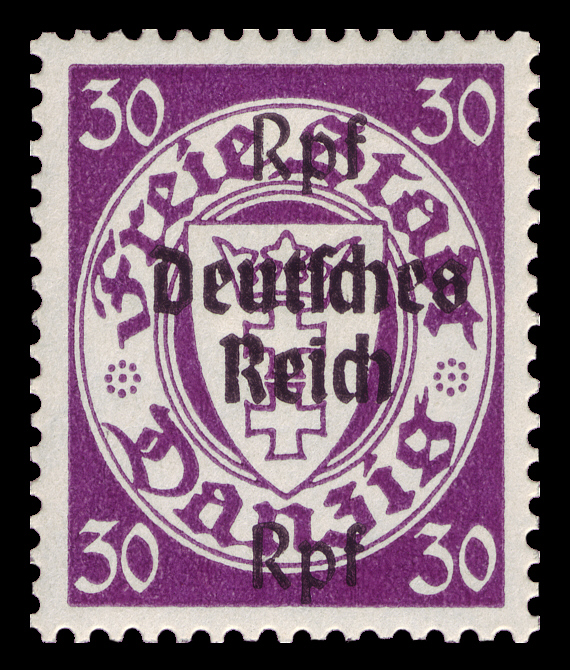
Danzig - Aufdruck
MiNr. 725

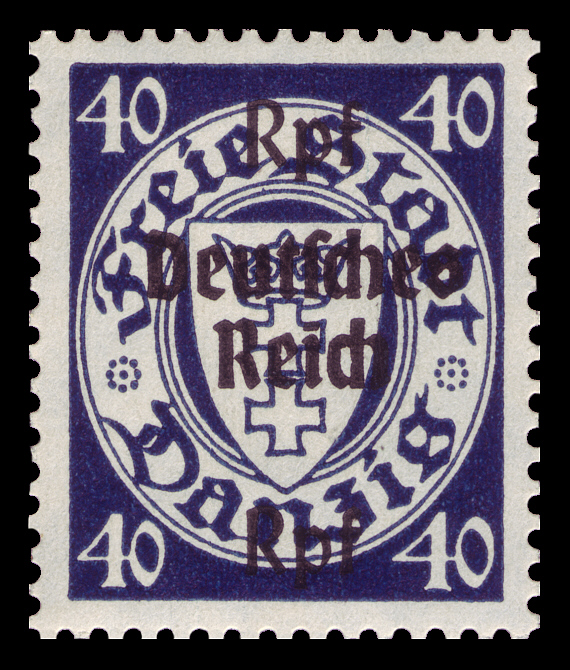
Danzig - Aufdruck
MiNr. 726 (295)

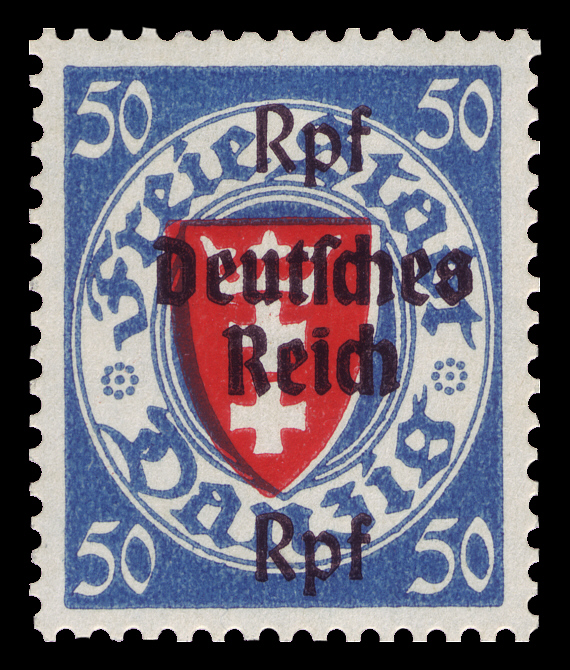
Danzig - Aufdruck
MiNr. 727 (296)

=== 1943 ===
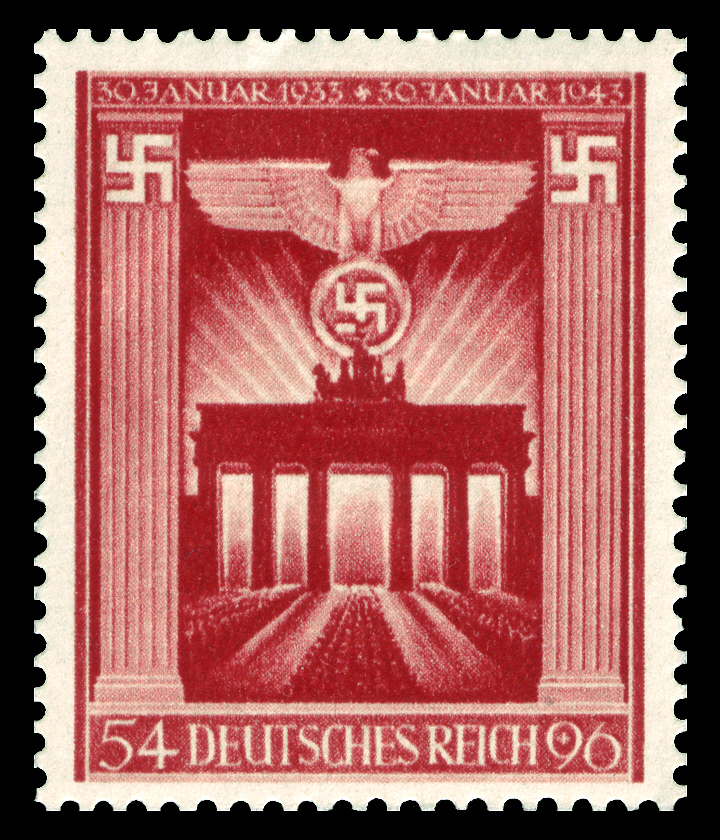
Brandenburger Tor
MiNr. 829

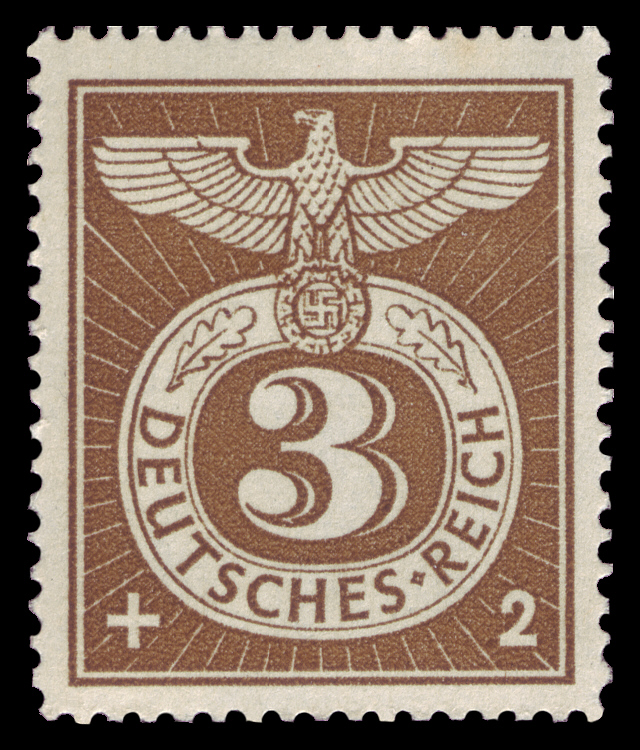
Sonderstempel
MiNr. 830

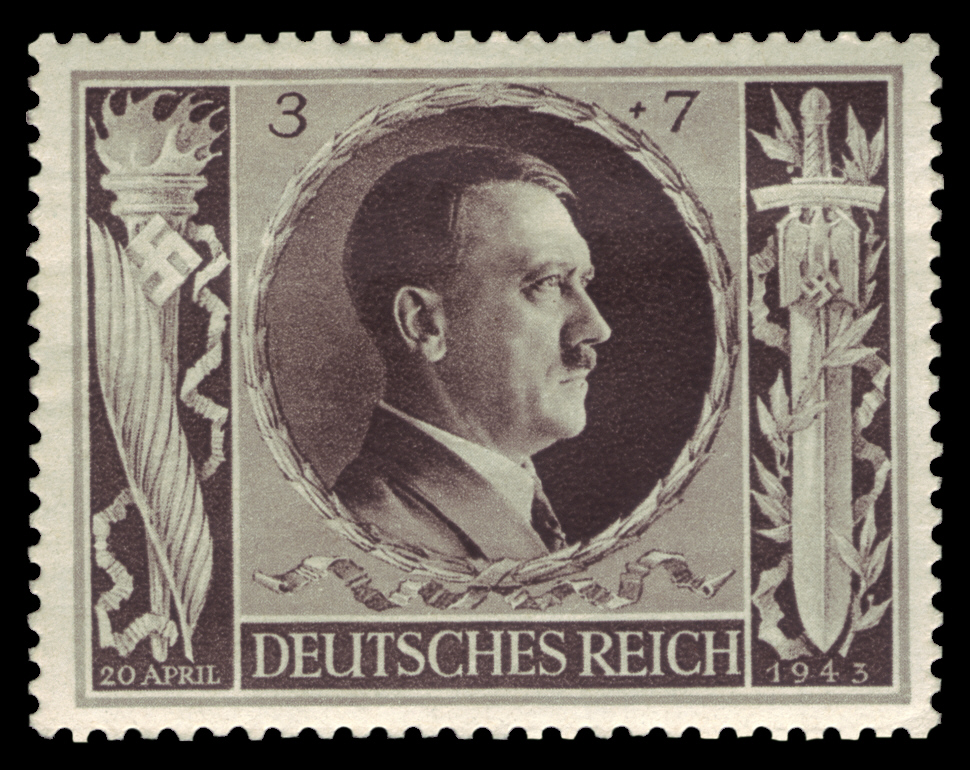
Adolf Hitler
MiNr. 844

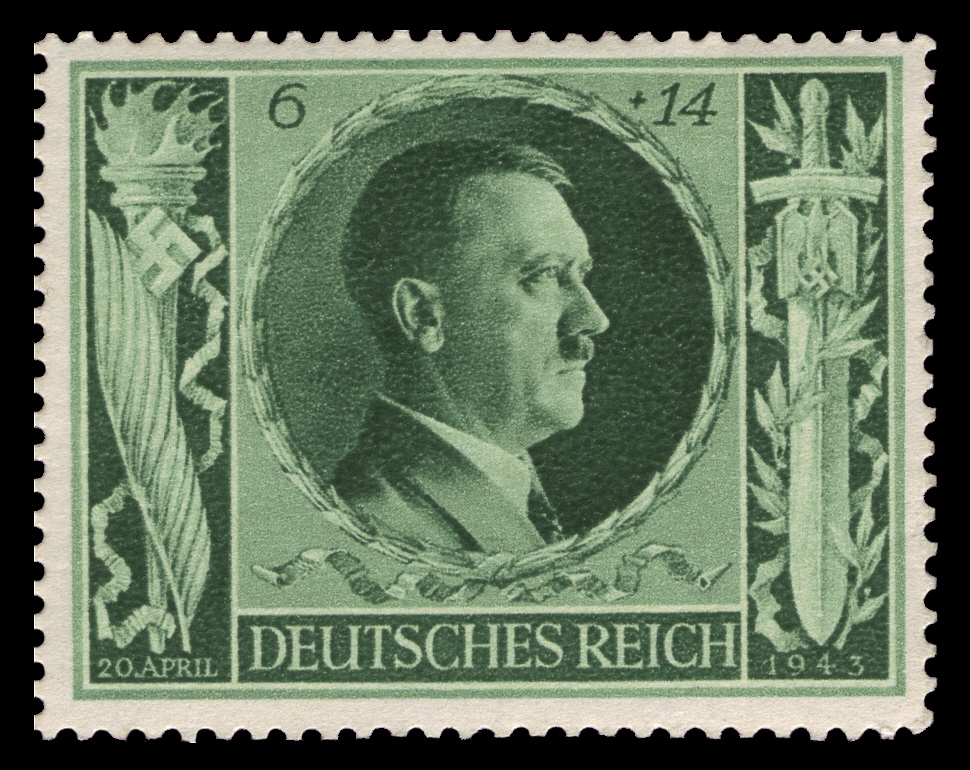
Adolf Hitler
MiNr. 845

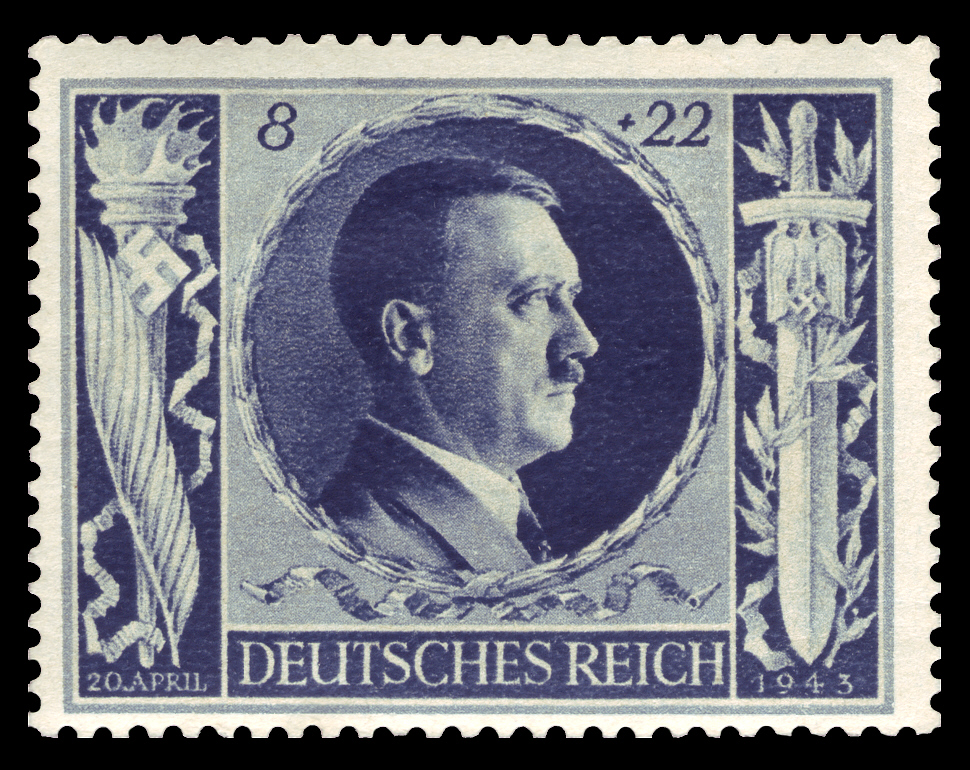
Adolf Hitler
MiNr. 846

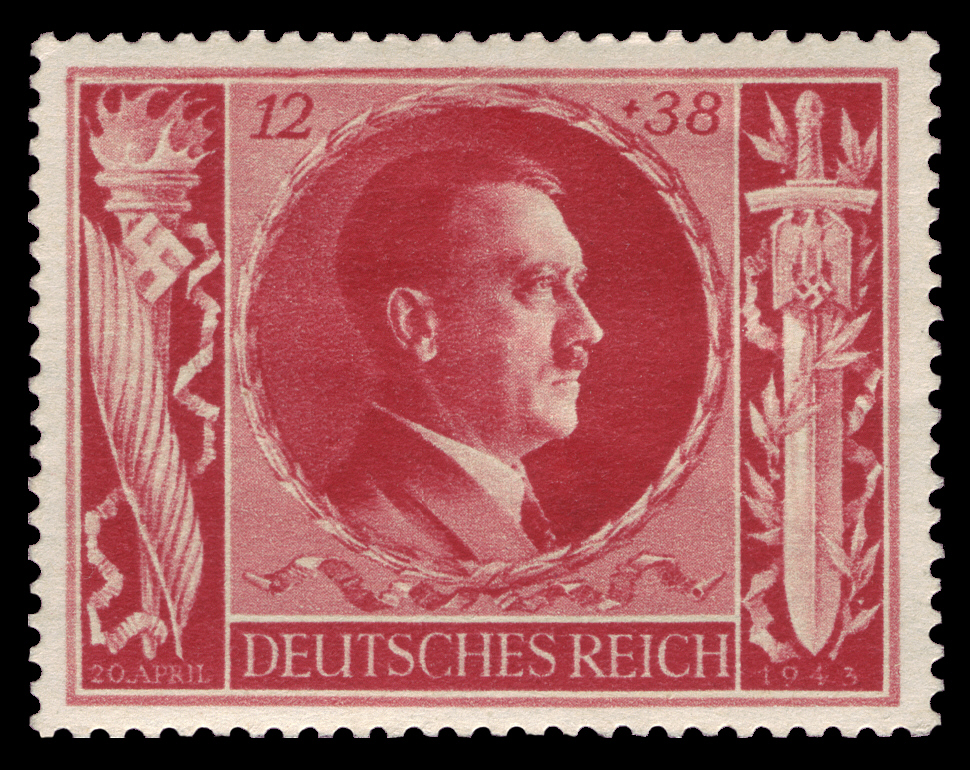
Adolf Hitler
MiNr. 847

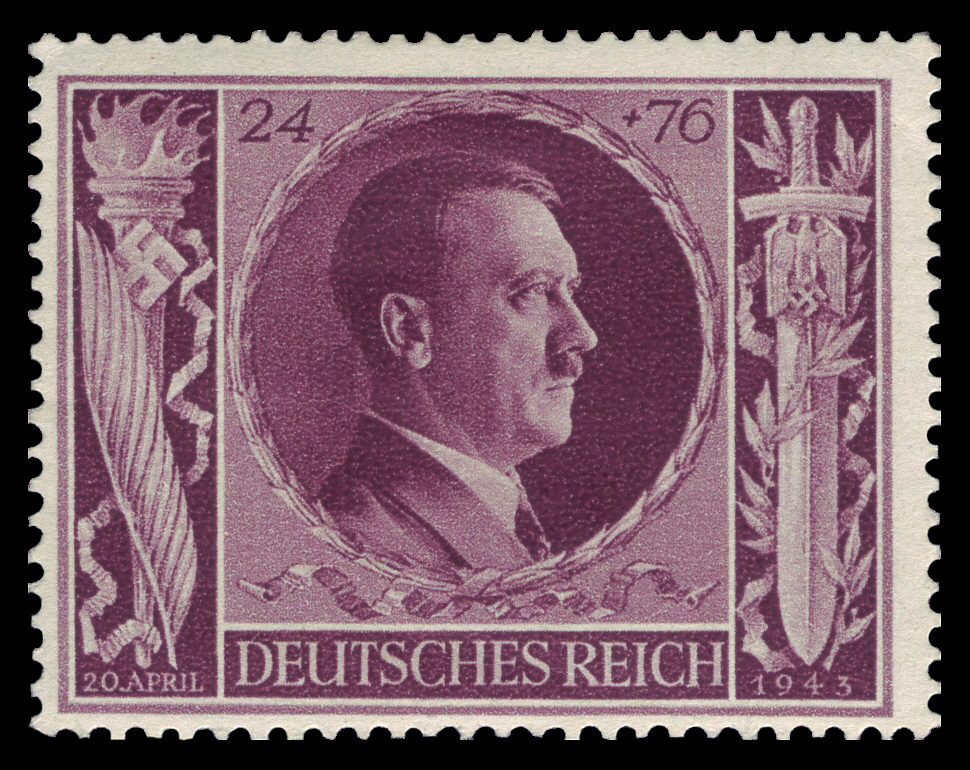
Adolf Hitler
MiNr. 848

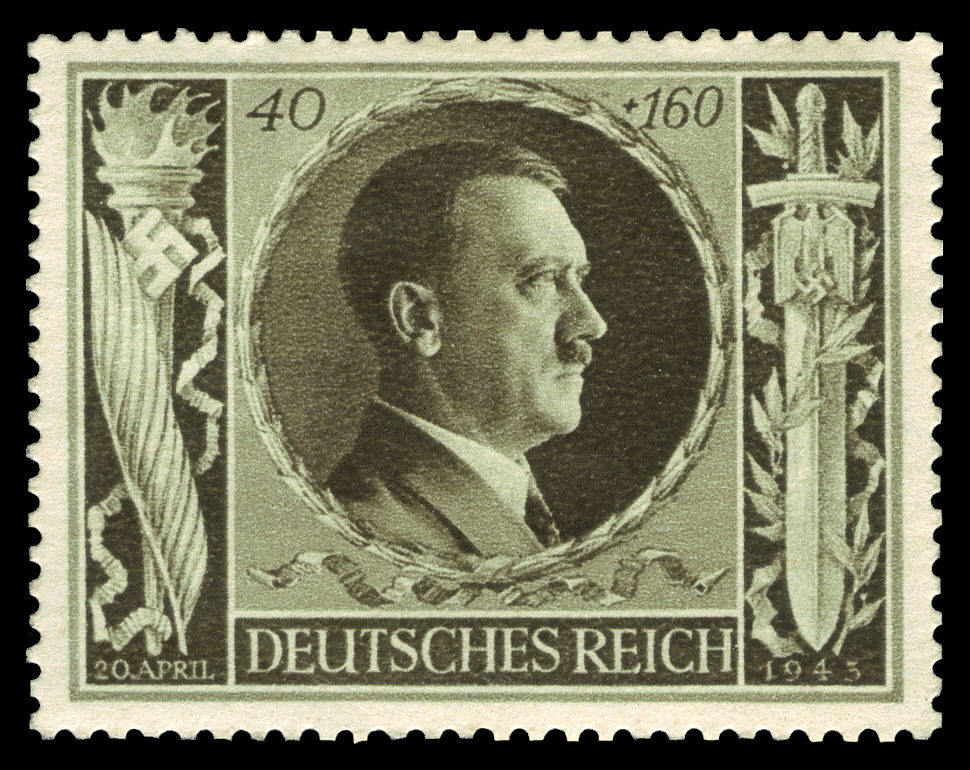
Adolf Hitler
MiNr. 849

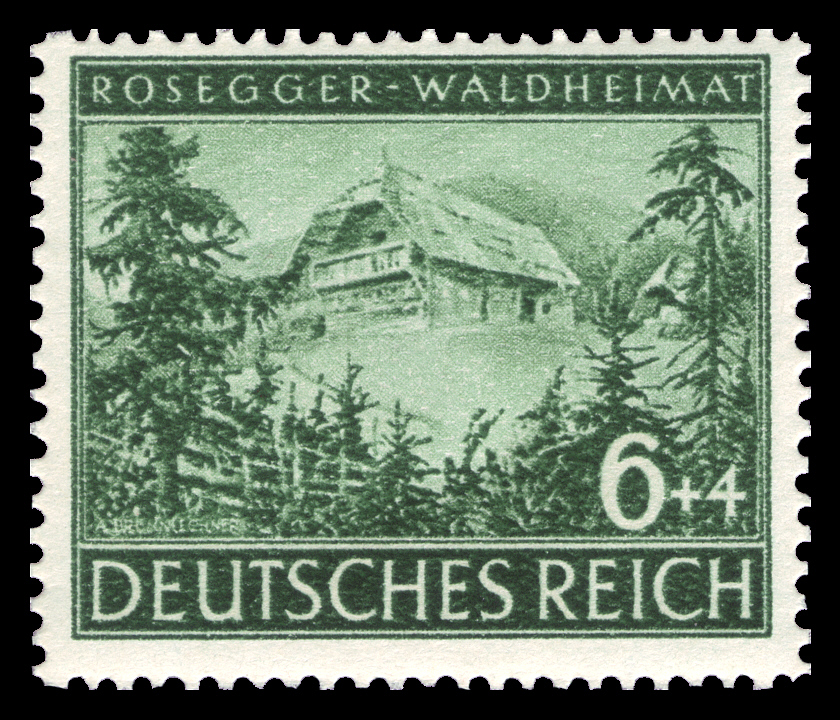
Geburtshaus von Peter Rosegger
MiNr. 855

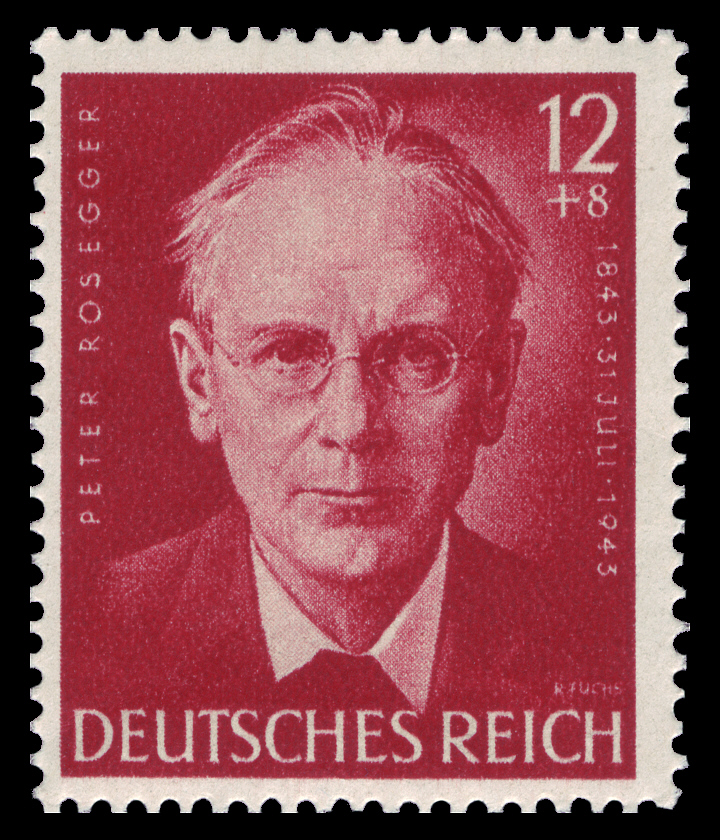
Peter Rosegger
MiNr. 856

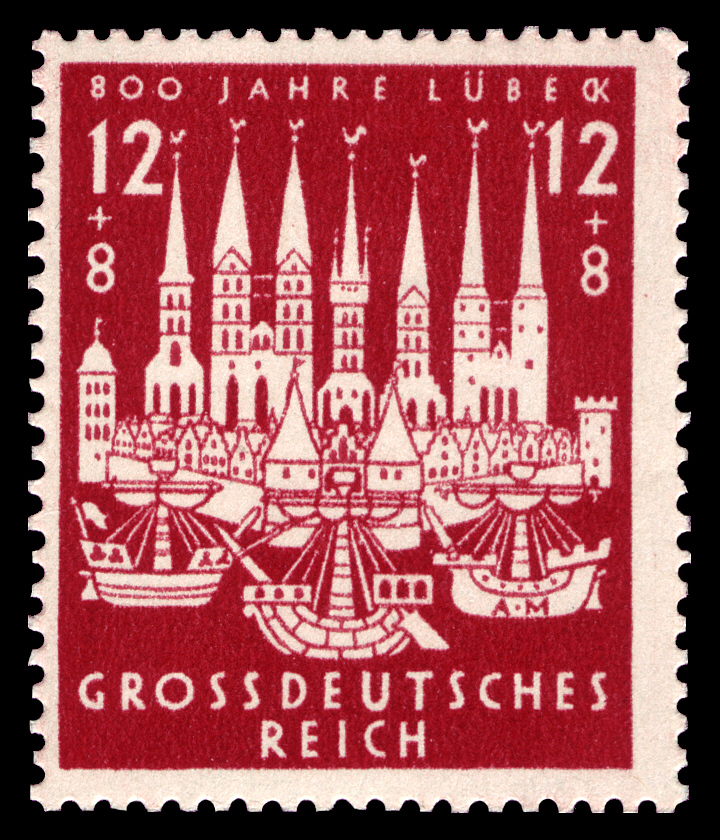
Lübeck
MiNr. 862

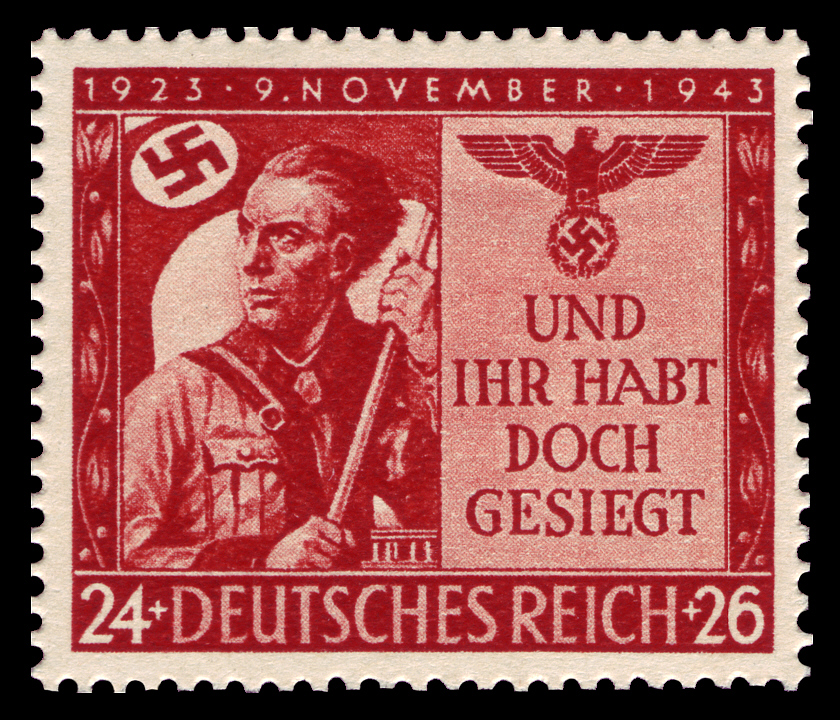
Hitlerputsch
MiNr. 863

=== 1944 ===
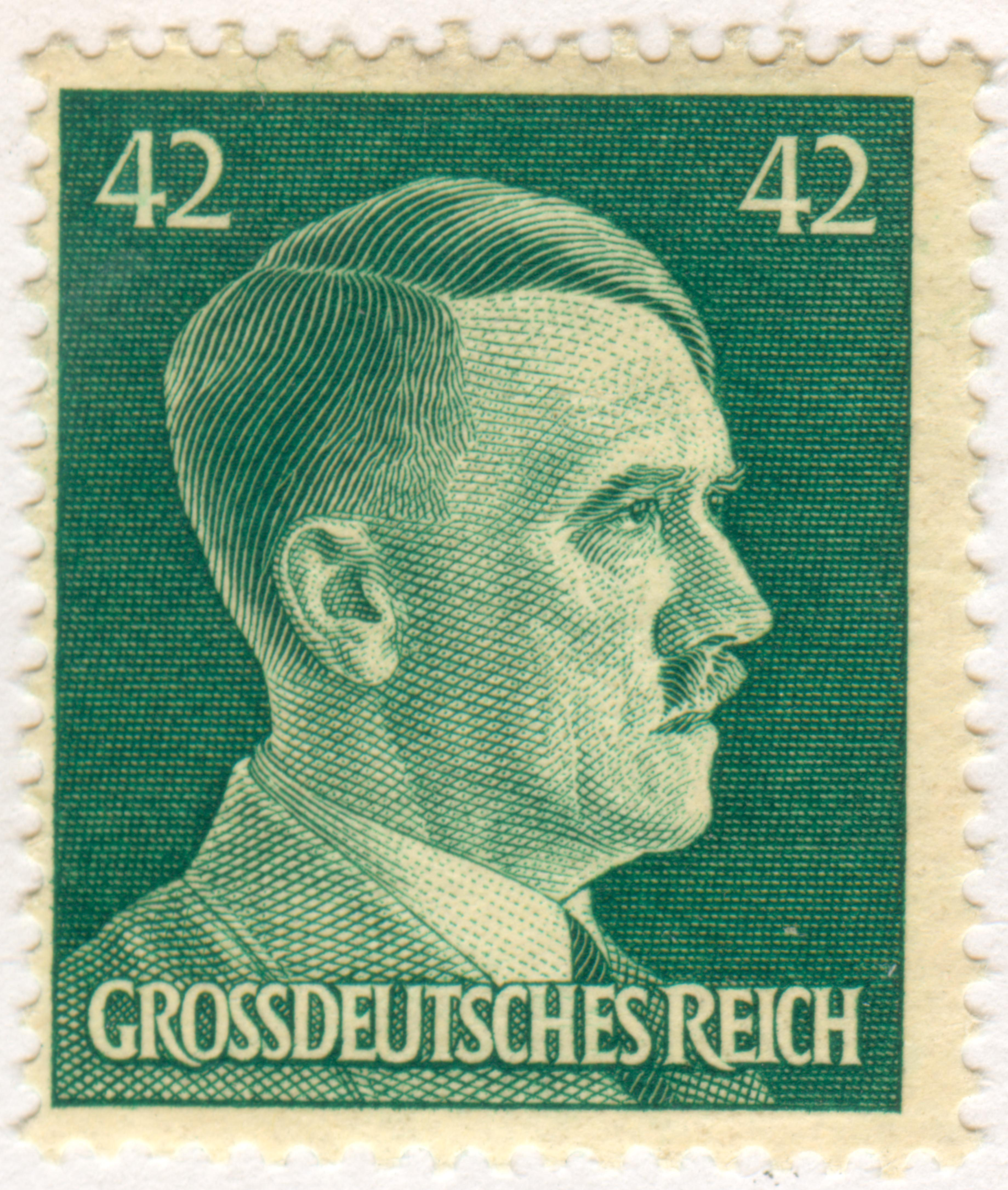
MiNr. A795

== Official stamps ==
=== 1933 ===
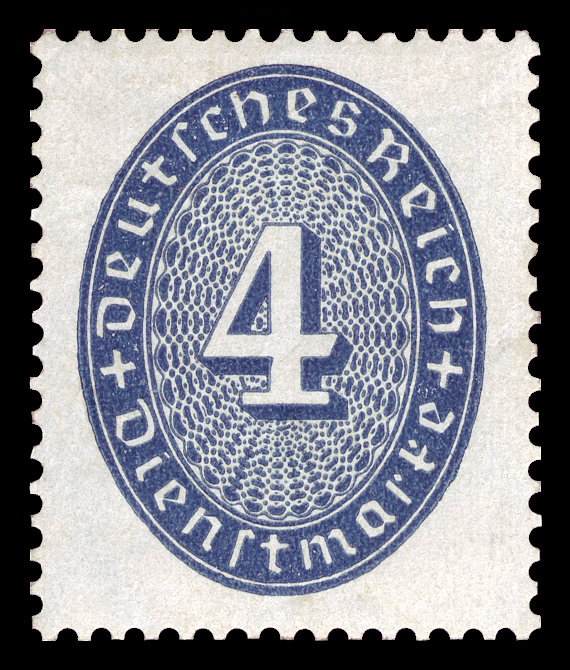
1933, MiNr. 130

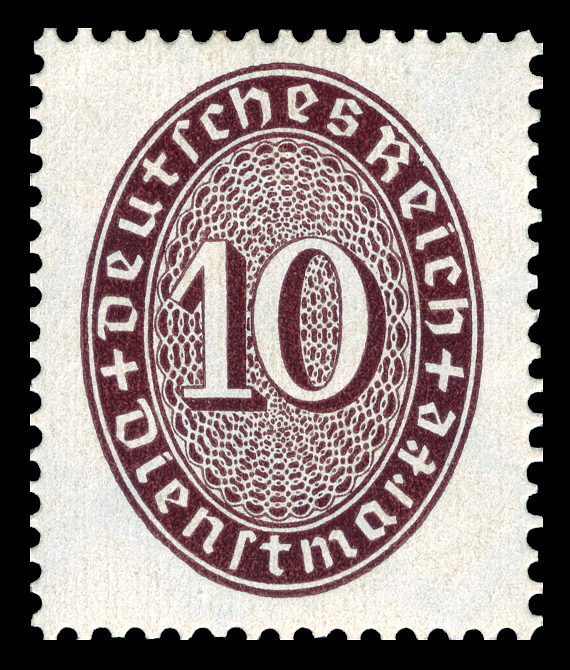
1933, MiNr. 131

=== 1934 ===
complete set

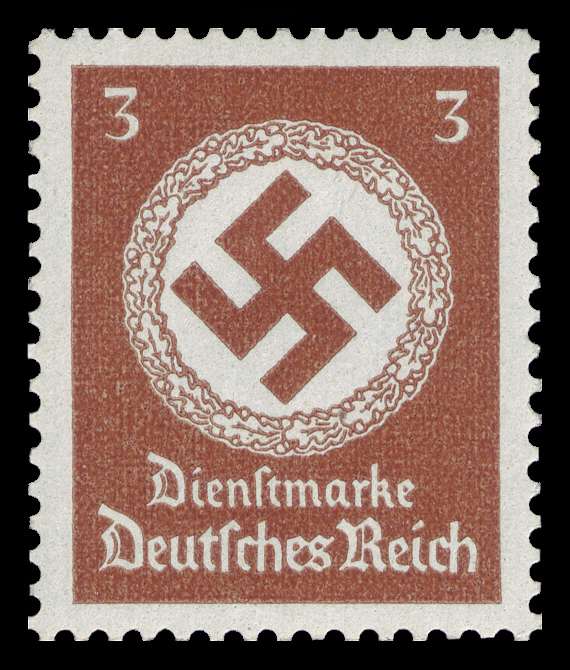
MiNr. 132

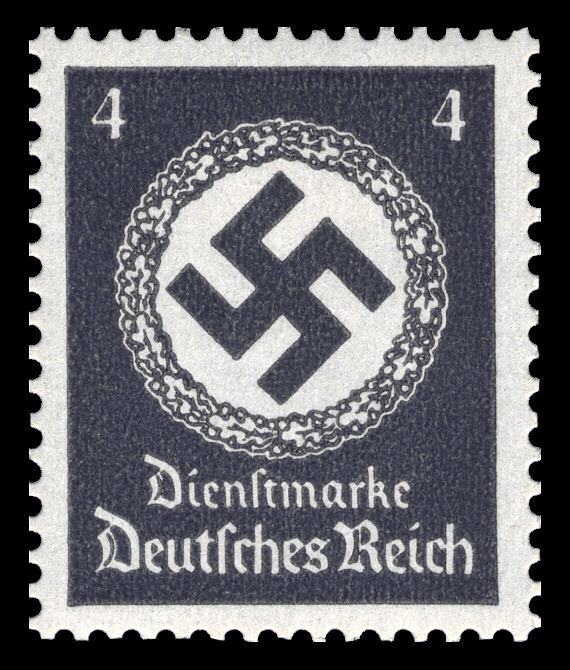
MiNr. 133

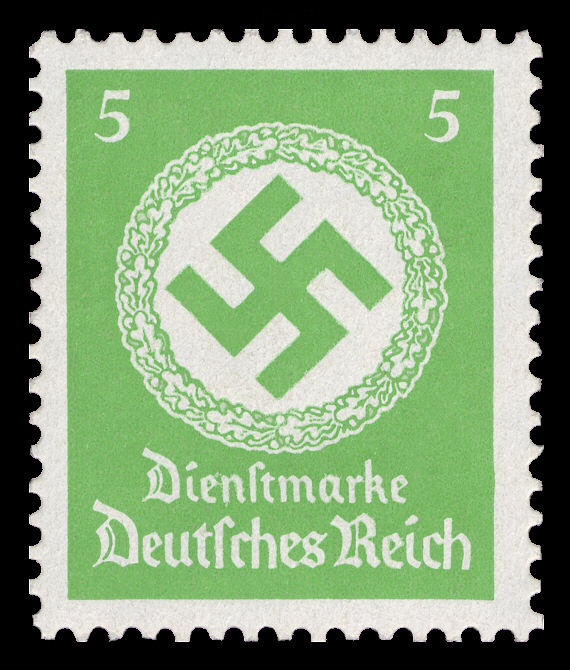
MiNr. 134

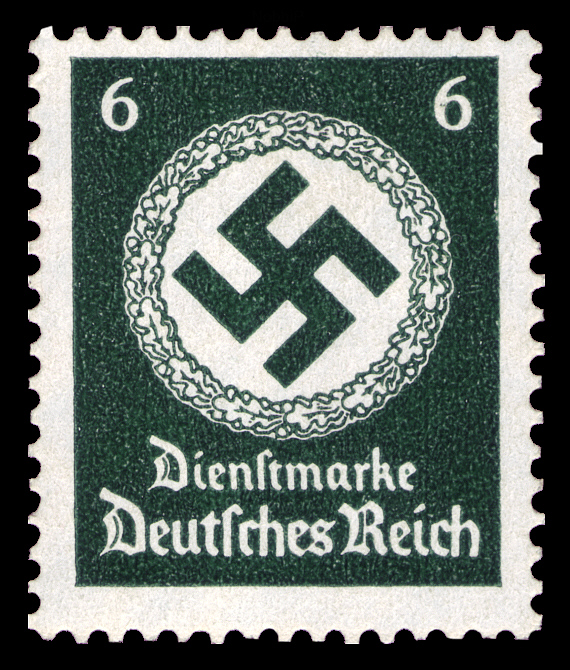
MiNr. 135

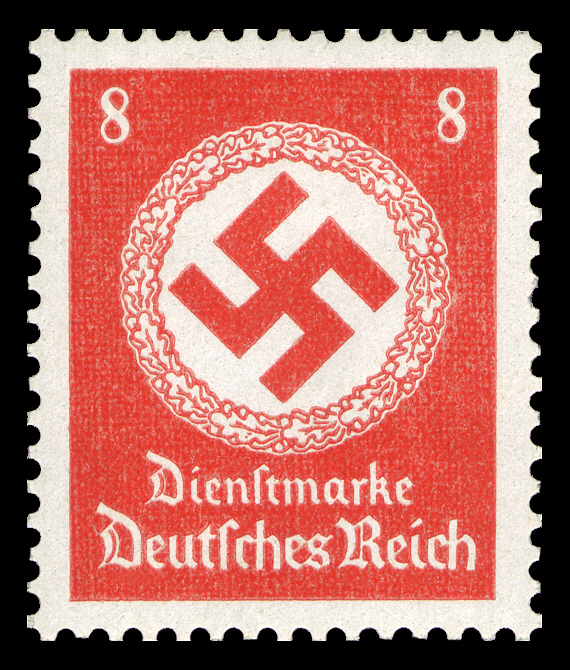
MiNr. 136

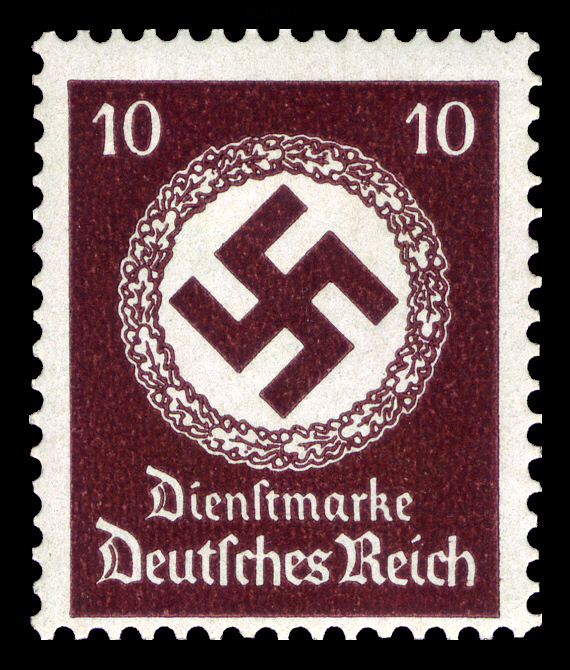
MiNr. 137

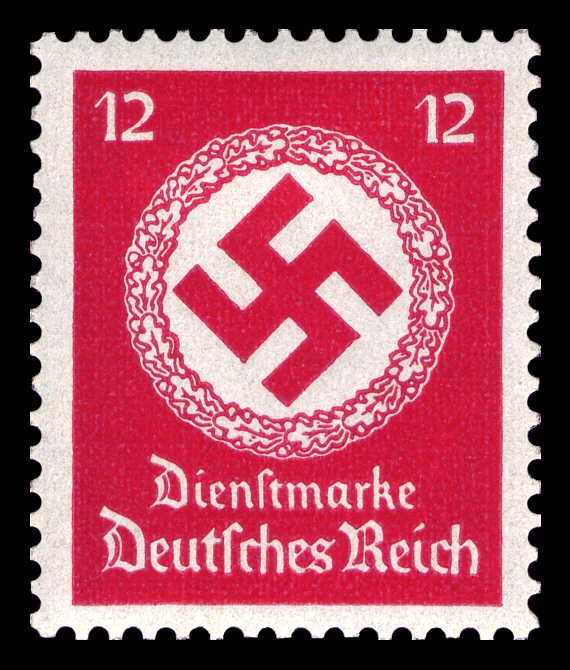
MiNr. 138

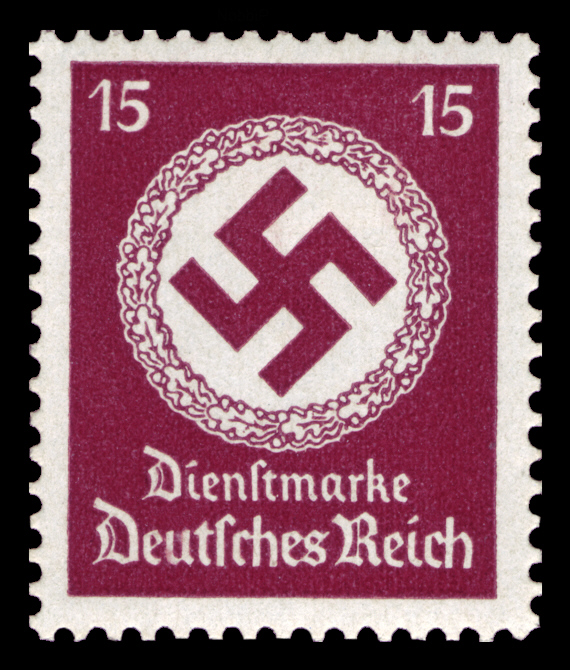
MiNr. 139

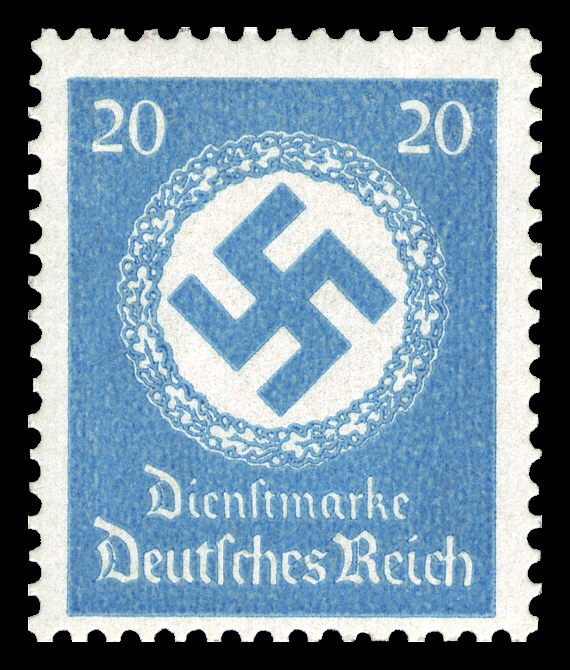
MiNr. 140

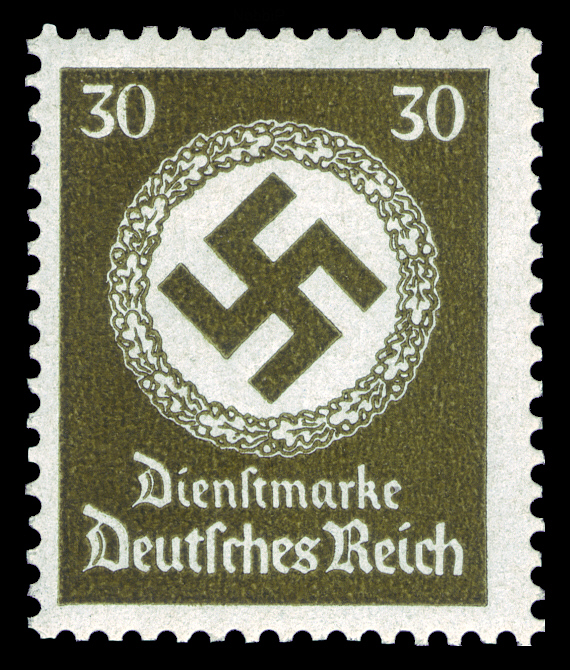
MiNr. 141

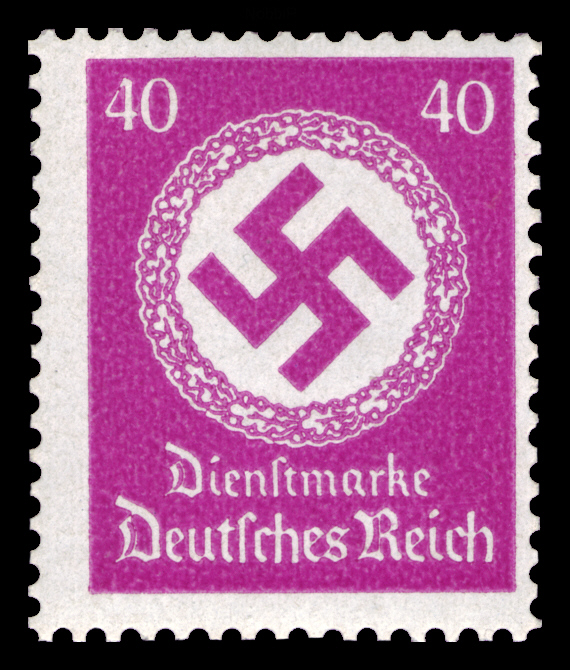
MiNr. 142

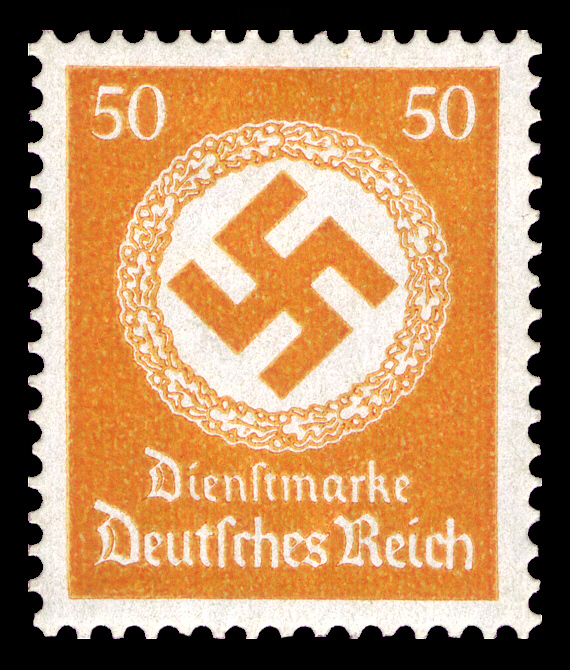
MiNr. 143

=== 1942 ===
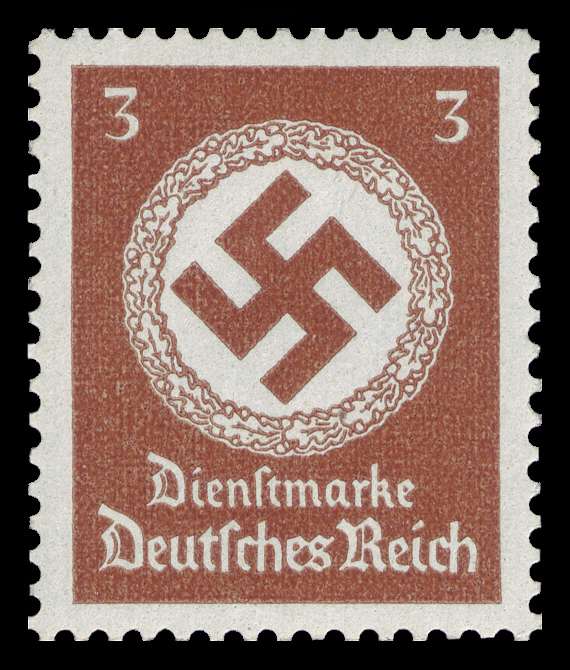
MiNr. 166

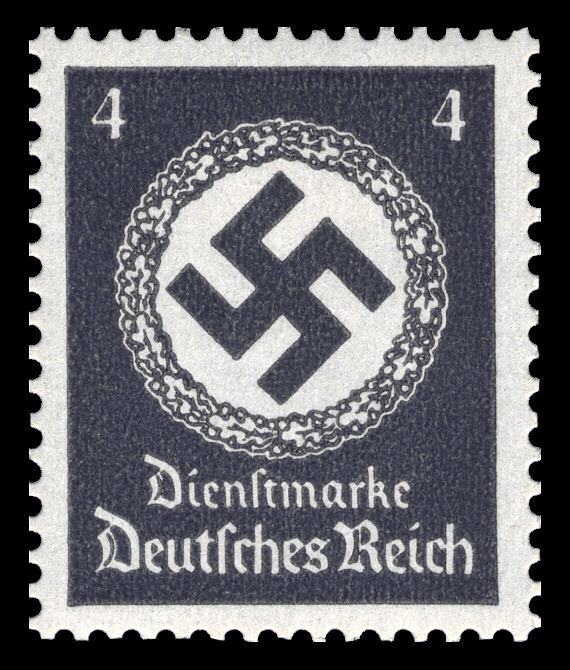
MiNr. 167

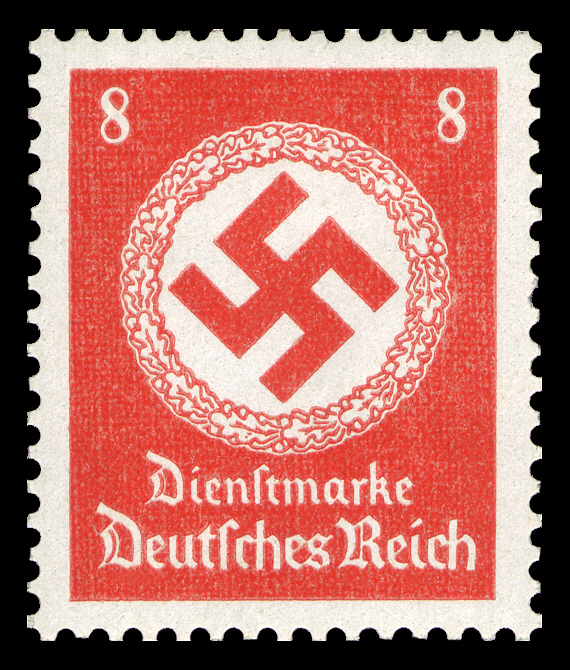
MiNr. 170

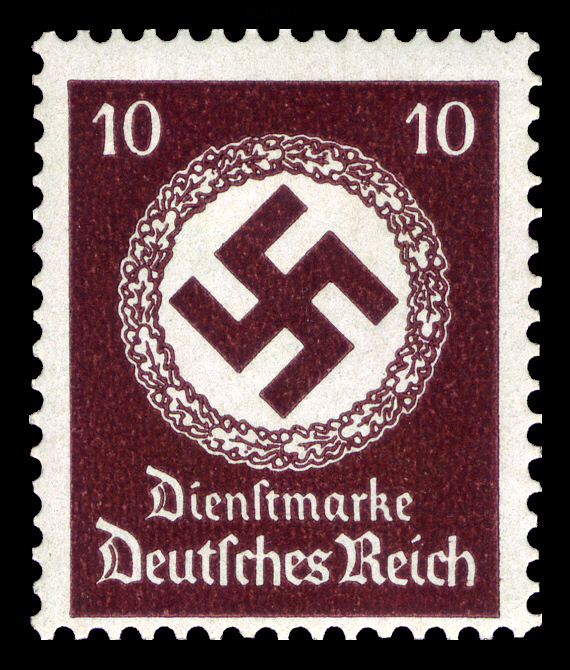
MiNr. 171

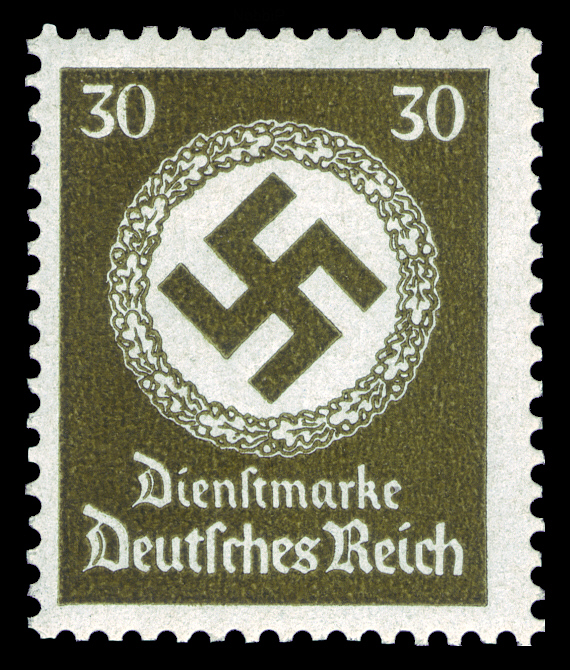
MiNr. 175

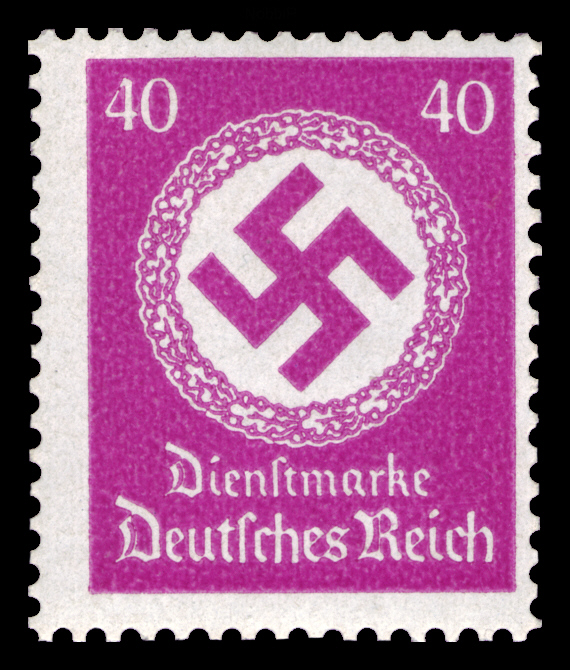
MiNr. 176

=== See also ===
German Postal History and More
