= 50 Reichspfennig (World War II German coin) =

Coin minted by Nazi Germany

- Nazi Germany
- Value: 50 Reichspfennig
- Mass: 1.3 g
- Diameter: 22 mm
- Thickness: 1.55 mm
- Edge: Reeded
- Composition: 100% Al
- Years of minting: 1939-1944

Obverse
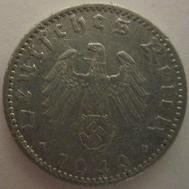
- Design: Reichsadler with swastika. Lettering: Deutsches Reich 1940

Reverse
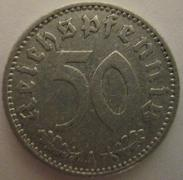
- Design: Denomination and two oak leaves. Mintmark below the denomination and between leaves. Lettering: 50 Reichspfennig A

The 50 Reichspfennig coin was minted by Nazi Germany between 1939 and 1944 during World War II. It is worth 1/2 or .50 of a Reichsmark. Made entirely of aluminium, the 50 Reichspfennig is an emergency issue type, similar to the zinc 1, 5, and 10 Reichspfennig coins from the same period.

== Mint marks ==
Mint mark	Mint location	Notes
A	Berlin, Germany	Capital of Nazi Germany
B	Vienna, Austria (Wien)	Capital of Austria
D	Munich, Germany (München)	
E	Dresden, Germany (Muldenhütten)	
F	Stuttgart, Germany	
G	Karlsruhe, Germany	
J	Hamburg, Germany	

== Mintage ==
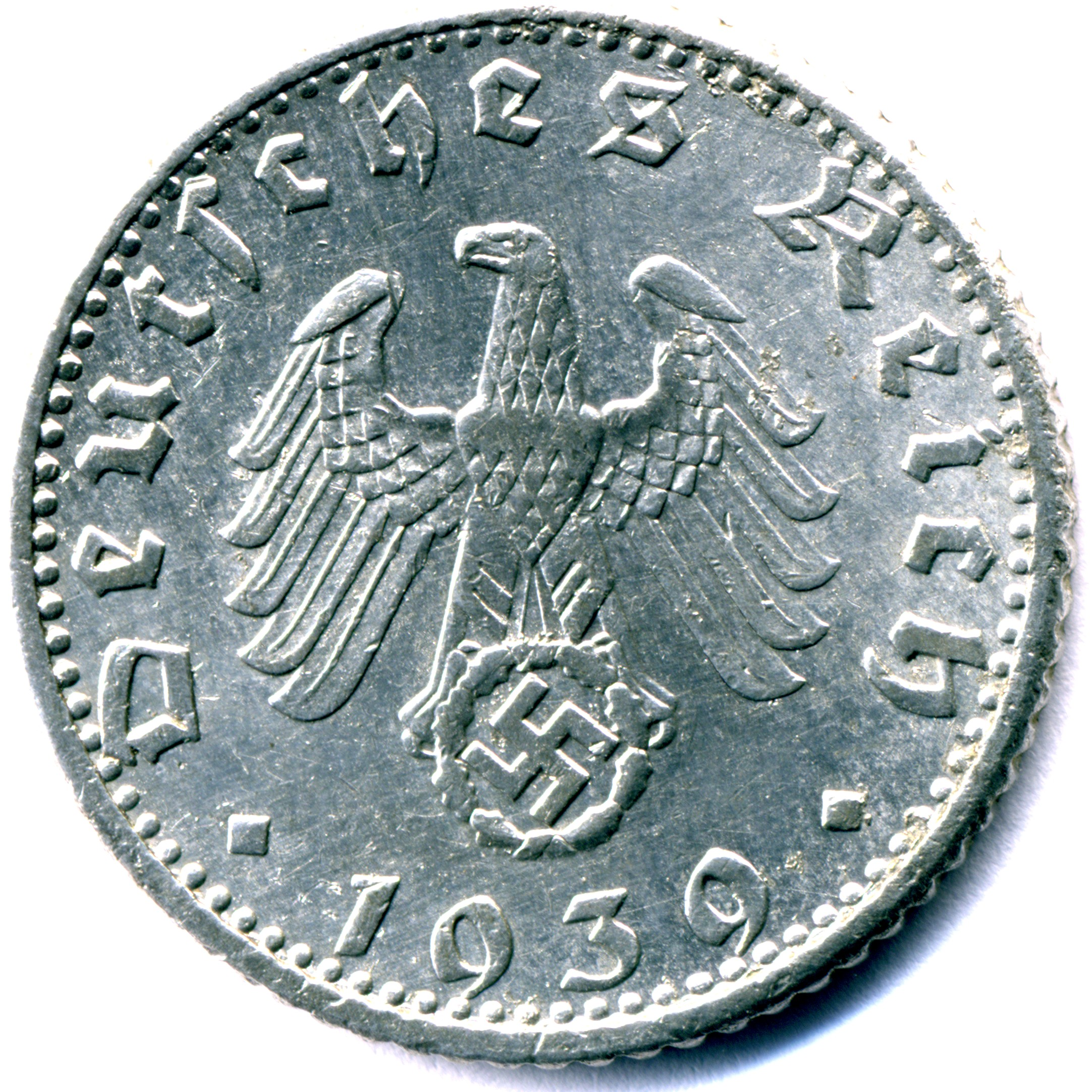
50 Reichspfenning 1939e obverse with date and swastika emblem

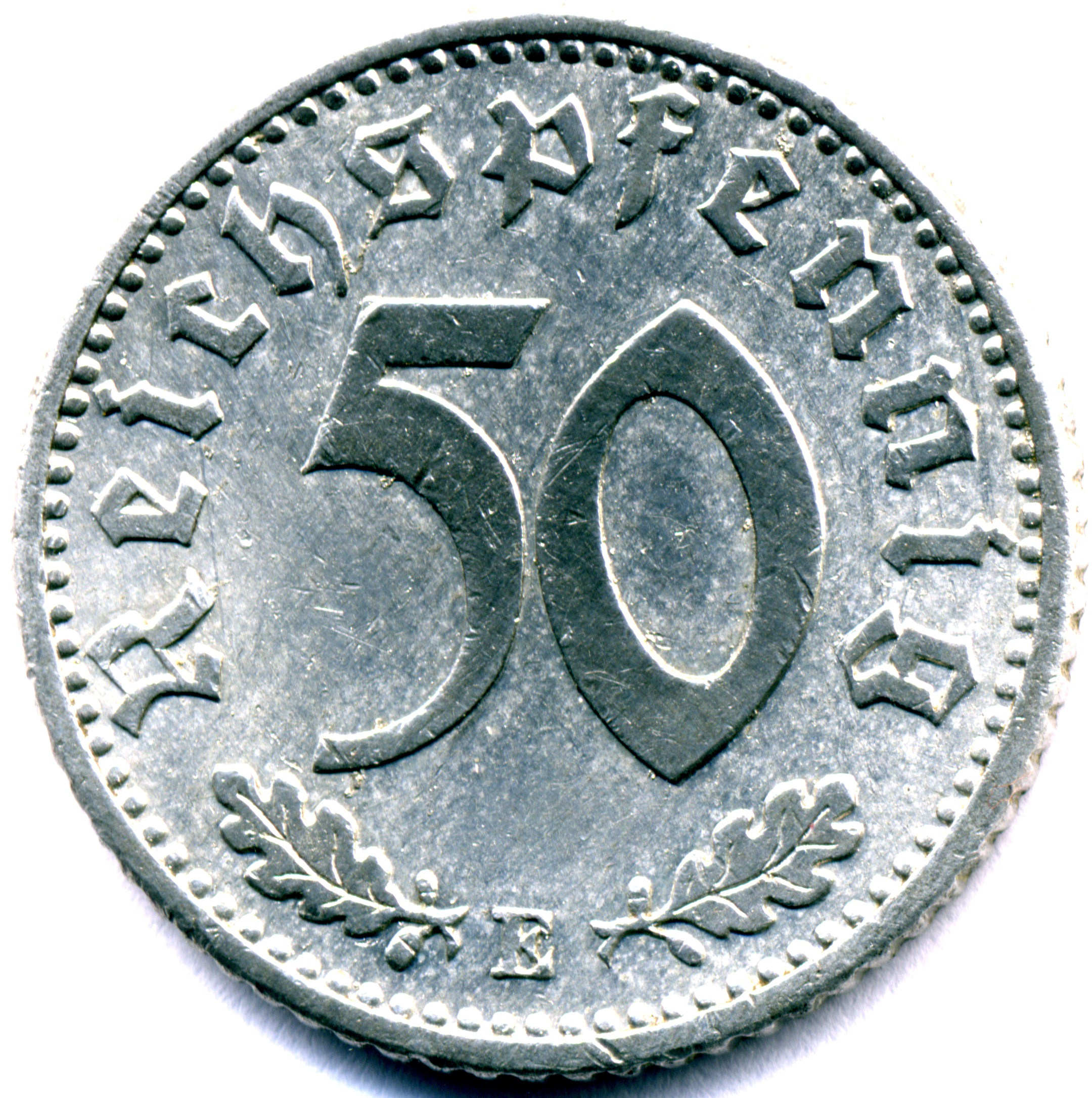
50 Reichspfenning 1939e reverse with denomination and mint mark

1939

Year	Mintage	Notes
1939 A	5,000,000	
1939 B	5,482,000	
1939 D	600,000	
1939 E	2,000,000	
1939 F	3,600,000	
1939 G	560,000	Rare
1939 J	1,000,000	Rare

1940

Year	Mintage	Notes
1940 A	56,128,000	
1940 B	10,016,000	
1940 D	13,800,000	
1940 E	5,618,000	
1940 F	6,663,000	
1940 G	5,616,000	Rare
1940 J	7,335,000	

1941

Year	Mintage	Notes
1941 A	31,263,000	
1941 B	4,291,000	
1941 D	7,200,000	
1941 E	3,806,000	
1941 F	5,128,000	
1941 G	3,091,000	
1941 J	4,165,000	

1942

Year	Mintage	Notes
1942 A	11,580,000	
1942 B	2,876,000	
1942 D	2,247,000	
1942 E	3,810,000	
1942 F	5,133,000	
1942 G	1,400,000	

1943

Year	Mintage	Notes
1943 A	29,325,000	
1943 B	8,229,000	
1943 D	5,315,000	
1943 G	2,892,000	
1943 J	4,166,000	

1944

Year	Mintage	Notes
1944 B	5,622,000	
1944 D	4,886,000	
1944 F	3,739,000	
1944 G	1,190,000	Rare
