= 5 Reichspfennig (World War II German coin) =

Coin minted by Nazi Germany

- Nazi Germany
- Value: 5 Reichspfennig
- Mass: 2.5 g
- Diameter: 18 mm
- Edge: Reeded
- Composition: 100% Zn
- Years of minting: 1940-1944

Obverse
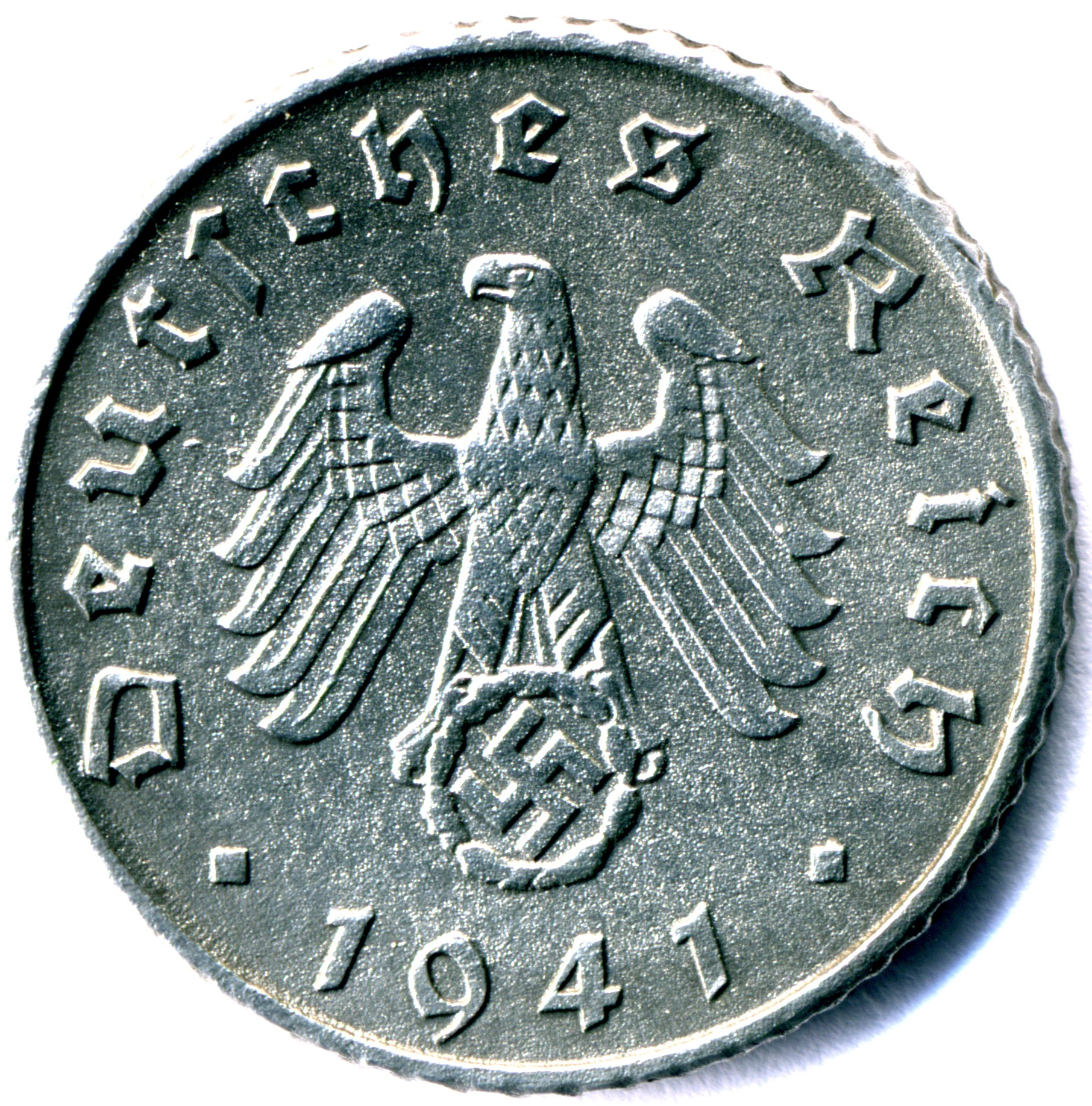
- Design: Reichsadler with swastika. Lettering: Deutsches Reich 1941

Reverse
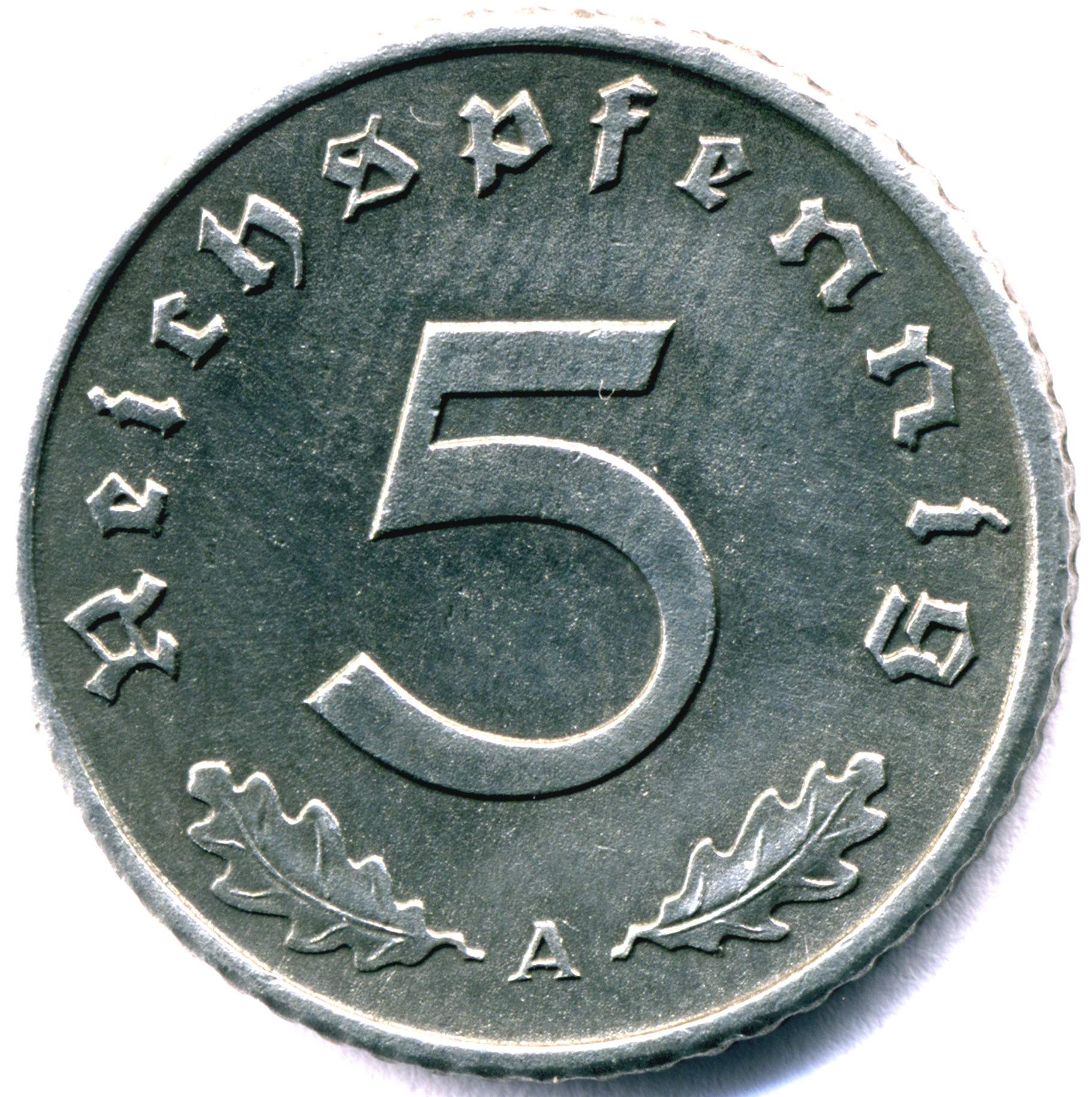
- Design: Denomination and two oak leaves. Mintmark below the denomination and between leaves. Lettering: 5 Reichspfennig A

The zinc 5 Reichspfennig coin was minted by Nazi Germany between 1940 and 1944 during World War II, replacing the bronze-aluminium version, which had a distinct golden color. It was worth 1/20 or .05 of a Reichsmark. Made entirely of zinc, the 5 Reichspfennig is an emergency issue type, similar to the zinc 1 and 10 Reichspfennig, and the aluminium 50 Reichspfennig coins from the same period.

== Mint marks ==
Mint mark	Mint location	Notes
A	Berlin, Germany	Capital of Nazi Germany
B	Vienna, Austria (Wien)	Capital of Austria
D	Munich, Germany (München)	
E	Dresden, Germany (Muldenhütten)	
F	Stuttgart, Germany	
G	Karlsruhe, Germany	
J	Hamburg, Germany	

== Mintage ==
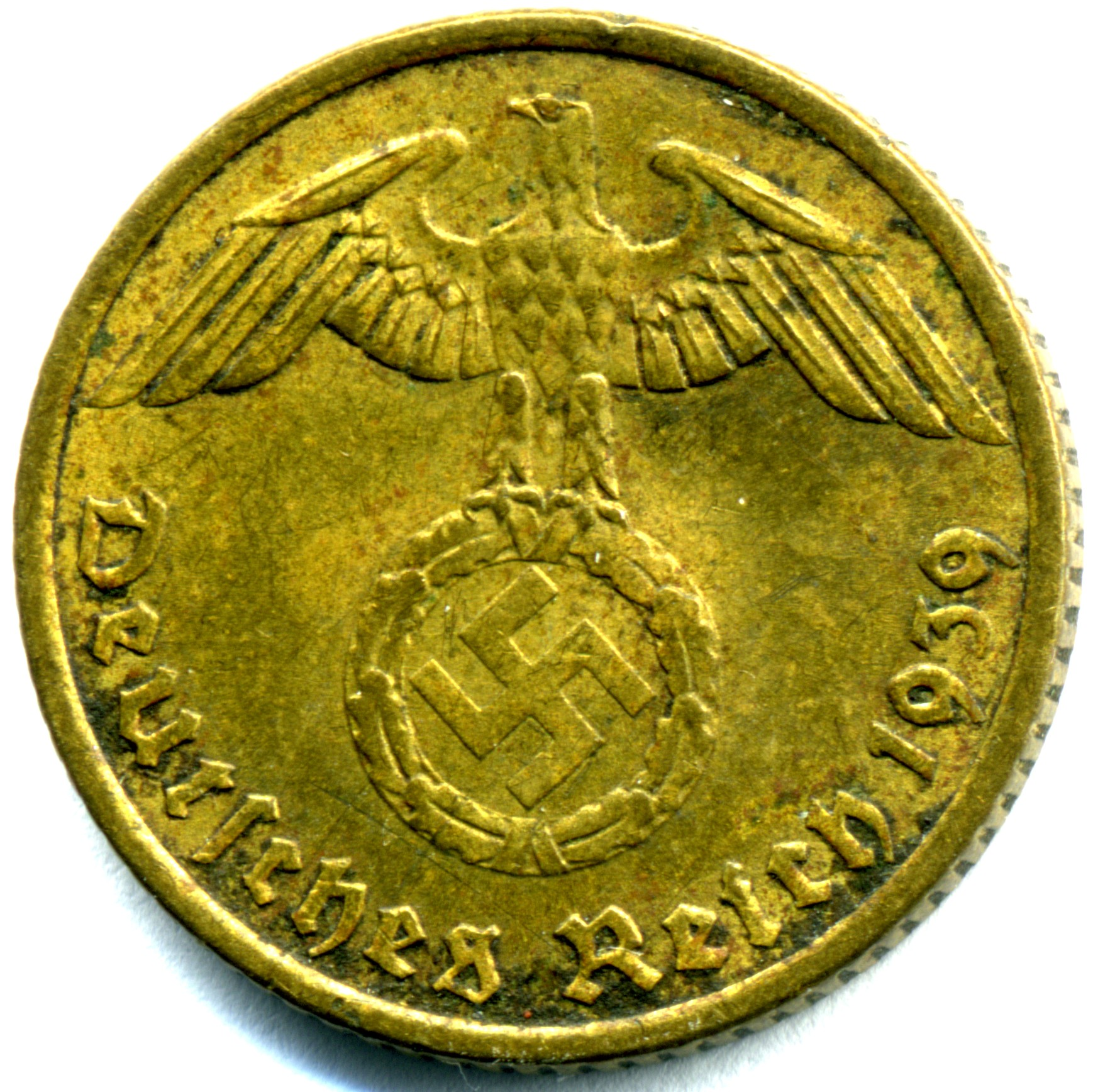
1939a (prewar) for comparison, note the larger eagle and swastika

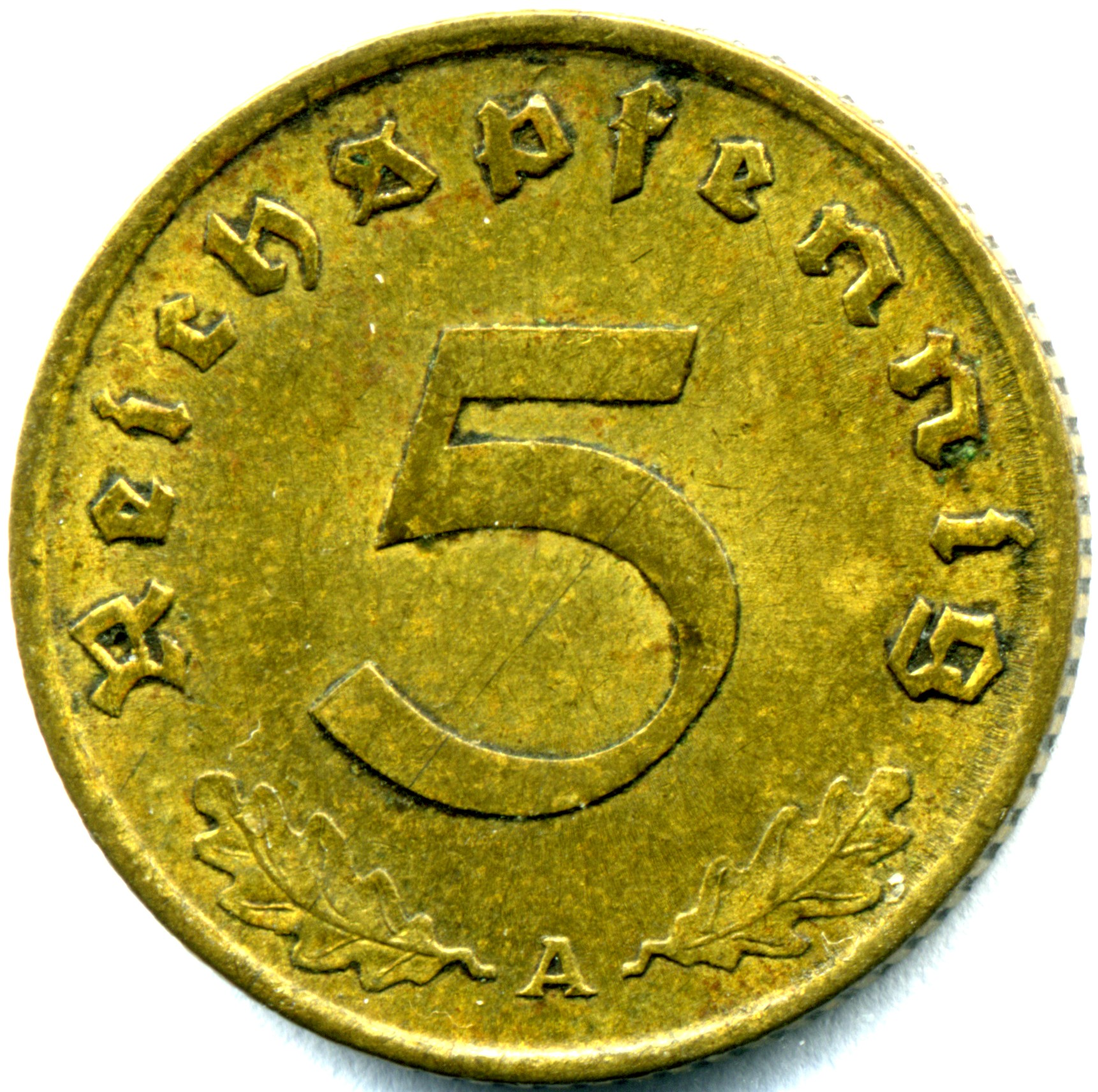
prewar version for comparison

1940

Year	Mintage	Notes
1940 A	174,684,000	
1940 B	63,469,000	
1940 D	44,364,000	
1940 E	25,800,000	
1940 F	31,381,000	
1940 G	24,148,000	
1940 J	30,518,000	

1941

Year	Mintage	Notes
1941 A	246,216,000	
1941 B	60,297,000	
1941 D	51,100,000	
1941 E	26,354,000	
1941 F	36,725,000	
1941 G	21,276,000	
1941 J	52,872,000	

1942

Year	Mintage	Notes
1942 A	161,042,000	
1942 B	12,405,000	
1942 D	15,486,000	
1942 E	8,800,000	Rare
1942 F	24,662,000	
1942 G	12,749,000	

1943

Year	Mintage	Notes
1943 A	46,830,000	
1943 B	833,000	Rare
1943 D	13,650,000	
1943 E	16,581,000	
1943 F	9,891,000	
1943 G	7,237,000	

1944

Year	Mintage	Notes
1944 A	23,699,000	
1944 D	26,340,000	
1944 E	19,720,000	
1944 F	6,853,000	
1944 G	3,540,000	Rare
