= 1 Reichspfennig (World War II German coin) =

Coin minted by Nazi Germany

Ein Reichspfennig
- Nazi Germany
- Value: 0.01 Reichsmark
- Mass: 1.81 g
- Diameter: 17 mm
- Thickness: 1.25 mm
- Edge: Plain
- Composition: 100% Zn
- Years of minting: 1940-1945

Obverse
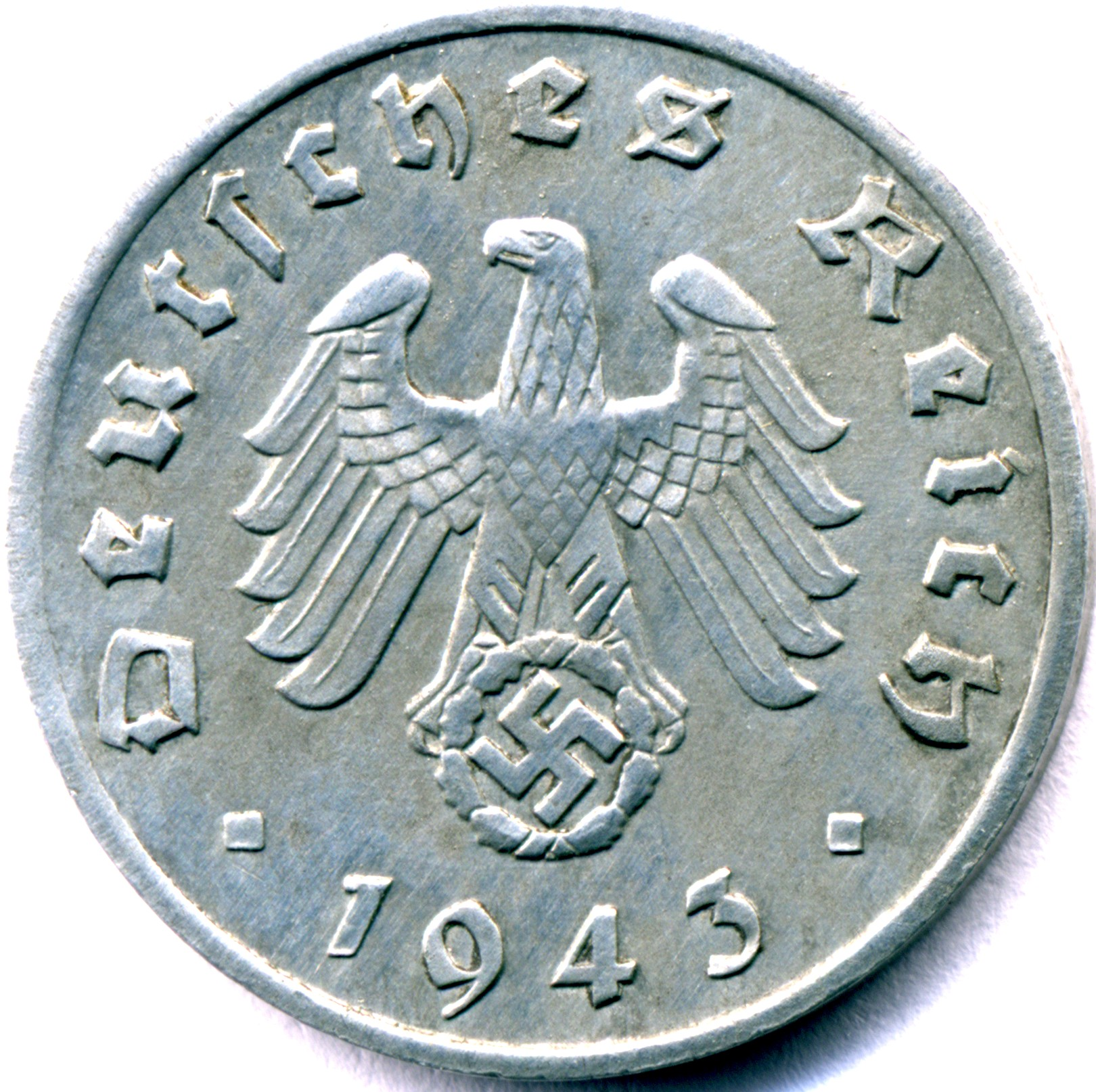
- Design: Reichsadler with swastika. Lettering: Deutsches Reich 1943

Reverse
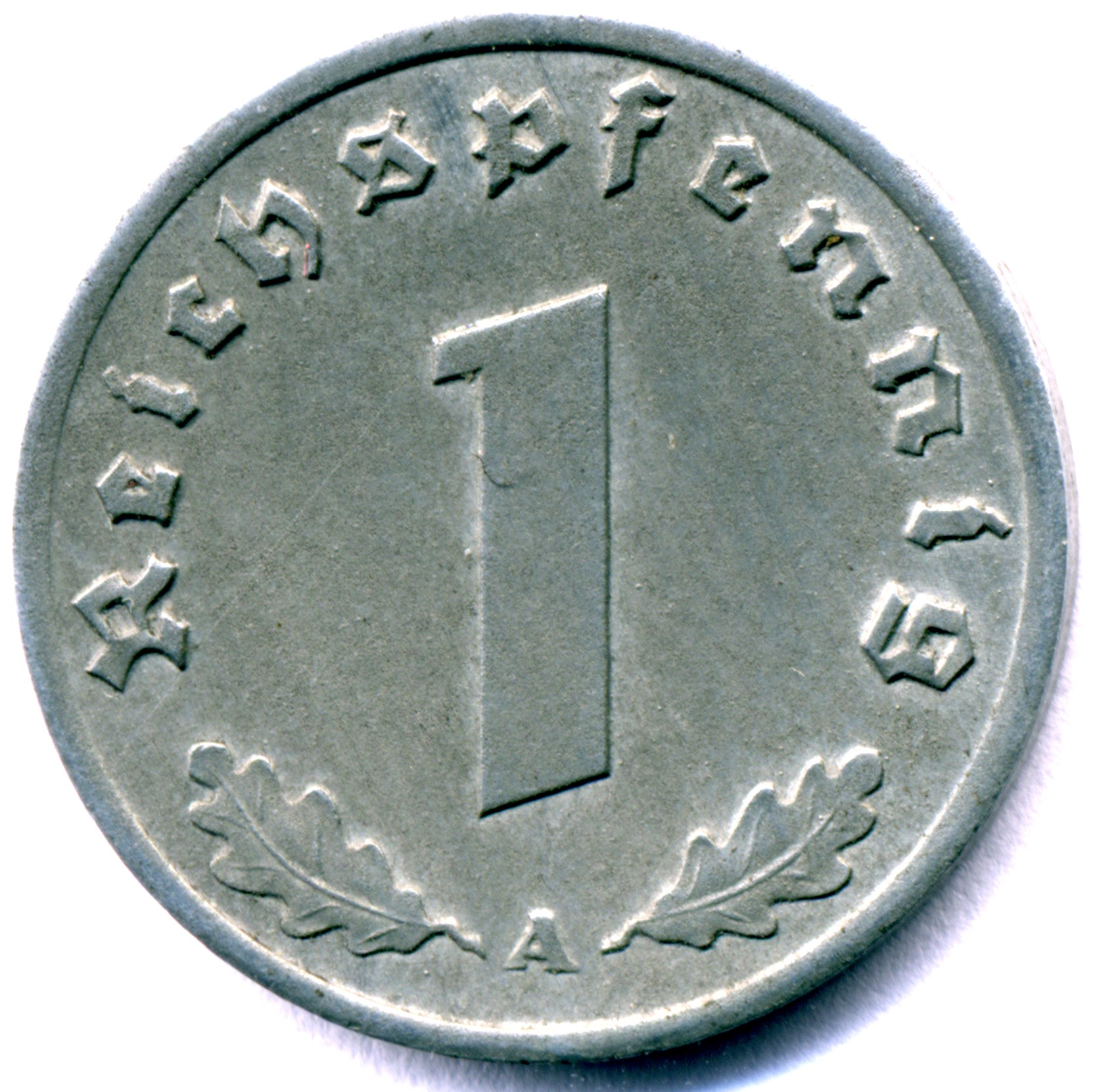
- Design: Denomination and two oak leaves. Mintmark below the denomination and between leaves. Lettering: 1 Reichspfennig A

The zinc 1 Reichspfennig coin was minted by Nazi Germany between 1940 and 1945 during World War II, replacing the bronze version. It was worth 1/100 Reichsmark. Made entirely of zinc, the 1 Reichspfennig is an emergency issue type, similar to the zinc 5 and 10 Reichspfennig, and the aluminium 50 Reichspfennig coins from the same period.

== Mint marks ==
Mint mark	Mint location	Notes
A	Berlin, Germany	Capital of Nazi Germany
B	Vienna, Austria (Wien)	Capital of Austria
D	Munich, Germany (Munchen)	
E	Dresden, Germany (Muldenhutten)	
F	Stuttgart, Germany	
G	Karlsruhe, Germany	
J	Hamburg, Germany	

== Mintage ==
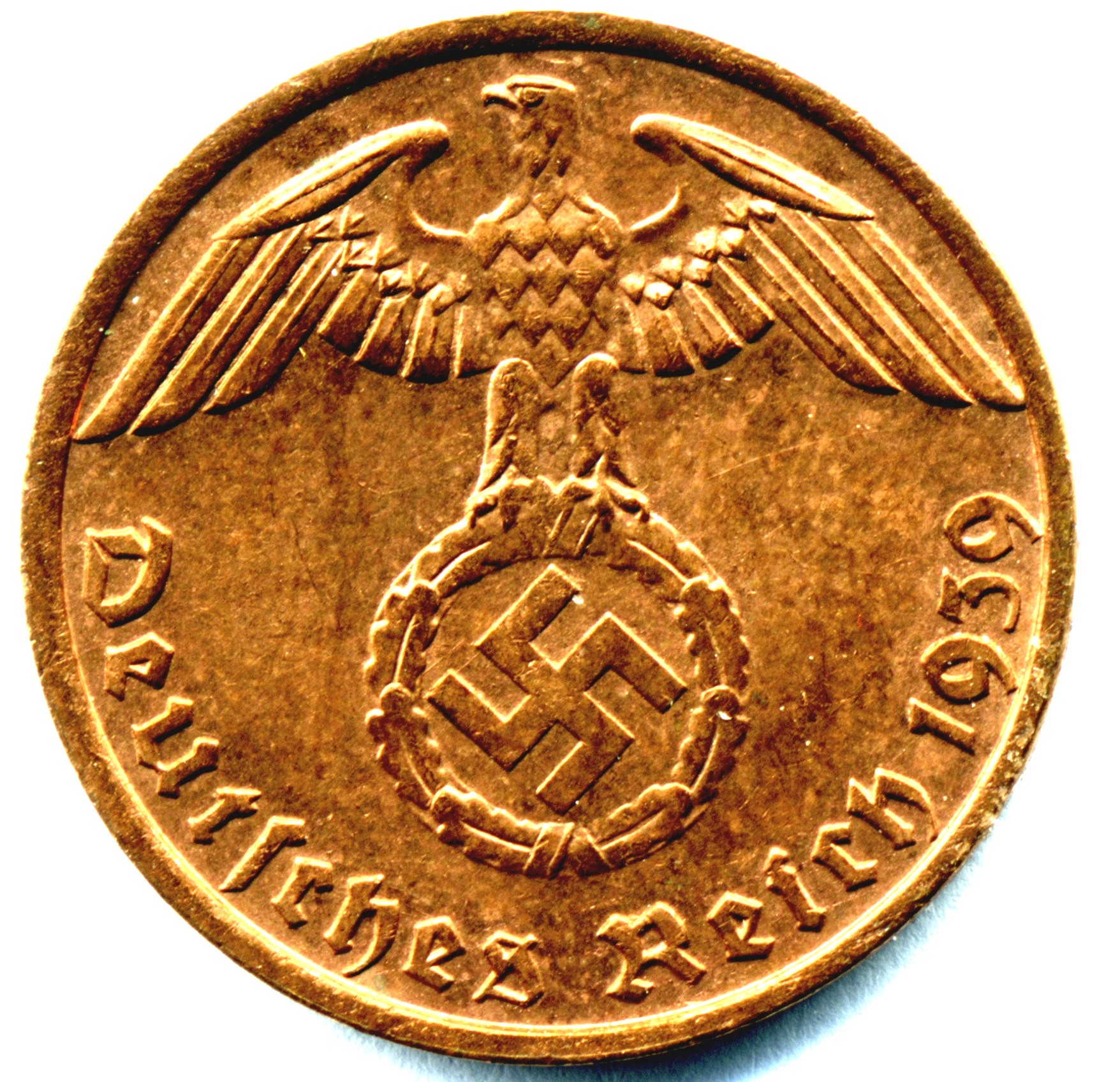
Prewar 1939b bronze version for comparison, note less aggressive eagle and larger swastika

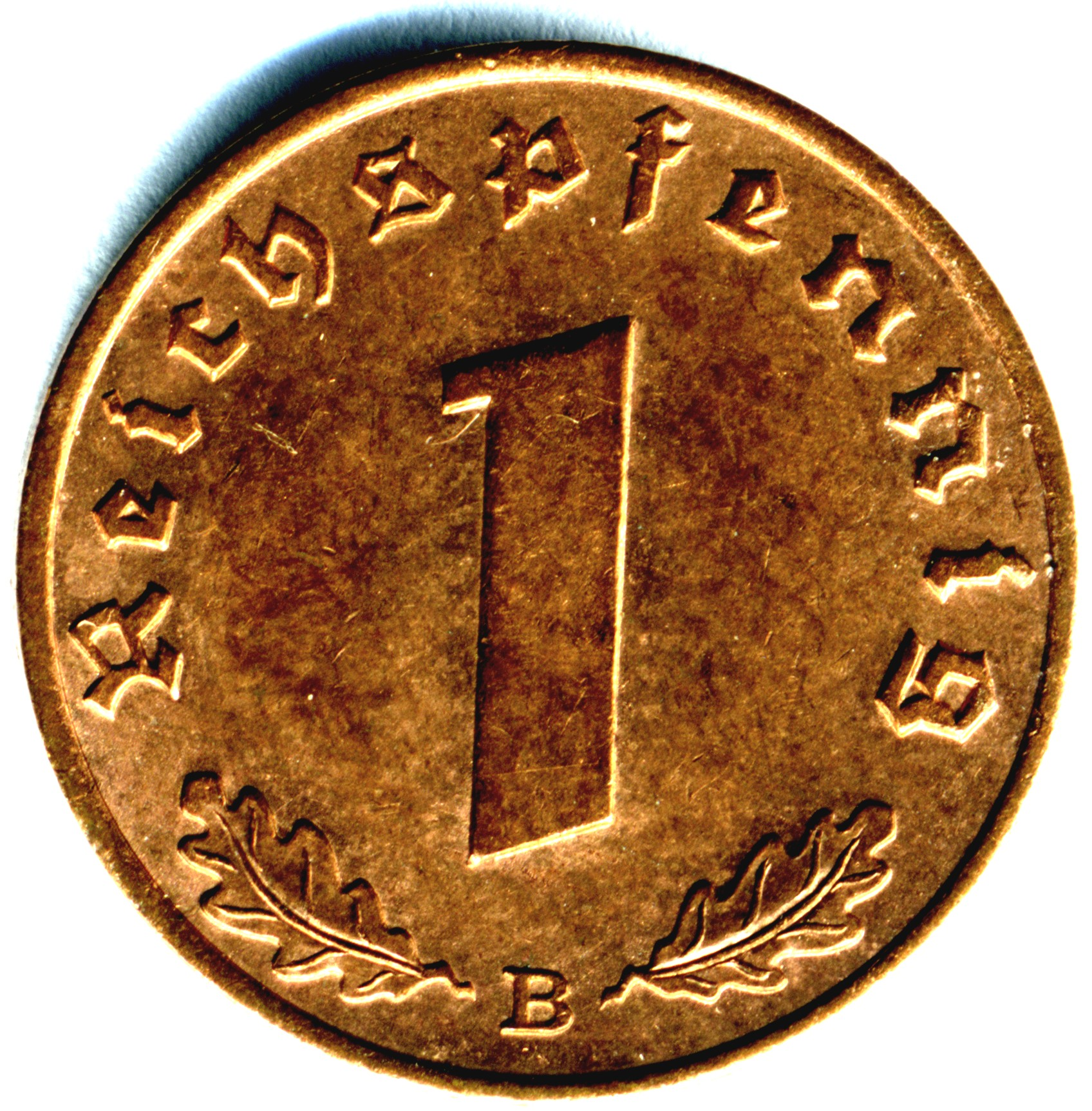
Prewar 1939b bronze version of same value for comparison

1940

Year	Mintage	Notes
1940 A	223,948,000	
1940 B	62,198,000	
1940 D	43,951,000	
1940 E	20,749,000	
1940 F	33,854,000	
1940 G	20,165,000	
1940 J	24,459,000	

1941

Year	Mintage	Notes
1941 A	281,618,000	
1941 B	62,285,000	
1941 D	73,745,000	
1941 E	49,041,000	
1941 F	51,017,000	
1941 G	44,810,000	
1941 J	57,625,000	

1942

Year	Mintage	Notes
1942 A	558,877,000	
1942 B	124,740,000	
1942 D	134,145,000	
1942 E	84,674,000	
1942 F	90,788,000	
1942 G	59,858,000	
1942 J	122,934,000	

1943

Year	Mintage	Notes
1943 A	372,401,000	
1943 B	79,315,000	
1943 D	91,629,000	
1943 E	34,191,000	
1943 F	70,269,000	
1943 G	24,688,000	
1943 J	37,695,000	

1944

Year	Mintage	Notes
1944 A	124,421,000	
1944 B	87,850,000	
1944 D	56,755,000	
1944 E	41,729,000	
1944 F	15,580,000	
1944 G	34,967,000	

1945

Year	Mintage	Notes
1945 A	17,145,000	Rare
1945 E	6,800,000	Rare
